= Michiana =

Geographic region in Indiana and Michigan, United States

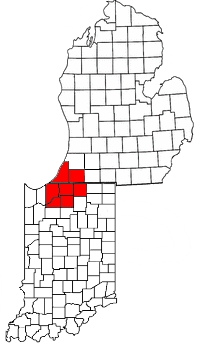
- Michiana as defined by the Chamber of Commerce of St. Joseph County
- States: Indiana; Michigan
- Named for: Michigan and Indiana
- Largest City: South Bend
- Second Largest City: Elkhart
- Counties: 7 (15 including Greater Michiana)

Population (2020)
  - Total: 867,747
  - Estimate (2025): 867,074 ▼
- Time zone: Eastern, Central
  - Summer (DST): Eastern, Central
- Area codes: 219, 269, 574
- Interstates: link = Indiana Toll Road link = Interstate 80 in Indiana link = Interstate 90 in Indiana link = Interstate 94 in Indiana link = Business routes of Interstate 94 in Michigan/Benton_Harbor-St._Joseph link = Interstate 196
- U.S. Highways: link = U.S. Route 6 in Indiana link = U.S. Route 12 link = U.S. Route 20 in Indiana link = U.S. Route 30 in Indiana link = U.S. Route 31 link = U.S. Route 35 in Indiana

Michiana (/ˌmɪʃiˈænə/ MISH-ee-AN-ə) is a region in northern Indiana and southwestern Michigan centered on the city of South Bend, Indiana. The Chamber of Commerce of St. Joseph County, Indiana defines Michiana as St. Joseph County and "counties that contribute at least 500 inbound commuting workers to St. Joseph County daily." Those counties include Elkhart, La Porte, Marshall, St. Joseph, and Starke in Indiana, and Berrien and Cass in Michigan. As of the 2020 census, those seven counties had a population of 867,747 (661,842 in Indiana and 205,905 in Michigan).

The name is a portmanteau of "Michigan" and "Indiana" and was chosen as the winning entry, purportedly submitted by Indiana politician Thurman C. Crook, among others, in a contest to name the area held by the Associated South Bend Merchants in 1934. The term is frequently used throughout the area, particularly by local radio and television stations based in South Bend-Mishawaka that serve the entire area, but also by businesses that seek to draw customers from Indiana into Michigan or vice versa. A 2016 report stated that residents in the Michigan portion are particularly fond of the term because it contains part of the state name as opposed to generic terms for the area such as "the South Bend region."

== Government ==
The Michiana Area Council of Governments (MACOG) is the official Metropolitan Planning Organization for north central Indiana and the South Bend-Mishawaka metropolitan area. MACOG conducts planning for transportation, water quality, and economic development. Currently, 22 cities and towns as well as 29 townships participate in MACOG. Despite the Michiana name, none of these participants are currently from the state of Michigan, although Berrien and Cass Counties were until they along with Van Buren County were combined into their own MPO, what is now called the Southwest Michigan Planning Commission.

== Counties ==
2020 rank	County	State	Seat	2020 Census	2010 Census	Change	Estimated Population	Highest Population (Year)
1	St. Joseph	Indiana	South Bend	272,912	266,931	+2.24%	272,861 ▼ (2025)	262,912 (2020)
2	Elkhart	Indiana	Goshen	207,047	197,559	+4.80%	208,774 ▲ (2025)	207,047 (2020)
3	Berrien	Michigan	St. Joseph	154,316	156,813	−1.59%	152,444 ▼ (2025)	171,276 (1980)
4	LaPorte	Indiana	LaPorte	112,417	111,467	+0.85%	111,294 ▼ (2025)	112,417 (2020)
5	Cass	Michigan	Cassopolis	51,589	52,293	−1.35%	51,677 ▲ (2025)	52,293 (2010)
6	Marshall	Indiana	Plymouth	46,095	47,051	−2.03%	46,599 ▲ (2025)	47,051 (2010)
7	Starke	Indiana	Knox	23,371	23,363	+0.03%	23,425 ▲ (2025)	23,556 (2000)

== Largest cities ==
2020 rank	City	County	State	2020 Census	2010 Census	Change	Estimated Population	Highest Population (Year)
1	South Bend	St. Joseph	Indiana	103,453	101,168	+2.26%	103,201 ▼ (2025)	132,445 (1960)
2	Elkhart	Elkhart	Indiana	53,923	50,949	+5.84%	54,092 ▲ (2025)	53,923 (2020)
3	Mishawaka	St. Joseph	Indiana	51,063	48,252	+5.83%	51,226 ▲ (2025)	51,063 (2020)
4	Goshen	Elkhart	Indiana	34,517	31,719	+8.82%	34,525 ▲ (2025)	34,517 (2020)
5	Michigan City	LaPorte	Indiana	32,075	31,479	+1.89%	31,338 ▼ (2025)	39,369 (1970)
6	Granger	St. Joseph	Indiana	30,337	30,465	−0.42%	—	30,465 (2010)
7	LaPorte	LaPorte	Indiana	22,471	22,053	+1.90%	22,600 ▲ (2025)	22,471 (2020)
8	Niles	Berrien and Cass	Michigan	11,988	11,600	+3.34%	11,665 ▼ (2025)	13,842 (1960)
9	Plymouth	Marshall	Indiana	10,214	10,033	+1.80%	11,081 ▲ (2025)	10,214 (2020)
10	Benton Harbor	Berrien	Michigan	9,103	10,038	−9.31%	8,803 ▼ (2025)	19,136 (1960)

== Greater Michiana ==
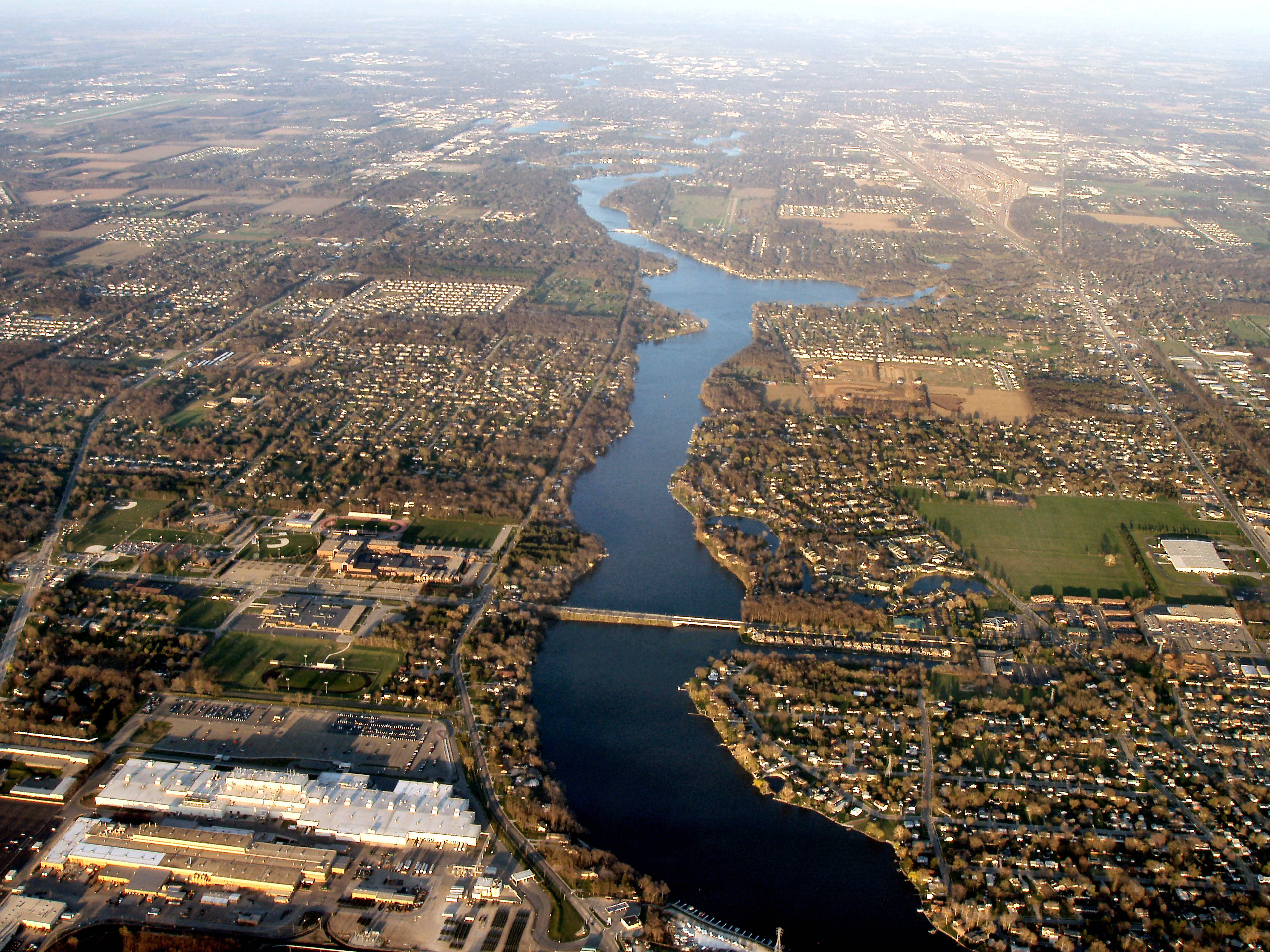
The St. Joseph River flows through the heart of Michiana, southwest from Michigan to Indiana, west through Mishawaka (shown), turning north at South Bend, back into Michigan through Niles to Lake Michigan at St. Joseph.

Greater Michiana includes the following 15 counties in Indiana and Michigan:

- Berrien County, Michigan
- Cass County, Michigan
- St. Joseph County, Michigan
- Van Buren County, Michigan
- Elkhart County, Indiana
- Fulton County, Indiana
- Kosciusko County, Indiana
- LaGrange County, Indiana
- Lake County, Indiana
- La Porte County, Indiana
- Marshall County, Indiana
- Noble County, Indiana
- Porter County, Indiana
- St. Joseph County, Indiana
- Starke County, Indiana

The Chamber of Commerce of St. Joseph County (Indiana) defines Greater Michiana as "counties within a 60-mile [97 km] driving distance to St. Joseph County" that are not included in the seven counties making up Michiana "proper." However, the driving distance presumably refers to the distance between the metropolitan South Bend area and significant population centers in outlying areas, since a strict definition allowing for 60 miles from any point in St. Joseph County would add even more counties to the Greater Michiana area. For example, Walkerton in southwestern St. Joseph County is located approximately 30 miles (48 km) from Monterey in northeastern Pulaski County, yet Pulaski is not included in the Chamber's list of Greater Michiana counties.

Because Michiana is not a legal or political entity, opinions differ about what counties and communities constitute the region. Some definitions of the entire Michiana area include fewer than 15 counties; others include Pulaski County and exclude some other outlying counties, notably, those in extreme Northwest Indiana, whose residents identify more closely with Chicago than with the South Bend area.

Michiana's borders overlap with those of the Chicago metropolitan area, and the two regions have significant cultural ties. South Bend in particular has strong ties to Chicago: it is home to the last stop on the South Shore Line, a commuter rail line connecting Chicago's downtown and south side to Indiana, and the nearby University of Notre Dame is noted for its strong connection with Chicago. Berrien County, Michigan, is known as a common summer vacation destination for wealthy Chicagoans; The Wall Street Journal called the area "the Hamptons of the Midwest".

== Economy ==
Throughout the twentieth century, the economy of Michiana was based on heavy industry, especially as connected to the automobile industry centered in nearby Detroit. In 1960, 41% of the employment was in manufacturing, followed by 17% in hospitality 8% in business services, 6% in transportation, 5% in education, and 5% in agriculture, with healthcare at 4% and government at 2%. Deindustrialization had a major impact after 1970, and by 2013, only 27% of the employment was in manufacturing, 20% was in hospitality, 12% in healthcare, 11% in government, 8% in business services, 5% in transportation, and 4% in education. In 2013, three of the top 10 Michiana employers were in the Elkhart area and focused on recreational vehicles, trailers, and related products, including Forest River with 7600 employees, Thor Industries with 7500, and Drew industries with 4700. Many hospitals were consolidated, as health spending doubled and tripled. By 2013 three health systems were among the top 10 employers: Beacon Health System (7000 employees; based in Elkhart and South Bend); Lakeland Regional Health System (4100 employees; based in St. Joseph and Niles), and Saint Joseph Regional Medical Center (2700; based in Mishawaka and Plymouth). The University of Notre Dame had 5700 employees in the educational sector, and the South Bend Community School Corporation had 3000. Whirlpool Corporation, the appliance maker, with 3400 employees, is based in Benton Harbor. Martin's Super Markets operated 21 grocery stores in the region with 3100 employees. With the loss of manufacturing, per capita income in Michiana has declined from 105% of the national average in 1960 to 82% in 2013.

== Education ==
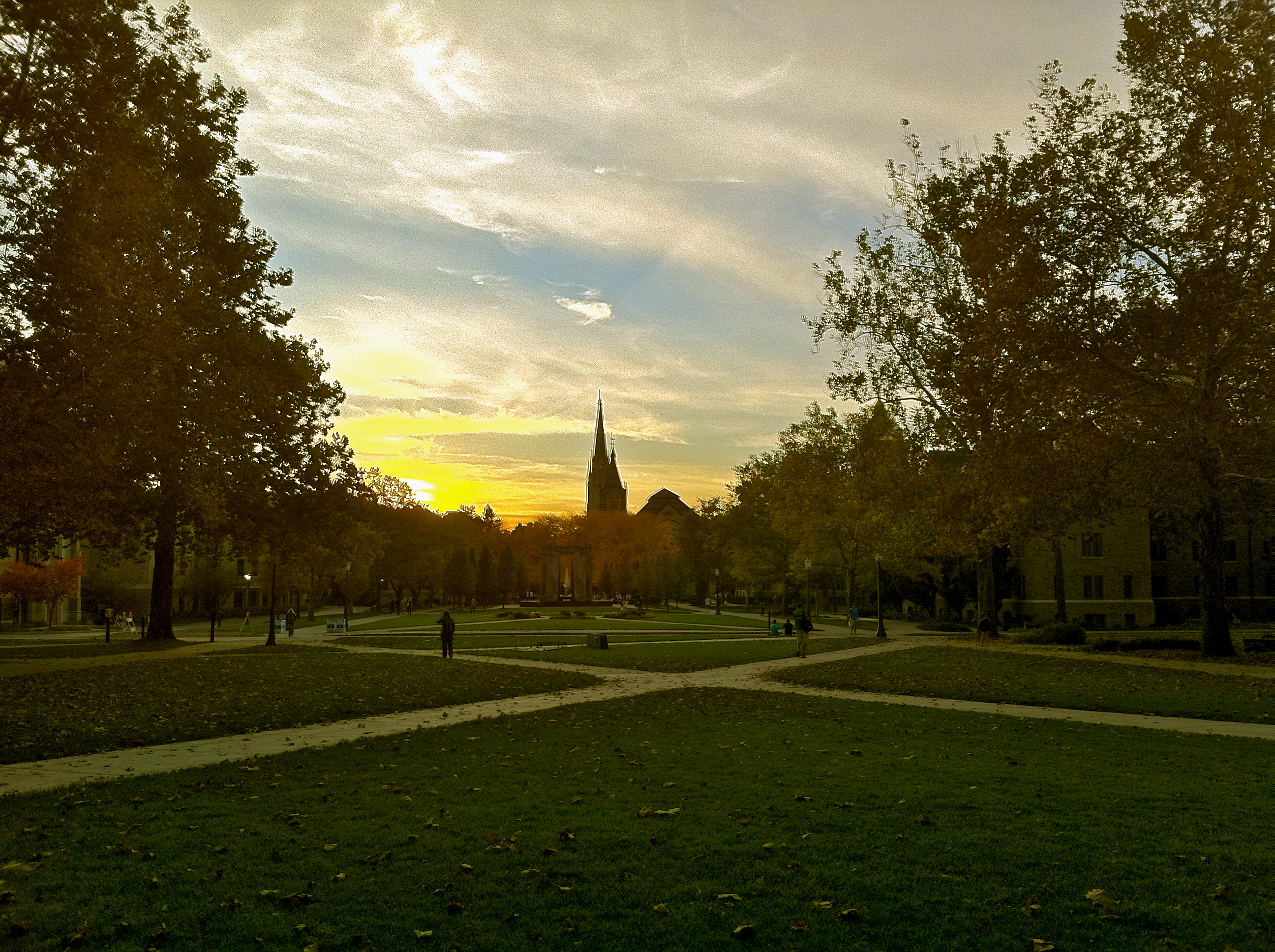
University of Notre Dame's South Quad in October 2011

=== Colleges and universities ===
- Andrews University (Berrien Springs, Michigan)
- Bethel University (Mishawaka, Indiana)
- Goshen College (Goshen, Indiana)
- Holy Cross College, (Notre Dame/South Bend, Indiana)
- Indiana Tech (Mishawaka, Indiana)
- Indiana University School of Medicine - South Bend (South Bend, Indiana)
- Indiana University South Bend (South Bend, Indiana)
- Ivy Tech Community College (multiple locations including; Elkhart, LaPorte, Michigan City, and South Bend, Indiana)
- Lake Michigan College (multiple locations including; Benton Harbor and Niles, Michigan)
- Marian University - Plymouth — formerly Ancilla College (Plymouth, Indiana)
- University of Notre Dame (Notre Dame/South Bend, Indiana)
- Purdue University Northwest (Westville, Indiana)
- Saint Mary's College (Notre Dame/South Bend, Indiana)
- Southwestern Michigan College (multiple locations including Dowagiac and Niles, Michigan)
- Twin City Beauty College (St. Joseph, Michigan)

== Transportation ==
=== Airports ===
==== Commercial use ====
- South Bend International Airport (SBN)

==== Public use ====
Sources:

- Andrews University Airpark
- Dowagiac Municipal Airport
- Elkhart Municipal Airport (EKI)
- Goshen Municipal Airport (GSH)
- Jerry Tyler Memorial Airport
- La Porte Municipal Airport (LPO)
- Michigan City Municipal Airport (MGC)
- Mishawaka Pilots Club Airport
- Nappanee Municipal Airport
- Starke County Airport
- Plymouth Municipal Airport (PLY)
- Southwest Michigan Regional Airport
- Watervliet Municipal Airport

=== Train stations ===
==== South Shore Line ====
- 11th Street/Michigan City Station
- Carroll Avenue Station
- Hudson Lake Station
- South Bend Airport Station (Terminus)

==== Amtrak ====
Sources:

- Dowagiac Station
- Elkhart Station
- New Buffalo Station
- Niles Station
- St. Joseph Station
- South Bend Station

==== Former stations ====
- Ardmore Station, St. Joseph County (South Shore)
- Chain O’Lakes Station, St. Joseph County (South Shore)
- Hillside Station, LaPorte County (South Shore)
- Lake Park Station, LaPorte County (South Shore)
- Lake Shore Station, LaPorte County (South Shore)
- LaLumiere Station (South Shore)
- Liberty Bell Station, LaPorte County (South Shore)
- Lydick Station, St. Joseph County (South Shore)
- Michigan City Station (Amtrak)
- Nappanee Station (Amtrak)
- New Carlisle Station (South Shore)
- Olive Station, St. Joseph County (South Shore)
- Rolling Prairie Station (South Shore)
- Sagunay Station, LaPorte County (South Shore)
- Smith Station, LaPorte County (South Shore)
- South Bend Station (South Shore)
- Springfield Station, LaPorte County (South Shore)
- Tee Lake Station, LaPorte County (South Shore)
- Willard Avenue (South Shore)

== Points of interest ==
For more information and other points of interest not listed below, see the articles on the individual communities in the region.

=== Historical sites ===
- The History Museum (South Bend, Indiana)

=== Museums ===
- Fort St. Joseph Museum (Niles, Michigan)
- LaPorte County Historical Society Museum (LaPorte County, Indiana)
- Old Lighthouse Museum (Michigan City, Indiana)
- Studebaker National Museum (South Bend, Indiana) (R.V. Museum) (Elkhart, IN)
- Mishawaka Historical Museum (Mishawaka, Indiana)

=== Parks ===
- Indiana Dunes National Park
- Kingsbury Fish and Wildlife Area (Indiana)
- Potato Creek State Park (Indiana)
- Warren Dunes State Park (Michigan)
- Warren Woods State Park (Michigan)

== See also ==
- Northern Indiana
- Southern Michigan
- West Michigan
- Kentuckiana
