= Dune Acres station =

Dune Acres

General information
- Location: Mineral Springs Road; Porter County, Indiana
- Coordinates: 41°38′12″N 87°5′12″W
- Owner: NICTD
- Platforms: 1 side platform
- Tracks: 1

Other information
- Fare zone: 6

History
- Closed: 1994
- Former names: Mineral Springs Road

Former services
Preceding station	NICTD	Following station
Miller toward Randolph Street	South Shore Line	Dune Park toward South Bend Airport
Location

Dune Acres was a South Shore Line flag stop located at Mineral Springs Road serving Dune Acres in Porter County, Indiana. The station opened prior to 1910, and it was originally known as Mineral Springs Road. The station closed in 1994, as part of an NICTD service revision which also saw the closure of Ambridge. Kemil Road, Willard Avenue, LaLumiere, Rolling Prairie, and New Carlisle. The station did not close on July 5, 1994, like the other stations, instead closing after parking was expanded at the Dune Park station.
