= Dune Acres, Indiana =

- Town
- Town of Dune Acres
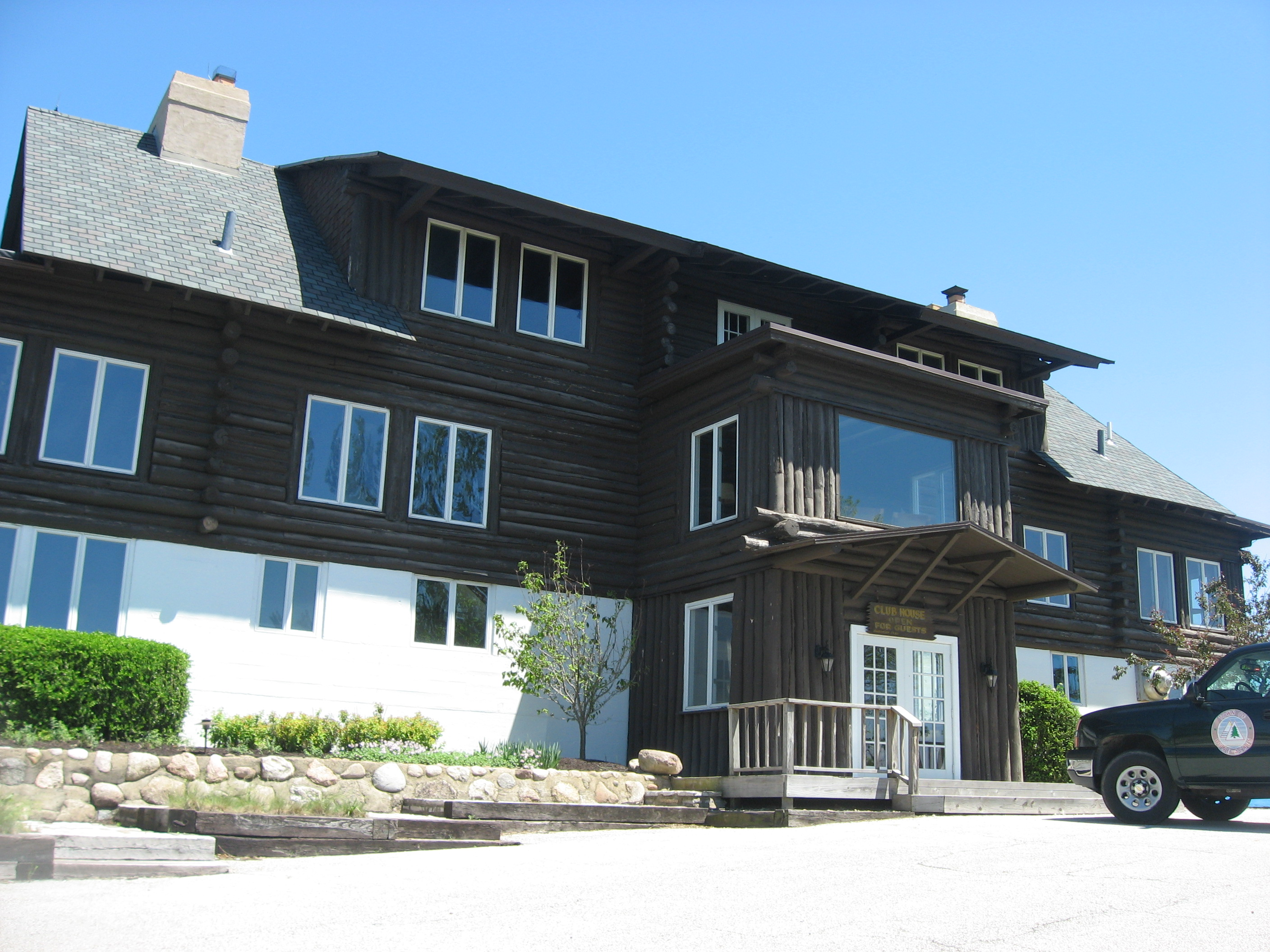
- The Dune Acres Clubhouse

- Logo

- Location of Dune Acres in Porter County, Indiana.
- Coordinates: 41°38′57″N 87°05′48″W
- Country: United States
- State: Indiana
- County: Porter
- Township: Westchester

Area
  - Total: 3.39 sq mi (8.79 km^{2})
  - Land: 2.13 sq mi (5.51 km^{2})
  - Water: 1.27 sq mi (3.28 km^{2})
- Elevation: 650 ft (200 m)

Population (2020)
  - Total: 234
  - Density: 110.0/sq mi (42.48/km^{2})
- Time zone: UTC-6 (CST)
  - Summer (DST): UTC-5 (CDT)
- ZIP code: 46304
- FIPS code: 18-18982
- GNIS feature ID: 2396691
- Website: http://www.duneacres.org/

Dune Acres is a town in Westchester Township, Porter County, in the U.S. state of Indiana. The population was 234 as of the 2020 census. Dune Acres is located in the duneland of the south shore of Lake Michigan. Many residents of Dune Acres and surrounding communities helped preserve parts of the Indiana Dunes.

== History ==
Dune Acres was platted in 1923 as a lakeside resort village.

The Dune Acres Clubhouse was listed on the National Register of Historic Places in 2007.

== Geography ==
According to the 2010 census, Dune Acres has a total area of 3.44 square miles (8.91 km^{2}), of which 2.17 square miles (5.62 km^{2}) (or 63.08%) is land and 1.27 square miles (3.29 km^{2}) (or 36.92%) is water.

== Demographics ==
Historical population
Census	Pop.	Note	%±
1930	12		—
1940	46		283.3%
1950	86		87.0%
1960	238		176.7%
1970	301		26.5%
1980	291		−3.3%
1990	263		−9.6%
2000	213		−19.0%
2010	182		−14.6%
2020	234		28.6%
U.S. Decennial Census

=== 2010 census ===
As of the census of 2010, there were 182 people, 94 households, and 58 families residing in the town. The population density was 83.9 inhabitants per square mile (32.4/km^{2}). There were 163 housing units at an average density of 75.1 per square mile (29.0/km^{2}). The racial makeup of the town was 95.1% White, 1.1% African American, 2.2% Asian, 0.5% from other races, and 1.1% from two or more races. Hispanic or Latino of any race were 1.6% of the population.

There were 94 households, of which 10.6% had children under the age of 18 living with them, 60.6% were married couples living together, 1.1% had a female householder with no husband present, and 38.3% were non-families. 33.0% of all households were made up of individuals, and 13.9% had someone living alone who was 65 years of age or older. The average household size was 1.94 and the average family size was 2.41.

The median age in the town was 63.4 years. 8.8% of residents were under the age of 18; 3.1% were between the ages of 18 and 24; 4.3% were from 25 to 44; 36.8% were from 45 to 64; and 46.7% were 65 years of age or older. The gender makeup of the town was 52.2% male and 47.8% female.

=== 2000 census ===
As of the census of 2000, there were 213 people, 101 households, and 76 families residing in the town. The population density was 99.7 inhabitants per square mile (38.5/km^{2}). There were 154 housing units at an average density of 72.0 per square mile (27.8/km^{2}). The racial makeup of the town was 99.06% White, and 0.94% from two or more races. Hispanic or Latino of any race were 1.41% of the population.

There were 101 households, out of which 13.9% had children under the age of 18 living with them, 67.3% were married couples living together, 5.0% had a female householder with no husband present, and 23.8% were non-families. 20.8% of all households were made up of individuals, and 13.9% had someone living alone who was 65 years of age or older. The average household size was 2.11 and the average family size was 2.39.

In the town, the population was spread out, with 11.7% under the age of 18, 3.3% from 18 to 24, 13.1% from 25 to 44, 33.8% from 45 to 64, and 38.0% who were 65 years of age or older. The median age was 60 years. For every 100 females, there were 104.8 males. For every 100 females age 18 and over, there were 97.9 males.

The median income for a household in the town was $94,843, and the median income for a family was $102,524. Males had a median income of $83,632 versus $41,250 for females. The per capita income for the town was $68,051. None of the population or families were below the poverty line.

== Transportation ==
In the past, Dune Acres was served by the eponymous station on the South Shore Line, which was located at Mineral Springs Road. That station was closed in 1994 as part of NICTD's effort to consolidate the line's Porter County stations. Since then, the community has been served by the Dune Park station. V-Line's Orange Line route stops at the station Friday-Sunday, allowing Dune Acres residents to connect to Valparaiso (and vice versa). Coach USA's Tri-State/United Limo Service stops at the nearby town of Portage, providing a direct connecting to Chicago's O'Hare Airport.

Dunes Highway (U.S. Route 12) is the closest highway to Dune Acres. The closest airport is located in western Gary, and the closest Amtrak station is located further northeast in Michigan City.

== Notable people ==
- Jim Gaffigan, comedian
- Jack Knight, Aviation pioneer

== See also ==
- Long Beach
- Michiana Shores
- Miller Beach
- Ogden Dunes
- Porter Beach
- Beverly Shores
