= ChicaGo Dash =

Bus service between Chicago, Illinois, and Valparaiso, Indiana, US

- Founded: October 6, 2008
- Headquarters: 166 Lincolnway
- Service area: Valparaiso to Chicago
- Service type: Express bus service
- Routes: 1
- Stops: 4
- Destinations: Valparaiso, Downtown Chicago
- Stations: 1 (Valparaiso Transit Center)
- Fleet: 5
- Daily ridership: 120
- Operator: City of Valparaiso
- Website: ci.valparaiso.in.us

ChicaGo Dash is an express bus service between Valparaiso, Indiana, and Chicago, Illinois, covering a one-way distance of about 52 miles. It is jointly run by the city of Valparaiso and the Valparaiso Redevelopment Commission, with financial support from the Northwest Indiana Regional Development Authority and the Federal Transit Administration. It was launched on October 6, 2008.

== History ==
ChicaGo Dash began in 2008 as a way for residents of the greater Valparaiso area to commute to work in downtown Chicago. Historically, jobs in downtown Chicago have offered higher salaries than those found in Northwest Indiana. Prior to the service, those wishing to work in Chicago had to either drive to the South Shore train station in Chesterton, Indiana (a 20+ minute drive from Valparaiso) or drive themselves to Chicago.

In May 2009, Valparaiso's V-Line introduced a shuttle service between Dune Park South Shore Line station and the Village Station later in the evening to supplement ChicaGo Dash and provide additional commuting options. It was scheduled to remain in place for the remainder of 2009. On February 1, 2010, the shuttle service was eliminated due to low ridership.

Also in May 2009, ChicaGo Dash launched a special summer Saturday service. The bus left the Village Station at 10:00 am and arrived at Water Tower Place at 12:05 PM, making stops at Millennium Park and Navy Pier. The bus left Water Tower Place at 6:00 PM, arriving at the Village Station at 8:00 PM. On August 17, 2009, ChicaGo Dash extended its Saturday service into the fall and added a second bus. Its schedule was designed to attract Valparaiso University students who were interested in visiting Chicago in the evening. The new bus left the Village Station at 3:00 PM and returned at midnight, making the same stops as the other bus. The weekend route made a stop at Valparaiso University's Harre Union at 9:15 AM and 2:15 PM before arriving at the Village Station. This section of the route was essentially a free shuttle service – once they reached the Village Station, passengers had half an hour to buy tickets to go the rest of the way. On November 12, 2009, ChicaGo Dash decided to cancel the second Saturday bus, citing low ridership; on December 27, 2009, Saturday service was canceled completely.

Valparaiso officials have previously considered adding a stop at Hobart. During the spring of 2010, Hobart officials conducted surveys of Hobart's population to determine whether there was enough interest in the stop. A test run was slated to occur sometime in October 2010. A stop in Hobart was not established at that time; the issue was revisited in 2022, though this again did not lead to the establishment of another stop.

In 2013, the ChicaGo Dash introduced a bus tracking system using the "DoubleMap" mobile app which also worked for the city's V-Line bus service. The tracking could also be viewed through the city's website. The system was superseded by the new "Valpo Transit" app in the early 2020s.

In 2017, the city acquired a vacant industrial site on the south side and began a public-private partnership with Journeyman Distillery to convert the site into a new transit center with parking space for the ChicaGo Dash service as well as a private development. The property was revamped as a distillery, restaurant, and event facility; the Transit Center portion opened in October 2024, at which point the ChicaGo Dash stop in Valparaiso was shifted over from the Village Station.

In 2019, the shuttle to the Dune Park South Shore Line station was resumed; however, the COVID-19 pandemic in 2020 hindered adoption, with further issues arising from a required bus transfer during construction on the South Shore Line. The shuttle service was again suspended on January 1, 2024.

== Tickets ==
As of September 1, 2022, one-way ChicaGo Dash tickets are $9.00. Riders can also buy round-trip tickets ($18.00), 10-ride passes ($80.00), and monthly passes ($250.00), with the latter based on the calendar month. One-way tickets may be purchased on the bus (using exact change only), with the additional options available through the "Token Transit" mobile app; accepted payment methods include Visa, MasterCard, American Express, WageWorks, RTA Transit Benefits, personal checks, and most commuter benefits debit cards.

== Current route and service times ==
ChicaGo Dash travels between Valparaiso's Transit Center and downtown Chicago, Illinois. There are currently three stops in Chicago: at the Michigan Street/Randolph Street intersection near Millennium Park, at the LaSalle Street/Wacker Drive intersection, and in front of 333 S. Franklin St (morning only) or in front of 350 S. Clark St (evening only). There is currently one stop in Valparaiso at 252 S. Campbell Street (the Transit Center).

The service is rush-hour only – it makes four trips from Valparaiso to Chicago in the morning and four trips from Chicago to Valparaiso in the evening from Monday through Thursday. As of November 1, 2025, the service makes only two trips in the morning and in the evening on Fridays.

Monday–Thursday AM schedule:

Stop	BUS 1	BUS 2	BUS 3	BUS 4
Valpo Transit Center	5:30 am	6:00 am	6:30 am	7:10 am
333 S. Franklin, Chicago	6:50 am	7:20 am	7:50 am	8:30 am
LaSalle/Wacker, Chicago	7:00 am	7:30 am	8:00 am	8:40 am
Michigan/Randolph, Chicago	7:10 am	7:40 am	8:10 am	8:50 am

Monday–Thursday PM schedule:

Stop	BUS 1	BUS 2	BUS 3	BUS 4
Michigan/Randolph, Chicago	3:45 pm	4:10 pm	4:30 pm	5:15 pm
LaSalle/Wacker, Chicago	3:55 pm	4:20 pm	4:40 pm	5:25 pm
350 S. Clark, Chicago	4:05 pm	4:30 pm	4:50 pm	5:35 pm
Valpo Transit Center	5:25 pm	5:50 pm	6:10 pm	6:55 pm

Friday AM schedule:

Stop	BUS 1	BUS 2
Valpo Transit Center	6:00 am	7:10 am
333 S. Franklin, Chicago	7:20 am	8:30 am
LaSalle/Wacker, Chicago	7:30 am	8:40 am
Michigan/Randolph, Chicago	7:40 am	8:50 am

Friday PM schedule:

Stop	BUS 1	BUS 2
Michigan/Randolph, Chicago	4:10 pm	5:15 pm
LaSalle/Wacker, Chicago	4:20 pm	5:25 pm
350 S. Clark, Chicago	4:30 pm	5:35 pm
Valpo Transit Center	5:50 pm	6:55 pm

== See also ==
- Calumet (train)
- V-Line
