= Tremont station (Indiana) =

Former South Shore Line station in Indiana

Tremont
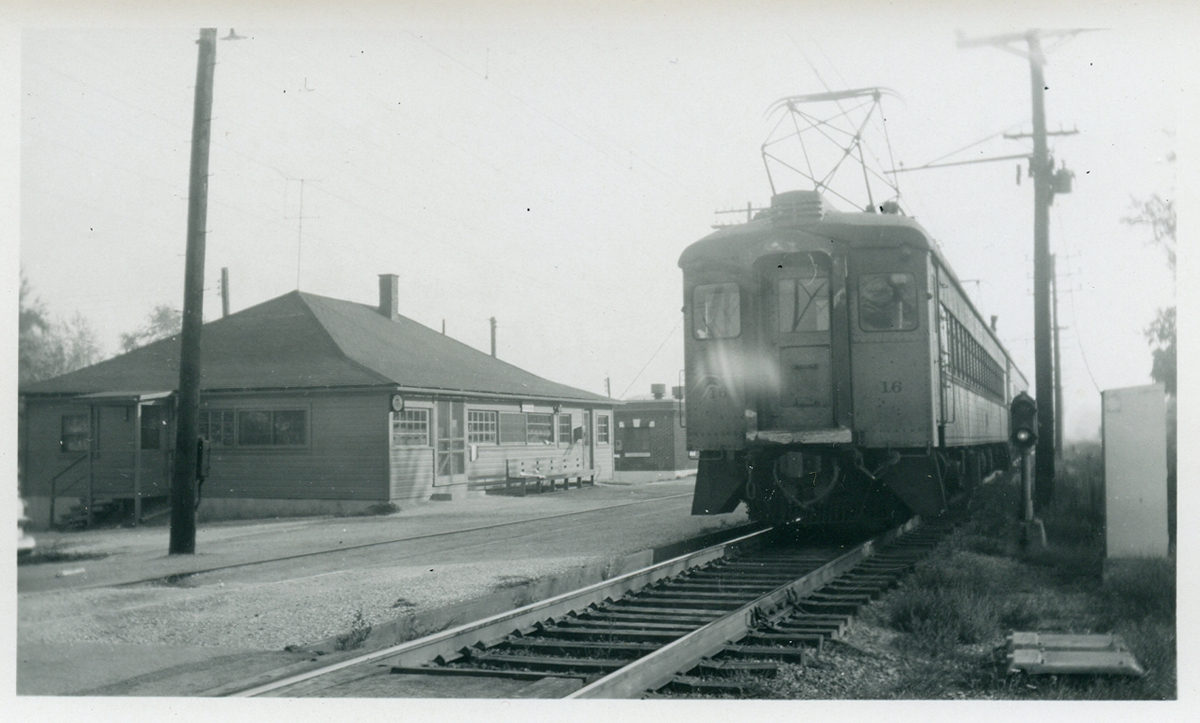
- Tremont in October 1960

General information
- Location: Tremont Road; Tremont, Indiana 46304
- Coordinates: 41.64947°N 87.04824°W
- Owner: CSS&SB
- Platforms: 1 side platform
- Tracks: 1

History
- Opened: c. 1908
- Closed: June 2, 1986

Services
Preceding station	Chicago South Shore and South Bend Railroad	Following station
Dune Acres toward Randolph Street	South Shore Line	Kemil Road toward South Bend (Washington Street)
Location

Tremont was a flag stop on the South Shore Line located at Tremont Road in Porter County, Indiana. The station was built by the Chicago, Lake Shore and South Bend Railway and opened c. 1908, serving its namesake town and later the Indiana Dunes.

In 1979, the Northwestern Indiana Regional Planning Commission and the Northern Indiana Commuter Transportation District (NICTD) conducted a study for the improvement of the South Shore Rail Corridor. The study recommended the construction of new station at Indiana 49 and US 12, a location within 1 mile (1.6 km) of both the Tremont and Port Chester stops. The study also recommended closing Port Chester and Pines due to low ridership, but keeping the Tremont, Ogden Dunes, Midwest Steel, Bailly, Dune Acres, and Beverly Shores stations open. Land acquisition for the new station (Dune Park) occurred in October 1982.

A new entrance to the Indiana Dunes for bikers and hikers was added at Tremont Road, half a block from the South Shore station, in 1982. The entrance officially opened on the July 4 weekend, coinciding with the expansion of South Shore service to the Tremont station. Two westbound trains were added during the morning rush, four westbound trains on weekends, and one late-night train was added on Saturdays.

As progress continued on Dune Park, plans continued to evolve. By late 1984, NICTD had intended to convert Tremont into a weekend-only stop and have Dune Acres remain a flag stop once Dune Park opened. The following year NICTD changed course, deciding instead to close both Tremont and Dune Acres with the opening of the new Dune Park station. However, ridership increases at both stops after the study was taken caused the agency to consider waiting to close one or both stations until after overflow parking could be added at Dune Park. Ultimately, Tremont closed on June 2, 1986, with the opening of Dune Park. Dune Acres closed in 1994 once the additional parking lots at Dune Park were complete.
