= Tremont, Indiana =

Tremont
- Ghost town
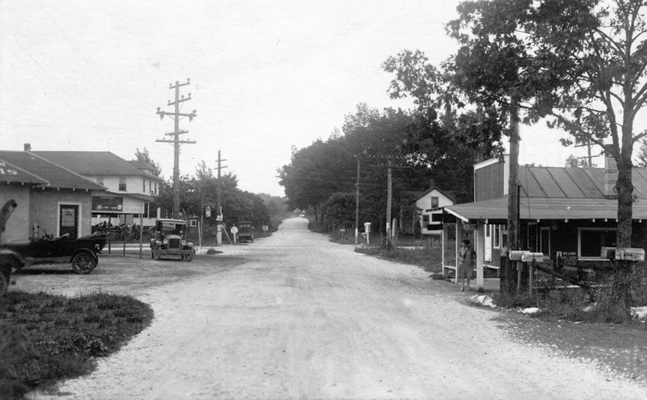
- Tremont business district, circa 1920s

- Location of Porter in the state of Indiana
- Coordinates: 41°38′55″N 87°02′37″W
- Country: United States
- State: Indiana
- County: Porter
- Township: Westchester
- Established as New City West: 1833
- Refounded as Tremont: 1908
- Abandoned: 1960s

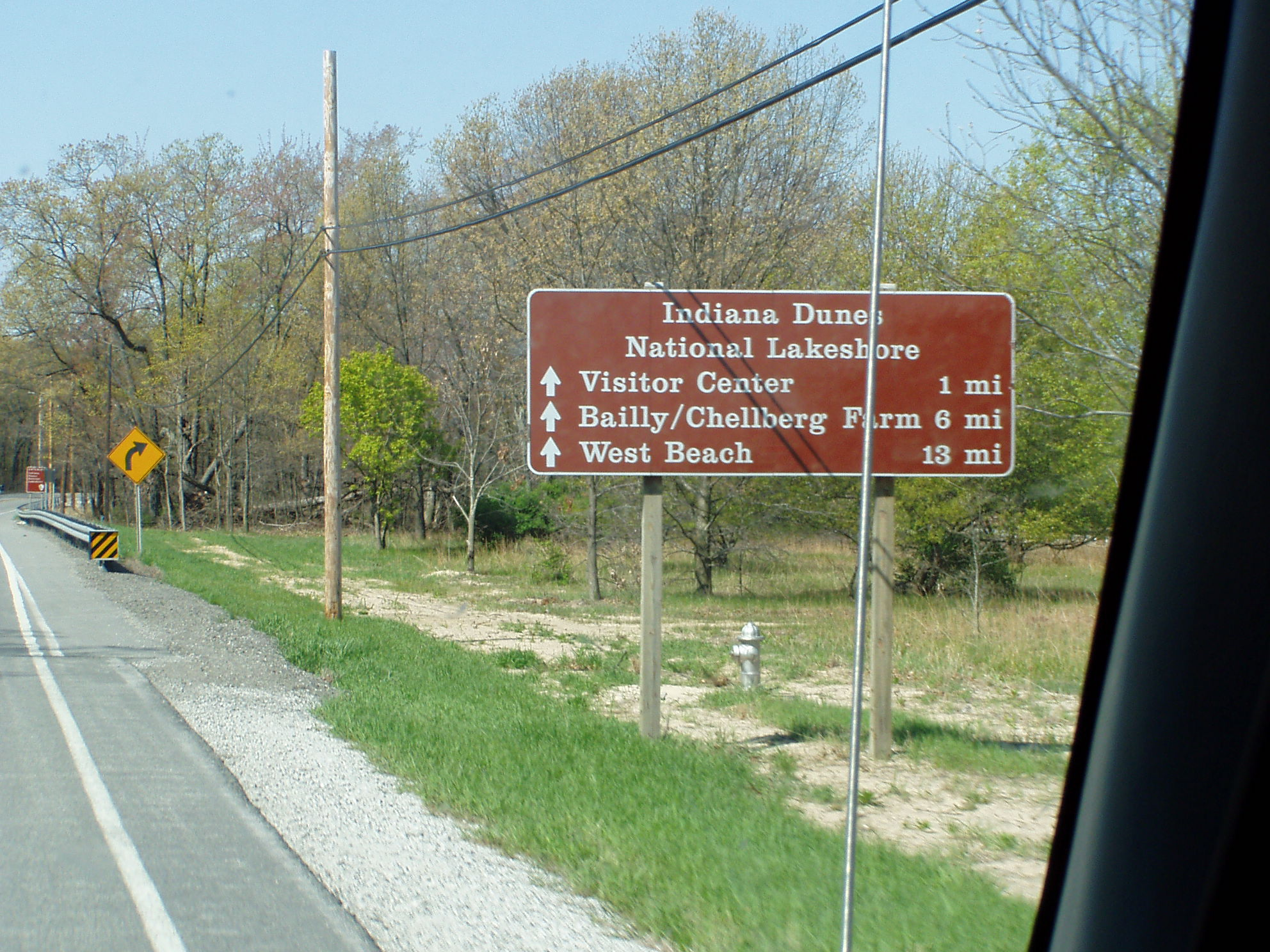
US 12 running through the former town of Tremont--note urban fire hydrant under the brown sign.

Tremont, Indiana, is a ghost town formerly located in what is now the Indiana Dunes State Park and Indiana Dunes National Park in Westchester Township in northern Porter County, Indiana. It was first established in 1833. It was located at the intersection of U.S. Highway 12 and County Road 100 East, near Indiana 49. The community is named for three massive sand dunes that are now contained within the State park. They are Mount Tom (200 feet (61 m) above the surrounding area), Mount Holden 170 feet (52 m), and Mount Green 160 feet (49 m).

== History ==
Tremont was originally established as New City West after City West, a settlement on the nearby shore of Lake Michigan that seemed prosperous in the mid-1830s. City West intended to become a large harbor settlement to rival Chicago, which was a small town at the time and had not yet been incorporated. However, after the Panic of 1837, City West was abandoned, becoming a ghost town without a single resident, and subsequently burnt to the ground. Despite the end of its namesake, New City West still maintained the City West Post Office and City West School. About 20 houses were built in the new city after City West collapsed, and a sawmill, cooper shop, and brickyard were established.

In 1853 the City West Post Office was consolidated with the Calumet Post Office, with D. H. Hopkins as postmaster. The Alanson Green Tavern became a popular stop for tourists in the 1850s and 60s; they would dine while their stagecoach drivers exchanged horses. During the same period, New City West served as major station in the Underground Railroad. However, in 1875 a boiler explosion destroyed the New City West sawmill. The prosperity of the city ended, and it was largely deserted sometime after 1876.

Later, by 1908, New City West became commonly called Tremont due to the establishment of a station by that name on the South Shore Line, an electric interurban railroad line that skirted the heart of the Indiana Dunes and provided Tremont's most important rail service. Because of its adjacency to this railway, descriptions of the history of the Dunes often mention Tremont. For example, the Prairie Club beach house built in 1913 by landscape preservationist Jens Jensen and a group of friends was built in Tremont, close to the rail line. In 1929, "scarcely a building of New City West survived"; however, new buildings on the site of the old city led to its repopulation as the summer resort town of Tremont.

Tremont was always an unincorporated community, but grew to some extent during the early twentieth century and had its own commuter railroad station on the South Shore. The creation of the Indiana Dunes National Lakeshore in the 1960s, and subsequent land condemnation proceedings, caused the remaining community to disperse.

== Heritage ==
The Indiana Dunes, including the Tremont area, played a role in the creation of The Nature Conservancy and inspired conservation efforts.

Part of the former village of Tremont remains built upon, as the South Shore Line's current NICTD headquarters building and station is located adjacent to the former village center. The original Tremont railroad station was built somewhat east of the current Dune Park station and parking lots.

== Historic images ==
- Porter County GenWeb
- An 1856 map showing "New City West"
