= East Chicago station =

South Shore Line station in Indiana

East Chicago
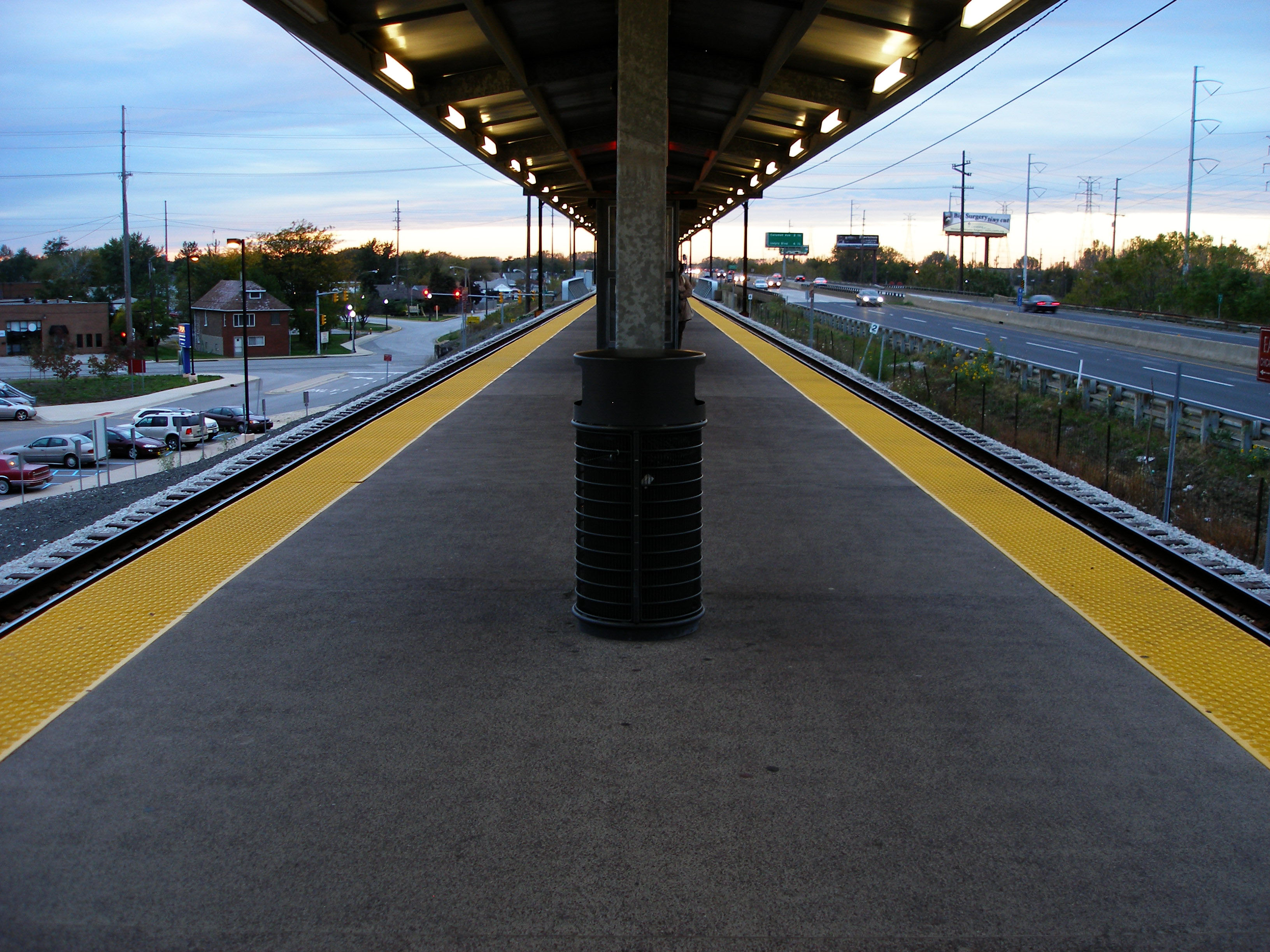

General information
- Location: 5615 Indianapolis Boulevard; East Chicago, Indiana
- Coordinates: 41°36′43″N 87°28′46″W
- Owner: NICTD
- Platforms: 1 island platform
- Tracks: 2
- Connections: East Chicago Bus Transit and Gary Public Transportation Corporation Buses

Construction
- Parking: 1,200 spaces
- Accessible: Yes

Other information
- Fare zone: 4

History
- Opened: 1956
- Rebuilt: 1982, 2004

Passengers
- 2019: 1,493 (average weekday)

Services
Preceding station	NICTD	Following station
Hammond Gateway toward Millennium Station	Lakeshore Corridor	Gary/Chicago Airport toward South Bend International Airport
Track layout
Location

East Chicago is a train station at 5615 Indianapolis Boulevard in East Chicago, Indiana. It serves the South Shore Line commuter rail line from Chicago, Illinois to South Bend, Indiana.

== History ==
The station was built as part of a South Shore Line project that removed a street running section on Chicago Avenue and placed the line on an elevated roadbed parallel to the Indiana Toll Road in order to improve speed and mitigate traffic issues. It opened on September 16, 1956, though the station building was completed later. Prior to this, South Shore Line trains stopped in downtown East Chicago at a storefront station at the corner of Chicago and Forsyth. In 2004 the station was remodeled with high level platforms to provide accessibility, and to decrease station dwell times.

== Facilities ==
East Chicago consists of a single high-level island platform situated between two gauntlet tracks which permit the passage of freight trains. The northern track provides service to Chicago while the southern track services Michigan City and South Bend. At this location the South Shore Line is situated on an embankment and the platform traverses Indianapolis Boulevard. The station building is located east of Indianapolis Boulevard at ground level. The station is equipped with ticket vending machines; staffed service ended in 2017. Adjacent to the station is a parking lot with capacity for 1,200 cars.

NICTD approved a $4.4-million construction project in March 2019 to increase passenger access at East Chicago.

== Bus connections ==
East Chicago Transit

- Route 1
- Route 2
- Route 4

GPTC

- Route R1: Lakeshore Connection
