= Gary/Chicago Airport station =

South Shore Line station in Indiana

Gary/Chicago Airport at Clark Road
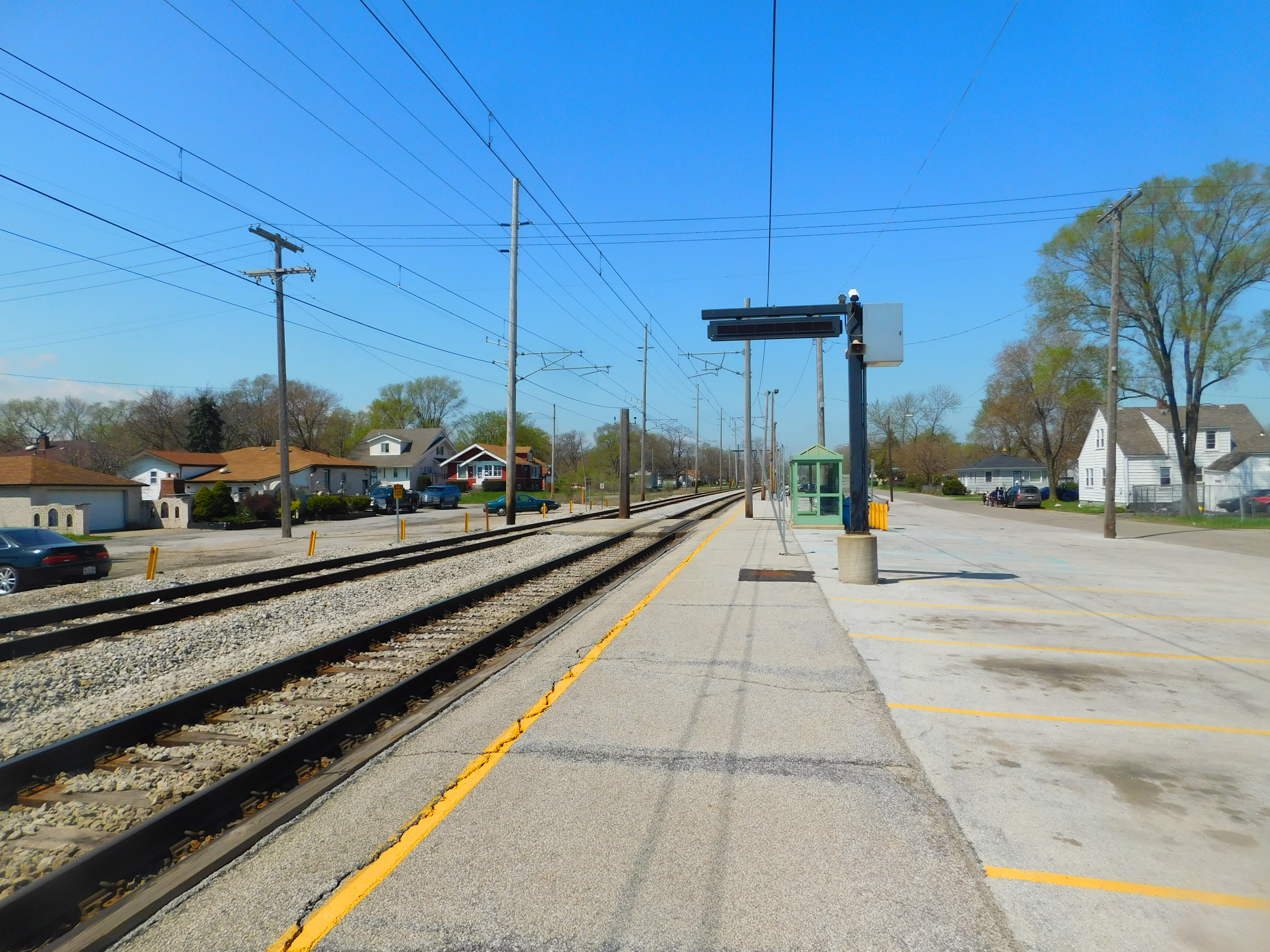
- Gary/Chicago Airport station in April 2016

General information
- Location: Clark Road and 2nd Place; Gary, Indiana
- Coordinates: 41°36′20″N 87°23′38.5″W
- Owner: NICTD
- Platforms: 1 side platform
- Tracks: 2
- Connections: GPTC: R1

Construction
- Parking: Yes
- Accessible: No

Other information
- Fare zone: 5

History
- Electrified: 1,500 V DC
- Former names: Clark Road

Passengers
- 2019: 80 (average weekday)

Services
Preceding station	NICTD	Following station
East Chicago toward Millennium Station	Lakeshore Corridor	Gary Metro Center toward South Bend International Airport
Former services
Preceding station	NICTD	Following station
East Chicago toward Randolph Street	South Shore Line	Ambridge Closed 1994 toward South Bend
Track layout
Location

Gary/Chicago Airport station (also known as Clark Road) is a South Shore Line train station located in the Brunswick neighborhood of Gary, Indiana. It is located on Clark Road about 1.1 miles (1.8 km) southeast of the Gary/Chicago International Airport terminal. The station has a single side platform on the north side of the two-track line, with an asphalt pedestrian crossing for the southern track. It is a flag stop.
