= V-Line =

Bus service in Valparaiso, Indiana, US

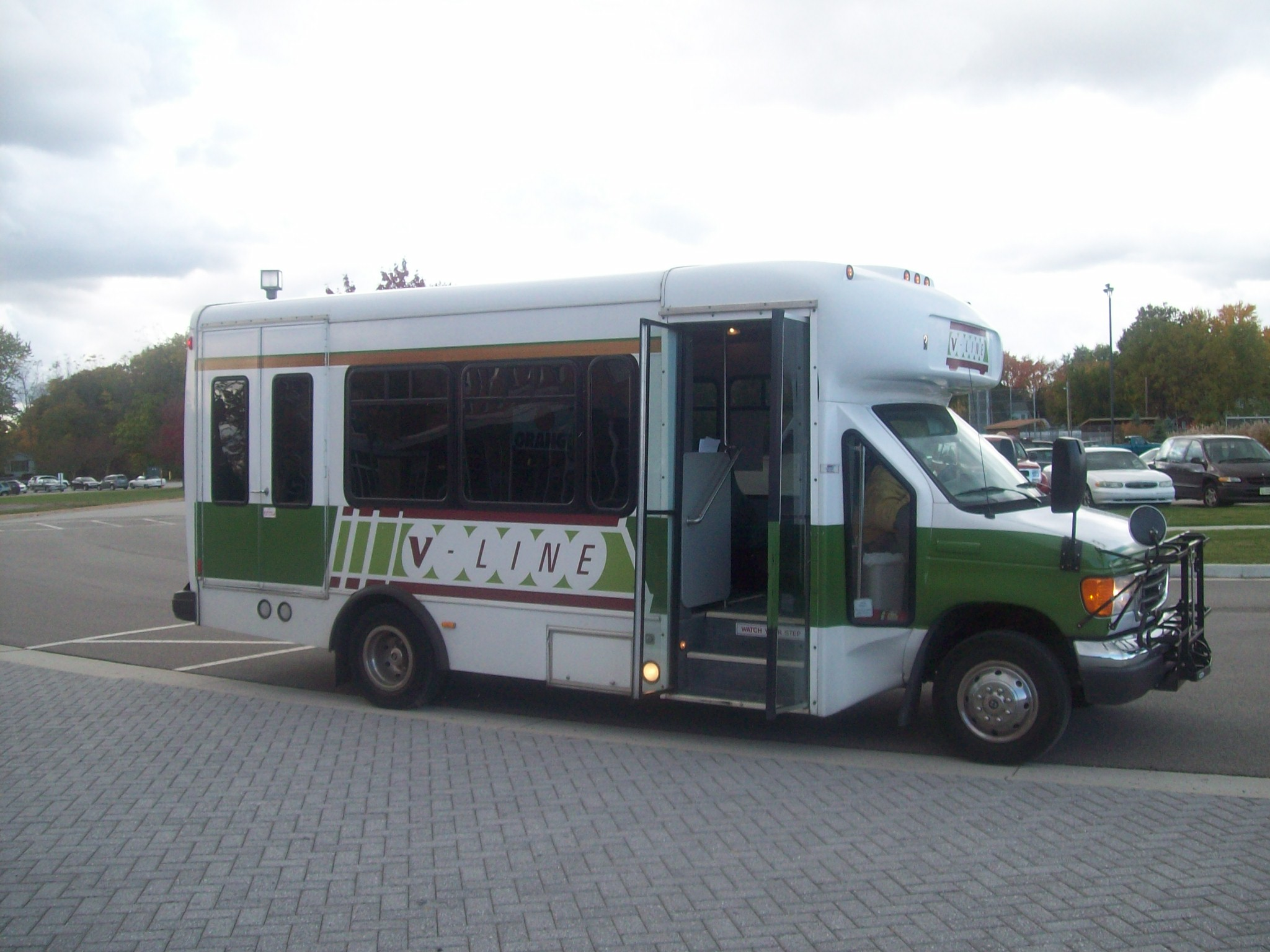
- Orange Line route bus stops at Valparaiso University.
- Parent: City of Valparaiso
- Founded: 2007
- Headquarters: 166 Lincolnway
- Locale: Valparaiso, Indiana
- Service area: Valparaiso, Dune Park.
- Service type: Deviated fixed route
- Routes: 6
- Hubs: 1
- Fleet: 5
- Annual ridership: 179,378 (2013)
- Fuel type: Gasoline
- Operator: Ride Right (beginning September 2010)
- Chief executive: Taylor Wegrzyn, Transit Manager
- Website: V-Line

The V-Line is the local bus operation in Valparaiso, Indiana. Service began on October 1, 2007, making Valparaiso one of the smallest cities in the United States to have its own independent public transit system.

== Operations ==
The V-line was originally operated by McDonald Transit, a national transit operator primarily serving universities. Ride Right took over the operations in Fall 2010. In Valparaiso, the bus mostly serves the elderly and students of Valparaiso University. Commuters within the city also use it, but it is secondary to personal vehicles as a mode of transit.

The system consists of 104 stops along 4 lines. The Green Line, Yellow Line, Red line, and Brown Line operate in the city of Valparaiso on weekdays and weekends. These three lines run as "flexible fixed" routes, meaning they have standard, scheduled stops which can be altered en route to meet the needs of those who cannot otherwise reach the bus. The fourth line, the Orange Line, operates express between downtown, a stop near Valparaiso University, and the Dune Park South Shore rail. The line does not operate when NICTD conducts track and catenary repairs.

The system was started using a $615,000 federal grant. Until early 2008, the system used rented minibuses with a 16–24-person capacity. In January 2008, new buses of similar capacity were delivered. A standard one-way fare costs $1.00 with one free transfer. Passengers are expressly forbidden from using the transfer on the same route. Senior citizens, students, children 5–18, and disabled persons can ride for half. Young children (under age 4) and Valparaiso University students ride for free.

== History of service changes ==
In August 2009, Valparaiso officials announced a series of changes that went into effect at the end of the month. First and foremost, V-Line gained a new Red Line route, which began service August 28, 2009. It is essentially an alternate version of the Orange Line route – the buses that would previously sit idle during the scheduling breaks now travel around the city, overlapping with Green Line, Yellow Line and Brown Line buses. During Sundays, it serves as an alternative to Yellow and Green Line routes, which don't operate on the first days of the week. The Red Line route is added on experimental basis for three months – if it does well, it will be made permanent. Since then, the Red Line has become a permanent route for Fridays, Saturdays, and Sundays. It runs in a loop around the city before turning into the Orange Line route and running to the Dune Park NICTD trains station.

In addition to introducing the Red Line, V-Line rearranged the schedules for the other routes. For the Orange Line, the fall-spring Friday and Saturday service was truncated from 1:00 AM to 10:20 PM and 10:00 PM, respectively. As a result, Saturday and Sunday schedules became identical. By contrast, Yellow and Green Line route schedules were extended, running an hour later than before. Brown Line route was expanded, adding service to Ivy Tech and the Valparaiso Walk shopping complex. In December 2013, the Brown Line route expanded its hours. It now begins at 12PM.

After South Shore Line adjusted its weekend schedule on November 22, 2009, V-Line adjusted Orange Line and Red Line weekend schedules. Orange Line route's service hours shifted, running between 9:15 AM and 11:05 PM. The wait times at Dune Park station were shifted to allow the bus to connect to both eastbound and westbound trains (something that the previous version of the schedule rarely allowed). Red Line's service hours were shifted and extended - it now started at 8:15 AM rather than 7:45 AM and ended at 11:55 PM rather than 10:35 PM. The decrease in the number of weekend trains allowed Valparaiso officials to increase Red Line's service frequencies during morning and evening hours.

On December 3, 2009, V-Line General Manager Ryan Landers stated that system ridership was down for all lines. He also explained that while Red Line ridership was climbing, it was still significantly below the numbers for other routes, remaining in double digits. Landers explained that he would like to keep the Red Line running for another six months - if the ridership doesn't pick up significantly, he will be forced to shut it down. Finally, he noted that while he would like to buy more vehicles in order to allow for shorter headways, the system can't afford them as of this writing.

On May 15, 2010, the V-Line summer schedule was altered. Whereas before, Brown Line route was shut down while Orange Line route continued operating at reduced hours, this time around Orange, Brown and Red routes were completely shut down for the entire duration of the summer schedule.

In the spring of 2010, the City of Valparaiso expressed its desire to consolidate operations of V-Line and ChicaGo Dash, bringing both systems under the same operator by fall 2010, when the current contracts expire. It was hoped that consolidation would save money. Ultimately, though, the city decided to switch to a new contractor for V-Line and leave ChicaGo Dash as is. The city is also considering revamping the current routes, but no clear plans have been announced at this time.

In May 2011, the city of Valparaiso considered altering the schedule the same way as the previous summer. However, the feedback from the riders convinced it to merely cut the Brown Line route for the summer and leave Orange Line and Red Line routes as is. In addition, the Green Line, Yellow Line and Red Line routes were temporarily altered to make up for the gaps in service that resulted from the suspension of the Brown Line route.

In December 2013, the City of Valparaiso began a route study of the V-Line bus service. The study will finish in Spring 2014. The results of the study will aid in determining what changes are needed to the bus service to provide the best service possible with the resources at hand.

== Routes ==
Green Line - Ivy Tech to Porter's Vale to Vale Park Rd.
Yellow Line - Andover Plaza to Downtown to Bullseye Lake Rd.
Brown Line - Ivy Tech to Porter's Vale to Valparaiso Marketplace to Downtown
Orange Line - Dune Park Station to Valparaiso University and Downtown GoDash bus station
Red Line - Bullseye Lake Road to Downtown to Vale Park Rd. (discontinued)
Purple Line - Andover Plaza to Downtown to Valparaiso University to Strong Bow Center to Andover Plaza (discontinued)

== Ridership Statistics ==
=== 2008 ===
Month	Total	Yellow Line	Green Line	Brown Line	Orange Line
January	n/a	n/a	n/a	n/a	n/a
February	n/a	n/a	n/a	n/a	377
March	3,133	1,116	1,136	638	243
April	4,085	1,207	1,178	1,405	295
May	3,585	1,350	1,288	769	178
June	n/a	n/a	n/a	--	n/a
July	n/a	n/a	n/a	--	n/a
August	4,819	1,843	2,039	734	203
September	6,512	1,738	1,543	2,744	487
October	7,023	2,045	1,875	2,527	576
November	5,822	1,745	1,567	1,941	569
December	5,389	1,615	1,727	1,858	189

=== 2009 ===
Month	Total	Yellow Line	Green Line	Brown Line	Orange Line	Red Line
January	6,412	1,801	2,034	2,235	342	--
February	6,307	1,627	1,849	2,383	403	--
March	5,683	2,135	2,104	1,158	285	--
April	6,320	1,956	1,847	2,164	535	--
May	4,964	1,924	1,925	910	205	--
June	4,224	2,090	2,069	--	65	--
July	4,089	1,896	2,120	--	73	--
August	n/a	1,919	2,119	n/a	n/a	n/a
September	5,570	1,850	1,985	1,421	261	53
October	5,885	app 2,000	app 2,000	1,372	350	44
November	5,030	app 1,900	app 1,900	857	309	56
December	4,640	1,656	1,865	859	211	49

=== 2010 ===
Month	Total	Yellow Line	Green Line	Brown Line	Orange Line	Red Line
January	5,525	1,801	1,789	1,563	234	37
February	5,672	1,890	2,019	1,376	333	54
March	5,741	2,396	2,460	712	148	35
April	5,965	2,356	2,290	1,039	218	62
May	4,323	1,969	1,807	461	61	25
June	n/a	n/a	n/a	--	--	--
July	n/a	n/a	n/a	--	--	--
August	6,262	2,498	2,578	1,103	51	32
September	7,238	2,356	2,343	2,115	298	126
October	7,486	2,550	2,327	2,108	338	163
November	n/a	n/a	n/a	n/a	n/a	n/a
December	6,770	2,621	2,332	1,483	186	148

=== 2011 ===
Month	Total	Yellow Line	Green Line	Brown Line	Orange Line	Red Line
January	8,136	2,927	2,410	2,290	359	150
February	7,088	2,734	2,203	1,632	341	178
March	7,791	3,131	2,734	1,433	320	173
April	7,162	2,570	2,391	1,582	404	177

== See also ==
- List of bus transit systems in the United States
- Valpo Local
