= Kemil Road station =

Former South Shore Line station in Indiana

Kemil Road

General information
- Location: Kemil Road and U.S. Route 12; Porter County, Indiana
- Coordinates: 41°39′48.14″N 87°0′34.6″W
- Owner: NICTD
- Tracks: 1

Other information
- Fare zone: 7

History
- Opened: 1977
- Closed: July 5, 1994

Former services
| Preceding station | NICTD | Following station |
|---|---|---|
| Dune Park toward Randolph Street | South Shore Line | Beverly Shores toward South Bend Airport |
Location

Kemil Road was a South Shore Line flag stop located at the corner of Kemil Road and U.S. 12 in Porter County, Indiana. The stop was located at the eastern edge of the Indiana Dunes State Park. It was established in 1977 on the initiative of South Shore Recreation, a citizens group, and closed in 1994.

== History ==
The original Chicago, Lake Shore and South Bend Railway, which opened in 1908, included a stop named Keiser at the same location as Kemil Road. With the opening of the Indiana Dunes State Park in the 1920s Keiser was at the southeast corner of the park.

The stop closed prior to 1977. That year, the newly formed South Shore Recreation group pressed the Chicago South Shore and South Bend Railroad to create a flag stop at Kemil Road to improve access to the park. The Tremont station, further west, served the park's main entrance, but the Kemil Road location would let passengers directly into the park's interior.

The railroad estimated the cost of the stop at $700 ($3719 in 2025 adjusted for inflation) but initially refused to pay for it. After Lois Weisberg, one of the group's founders, wrote a personal check to cover the cost, the railroad agreed to construction in exchange for Weisberg moderating her public criticism of the railroad and its president, Albert Dudley. The new stop consisted of a gravel platform adjacent to the road. Contemporary marketing materials showed trail systems linking Kemil Road with Dune Acres, a station at the west edge of the park.

The stop closed on July 5, 1994, as part of an NICTD service revision which also saw the closure of Ambridge, Willard Avenue, LaLumiere, Rolling Prairie, and New Carlisle.
