= 1993 South Shore Line collision =

Railway accident in Indiana in 1993

Details
- Date: January 18, 1993; 33 years ago 9:34 a.m. CST
- Location: Gary, Indiana
- Country: United States
- Line: South Shore Line (Lakeshore Corridor)
- Incident type: Head-on collision
- Cause: Operator error

Statistics
- Trains: 2
- Deaths: 7 (4 on eastbound train, 3 on westbound train)
- Injured: 70
- Damage: $854,000

On January 18, 1993, two South Shore Line trains collided head-on in Gary, Indiana, killing 7 people and injuring 70 people.

== Background ==
The trains operated on the South Shore Line, an electric interurban railway operated by the Northern Indiana Commuter Transportation District (NICTD). Train 7 departed Chicago at 8:45 am bound for South Bend, consisting of two cars. Train 12 departed South Bend at 8:06 am bound for Chicago, consisting of three cars. All five railcars were passenger electric multiple units built by Nippon Sharyo between 1981 and 1983.

A total of approximately 100 passengers were on board both trains, a lower than typical number due to the Martin Luther King Jr. Day holiday.

=== Crew ===
Train 7 was operated by David Riordan. He had worked for the South Shore Line as a dispatcher and later an engineer. In a prior minor head-on collision accident in 1985, Riordan was working as a dispatcher and later reprimanded for failure to properly coordinate the movement of the two trains involved. While working as an engineer prior to the 1993 head-on collision, he has previously been reprimanded for speeding, failing to sound a horn at grade crossings, improper radio communications procedures, etc.

Train 12 was operated by Willard Blewett. He was an experienced senior motorman, having been promoted to engineer since 1956. There were no known violations on his employee record for at least three years preceding the accident.

== Investigation and cause ==
Riordan of train 7 failed to stop at a red stop signal, the lead cause to this accident. Blewett of train 12 did not apply emergency braking until impact, despite noticing danger. As both engineers were considered partly at fault, both engineers were fired following investigation.

The NTSB also suggested that the accident could have been if positive train control (PTC) was implemented. The NICTD eventually implemented PTC 25 years later in 2018.

== See also ==
- 1972 Chicago commuter rail crash
