= Ambridge station =

Former South Shore Line station in Indiana

Coordinates: 41.6056°N 87.3722°W

Ambridge

General information
- Location: Bridge Street, Gary, Indiana 46404
- Owner: NICTD
- Platforms: 2 Side platforms
- Tracks: 2

Other information
- Fare zone: 5

History
- Opened: 1920
- Closed: July 5, 1994

Services
Preceding station	NICTD	Following station
Gary Airport toward Randolph Street	South Shore Line	Gary Metro Center toward South Bend
Location

Ambridge was a South Shore Line flag stop located at Bridge Street in the Ambridge Mann neighborhood of Gary, Indiana. The station opened in 1920, and closed on July 5, 1994, as part of an NICTD service revision which also saw the closure of Kemil Road, Willard Avenue, LaLumiere, Rolling Prairie, and New Carlisle.
