= Carroll Avenue station =

South Shore Line station in Indiana

Carroll Ave.
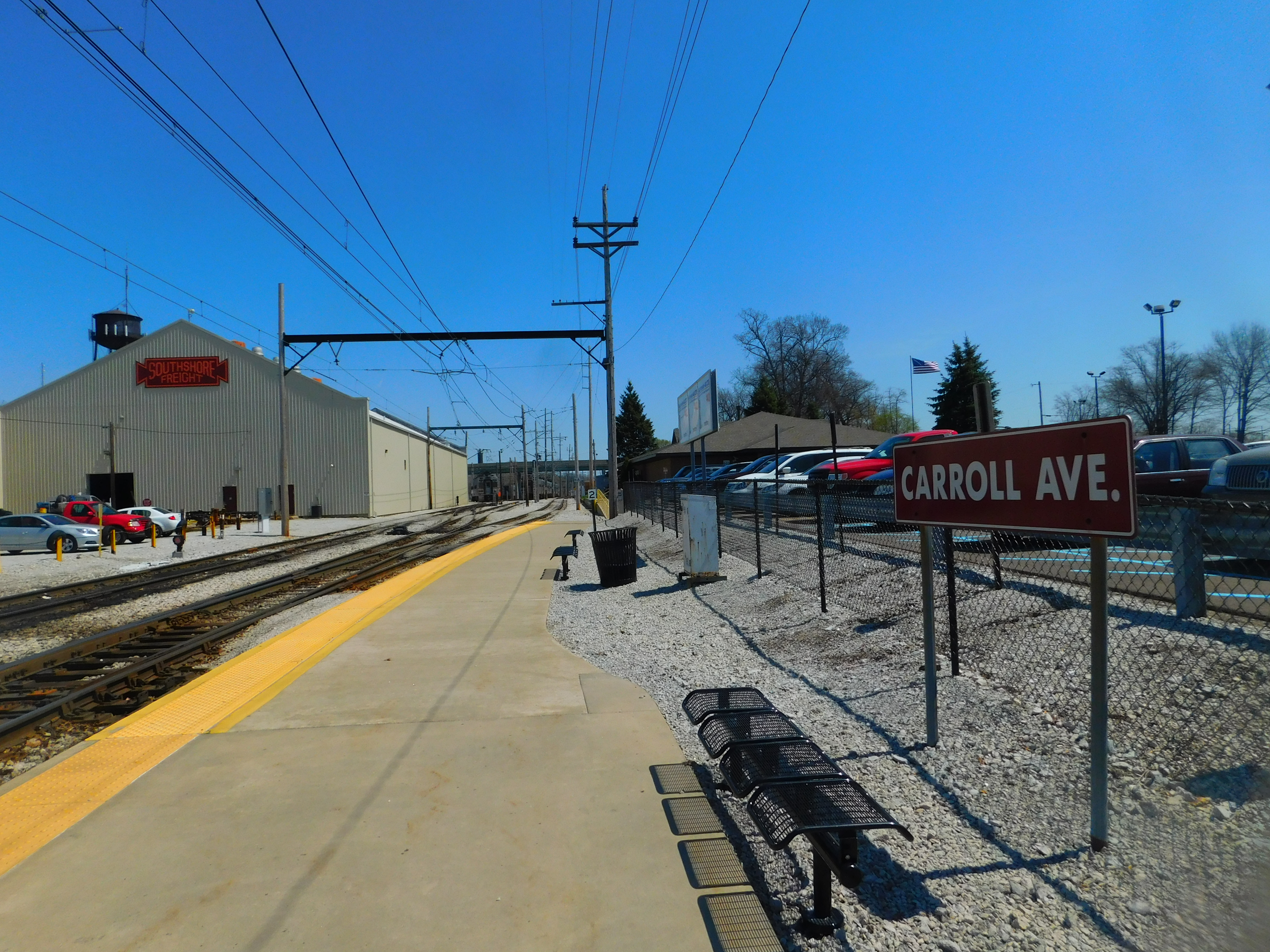
- Carroll Avenue in April 2016. The freight house and yard are visible at left.

General information
- Location: 503 North Carroll Avenue; Michigan City, Indiana, USA
- Coordinates: 41°42′48″N 86°52′4″W
- Owner: NICTD
- Platforms: 1 side platform
- Tracks: 1
- Connections: Michigan City Transit

Construction
- Accessible: Yes

Other information
- Fare zone: 8

Passengers
- 2019: 172 (average weekday)

Services
Preceding station	NICTD	Following station
11th Street toward Millennium Station	Lakeshore Corridor	Hudson Lake toward South Bend International Airport
Former services
Preceding station	NICTD	Following station
11th Street toward Randolph Street	South Shore Line	LaLumiere Closed 1994 toward South Bend
Track layout
Location

Carroll Avenue is a railway station in Michigan City, Indiana, serving the South Shore Line commuter rail line.

Although Carroll Avenue is not the eastern terminus of the South Shore Line, most trains terminate or start at this station. The coach yard is located here, as well as NICTD's headquarters.

In June 2009, NICTD officials announced their intention to close this station, on an unspecified future date, as part of their plan to revamp the street-running section of the line on 10th and 11th streets within Michigan City. However, when the new alignment was completed in May 2024, the station was not closed as originally planned. However, as a result of the track realignment and switch reconfiguration, Carroll Avenue is now only used as a terminus and origin point; all through trains between Chicago and South Bend bypass the station (but most stop downtown at 11th Street). All service to Chicago from Carroll Avenue originates at the station, and the only service to/from South Bend are the small handful of in-service equipment moves (essentially a deadhead move open to passengers) between the train yard and South Bend Airport, generally in the late evening and early morning hours. For many years (prior work to remove street-running in the city), the station was Michigan City's primary station, as 11th Street station did not offer car parking until after its reconstruction.

== Bus connections ==
Michigan City Transit

- Route 3
