= Hudson Lake station =

South Shore Line Interurban station in Indiana

Hudson Lake
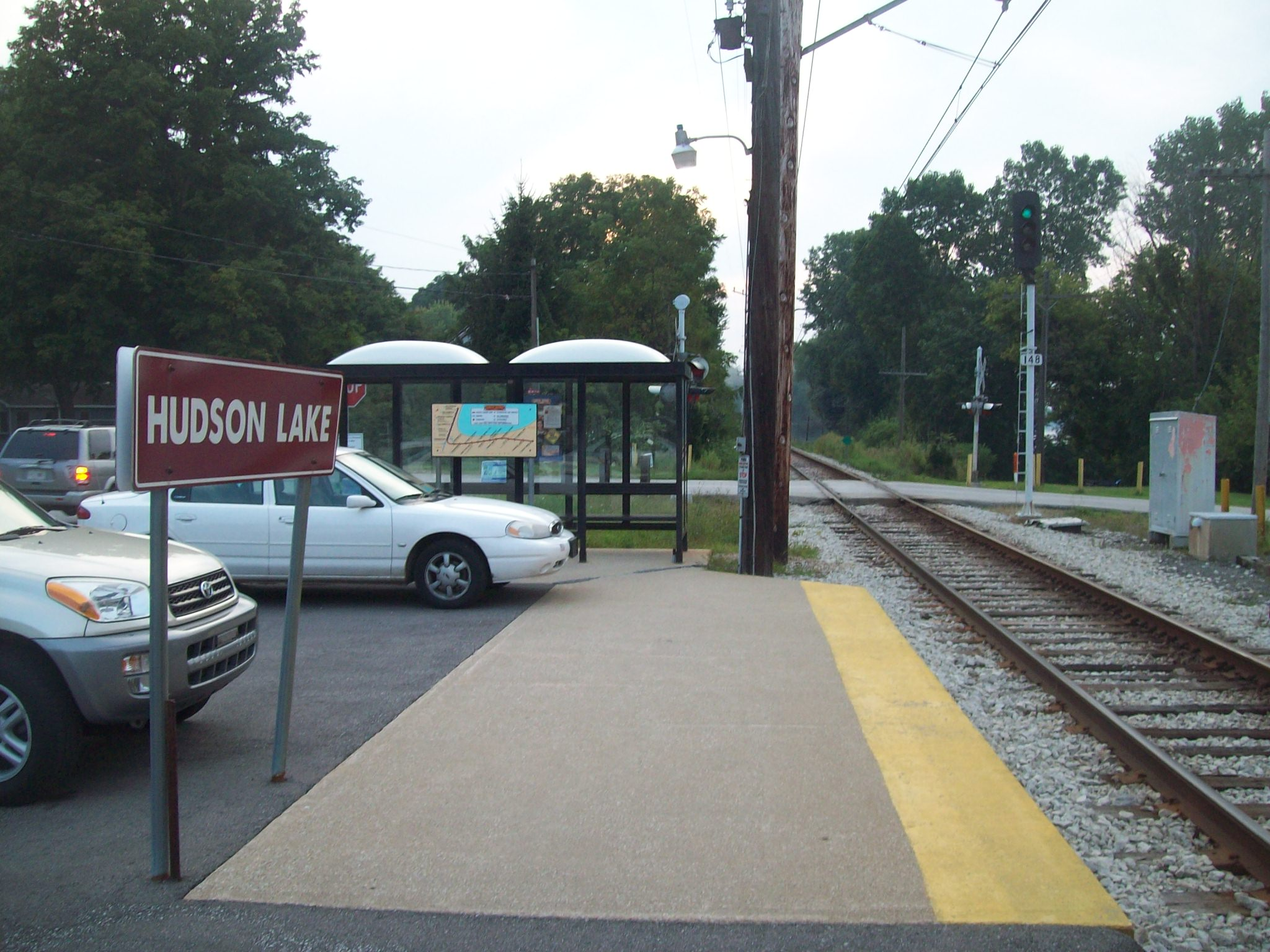
- Hudson Lake station facing west

General information
- Location: County Road 700N and Chicago Road, Hudson Lake, Indiana
- Coordinates: 41°42′34″N 86°32′15″W
- Owner: NICTD
- Platforms: 1 side platform
- Tracks: 1

Construction
- Structure type: At-grade

Other information
- Fare zone: 10

Passengers
- 2019: 1 (average weekday)

Services
Preceding station	NICTD	Following station
Carroll Avenue toward Millennium Station	Lakeshore Corridor	South Bend Airport Terminus
Former services
Preceding station	NICTD	Following station
Rolling Prairie Closed 1994 toward Randolph Street	South Shore Line	New Carlisle Closed 1994 toward South Bend
Track layout
Location

Hudson Lake is a train stop operated by the South Shore Line in the unincorporated community of Hudson Lake, Indiana. It is one of a very few interurban stations located in a rural region of the United States, being located approximately halfway between the much larger communities of Michigan City and South Bend. The station is composed of a passenger shelter, a sign, a small concrete pad, and a small parking lot. As of 2021, the Hudson Lake station is a flag stop. A customer seeking to board the train here must push a button to activate a flashing strobe light that will catch the attention of the train engineer.

Like most interurban railroads of the early 20th century, the Chicago, South Shore and South Bend Railroad was designed to string together farm communities with nearby cities. Most of these interurban railroads have ended this type of service, and the Hudson Lake station is one of the few such stations that remain. It persisted through the 1920s and 1930s as a stopping point to allow vacationers to reach the nearby lake, resorts, a casino, and dance venues.

The Hudson Lake station has a passenger shelter and parking lots on both sides of the tracks (though only the one closest to the station, a small free lot, belongs to the Northern Indiana Commuter Transportation District). The station has the shortest platform in the entire South Shore Line, as it is only long enough to berth one train car.

There has been consideration towards building a new New Carlisle station. If built, the station would replace Hudson Lake.
