= Andrews University Airpark =

Airport in Michigan, United States

Coordinates: 41°57′N 86°22′W

- IATA: none; ICAO: none; FAA LID: C20

Summary
- Owner/Operator: Andrews University
- Serves: Berrien Springs, Michigan
- Time zone: UTC−05:00 (-5)
  - Summer (DST): UTC−04:00 (-4)
- Elevation AMSL: 674 ft (205 m)
- Interactive map of Andrews University Airpark

Runways
Direction	Length		Surface
Direction	ft	m	Surface
13/31	4,148	1,264	Asphalt

Statistics (2019)
- Aircraft movements: 7300

Andrews University Airpark (FAA LID: C20) is a privately owned, public use airport located 2 miles west of Berrien Springs, Michigan, United States. It is owned and managed by Andrews University, a Seventh Day Adventist university that manages an aviation department.

The airport is home to the aviation department of Andrews University, which trains pilots under FAR Part 141. It trains pilots to be private and commercial pilots and includes additional ratings such as the instrument and multi-engine add-ons and flight instructor training.

The airport is near airports with commercial service, most notably South Bend International Airport. It is also near Southwest Michigan Regional Airport, which has historically seen airline service but, as of February 2023, has no scheduled airline service.

The airport was the starting point for an attempt to fly through all 48 contiguous states in the United States. A team of Bowling Green State University alums started at the airport while trying to fly through each state in under 48 hours.

== Facilities and aircraft ==
The airport has two runways. Runway 13/31 measures 4148 x 70 ft (1264 x 21 m) and is paved with asphalt. Runway 3/21 is a turf runway measuring 2298 x 180 ft (700 x 55 m).

The aircraft has a fixed-base operator, also operated by the university, that offers avgas as well as amenities such as flight training, aircraft maintenance and rental, and restrooms.

For the 12-month period ending September 12, 2019, the airport had 7300 aircraft operations per year, an average of 20 per day. It was composed entirely of general aviation. For the same time period, there were 31 aircraft based on the field, all airplanes: 30 single-engine and 1 multi-engine.

== Accidents and incidents ==
- On February 1, 2004, a Cessna 172RG Cutlass RG sustained substantial damage during a hard landing at Andrews University Airpark following a simulated loss of engine power during takeoff and subsequent emergency landing after takeoff. The pilots reported they had made a soft field takeoff and simulated an engine failure immediately at rotation, so the pilots pushed the nose over but developed a high sink rate due to their insufficient airspeed, subsequently making a hard landing. The probable cause was found to be the pilot's failure to maintain airspeed, leading to an excessive sink rate during a simulated emergency landing after takeoff.
- On April 13, 2006, an amateur-built Lee SQ2000 airplane was substantially damaged during landing at Andrews University Airpark. The pilot said that, during the rollout after landing, the airplane felt "rubbery" and "vibrated or appeared to hop." He lost control of the airplane, and it subsequently departed the right side of the runway. The probable cause was found to be the failure of the right main landing gear assembly during landing and the pilot's subsequent inability to maintain directional control of the airplane.
- On September 6, 2010, a Piper PA-28 operated by Andrews University for pilot training crashed at the University Airpark. The two occupants were uninjured. A pilot reported that the aircraft was practicing a steep spiral to a simulated emergency landing, but the aircraft came in at the wrong airspeed, causing a hard landing that subsequently caused a landing gear to collapse.
- On November 28, 2014, a Piper PA-24 sustained substantial damage following a total loss of engine power en route to Andrews University Airpark. The pilot had calculated there was 90 minutes of fuel on board for the 70 minute flight. The pilot reported that he had encountered weather as he approached his intended destination and decided to circle until the weather cleared. When the weather cleared, he lined up on final approach for the runway. The pilot stated that, approximately 4 miles from the runway, he encountered a total loss of engine power when the airplane ran out of fuel. During the subsequent forced landing, the airplane impacted trees and terrain, causing substantial damage to the airplane's fuselage and wings. The probable cause was found to be the pilot's inadequate fuel planning, which resulted in a total loss of engine power due to fuel exhaustion.
- On December 6, 2014, a Cessna 152 nosed over during its landing roll after landing at Andrews University. The aircraft landed on the grass runway, overran the end, and crossed over the paved intersecting runway. The airplane then continued to travel 60 feet, where it struck an embankment, and another 30 feet before nosing over and substantially damaging the firewall. The pilot stated that a gust of wind caused him to lose directional control of the airplane before it nosed over. The probable cause was found to be the pilot's failure to maintain aircraft control during the landing and his poor decision not to abort the landing before the airplane traveled off the end of the airstrip.

== See also ==
- List of airports in Michigan
