= Dune Park station =

South Shore Line station in Indiana

Dune Park
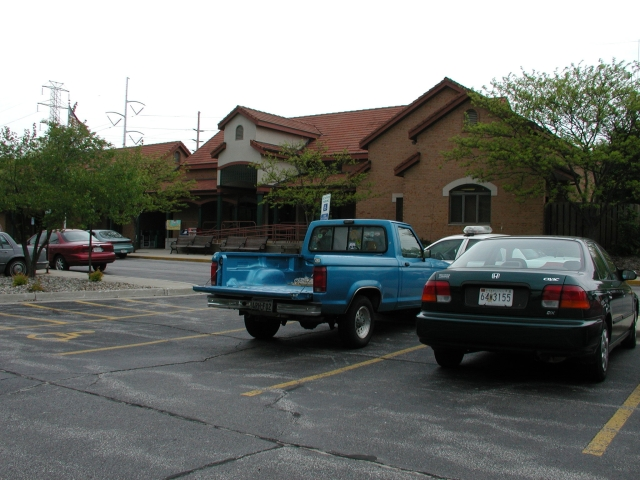
- Dune Park in May 2005.

General information
- Location: 33 East U.S. Highway 12; Chesterton, Indiana
- Coordinates: 41°38′41″N 87°3′39″W
- Owner: NICTD
- Platforms: 2 side platforms (one low-level, one high-level)
- Tracks: 2
- Connections: V-Line

Construction
- Parking: Yes; free for passengers
- Cycle facilities: Yes; bike rack
- Accessible: Yes

Other information
- Fare zone: 6

History
- Opened: June 2, 1986

Passengers
- 2019: 474 (average weekday)

Services
Preceding station	NICTD	Following station
Portage/Ogden Dunes toward Millennium Station	Lakeshore Corridor	Beverly Shores toward South Bend International Airport
Former services
Preceding station	NICTD	Following station
Dune Acres Closed 1994 toward Randolph Street	South Shore Line	Kemil Road Closed 1994 toward South Bend Airport
Track layout
Location

Dune Park is a station in Westchester Township, Porter County, Indiana, located north of the municipalities of Chesterton and Porter. It is used by South Shore Line trains, and serves as the headquarters of the Northern Indiana Commuter Transportation District (NICTD), the umbrella agency that operates the South Shore Line. It is located at the intersection of U.S. Highway 12 and Indiana State Road 49.

== Usage ==
Dune Park is a comparatively new station, built in 1985 to serve as a regional commuter station and as NICTD's corporate headquarters. The station was designed to replace the South Shore's former nearby station at Tremont, Indiana, a location that was becoming depopulated with the expansion of the nearby Indiana Dunes National Lakeshore (now Indiana Dunes National Park).

The Dune Park station was built with substantial parking space to consolidate local commuter service, and in 1994 the South Shore Line ceased to offer its traditional flag stop service to Dune Acres and Kemil Road, several miles west and east of Dune Park respectively. Users of these low-volume stops were instructed to instead use the consolidated Dune Park station.

"Dune Park" is so called because the station is physically surrounded by land owned by the Indiana Dunes National Park. Major units of the National Park are accessible from the station on U.S. 12 and the Calumet Trail. The station is also adjacent to the Indiana Dunes State Park, which is accessible to the north via Indiana 49.

Dune Park was also the name of a former section of the Indiana Dunes, between Ogden Dunes, Indiana and Dune Acres, that was physically leveled in the 1960s to create the Port of Indiana steelmaking and industrial complex.

== Renovations ==
As part of a larger project to double track the South Shore Line between Gary and Michigan City, some improvements took place at Dune Park between 2021 and 2024. Unlike several other stations on the line which saw major improvements, the improvements at Dune Park were relatively minor since the station already had two tracks and a high-level platform. The main improvement was repurposing the northern track, which prior to the renovation only existed as a siding and to allow freight trains to pass through the station without interference from the high-level platform. The improved station added a new low-level platform adjacent to the northern track while keeping the existing high-level platform adjacent to the southern track, but also added gauntlet track to the southern track to allow freight trains to pass through the station on that track (rather than being limited to only using the northern track) without interference from the high-level platform. The new platform is accessible to passengers with disabilities using a mobile wheelchair lift but is only used occasionally, such as during service disruptions. During normal operations, all trains stop at the southern high-level platform.

== Bus connections ==
V-Line

- Orange Line (Friday–Sunday only)
