= New Carlisle station (South Shore Line) =

Former South Shore Line station in Indiana

New Carlisle

General information
- Location: Arch Street and Zigler Street, New Carlisle, Indiana 46552
- Coordinates: 41°42′30″N 86°30′29″W
- Owner: NICTD
- Platforms: 1 island platform, 1 side platform
- Tracks: 2

Other information
- Fare zone: 10

History
- Opened: c. 1908
- Closed: July 5, 1994

Former services
Preceding station	NICTD	Following station
Hudson Lake toward Randolph Street	South Shore Line	South Bend Airport Terminus
Hudson Lake toward Randolph Street	South Shore Line	South Bend Closed 1992 Terminus
Preceding station	Chicago South Shore and South Bend Railroad	Following station
Hudson Lake toward Randolph Street	South Shore Line	Lydick toward South Bend
Location

New Carlisle was a South Shore Line flag stop located at the corner of Arch and Zigler Streets in New Carlisle, Indiana. The station opened c. 1908 and was built by the Chicago, South Bend and Northern Indiana Railway whose line was immediately north of the South Shore Line. Both lines used the station until the Northern Indiana Railway abandoned its South Bend–Michigan City line leaving the South Shore as the sole occupant. The station remained in service on the South Shore Line until July 5, 1994, when it was closed as part of an NICTD service revision which also saw the closure of Ambridge, Kemil Road, Willard Avenue, LaLumiere, and Rolling Prairie.

== Future ==
In 2018, a study was commissioned by the St. Joseph County Redevelopment Commission to look at the possibility of constructing a new station in New Carlisle. The study was conducted by the South Bend engineering firm Antero Group. The study's $100,000 cost was shared by St. Joseph County and NICTD. At the time the study was commissioned, two possible locations were being considered, one on the eastern edge of New Carlisle's "downtown", and another in Olive Township to the east of town.

By January 2019, St. Joseph County began eying land occupied by a mobile home park as a potential station location. The land is located on Michigan Street in the eastern side of New Carlisle, near the city's American Legion post and on the northern side of the South Shore Line tracks. A 2–1 vote by the St. Joseph County Board of approved $8,300 in contracts for the two parcels occupied by the mobile home park to be appraised by firms. By January 2020, it was announced that St. Joseph County was purchasing the 2.67 acre pair of parcels occupied by the now-vacant mobile home park for more than $400,000, with the stated prospect of locating a future South Shore Line station there. By July 2020, the county began leveling the structures on the site. There is a possibility, however, that the land might be used for a purpose other than housing a South Shore Line station.

A station in New Carlisle would likely supplant the existing Hudson Lake station. Plans to build a station in New Carlisle have been related to a proposed industrial complex that would be situated to the east of New Carlisle, which could be served by the station. The industrial complex is a project that had attracted controversy. It was additional hoped that a new station could attract businesses to the area. A representative of the NICTD board stated in July 2020 that a new station in New Carlisle could take five or more years to materialize, if ultimately pursued at all.

In 2024, NICTD president Michael Noland shared that construction of a station in the New Carlisle area was again being examined. He shared that a study conducted years earlier had concluded that, under the conditions of the area at the time of the study, a new station would not have attracted sufficient ridership. He publicized, however, that a new station was once again being explored in light of new factories and data centers being built in New Carlisle, which are expected to have many employees who will commute from out-of-town. A station in New Carlisle could serve as a means for residents of northwestern Indiana to commute to thousands of new jobs expected to be available at these facilities. Noland noted that unlike earlier proposals to locate a station within the center of New Carlisle, the most likely site for a new station would be nearer to the existing Hudson Lake flag stop. Noland expected that two years of studies and preliminary work would be required before construction could begin. However, a feasibility study released in March 2025 favored a location near the American Legion Post, approximately ten minute's walk from the Downtown New Carlisle business district. The feasibility study recommended creating a pedestrian underpass beneath the tracks. In September 2025, St. Joseph County Redevelopment Commission members confirmed that plans for a new station at a site near the American Legion post were progressing. It was also confirmed that, if built, the station will replace the Hudson Lake stop. The commission voted to approve several construction projects to ready the site for a station. Plans are to potentially open a new station in 2027 or 2028.
