= Rolling Prairie station =

Former South Shore Line station in Indiana

Rolling Prairie

General information
- Location: County Road 500 East, Birchim, Indiana 46371
- Coordinates: 41°43′00″N 86°36′11″W
- Owner: NICTD
- Platforms: 1 side platform
- Tracks: 2

Other information
- Fare zone: 10

History
- Closed: July 5, 1994
- Former names: Birchim

Services
Preceding station	NICTD	Following station
LaLumiere toward Randolph Street	South Shore Line	Hudson Lake toward South Bend
Location

Rolling Prairie was a South Shore Line flag stop located at County Road 500 East which served the communities of Rolling Prairie and Birchim in LaPorte County, Indiana. The station opened prior to 1910, and closed on July 5, 1994, as part of an NICTD service revision which also saw the closure of Ambridge, Kemil Road, Willard Avenue, LaLumiere, and New Carlisle.
