= LaLumiere station =

Former South Shore Line station in Indiana

LaLumiere

General information
- Location: Wilhelm Road, Springfield Township, Indiana 46350
- Coordinates: 41°43′03″N 86°42′15″W
- Owner: NICTD
- Tracks: 1

Other information
- Fare zone: 9

History
- Closed: July 5, 1994
- Former names: Wilhelm

Services
Preceding station	NICTD	Following station
Carroll Avenue toward Randolph Street	South Shore Line	Rolling Prairie toward South Bend
Location

LaLumiere was a South Shore Line flag stop located at Wilhelm Road in LaPorte County, Indiana. The station opened prior to 1910 and closed on July 5, 1994, as part of an NICTD service revision which also saw the closure of Ambridge, Kemil Road, Willard Avenue, Rolling Prairie, and New Carlisle. The station opened as Wilhelm after Wilhelm Road. It was later renamed to LaLumiere after LaLumiere School, a boarding school nearby.
