= Willard Avenue station =

Former South Shore Line station in Indiana

Willard Avenue

General information
- Location: Willard Avenue and 10th Street, Michigan City, Indiana 46360
- Coordinates: 41°42′29″N 86°54′48″W
- Owner: NICTD
- Tracks: 1

Other information
- Fare zone: 8

History
- Closed: July 5, 1994
- Electrified: 1500v DC

Services
Preceding station	NICTD	Following station
Beverly Shores toward Randolph Street	Lakeshore Corridor	11th Street toward South Bend International Airport
Location

Willard Avenue was a South Shore Line flag stop located at the corner of Willard Avenue and 10th Street in Michigan City, Indiana. The station opened prior to 1937 and closed on July 5, 1994, as part of an NICTD service revision which also saw the closure of Ambridge, Kemil Road, LaLumiere, Rolling Prairie, and New Carlisle.
