= South Shore Line =

Commuter rail system in Indiana and Illinois

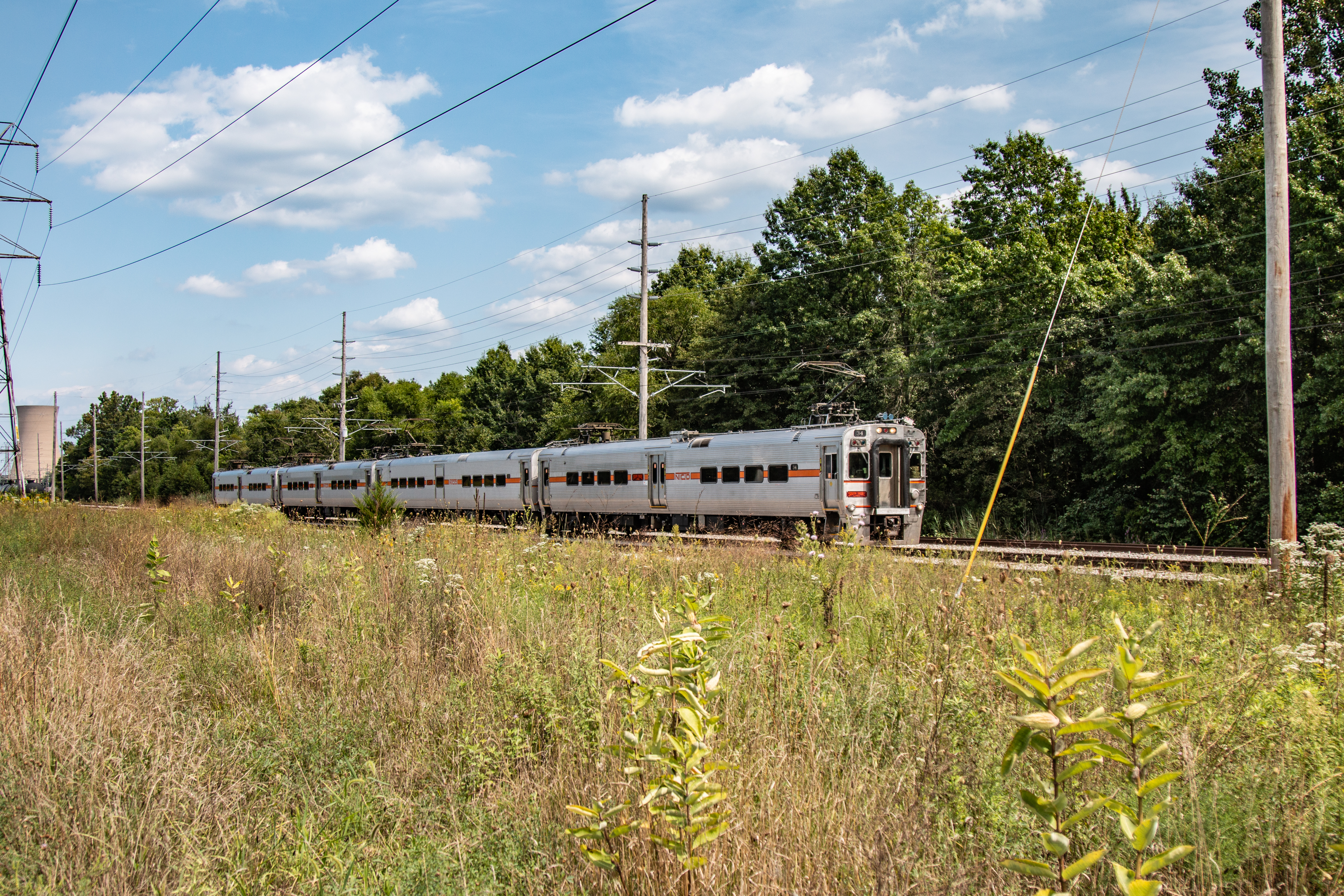
- A Lakeshore Corridor train west of Michigan City, Indiana

Overview
- Locale: Chicago, Illinois, to Dyer and South Bend, Indiana
- Transit type: Commuter rail
- Number of lines: 2
- Number of stations: 21
- Daily ridership: 7,100 (weekdays, Q2 2026)
- Annual ridership: 2,029,900 (2025)
- Website: mysouthshoreline.com

Operation
- Began operation: 1903
- Operator: Northern Indiana Commuter Transportation District

Technical
- System length: 99 miles (159 km)
- Track gauge: 4 ft 8 1/2 in (1,435 mm) standard gauge
- Electrification: Overhead line, 1,500 V DC
System map
Key

The South Shore Line (reporting mark NICD) is a commuter rail system operated by the Northern Indiana Commuter Transportation District (NICTD) between Millennium Station in downtown Chicago, Illinois, and Northwest Indiana, United States. The system consists of two service lines: the Lakeshore Corridor and the Monon Corridor. It primarily serves the Indiana portion of the Chicago metropolitan area.

The initial line was built in 1901–1908 by predecessors of the Chicago South Shore and South Bend Railroad, which continues to operate freight service. Passenger operation was assumed by the NICTD in 1989, who also purchased the track in 1990. The South Shore Line is one of the last surviving interurban railroads in the United States. In 2025, the system had a ridership of 2,029,900, or about 7,100 per weekday as of the second quarter of 2026.

== History ==
=== Private operation ===
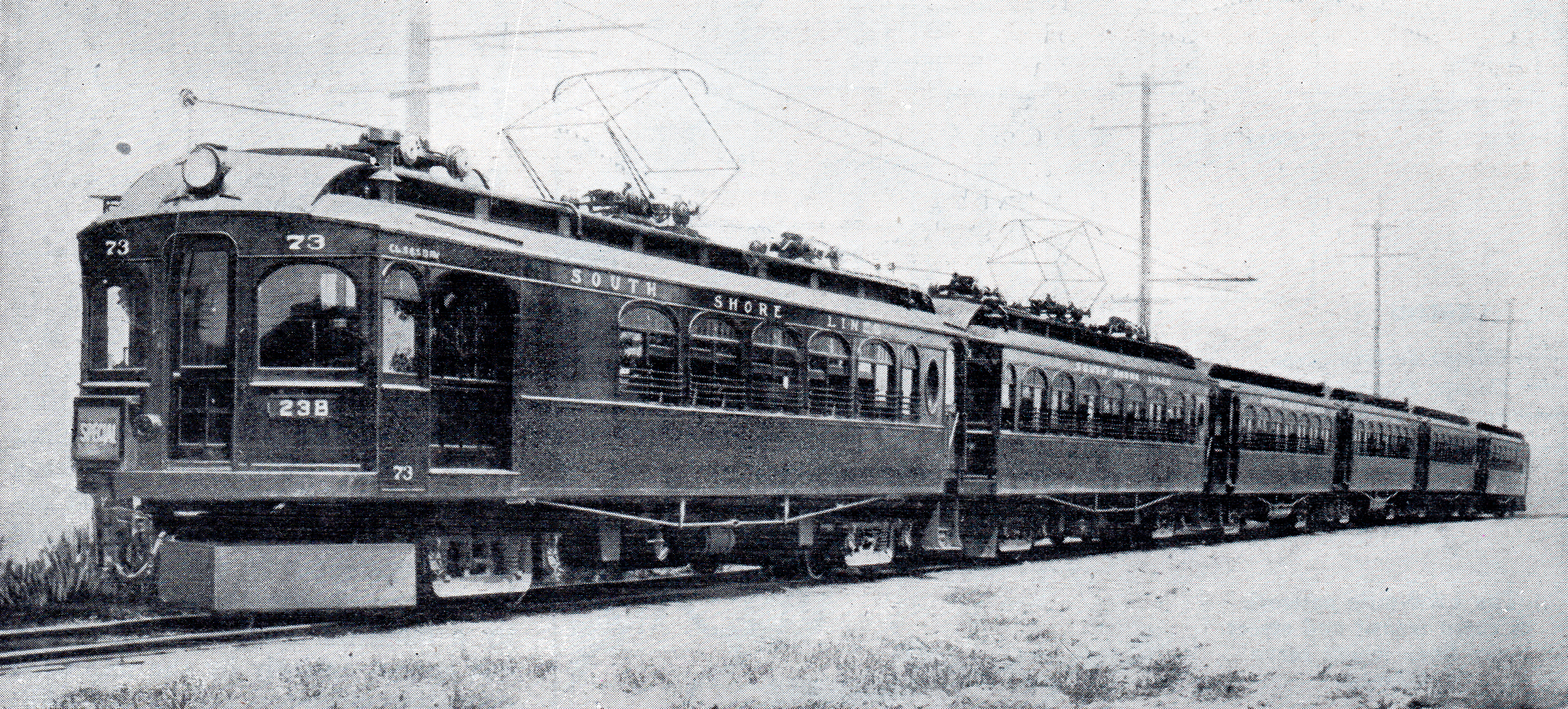
A Chicago, Lake Shore & South Bend limited train near the Indiana Dunes in the 1920s

The South Shore Line was constructed between 1901 and 1908 by the Chicago and Indiana Air Line Railway (reorganized as the Chicago, Lake Shore and South Bend Railway [CLS&SB] in 1904). Revenue service between Michigan City and South Bend began on July 1, 1908. The CLS&SB leased the Kensington and Eastern Railroad on April 4, 1909, giving it access to Chicago. That year the full line to Kensington on the Illinois Central was completed, and beginning on June 2, 1912, the electric cars were coupled to IC steam locomotives and run to downtown Chicago.

1925 broadside advertising the South Shore Line railroad between South Bend, Indiana and Chicago, Illinois to highlight attractions on the line, such as the beaches at Dunes State Park.

The Chicago, Lake Shore and South Bend entered bankruptcy in 1925 and was bought by Samuel Insull's Chicago South Shore and South Bend Railroad (CSS&SB). The line continued to handle both freight and passengers. Under Insull, the CSS&SB embarked on a major rehabilitation program. This included new ballast and ties, 100-pound (45 kg) rail in place of 70-pound (32 kg) rail, brush clearance, and an overhaul of the line's block signals. In 1949, the company acquired three Little Joe electric locomotives for freight service. These locomotives had originally been constructed for the Soviet Union, but changing attitudes due to the Cold War prevented them from being delivered. Although the exact same type as the Milwaukee Joes, the South Shore bought them before the Milwaukee did. These locomotives continued in freight service on the CSS&SB until 1983. No. 803, is preserved in operating condition at the Illinois Railway Museum.

The power system was changed from 6600 volts AC to 1500 volts DC on July 28, 1926, allowing trains to operate directly to the Illinois Central Railroad's Randolph Street Terminal (now Millennium Station) without an engine change. Trains began running to Randolph Street on August 29. That same year, the original line between East Chicago and Indiana Harbor was abandoned.

The Chicago South Shore and South Bend turned a profit during World War II due to the industrial nature of Northern Indiana. However, highway competition and suburban growth led to ridership declines. By the 1950s all interurban lines were seeing a decline in rail travel as automobile use increased. On September 16, 1956, a street running section in East Chicago was removed with the building of a new alignment alongside the Indiana Toll Road. A truncation to west of downtown South Bend removed street trackage in that city from July 1, 1970.

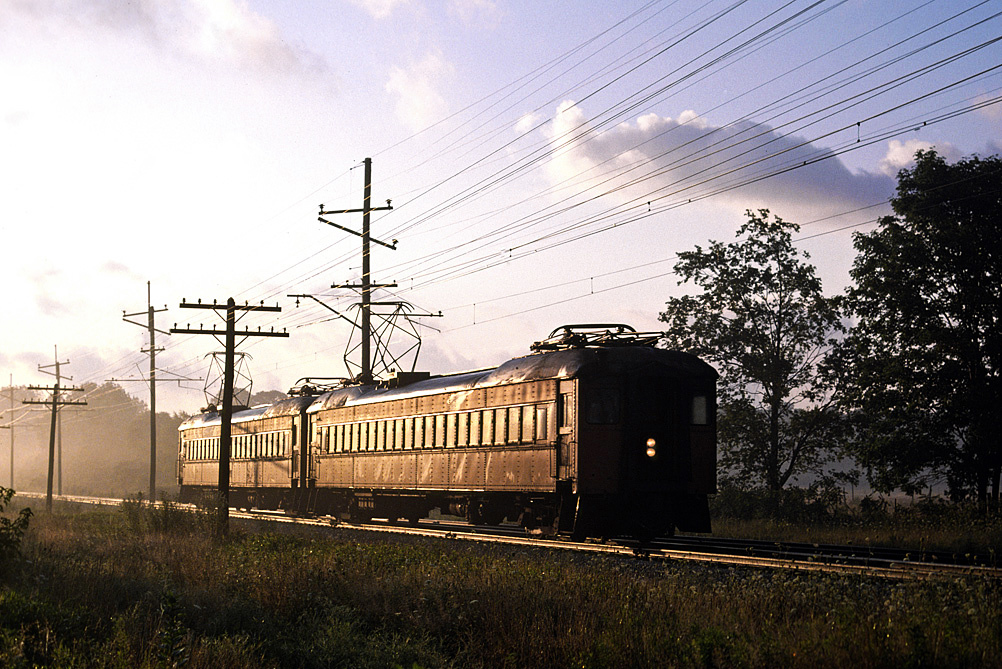
A Pullman Company electric interurban unit heading west toward Michigan City in 1980.

The Chesapeake and Ohio Railway acquired the CSS&SB on January 3, 1967, and continued the operation of passenger services. The Chicago South Shore and South Bend was one of six railroads with long-distance passenger services to decline joining Amtrak in 1971 and in 1976, they asked the Interstate Commerce Commission (ICC) to abandon passenger service. The ICC gave the state of Indiana a chance to reply and subsequently, the Northern Indiana Commuter Transportation District (NICTD) was formed in 1977 to subsidize service.

=== Public operation ===
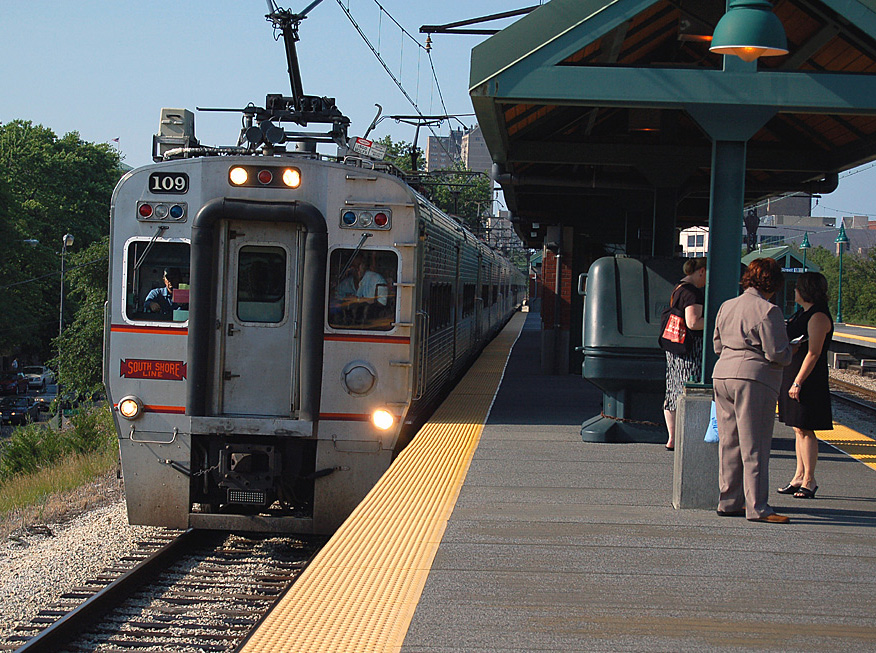
Southbound NICTD South Shore train, led by car No. 109, seen entering 57th Street station in Hyde Park, Chicago

In the late 1980s, the Chicago South Shore and South Bend went bankrupt and on December 29, 1989, passenger service was assumed by NICTD. In December 1990, the track was sold to NICTD and freight service was taken over by the new Chicago South Shore and South Bend Railroad, a subsidiary of short line operator Anacostia & Pacific. On November 21, 1992, the line's South Bend terminus moved from the Amtrak station to the airport. On July 5, 1994, NICTD closed the Ambridge, Kemil Road, Willard Avenue, LaLumiere, Rolling Prairie, and New Carlisle flag stops. A seventh station, Dune Acres, closed around the same time once parking was expanded at nearby Dune Park. The railroad began a 3-year project in 2009 to replace all catenary on its line between Michigan City and Gary, some of which was nearly 90 years old. The project cost $18 million and caused service disruptions on weekends while new wires were strung.

The Chicago Region Environmental and Transportation Efficiency Program (CREATE), replaced a bridge on the South Shore Line across 130th Street, Torrence Avenue, and Norfolk Southern tracks in the Hegewisch neighborhood of Chicago as a part of a four-year project lasting from 2011 to 2015. The 2,350-ton bridge would be put in place in August 2012.

In 2015 NICTD began an express service between South Bend and Chicago. Targeted at business travelers, the train makes just two intermediate stops: Dune Park and East Chicago. The total scheduled travel time is 1 hour 55 minutes, more than thirty minutes faster than existing services.

In July 2020 during the COVID-19 pandemic, NICTD implemented "mask optional cars" for riders choosing not to wear masks, as Indiana did not have a statewide mask mandate. This received a controversial reception at the time, as it was alleged at the time to not help slow down the spread of the coronavirus disease, and the "mask optional" car was also the only car with bike racks. On November 14, 2020, the "mask optional cars" were discontinued, requiring all passengers to wear a mask.

==== Michigan City realignment and Double Track project ====
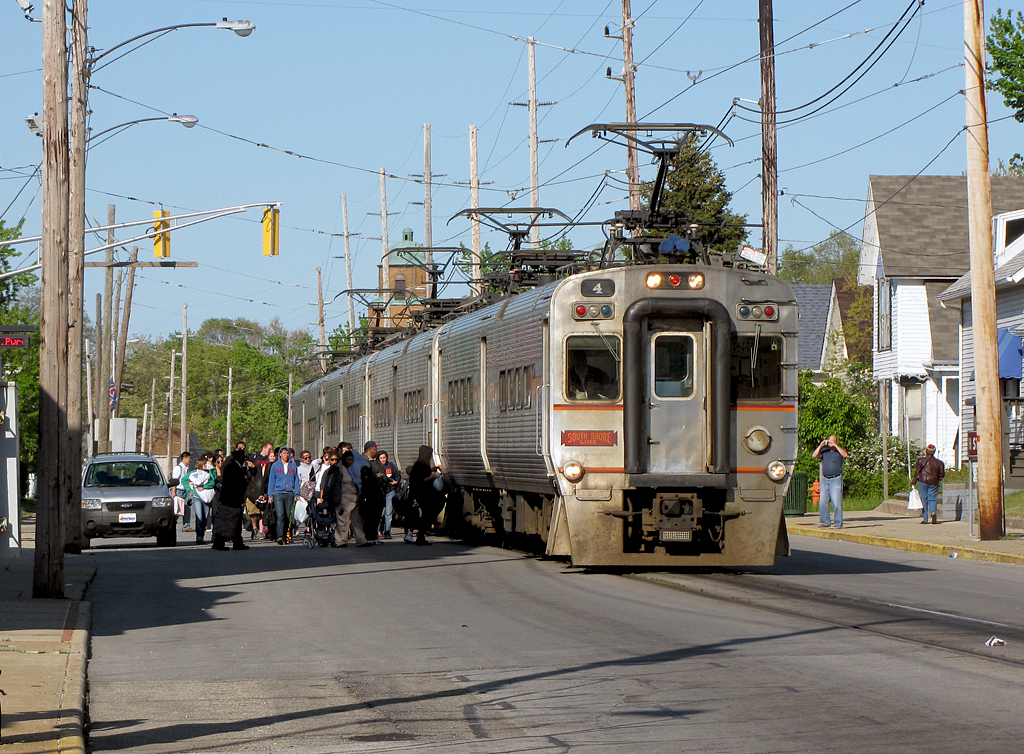
South Shore train at the 11th Street stop in Michigan City, Indiana

Since 2005, there had been an ongoing debate pertaining to plans to relocate trackage off the streets of Michigan City. In July 2009, NICTD announced its intention to relocate the Michigan City track south of its current location in order to smooth out the curves, cut down the number of grade crossings, increase speed and reduce maintenance costs. The plan also called for the replacement of both current stations with a single new station located a block west of the 11th Street boarding location (between Franklin and Washington streets) with a modern, high-level platform and parking lot. The plan would require a demolition of residential and retail buildings on the south side of 11th Street.

The relocation effort faced a setback in March 2010 when NICTD announced that it was short necessary funds to complete the preliminary engineering study. Unless the funding was found, the relocation would have been postponed indefinitely since, without the engineering study, NICTD would not be able to get state and federal funds necessary to complete the relocation. NICTD and the city continued to work on obtaining the funds needed. In 2011 NICTD accepted bids for a $1 million study, expected to take 18 months. The study was completed in October 2013. The preferred alternative identified by the study preserved an alignment similar to the current route but relocated the tracks alongside the street. It proposed replacing the two existing stations with a new station near the center of Michigan City.

As part of the Double Track Northwest Indiana project, NICTD added a second track along about 26.6 miles (42.8 km) from Gary to Michigan City during the 2020s. Work on the Double Track project commenced in 2021, and the Michigan City realignment was completed as part of the project. Street running ended on February 27, 2022, and buses temporarily replaced trains within this section. Service between Dune Park and Carroll Avenue resumed on October 25, 2023. Service on the remaining closed section between Gary and Dune Park restarted on April 9, 2024, with a new schedule taking advantage of the double track beginning on May 14. The Double Track project cost $649 million in total. Carroll Avenue station remains open despite prior plans to close it as part of the project.

==== Monon Corridor ====
NICTD planned to apply for federal funding for a preliminary engineering study and environmental survey of a Hammond-to-Lowell leg in 2009. As of 2008, that leg had a projected price tag of $551 million. As of 2019, the cost has increased to $665 million. NICTD was awarded funding in the spring of 2020 and the line broke ground in October 2020. The project was originally estimated to open to revenue service in May 2025, but ultimately began operation March 31, 2026.

The new service runs through Hammond and Munster to Dyer, with a possible later extension to St. John. Trains run as shuttles between Hammond and Dyer during off-peak hours, continuing to Millennium Station during peak hours. The alignment of the new branch leaves the old CSS&SB main immediately before the original Hammond station. Hence, the NICTD built the Hammond Gateway station to serve both branches, which opened in October 2024.

== Rolling stock ==
=== Current ===
Single-level electric multiple unit
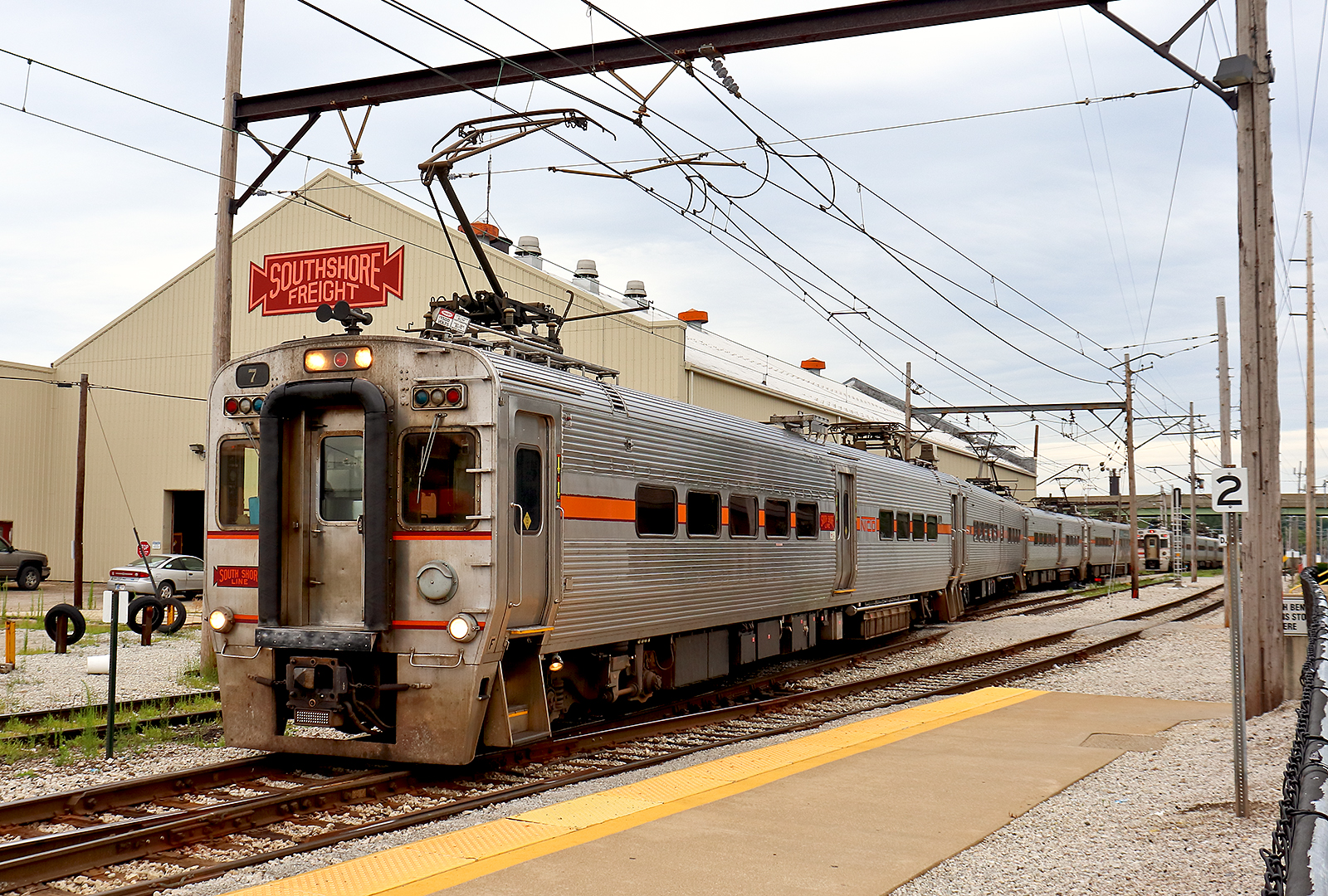
- In service: 1982–present
- Manufacturer: Nippon Sharyo
- Constructed: 1982–1983, 1992, 2001
- Number built: 68
- Formation: Married-pair
- Fleet numbers: 1–48, 201–210, 101–110
- Capacity: 93
- Operators: CSS&SB, NICTD
- Line served: South Shore Line

Specifications
- Car body construction: Stainless steel
- Car length: 85 ft (25.91 m)
- Width: 10 ft 6 in (3.20 m)
- Height: 15 ft 11 in (4.85 m)
- Wheel diameter: 36 in (914 mm)
- Wheelbase: 8 ft 2 1/2 in (2.502 m)
- Maximum speed: 79 mph (127 km/h)
- Weight: 118,000 lb (54,000 kg) (empty)
- Traction system: IGBT-VVVF (Toshiba)
- Traction motors: 3-phase AC induction motor (Toshiba)
- HVAC: Electric heating, Air conditioning
- Electric systems: Overhead line, 1,500 V DC
- Current collection: Pantograph
- UIC classification: Bo’Bo’+Bo’Bo’
- AAR wheel arrangement: B-B+B-B
- Bogies: ND-312
- Coupling system: Tomlinson
- Track gauge: 4 ft 8 1/2 in (1,435 mm) standard gauge

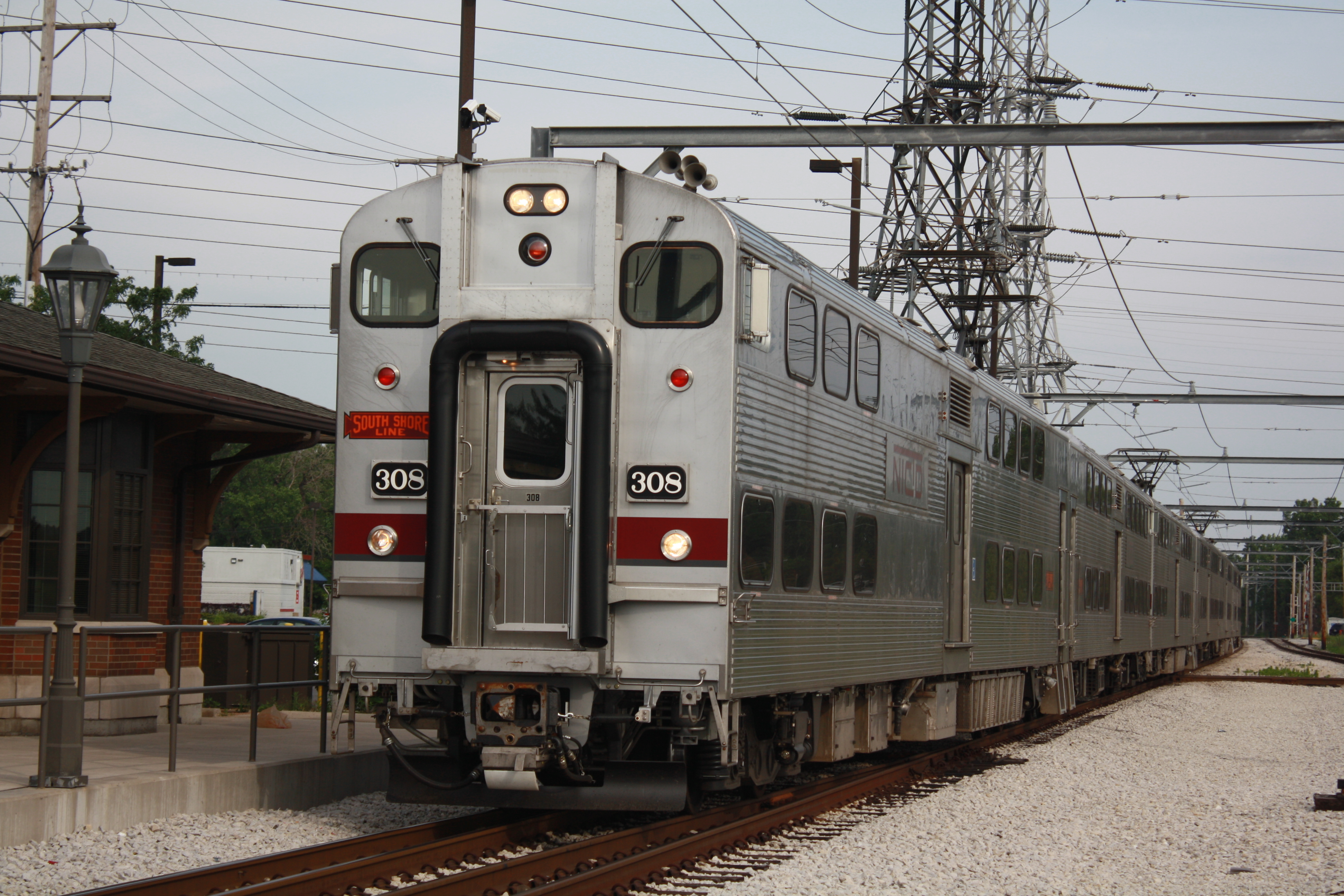
A bi-level unit in service in 2009.

The South Shore Line operates with a fleet of 82 rail cars built between 1982 and 2009 by Nippon Sharyo. The fleet consists of 58 single-level self-propelled cars, 10 single-level unpowered trailers, and 14 bilevel self-propelled cars. The single level fleet's design shares commonalities with MARC's locomotive-hauled MARC II fleet, which were also built by Nippon Sharyo. An additional 26 cars are planned to be acquired, replacing those to be transferred to Monon Corridor services. Several Highliner IIs from Metra Electric have already been acquired. As of 2026, the NICTD is still planning on ordering new cars to replace the 1982-built cars.

| Numbers | Model | Built | Builder | notes |
|---|---|---|---|---|
| 1–48 | Single-level electric multiple unit | 1982–83, 1992 | Nippon Sharyo | Engineer cab on both ends 31-38 purchased and owned by Metra under long-term lease. |
| 201–210 | Trailer | 1992 | Nippon Sharyo | |
| 101–110 | Single-level electric multiple unit | 2001 | Nippon Sharyo | Engineer cab on only one end. |
| 301–314 | Highliner II | 2009 | Nippon Sharyo | |
| 1201–1226 | Highliner II | 2005–2006 | Nippon Sharyo | Ex Metra Electric |

=== Retired ===
Pullman and the Standard Steel Car Company delivered electric multiple units to the CSS&SB between 1926 and 1929. Many were lengthened in the 1940s and 1950s.

| Numbers | Model | Built | Builder | Notes |
|---|---|---|---|---|
| 1–11 | 62-seat coach | 1908 | Niles | Two cars scrapped prior to 1923; the remainder scrapped in 1929 |
| 12–15 | 62-seat coach | 1908 | Niles | Built as trailers. Rebuilt in 1915 with motors. Baggage compartments added in 1925. Scrapped in summer of 1929. |
| 60–61 | 48-seat suburban car | 1908 | Kuhlman | 60 wrecked prior to 1918. 61 scrapped in 1927 |
| 62–63 | 48-seat suburban car | 1903 | Brill | Originally Chicago and Indiana Air Line Railway cars 1 and 2 |
| 64 | 48-seat suburban car | 1918 | Kuhlman | Built as a replacement for car 60 |
| 70–71 | 54-seat coach | 1908 | Niles | 71 rebuilt as CSS&SB 401 in 1927. 70 used as a yard office and scrapped in 1935. |
| 72–74 | 46-seat combine | 1908 | Niles | Rebuilt with larger baggage compartments. 73 wrecked in 1909 and rebuilt to work motor 1126 in 1927; undergoing restoration. 72 rebuilt to line car 1101 in 1927. 74 used as trainmen's room at South Bend and scrapped in 1941. |
| 75–77 | 54-seat coach | 1908 | Niles | Scrapped in summer of 1929 |
| 101–110 | 52-seat coach | 1908 | Kuhlman | Two cars rebuilt into CSS&SB 222 and 224 in 1927. The remainder were scrapped in 1929. |
| 111–112 | 60-seat open vestibule car | [data missing] | [data missing] | Purchased in 1917. Formerly AT&SF cars. |
| 113–114 | 56-seat open vestibule car | [data missing] | [data missing] | Purchased in 1917. Formerly AT&SF cars. |
| 1–10 | 56-seat coach smoker | 1926 | Pullman | |
| 11–15 | 80-seat coach | 1926 | Pullman | Lengthened in 1942–46 |
| 16–25 | 80-seat coach | 1927 | Pullman | Lengthened in 1945–47 |
| 26–29 | 80-seat coach | 1929 | Standard Steel | Lengthened in 1948 |
| 30–37; 39 | 48-seat coach smoker | 1929 | Standard Steel | |
| 38 | 56-seat coach | 1929 | Standard Steel | |
| 40 | 48-seat coach smoker | 1938 | Standard Steel | Rebuilt from trailer no. 213 |
| 100–109 | 64–68 seat coach–baggage | 1926 | Pullman | Lengthened in 1943–44 and modernized in 1949–50 |
| 110–111 | 64-seat coach–baggage | 1951 | Standard Steel | Rebuilt from coaches nos. 10 and 29 |
| 201–206 | 80-seat coach trailer | 1927 | Pullman | Lengthened in 1946–48 |
| 207–210 | 50-seat coach smoker trailer | 1927 | Pullman | |
| 211–212 | 50-seat coach smoker trailer | 1929 | Pullman | |
| 351–352 | 16-seat parlor–observation–buffet trailer | 1927 | | Originally 20 fixed chairs; rebuilt with 16 rotating chairs in 1929; rebuilt as coaches in 1942 |
| 353–354 | 56-seat coach trailer | 1938–39 | Standard Steel | Rebuilt from parlors built in 1929 |

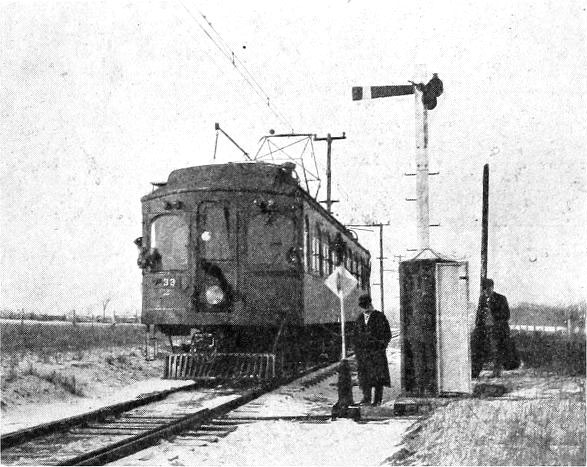
A CLS&SB wood-bodied interurban car at a siding

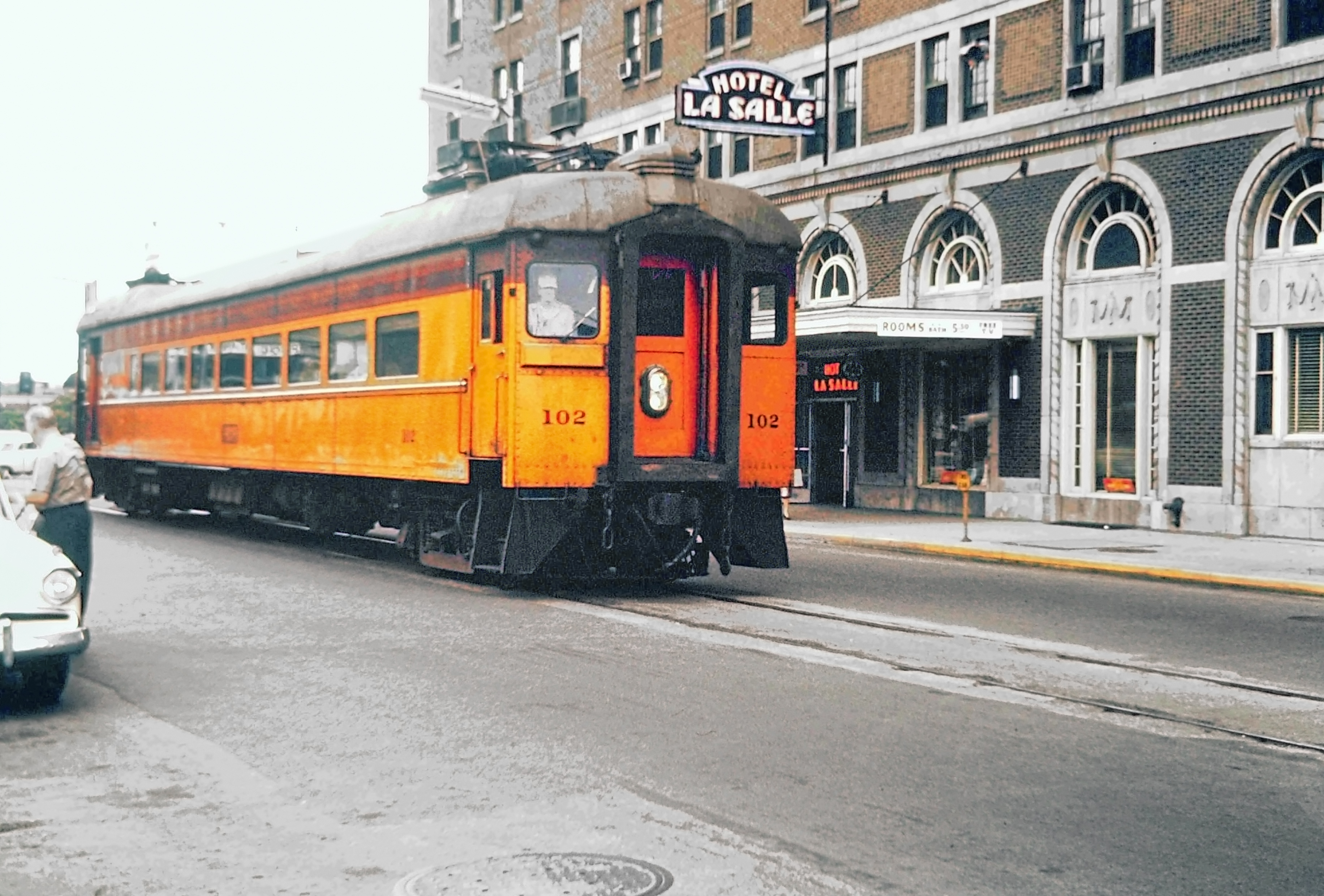
CSS&SB no. 102, built by Pullman in 1926, street-running in South Bend in 1962

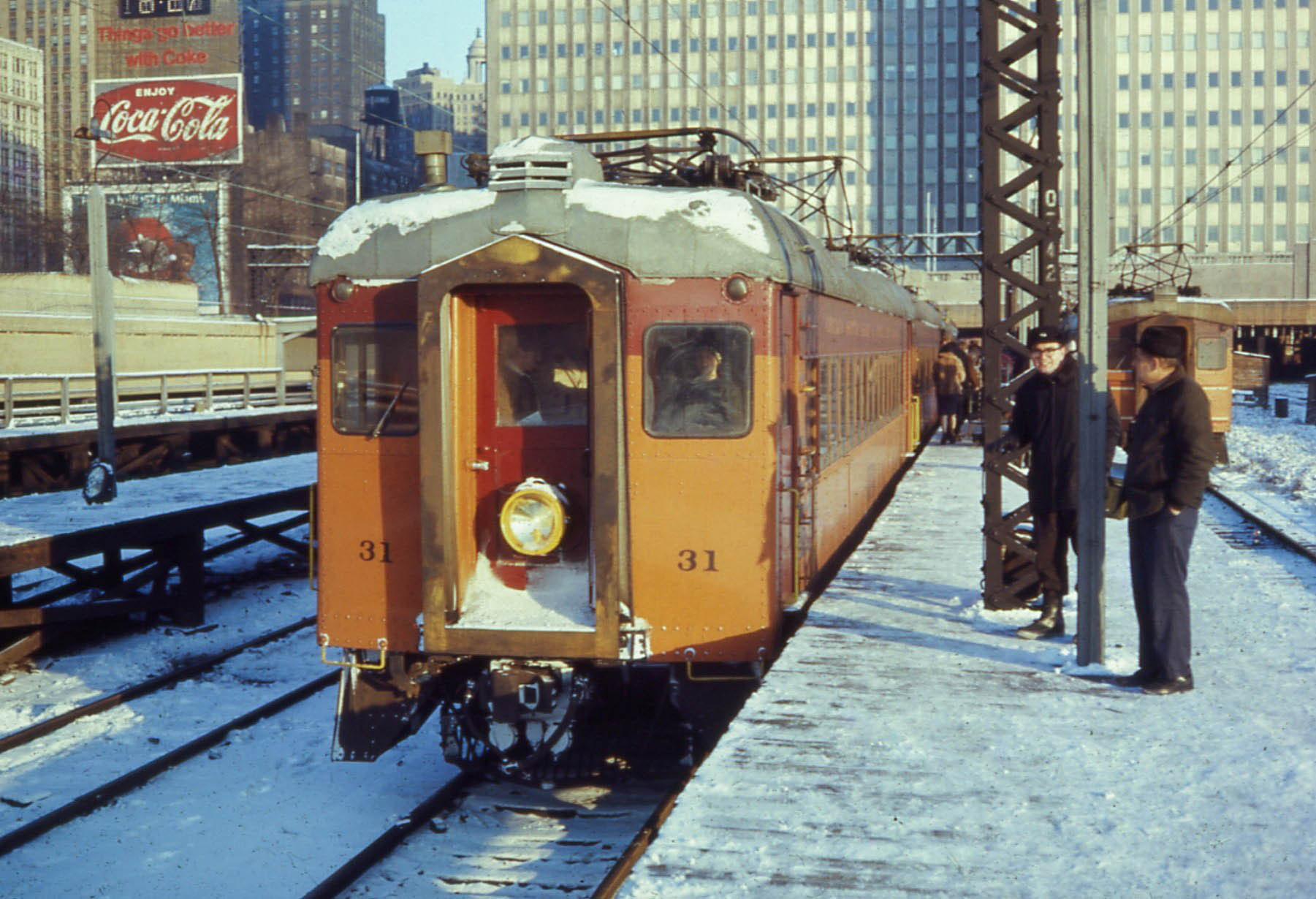
CSS&SB no. 31, built by Standard Steel Car in 1929, at Randolph Street in 1968

== Fare policies ==
The South Shore Line uses a zone-based fare system, with prices based on the distance traveled and stations' proximity to Millennium Station. There are a total of eleven zones (1–11). Tickets may be purchased at stations, online, and through the South Shore mobile app. Ticket options include one-way, 10-ride, 25-ride, and monthly passes. One-way tickets may also be purchased on trains, but will incur a $1.00 penalty fee if a ticket agent was present at the departure station. Children aged 13 years and under, seniors aged 65 and over, passengers with disabilities, students, active-duty military personnel, and those holding RTA Reduced Fare Permits are eligible for reduced fares. NICTD accepts cash aboard trains, cash and checks at ticket offices, and credit cards online and at Millennium Station's ticket office. Most stations have ticket machines which only accept credit cards. For travel to Hegewisch station (zone 3), fares are set by Metra.

== Proposed expansions and realignments ==
=== South Shore Line Airport Realignment ===
There are proposals to replace the South Bend terminus with a new station. Since 2006, plans had been made to explore relocating the station to the west end of the South Bend International Airport. Locally preferred alternatives were presented to the original proposal to relocate the station. In 2018, South Bend's mayor Pete Buttigieg ordered a study of five possible locations for a new station serving South Bend. The South Bend Redevelopment Commission commissioned a study that December to further examine the cost of a station in downtown South Bend. In 2022, NICTD's board of trustees voted to issue a request for proposals to move the station to the west side of the airport. As of 2025, NICTD is moving forward with its plans to build a new station on the airport's west side, dubbing the project the "South Shore Line Airport Realignment". However, they have not ruled out the possibility of reestablishing service to downtown South Bend in the future.

=== Valparaiso branch ===
At a legislative hearing in October 2008, NICTD officials said they would drop further study of a Munster-to-Valparaiso route, and begin study of a Gary–Valparaiso route. At the hearing, NICTD officials said the projected cost of $673 million for the Munster-to-Valparaiso route as well as low projected ridership would have made it ineligible for federal funding and opted to study the Gary-to-Valparaiso route instead. The Gary-to-Valparaiso route would utilize the partially abandoned former Pennsylvania Railroad line. NICTD officials contend the shorter length of a Gary-to-Valparaiso run and the chance to use existing tracks there may make it a lower-cost alternative to the Munster-to-Valparaiso route. A Valparaiso branch via Hobart and Wheeler was again proposed in the Northwest Indiana Regional Development Authority's 2025 strategic plan.

=== Other proposed projects ===
In addition to the Valparaiso branch, the Regional Development Authority's 2025 strategic plan proposed a new South Shore Line branch to Crown Point via Hammond, as well as a southern extension of the Monon Corridor to St. John and beyond.

Studies are underway to reestablish a station in New Carlisle to supplant Hudson Lake station.

In the 1980s and 1990s, there was some discussion about the possibility of extending the line from South Bend east to Elkhart County, Indiana. In 1988, Elkhart, Indiana Mayor James Perron pushed for the government to look into making long-term plans for an extension into his city.

In August 2026, the NICTD approved its 20-year plan, including several new routes:

- the Lowell Extension would extend the Monon Corridor from Munster/Dyer to Lowell, Indiana, with four intermediate stops.
- the Hammond Bears Stadium Corridor is a proposed branch connecting Hammond to the proposed Chicago Bears Stadium.
- the Valparaiso Extension would connect Gary/Chicago Airport to Porter Regional Airport with stations at Gary University Park, Hobart, Wheeler, and Valparaiso.
- the Laporte Extension is a branch that would start at 11th Street station, diverge from the Lakeshore Corridor at Carroll Avenue station, then go to La Porte, Indiana with a stop at U.S. Route 35 in Oakwood.
- the Downtown South Bend Shuttle would connect the Lakeshore Corridor at a new station on Pine Road with the South Bend Amtrak station and downtown South Bend.

In addition to these proposed extensions, the NICTD 20-year plan would also replace many of the South Shore Line's older cars with newer cars. Kelly Wenger, the director of strategy planning and grants for the NICTD, says that the NICTD will "have to be proactive in engineering and making a purchase essentially next year". Battery electric multiple unit are one possible option, as batteries would allow them to operate on existing tracks without the need to electrify them for the future extensions.

== Station listing ==
The South Shore Line serves passengers in Chicago and Northwest Indiana. Each station along the Lakeshore Corridor provides travel toward (inbound) and away from (outbound) downtown Chicago. Most trains along the Monon Corridor travel exclusively on its own branch line between Hammond Gateway and Munster/Dyer, while select peak hour trains continue north onto the Lakeshore Corridor towards the Chicago Loop.

The Lakeshore Corridor originates at Millennium Station, formerly and still often called Randolph Street Terminal, shared with the Metra Electric District in downtown Chicago.

Stations are located in Chicago, as well as in suburban Cook County in Illinois, and Lake, Porter, LaPorte, and St. Joseph counties in Indiana.

=== Routes ===
The South Shore Line operates two lines; the Lakeshore Corridor, which is its historical 90-mile (140 km) main line, and the Monon Corridor, a short 9-mile (14 km) branch line, which serves the Northwestern Indiana municipalities of Hammond, Munster, and Dyer.

== Accidents and incidents ==
Throughout the over 120 years of operation, several passengers have been injured or died in accidents on the South Shore Line.

On June 19, 1909, twelve people died when two trains collided head-on; one of the carriages involved in the incident was later preserved.

A collision near Gary in April 1926 caused the death of one passenger.

66 years later, another collision near Gary occurred on January 18, 1993, where a westbound train and an eastbound train collided head-on on a gauntlet track, killing seven people; the National Transportation Safety Board determined that one train's engineer passed a red light, while the engineer of the other train had failed to stop in time.

Three passengers died on June 18, 1998, when a train ran into a truck that was trapped on the tracks near a Midwest Steel factory.

On June 10, 2024, a westbound train collided with a stalled dump truck at a level crossing near Gary. Two passengers on board the train were injured and transported to a hospital by ambulance.

On June 24, 2026, a freight train derailed near East Chicago station causing severe damage to the overhead catenary system. Weekday service was reduced for more than two weeks afterwards to accommodate repair.

== See also ==
- Metra
- Proposed new South Shore Line station in South Bend
