= List of rail accidents (1990–1999) =

This is a list of rail accidents from 1990 to 1999.

== 1990 ==
- January 4 – Pakistan – Sukkur rail disaster: A Multan–Karachi Bahauddin Zakaria Express collided head-on with an empty freight train at Sangi station, Sukkur, Sindh. The train was to pass through Sangi, but incorrectly set rail points directed the train to a siding where the freight train was parked. 307 people were killed and another 700 injured in Pakistan's worst rail disaster.
- February 2 – West Germany – Rüsselsheim train disaster: Two S-Bahn commuter trains collide in Rüsselsheim, killing 17 and injuring 80.
- February 16 – Switzerland – A passenger train collided with a rail-mounted crane at Saxon, killing three people and injuring 12.
- March 7 – United States – 1990 Philadelphia subway accident: A bolt securing a traction motor on a SEPTA subway-elevated train failed, causing the train to derail. Three people were killed and 150 injured.
- May 6 – Australia – Cowan rail accident: The 3801 Limited special steam passenger train stalled while climbing a steep gradient from the Hawkesbury River to Cowan. It was then rear-ended by a CityRail inter-urban passenger train, killing six people. Sand applied to the rails interfered with track signals and gave the CityLine train a false clear indication.
- August 20 – Poland – Ursus rail crash: Passenger train Silesia – from Prague to Warsaw – telescoped the last car of a passenger train from Szklarska Poręba to Warsaw, killing 16 and injuring 43.
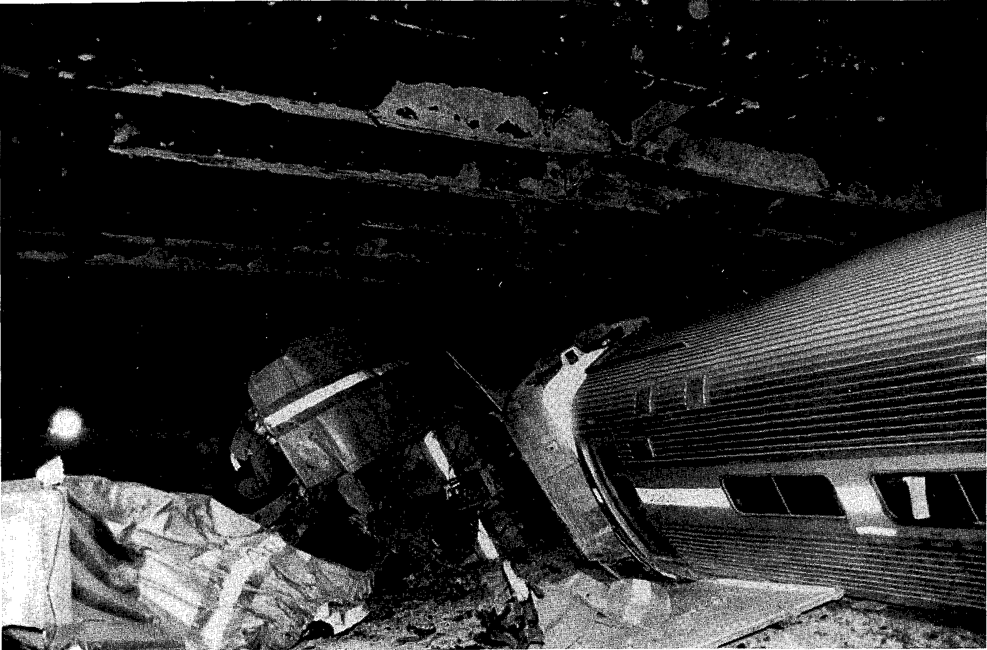
- 1990 Back Bay, Massachusetts, train collision
  December 12 – United States – Back Bay rail accident: Amtrak's Night Owl, the Northeast Corridor's overnight train, travelling at excessive speed around a curve inside a tunnel, derailed and rear-ended an MBTA commuter train in Back Bay station in Boston. 453 people were injured.
- December 20 – Taiwan – A Kaohsiung-Taipei express train collided at a level crossing at Lu Chu, Kaohsiung with a bus carrying 51 farmers which burst into flames, killing 25 people, and injuring 32.

== 1991 ==
- January 7 – Hungary – Tram No. 1342 (Ganz bendytram) operated by BKV derailed and overturned in Budapest at the corner of Vajda Péter utca and Orczy út due to an unintentional point switching by the tram driver, killing three passengers and a pedestrian.
- May 3 - Australia - In Henty, New South Wales, a New South Wales XPT train locomotive derailed due to track failures, 6 people were injured.
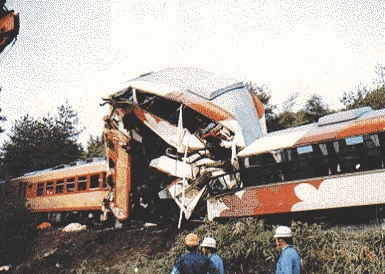
- Shigaraki train disaster
  May 14 – Japan – Shigaraki train disaster, Shigaraki, Shiga: A Shigaraki Kōgen Railway (SKR) passenger train collided head-on with a JR West passenger train after the SKR train passed a red signal, killing 42 people. A malfunctioning signal gave the JR West train a green signal, when the approaching SKR train should have turned the signal to red. Confusion among SKR staff stemming from the signal problems prompted them to send the train against a red signal.
- July 15 – United States – Dunsmuir, California – California's largest hazardous chemical spill: A 19,000-gallon (72,000 L) tank car containing the pesticide/herbicide metam sodium derailed from a Southern Pacific freight train and tumbled off the bridge over the Sacramento River at the Cantara Loop before rupturing on the rocks below, spilling the car's entire load into the river. Virtually every aquatic organism on a 40-mile (64 km) stretch of river was killed.
- July 21 – United Kingdom – Glasgow: Newton rail accident killed four and injured 22. Junction layout was cited as a contributing factor.
- July 29 – United States – Seacliff, California: A Southern Pacific freight train carrying hazardous chemicals derailed in the Ventura County coastal community of Seacliff. Four of the 14 railroad cars that derailed were carrying two types of chemicals: a half-strength aqueous hydrazine solution used to make agricultural, metal plating, plastics and photo processing chemicals; and naphthalene, an industrial solvent for making other chemicals.
- July 31 – United States – Lugoff, South Carolina: The Amtrak Silver Star derailed the rear portion of a former Seaboard Air Line of the CSXT Railroad after a faulty switch split as the train passed over it, directing a coach into a hopper car standing on a siding, and derailing equipment. Eight passengers died and 76 were injured.
- August 5 – Canada – Kinsella, Alberta: A CN intermodal train struck a truck carrying light crude oil at a marked highway crossing. The impact ignited the oil and significantly damaged the train, killing the three train crew members and the truck driver.
- August 28 – United States – New York City: 1991 Union Square derailment - Five people were killed and more than 200 injured after a #4 Lexington Avenue express train derailed over a switch just north of Union Square. Two subway cars broke open as they struck the steel tunnel support beams. The uninjured motorman, who was reported to have been handling the train erratically, was later found to be legally drunk. The accident was instrumental in imposing new federal rules for engineer certification and toxicology testing.
- September 6 – Republic of the Congo – More than 100 people were killed after a passenger train from Pointe Noire collided head-on with a goods train carrying timber from Brazzaville.
- October 16 – France – . A freight train overran a closed signal after its engineer suffered a heart attack, and fouled the path of the Nice-Paris night train at Melun, killing 16 people. The deadman mechanism worked normally but failed to stop the train in time. This led to the adoption of the KVB automatic train control system.
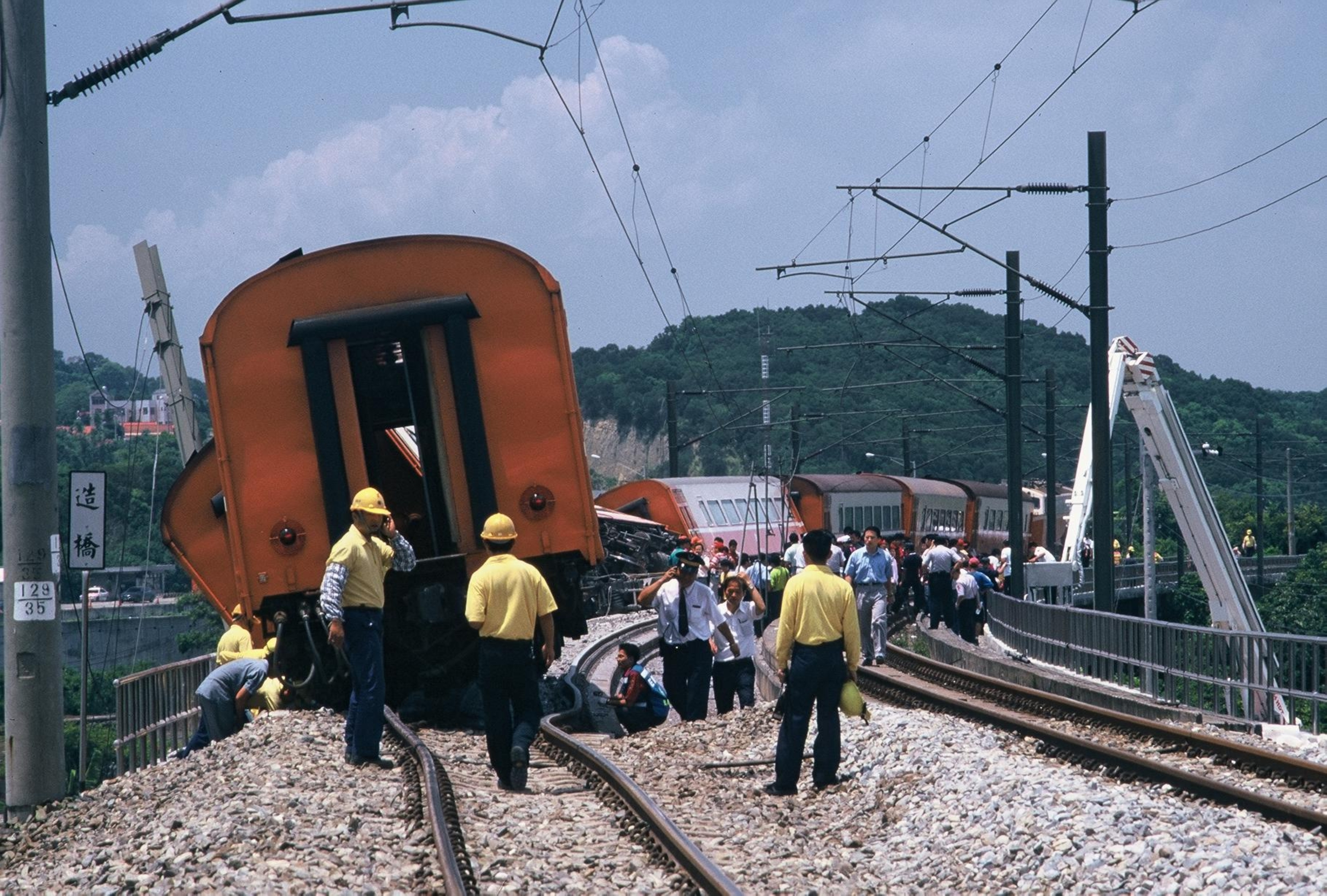
- 1991 Miaoli train collision
  November 15 – Taiwan – 1991 Miaoli train collision - A northbound Tze-Chiang Train ran over the stop signal and rear-ended a southbound Chukuang train, killing 30 people and injuring 112.
- December 7 – United Kingdom – Severn Tunnel rail accident - An InterCity 125 diesel multiple unit was rear-ended by a Class 155 Sprinter inside the Severn Tunnel, injuring 185 people.

== 1992 ==
- March 3 – Russia – Podsosenka train disaster: Yurmala passenger train No. 004 ran a red light at a restrictive signal and collided head-on with oncoming freight train No. 3455 before catching fire, killing 43 people and injuring 108.
- March 12 – Sweden – 1992 Gothenburg tram derailment: A brakeless tram rolled down a street in central Gothenburg at high speed and crashed into waiting passengers at a tram stop at Vasaplatsen, injuring 42 and killing 13 people.
- August 8 – Switzerland – A train and a tram collided at Zurich, killing one person and injuring nine.
- April 29 – United States – at Bell King Road in Newport News, Virginia, a crossing without gates or warning lights, Amtrak's Colonial passenger train collided with a dump truck, killing the truck driver and injuring 54 passengers.
- June 30 – United States– Nemadji River train derailment: near Superior, Wisconsin, a Burlington Northern freight train derailed on a trestle, spilling benzene into the Nemadji River and releasing a toxic vapor which killed wild animals and outside pets.
- August 12 – United States – Just outside Newport News, Virginia, Amtrak's Colonial passenger train, traveling at nearly 80 mph (130 km/h), entered a switch that had just moments before been opened by a pair of saboteurs, injuring dozens. The saboteurs, Coast Guardsmen Joseph Loomis and Raymond Bornman Jr., were sentenced to federal prison terms.
- October 10 - South Africa – A steam passenger train running during the Lady Grey Spring Festival derailed at high speed killing the engine driver and 5 passengers.
- October 11 – China – Liaoning, Fushun – Two locomotives of the Shenyang Railway Bureau Meihekou locomotive depot were reconnected to pull a freight train through the Shenyang-Jilin Railway on approach to Shimenling railway station and prepare to stop a passenger train from Tianjin railway station to Jilin railway station. Because one of the corner cock of the train was closed, the brake failed. To avoid a collision, the freight train derailed and overturned after entering the safety siding of Shimenling railway station, killing four locomotive attendants.
- November 15 – Germany – 11 people died and 52 were injured after the wreckage of a derailed freight train was hit by an express train near Northeim.
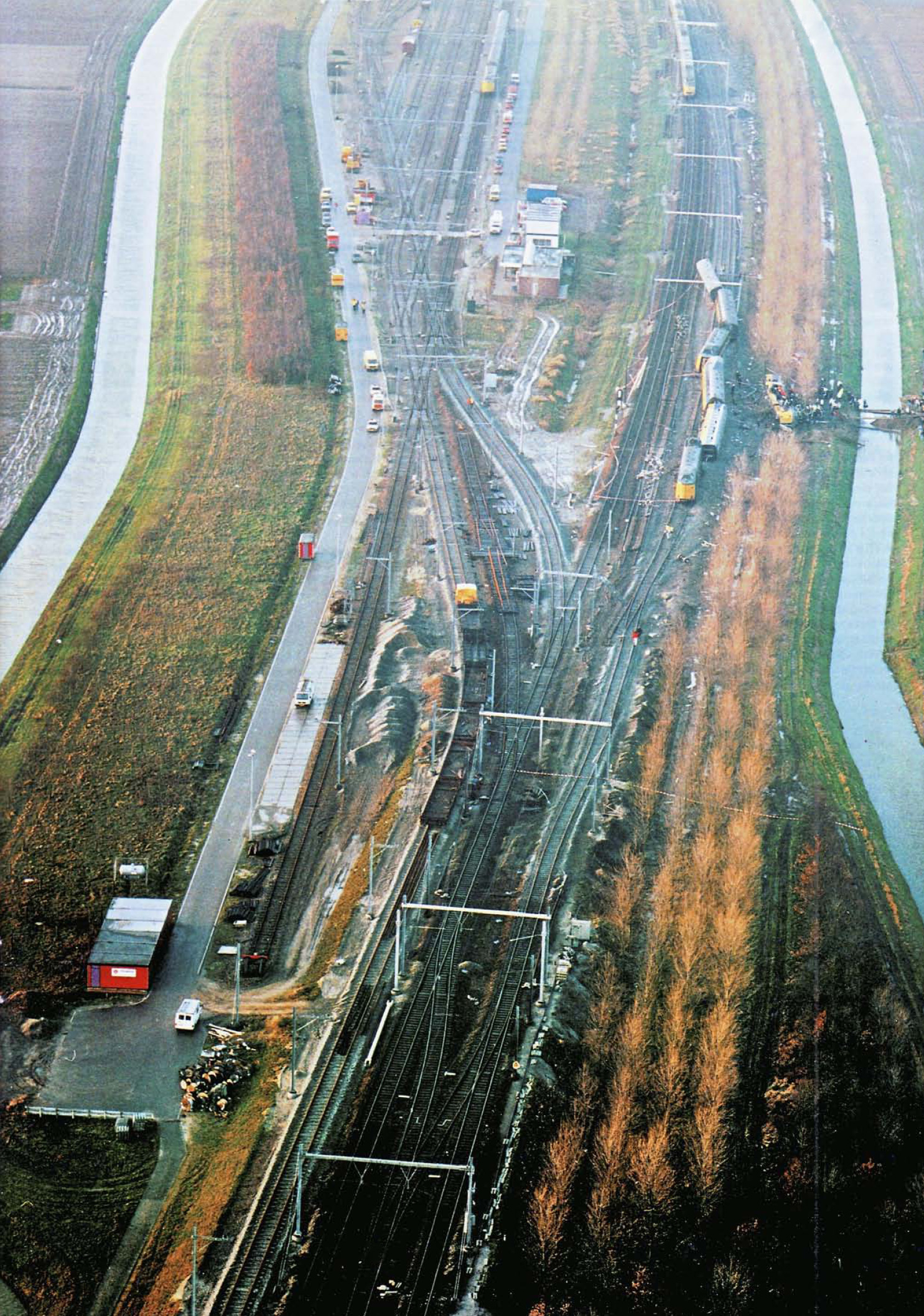
- Hoofddorp train accident
  November 30 – Netherlands – Hoofddorp train accident: An Intercity train, travelling from Amsterdam to Vlissingen derailed near Hoofddorp, killing five people and injuring 33.

== 1993 ==
- January 18 - United States - 1993 South Shore Line collision, two South Shore Line trains collided head-on in Gary, Indiana, killing 7 people and injuring 70 people.
- January 31 – Kenya – Along the Ngai Ndethya River near Mtito Andei, a Kenya Railways train traveling from Mombasa to Nairobi derailed due to flooding from the river, killing 140 people.
- March 14 – Brazil – Near Vila São Paulino, in Ipê, two freight trains operated by the Rede Ferroviária Federal S.A. (RFFSA) collided head-on inside Tunnel 10 (km 220 of the railway) after a communication failure placed both trains on the same track. One of the trains was carrying alcohol, resulting in a massive explosion and fire that lasted for more than three days. Three locomotive engineers were killed and one person was injured.
- March 28 – South Korea – a Mugunghwa-ho train in the vicinity of Gupo station in Busan rolled over due to subsidence under a section of track caused by nearby construction, killing 78 people and injuring 198, making it the worst rail accident in South Korea.
- August 2 – Spain – 12 people died after a freight train collided head-on with a FEVE passenger train in a tunnel near Vega de Anzo village, in Grado municipality (Asturias). Another 7 people were seriously injured. The collision took place at only 45 km/h, and the victims were due to burns and asphyxiation because of the fire caused by the diesel fuel that powered the locomotives and the resinous cargo of the freight train.
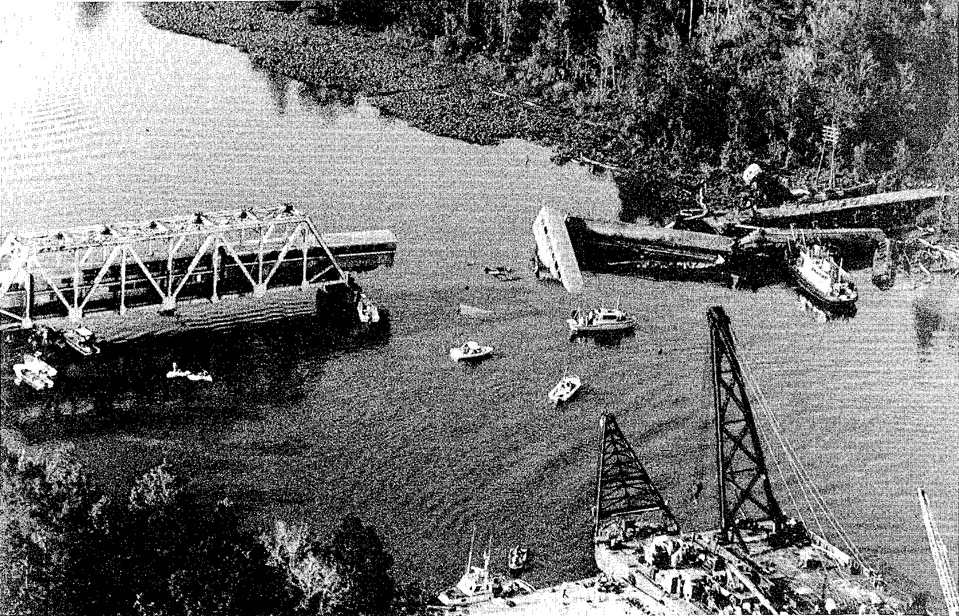
- Big Bayou Canot rail accident
  September 22 – United States – Big Bayou Canot rail accident, near Mobile, Alabama: Barges being pushed by an off-course towboat collided with a bridge piling; the bridge shifted out of alignment, creating a kink in the rails on the CSXT's former Louisville & Nashville Gulfcoast line. Minutes later, Amtrak's Sunset Limited derailed at high speed on the misaligned track and plunges into the water, causing an enormous fuel spill and fire that killed 47 people in Amtrak's deadliest accident.
- November 2 - Indonesia - 20 people were killed and 200 people were injured after 2 commuter train collided head-on in Ratujaya, near Depok.
- November 11 – United States – near Kelso, Washington: A Union Pacific and a Burlington Northern freight train collided head-on after the Burlington Northern train had failed to stop for a red signal, likely due to dense fog, killing the five crew members on board both trains. Due to this, the two railroads implemented new safety features called "Precision Train Control" (an ancestor to the later federally mandated, Positive Train Control) on 750 miles (1200 km) of UP and BN track.

== 1994 ==
- January 13 - United States - In Pasco County, Florida, A Barnum & Bailey circus train carrying circus members derailed due to a track failure and caught fire, killing two people.
- February 8 - Georgia - A head-on collision between two passenger trains kills three engine drivers.
- March 8 – Switzerland – a freight train derailed at Zurich. A tank wagon carrying petrol exploded, injuring three people.
- March 9 – South Africa – A commuter train derailed in a suburb of Durban, KwaZulu-Natal, killing at least 63 people and injuring 370 in one of South Africa's deadliest rail disasters.
- March 21 – Switzerland – The side of a passenger train from Brig to Romanshorn was ripped out by a crane wagon at Däniken, killing nine people.
- May 16 – United States – Amtrak's Silver Meteor passenger train, bound from New York to Florida, derailed near Selma, North Carolina after hitting a cargo container jutting out from a passing freight. The Amtrak engineer was killed and nearly 100 passengers were injured.
- June 25 – United Kingdom – Greenock rail crash, Scotland: Two people were killed after a train struck concrete blocks placed on the track by vandals.
- June 29 – Switzerland – Lausanne derailment – A freight train derailed at Lausanne station. Following a spillage of chemicals from the tank cars, the station was closed and the population evacuated.
- August 3 – United States – The Lake Shore Limited, operated by Amtrak, derailed on Conrail tracks in Batavia, New York. 108 passengers and 10 crew members were injured. Cars 8–12 on the consist fell down an embankment.
- September 22 – Angola – 1994 Tolunda rail disaster – Faulty brakes cause the derailment of a train in Tolunda. The train plunged into a ravine, killing 300 people.
- September 29 – Germany – Two passenger trains collided head-on near Bad Bramstedt, killing six people and injuring 67.
- October 15 – United Kingdom – Cowden rail crash – Two trains collided head-on in Cowden, Kent, after a driver ran through a red signal; killing five people and injuring 12.
- November 20 – Canada – VIA Rail train No. 66, travelling eastward at approximately 155 km/h (96 mph), struck a piece of rail intentionally placed on the track at the CN North America (CN) Kingston Subdivision, in Brighton, Ontario. The piece of rail punctured a locomotive fuel tank and severed electrical power cables creating electrical arcing which ignited the leaking fuel. A fire erupted and the trailing portion of the locomotive and the first two-passenger cars behind the locomotive became engulfed in flames. 46 passengers were injured.
- December 2 – Hungary – Szajol – A train going to Budapest derailed after passing through a false switch at 110 km/h. It collided with a station building, killing 31 people and injuring 52. It was the second-worst rail incident in post-World War II Hungary.
- December 14 – United States - San Bernardino, California – A Santa Fe intermodal freight train rear-ended a parked Union Pacific coal train at the Cajon Pass due to a kink in the air hose that triggered the brakes, injuring two crewmembers who were forced to jump from their runaway train going 50 mph (80 km/h).

== 1995 ==
- January 31 – United Kingdom – 1995 Ais Gill rail accident: A diesel multiple unit ran into a landslip at Ais Gill, Cumbria and was derailed. Another diesel multiple unit then collided with it. One person was killed and 30 were injured.
- May 10 – South Africa – Vaal Reefs Tragedy: A mine locomotive operating 1,700 m (5,600 ft) below ground fell into an elevator shaft. It struck the "detaching hook", separating the cable from the double-deck elevator car, which fell a further 600 m (2,000 ft). All 104 miners on board were killed. It is history's worst elevator accident.
- May 26 – United States – Two SB CSX freights collided near Flomaton, Alabama, on the former Louisville and Nashville Railroad, forcing the evacuation of residents. One of the derailed tank cars leaked vinyl chloride.
- June 16 – United States – Canadian Pacific 1278 boiler explosion: Gardners, Pennsylvania. A Gettysburg Railroad steam locomotive, Canadian Pacific 4-6-2 Number 1278, suffered a catastrophic boiler explosion due to low water, seriously injuring three crew. The National Transportation Safety Board reported that an even more serious explosion had been averted by the fact that the locomotive was fitted with fusible plugs, a safety feature rarely found in North America but common in Europe. Major new regulation of steam locomotives followed.
- June 24 – Czech Republic – Krouna train accident: Four runaway carriages smashed into a passenger train. 19 people were killed, only four passengers survived.
- July 10 – United States – Canadian Pacific 2317: Dunmore, Pennsylvania. A Steamtown-owned steam locomotive, Canadian Pacific 4-6-2 Number 2317, en route from Moscow to Scranton struck and killed two young boys who were trying to pry one of their jammed ATVs from the tracks.
- July 11 - United Kingdom - Largs, Scotland - A train collided with a buffer and hit a ticket office, injuring four people.
- August 11 – Canada – 1995 Russell Hill subway accident, Toronto: A subway train collided with the stationary train ahead after a driver misinterpreted a signal and the automatic train stop failed. Three people were killed, and 30 injured.
- August 20 – India – Firozabad rail disaster. A passenger train collided with another train that had stopped after it had run over a cow in Firozabad, killing 358 people.

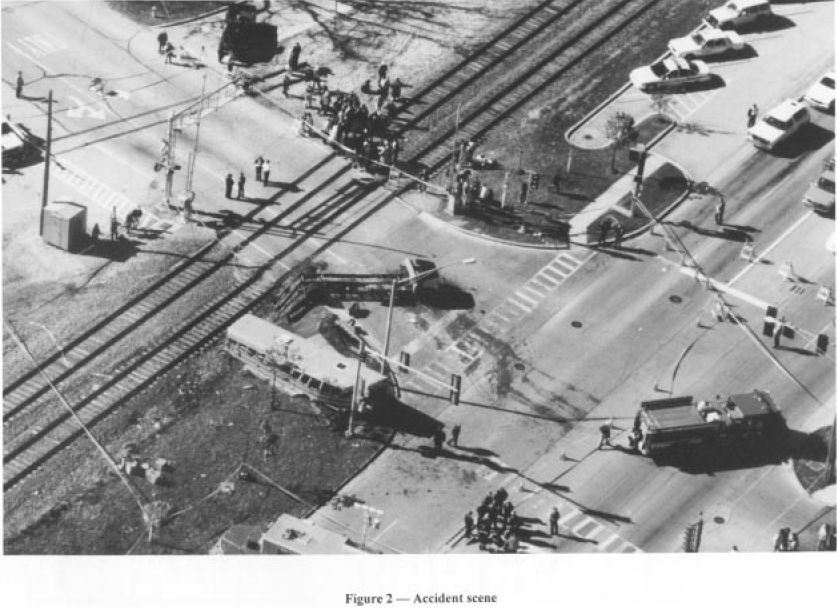
The destroyed school bus in the Fox River Grove level crossing accident.

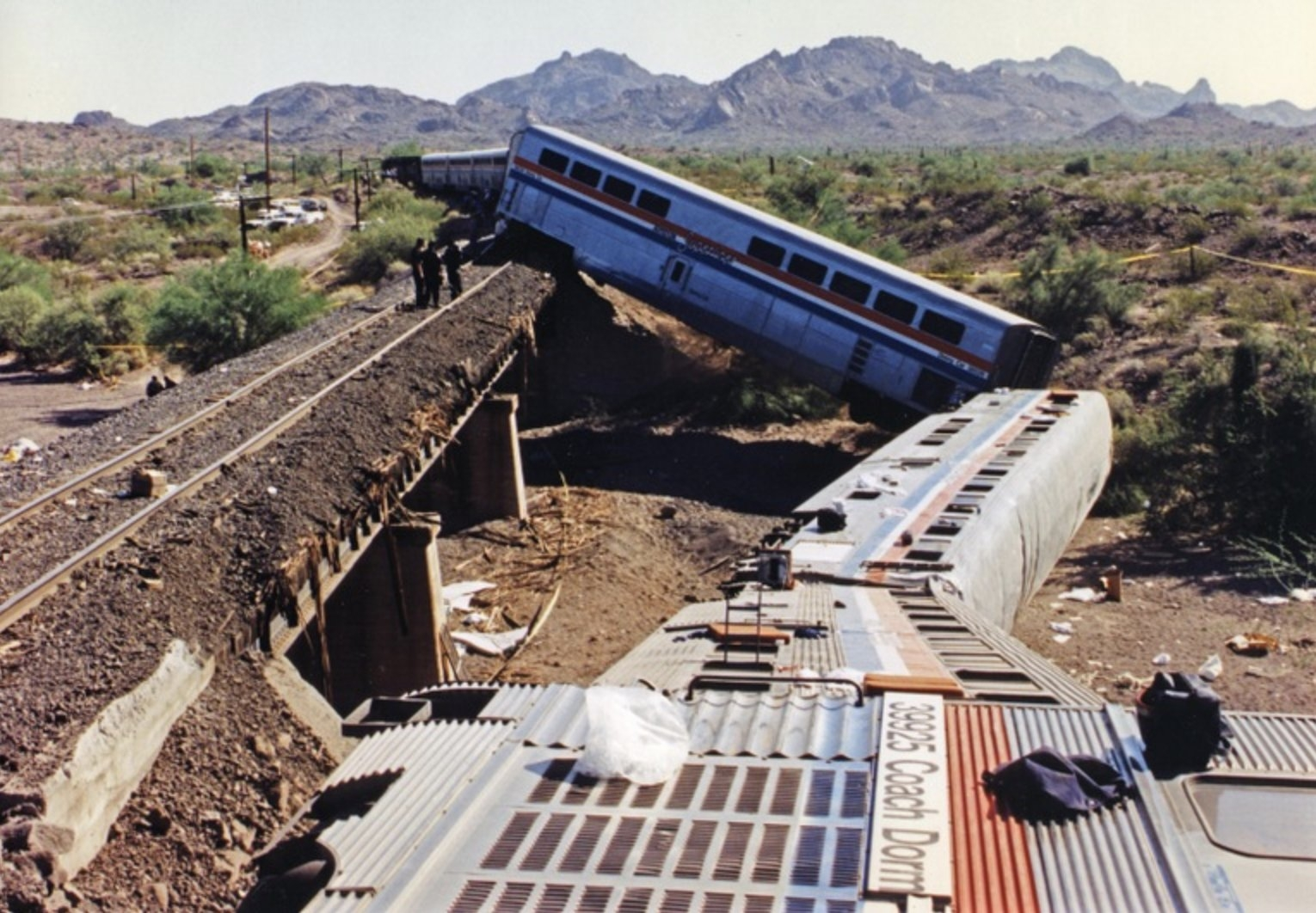
- 1995 Palo Verde, Arizona, derailment
  October 9 – United States – Palo Verde, Arizona Derailment, Palo Verde, Arizona: Unidentified saboteurs shifted a rail out of alignment after attaching a jumper circuit, keeping the signalling circuit closed. Amtrak's Sunset Limited subsequently derailed, plunging four cars into a dry riverbed killing one and injuring 78 people, 12 seriously.
- October 24 - Indonesia - In Kadipaten, Tasikmalaya, two merged trains loses brake, crashed and fell into a ravine in the Trowek area (now around Cirahayu station), killing dozens and injuring hundreds more.
- October 25 – United States – 1995 Fox River Grove bus–train collision: A school bus caught between a railroad crossing and a red traffic light is hit by a Metra commuter train, killing seven students.
- October 28 – Azerbaijan – 1995 Baku Metro fire: A Baku Metro subway train caught fire between Ulduz and Nariman Narimanov stations during evening rush hour. 289 people were killed and 265 injured. An electrical fault was blamed, but sabotage was not ruled out. The accident remains the deadliest subway disaster to date.
- December 12 - Germany - Garmisch-Partenkirchen train collision: in Garmisch, a Obb Train crashed into a DB Train after skipping a red light, killing one person and injuring 47.
- December 21 – Egypt – A Cairo-Beni Sueif passenger train and Cairo-Aswan passenger train collided in dense fog in Badrasheen railroad station, killing 75 people and injuring 150.
- December 25 – Spain – Jaén: An express from Barcelona to Seville via Málaga derailed at a bridge over the 50 m (160 ft) deep Despeñaperros canyon. The locomotive came to rest in a near-vertical position leaning against the bridge, but remained coupled to the first car, suspending the car's forward end above the bridge. The two enginemen were killed.

== 1996 ==
- January 6 – United States – Shady Grove Metrorail station, Derwood, Maryland: A Washington Metro train overran the station platform at Shady Grove and collided with a stored train. The operator of the overrunning train was killed.
- January 14 - Australia - Hines Hill train collision: two trains entered a passing loop from opposite directions after one of them passed a signal at danger. The engineer of one of the trains, along with one passenger, were killed.
- February 1 – United States – Cajon Pass, San Bernardino County, California: An AT&SF freight train carrying hazardous materials derailed due to failed brakes in the steep pass, killing two crewmen, injuring the engineer, and shutting down Interstate 15 for several days due to a cloud of noxious fumes.
- February 9 - United States - 1996 Secaucus train collision: Two New Jersey Transit trains collided in the morning rush killing three people. The cause was later determined to be the colorblindness of one of the engineers.
- February 14 - United States - St. Paul, Minnesota - A BNSF freight train slammed into two parked SOO Line locomotives, and a parked Canadian Pacific freight train in the St. Paul Railyard due to a kink in the air hose that prevented the brakes from being applied. 44 cars and six locomotives derailed, while nine workers were injured, and an office building was destroyed.
- February 16 – United States – 1996 Maryland train collision: A MARC commuter train bound for Washington Union Station, collided with outbound Amtrak train no. 29, the westbound Capitol Limited after the MARC crew apparently forgot an approach signal and failed to reduce speed, killings three crew and eight passengers aboard the MARC train. Eight of the dead were killed by smoke and flames possibly ignited by oil pot switch heaters. This led to the FRA instituting the Delay in Block Rule, and also was a major impetus for the Passenger Equipment Safety Standards regulation (49 CFR Part 238).

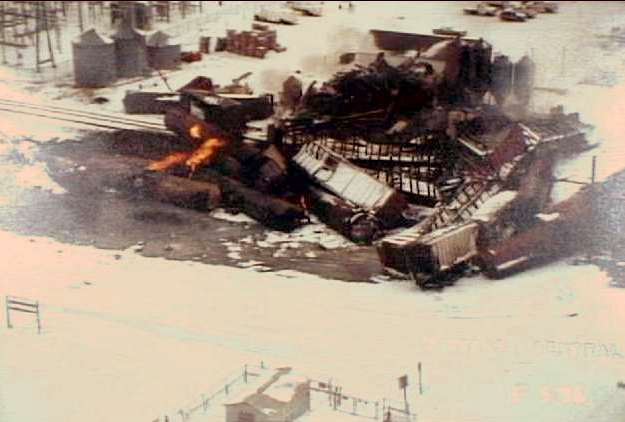
Weyauwega derailment aftermath, March 5, 1996.

- March 4 – United States – Weyauwega, Wisconsin, derailment: A broken switch derailed a Wisconsin Central train carrying liquefied petroleum gas and propane. The town of Weyauwega, Wisconsin, was evacuated as the fire burns for most of the 18-day evacuation.
- March 8 – United Kingdom – 1996 Stafford rail crash: A freight train derailed due to an axle failure and was then struck by a Travelling Post Office train, killing one person and injuring 22.
- April 18 – India – Gorakhpur– A Gonda passenger train crashed into a stationary freight train at Domingarh station, killing at least 60.
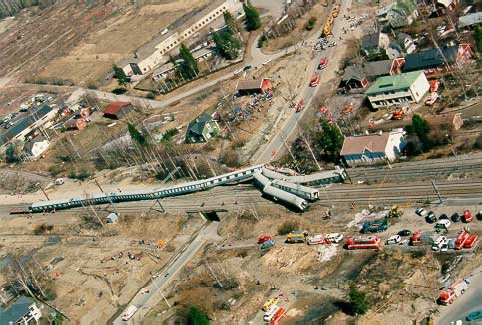
- Jokela rail accident
  April 21 – Finland – Jokela rail accident: A passenger train operating in heavy fog derailed at Jokela after overspeeding through a slow-speed turnout. The locomotive driver and three passengers were killed, and 75 were injured.
- July 2 – Ukraine – 1996 Dniprodzerzhynsk tram accident: An overcrowded tram car derailed and crashed through a concrete wall after its brakes failed while going down a steep hill, killing 34 people and injuring over 100.
- August 8 – United Kingdom – Watford rail crash: An electric multiple unit overran a signal at Watford Junction and stopped foul of a junction before being hit head-on by an electric multiple unit, killing one person and injuring 69.
- September 16 – Switzerland – A passenger train collided with a locomotive at Courfaivre after passing a signal at danger, injuring 30 people.
- September 26 – Russia – A level crossing collision of a diesel locomotive into a school bus between Bataysk and Salsk in Rostov Oblast killed 19 people, including 18 children.
- November 18 – France / United Kingdom – 1996 Channel Tunnel fire: A fire occurred on board a Eurotunnel Shuttle train inside the Channel Tunnel, injuring 34 people.

== 1997 ==
- January 12 – Italy – A Pendolino train derailed due to excessive speed just before Piacenza station, killing eight people and injuring 29 others.
- March 3 – Pakistan – Five coaches of a Karachi-bound train from Peshawar overturned near Khanewal after the train's brakes failed and it was driven onto a runaway track, killing 110 people and injuring 150.
- July 28 – India – 12 people died in a collision at Faridabad in the Delhi suburbs.
- August 9 – United States – Amtrak Southwest Chief (Train Number 4) derailed on an old wooden bridge due to a severe thunderstorms, injuring 173 people.
- August 28 – China – Jilin, Changchun –A passenger train from Harbin railway station to Harbin railway station collided with a freight train and derailed, killing four people and injuring nine.
- September 8 – France – A passenger train collided with a fuel tanker on a level crossing at Port-Sainte-Foy, Dordogne, killing 13 people and injuring over 40. This remains France's worst ever level crossing accident.
- September 14 – India – 5 coaches of the Howrah–Ahmedabad Express come off the bridge near Champa, Madhya Pradesh (now Chhattisgarh). 81 people were killed and 175 people were injured.
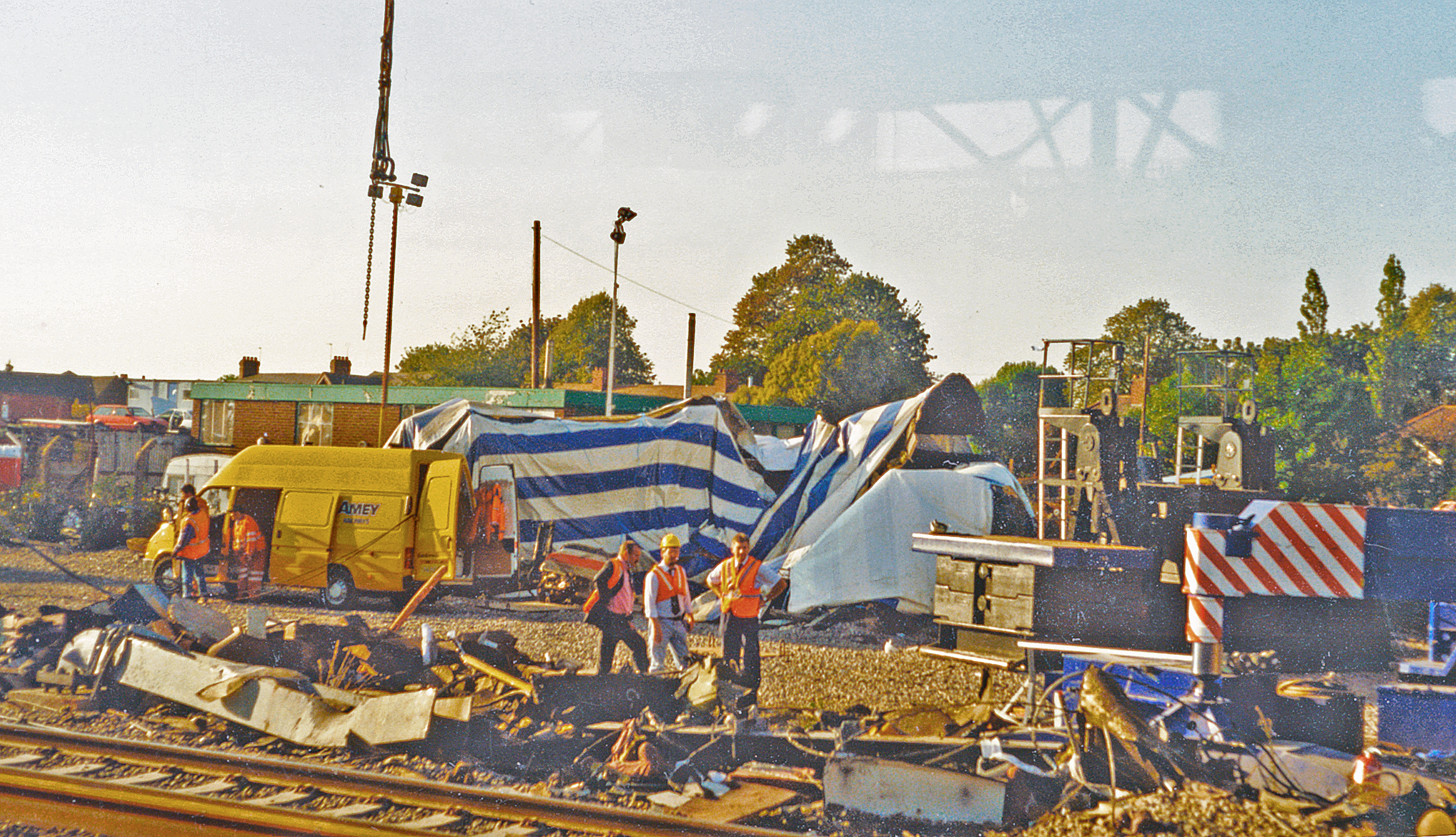
- Aftermath of the Southall rail crash
  September 19 – United Kingdom – Southall rail crash, London: An inter-city train failed to stop at a red signal due to driver distraction and collided with a freight train crossing its path, killing seven people and injuring 139.
- November 8 – Ireland – Westport train derailment: An Iarnród Eireann train travelling between Dublin Heuston and Westport derailed 2 miles west of Knockcroghery, County Roscommon due to a broken rail that had been missed by a routine inspection. The train was travelling at between 50 and 60 miles per hour when it derailed at a level crossing. Four people were detained in hospital, none seriously injured.
- November 13 – Switzerland – Two passenger trains collided at Appenzell after one of them passed a signal at danger, injuring 17 people.
- December 9 – Germany – Hanover: A regional train collided with a freight train carrying petrol. Five of the wrecked tankers ignited and exploded. More than 90 people were injured.

== 1998 ==
- February 15 – Cameroon – Yaoundé train explosion: Spilt fuel oil from a tanker train crash ignited and exploded, killing more than 100 people.

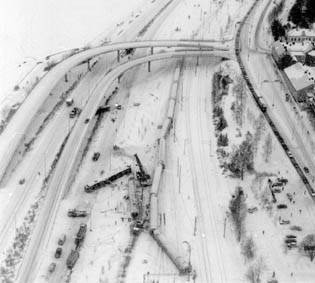
The Jyväskylä derailment

- March 6 – Finland – Jyväskylä rail accident: An express passenger train derailed at Jyväskylä after overspeeding while passing over a slow-speed turnout. The locomotive driver and nine passengers were killed, 94 people were injured.
- April 4 – India – Fatuha train crash: At least 11 people died near Patna (near Fatuha station) on the Howrah-Delhi main line after the Howrah-Danapur Express derailed.
- June 3 – Germany – Eschede train disaster: Part of a high-speed ICE train derailed at Eschede and strikes a bridge due to a faulty wheel rim. The bridge collapsed as the third car hit its pylons, the remaining cars and the rear power unit jackknifed into the pile. The first three carriages were separated from each other and came to a halt at Eschede railway station while the undamaged power car continued for another two kilometres until its brakes were automatically applied. 101 people were killed in the world's worst ever high-speed rail disaster.
- October 18 – Egypt – An Alexandria–Cairo passenger train crashed at Kafr el-Dawar station, Nile Delta, after its driver exceeded the speed limit, killing 47 people and injuring 104.
- November 26 – India – Khanna rail disaster: The Sealdah express rammed into three cars of derailed carriages of Golden Temple mail bound for Amritsar at Khanna station, on the outskirts of Ludhiana, Punjab, at least 212 people were killed.

== 1999 ==
- March 15 – United States – 1999 Bourbonnais, Illinois, train crash: The Amtrak City of New Orleans, traveling at approximately 80 miles per hour (130 km/h), slammed into a semi-trailer truck loaded with steel concrete reinforcing bar (rebar) at a grade crossing and derails. An ensuing fire set one Superliner sleeper car ablaze. Eleven people were killed and over 100 were injured. It was subsequently determined that the truck driver had ignored the grade crossing signals and driven around the lowered gates.
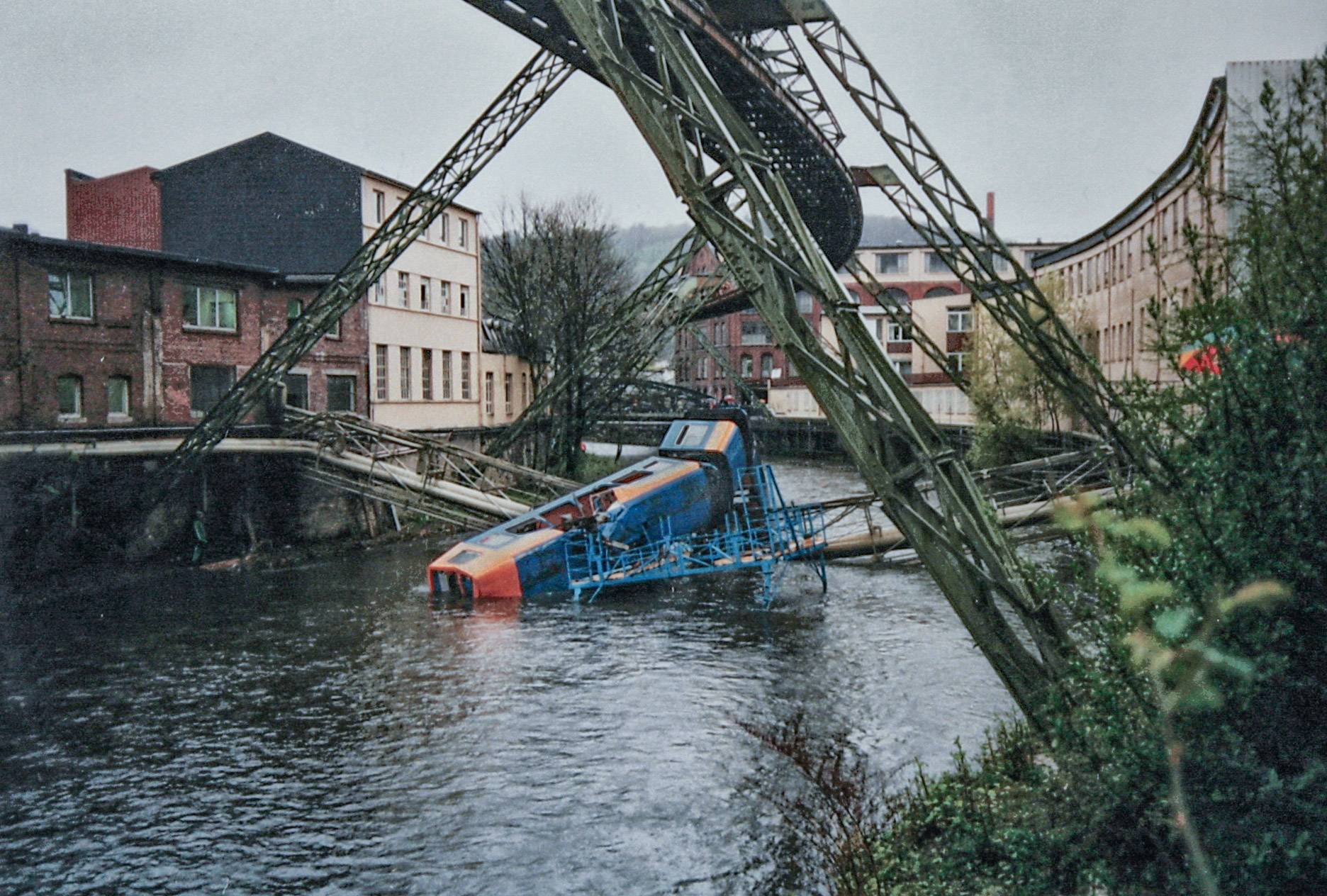
- 1999 Wuppertal Schwebebahn accident
  April 12 – Germany – 1999 Wuppertal Schwebebahn accident: In Wuppertal, workers doing overnight maintenance on the Schwebebahn forgot to unscrew a metal clamp from the elevated monorail track. The first train in the morning hit it, derailed, and crashed into the river below, killing 5 passengers and injuring 47.
- April 23 – Canada – VIA Rail train No. 74, encountered an unexpected reversed switch, crossed over to the south main track and derailed at Thamesville, Ontario. The derailed train collided with stationary rail cars on an adjacent yard track and all four passenger cars and the locomotive of the passenger train derailed. The two train crew members in the locomotive cab were killed.
- August 2 – India – Gaisal train disaster: Two express trains collided head-on, killing more than 285 people.
- August 18 - Australia - Zanthus train collision: In Zanthus, Western Australia, an Indian Pacific Train crashed into an Nrc Train and derailed, injuring 21 people.
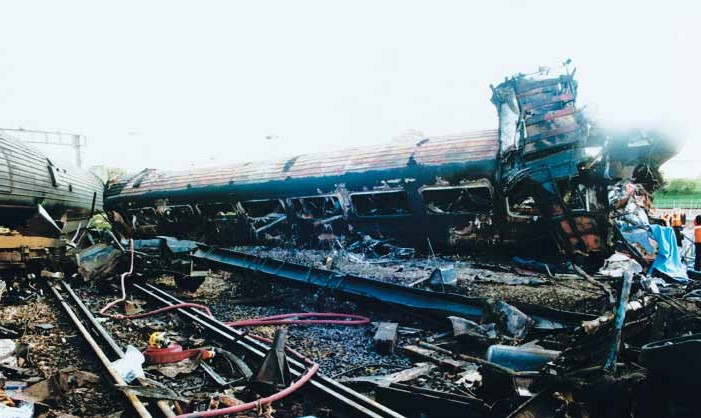
- Ladbroke Grove rail crash
  October 5 – United Kingdom – Ladbroke Grove rail crash: A high-speed head-on collision between two trains occurred due to a signal passed at danger. The fuel tanks of one of the trains were destroyed and the contents were ignited by overhead power lines, causing a fireball, killing 31 people and injuring more than 520.
- November 1 – Switzerland – Two trains collided in Bern after one of them passed a signal at danger, killing two people.
- December 3 – Australia – Glenbrook rail accident, New South Wales: Stop and Proceed rule at red signal applied with insufficient care (too much speed), killing seven.
- December 30 – Canada – Mont-Saint-Hilaire, Quebec: Several tank cars filled with gasoline and heating oil from the CN freight train 703 travelling westward derailed as it was passing the CN freight train 306, travelling in the opposite direction on a parallel track. Train 306 hit the derailed cars, which exploded on impact, killing the engineer and the conductor of the 306 and starting a fire which burned 2.7 million liters of oil and forced the evacuation of 350 families within a 2-kilometer radius over the next four days.

== See also ==
- List of road accidents – includes level crossing accidents.
- List of British rail accidents
- List of Russian rail accidents
- Years in rail transport

== Sources ==
- Haine, Edgar A. (1993). Railroad wrecks. Associated University Presses. ISBN 978-0-8453-4844-4.
- Rolt, L. T. C.; Kichenside, G. M. (1982). Red for Danger: A history of railway accidents and railway safety (4th ed.). Newton Abbot, Devon: David & Charles. ISBN 0-7153-8362-0. OCLC 9526651.
- Shaw, Robert B. (1978). A History of Railroad Accidents, Safety Precautions and Operating Practices. LCCN 78104064.
- Earnshaw, Alan (1993). Trains in Trouble: Vol. 8. Penryn: Atlantic Books. ISBN 0-906899-52-4.
- Kichenside, Geoffrey (1997). Great Train Disasters. Bristol: Paragon. ISBN 0-7525-2229-9.
