= Nuneaton rail crash =

British rail disaster

Coordinates: 52.5246°N 1.4610°W

- The aftermath of the crash, which killed six people and injured 38.

Details
- Date: 6 June 1975
- Location: Nuneaton railway station, Warwickshire
- Country: England
- Line: West Coast Main Line
- Operator: British Rail
- Service: 23:30 sleeper train from London Euston to Glasgow
- Incident type: High speed derailment
- Cause: Overspeed on temporary track; Driver error/lineside equipment failure

Statistics
- Trains: 1
- Vehicles: 2 class 86 locomotives and 15 carriages (12 Mark 1 sleeping cars, two Brake/Guard vans and a Restaurant miniature buffet)
- Deaths: 6 (4 passengers and 2 staff)
- Injured: 38

The Nuneaton rail crash occurred on 6 June 1975, on the West Coast Main Line just south of Nuneaton railway station in Warwickshire, England, United Kingdom.

The crash happened when the 23:30 sleeper from London Euston to Glasgow derailed after entering a temporary speed restriction at 4 times the speed limit. Six people (four passengers and two staff) died and 38 were injured. In the subsequent inquiry, the crash was deemed to have been caused by driver error, partially due to the failure of gas lit lamps that illuminated the lineside signage warning of the speed restriction, which resulted to the addition of AWS magnets at every temporary speed restriction site on the British railway network ever since.

== Background ==
=== The station ===
Nuneaton railway station is situated on the Trent Valley section of the West Coast Main Line running from London Euston to destinations such as Manchester Piccadilly, Liverpool Lime Street and Glasgow Central; in addition to this it is served by other lines going towards Coventry, Birmingham New Street and Leicester, operated by British Rail.

Illuminated warning board for a 20 mph speed restriction, as it would have looked like at the time of the accident

In January 1975, a track remodelling scheme commenced at Nuneaton, which would last during most of the year; by 24 May 1975, the ninth stage of the remodelling scheme went into effect, affecting the fast lines at the Eastern end of the station. The work carried out at the time involved removing the old set of points and crossovers and replacing them with a plain track with authorised speeds of 20 mph (32 km/h), down from the standard line speed of 100 mph (161 km/h); the intention was that later on, a new set of points and crossovers would be installed there, on a new alignment. The temporary stretch of track included some sharp curves. According to the permanent way engineer who supervised the track alterations at Nuneaton, some trains would overspeed and travel through the temporary track section at 25 mph (40 km/h), and believed that the track was built to handle speeds as high as 40 mph (64 km/h), with trains only being at real risk at 45 mph (72 km/h); additionally, it would take roughly four months until the speed restrictions would be fully lifted.

The speed restriction warning boards were installed on 23 May 1975, two days before the restrictions came into effect and a mile and a quarter away from the speed restriction commencement boards, at the "standard service braking distance". These were gas lit lamps powered with the help of two 42 lb (19 kg) canisters, which would have provided a week and ten days' worth of lighting, day and night. However, as the canisters were set up incorrectly, the automatic changeover valve that would have changed the supply from one canister to another (after the first one would have emptied) had not been put in use, meaning that at some point, the lights would go out. There were also no other types of warnings installed in regards to the speed restriction, meaning that if the lights would go out, train crews would have no way of telling if the speed restriction had been lifted or if it was still in place.

Ten days before the crash, a daytime InterCity train running from London Euston to Glasgow Central had entered the speed restricted area at 40 mph (64 km/h) instead of 20 mph (32 km/h) because its driver had misread the Weekly Engineering Notice and assumed that the speed restrictions applied to the Down Slow line and not to the Down Fast line he was on, as a result of this, a passenger was scalded by drinks but the train did not derail. In this case the speed restriction boards were illuminated and the driver applied heavy braking in order to avoid a derailment.

=== The train ===
The two locomotives seen in the crash, as pictured in the 1980s

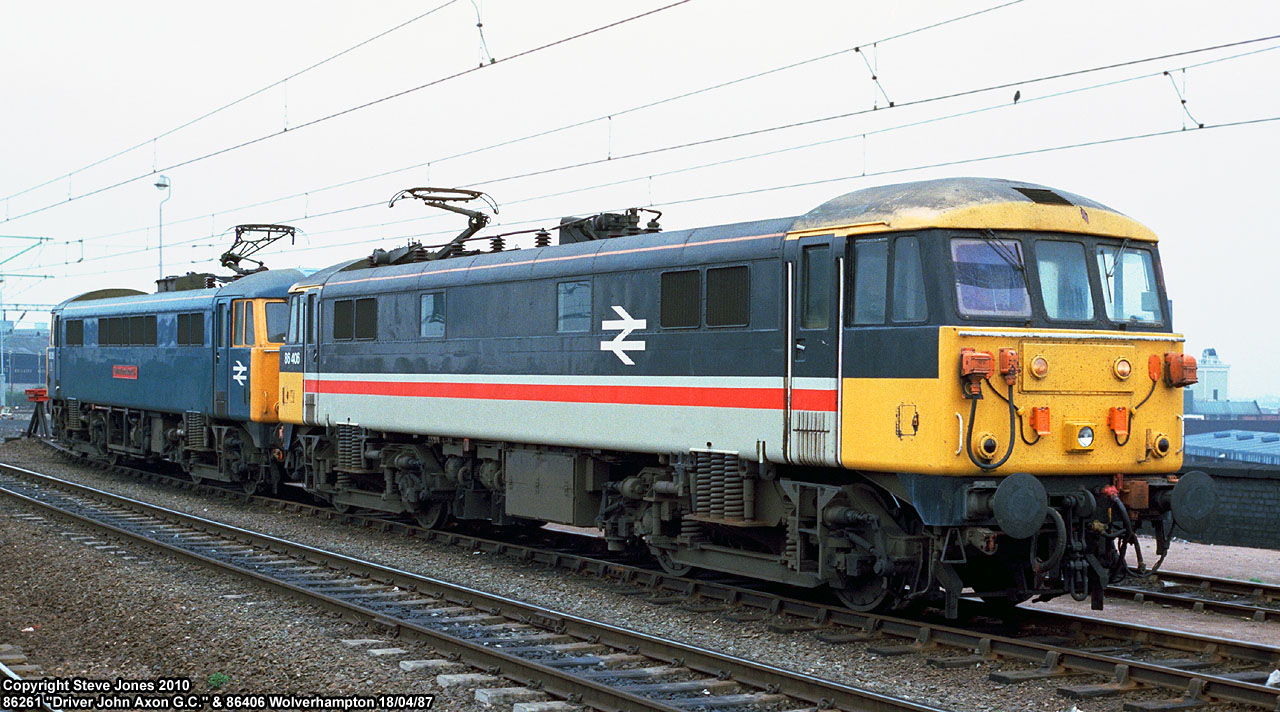
86006 (renumbered to 86406)

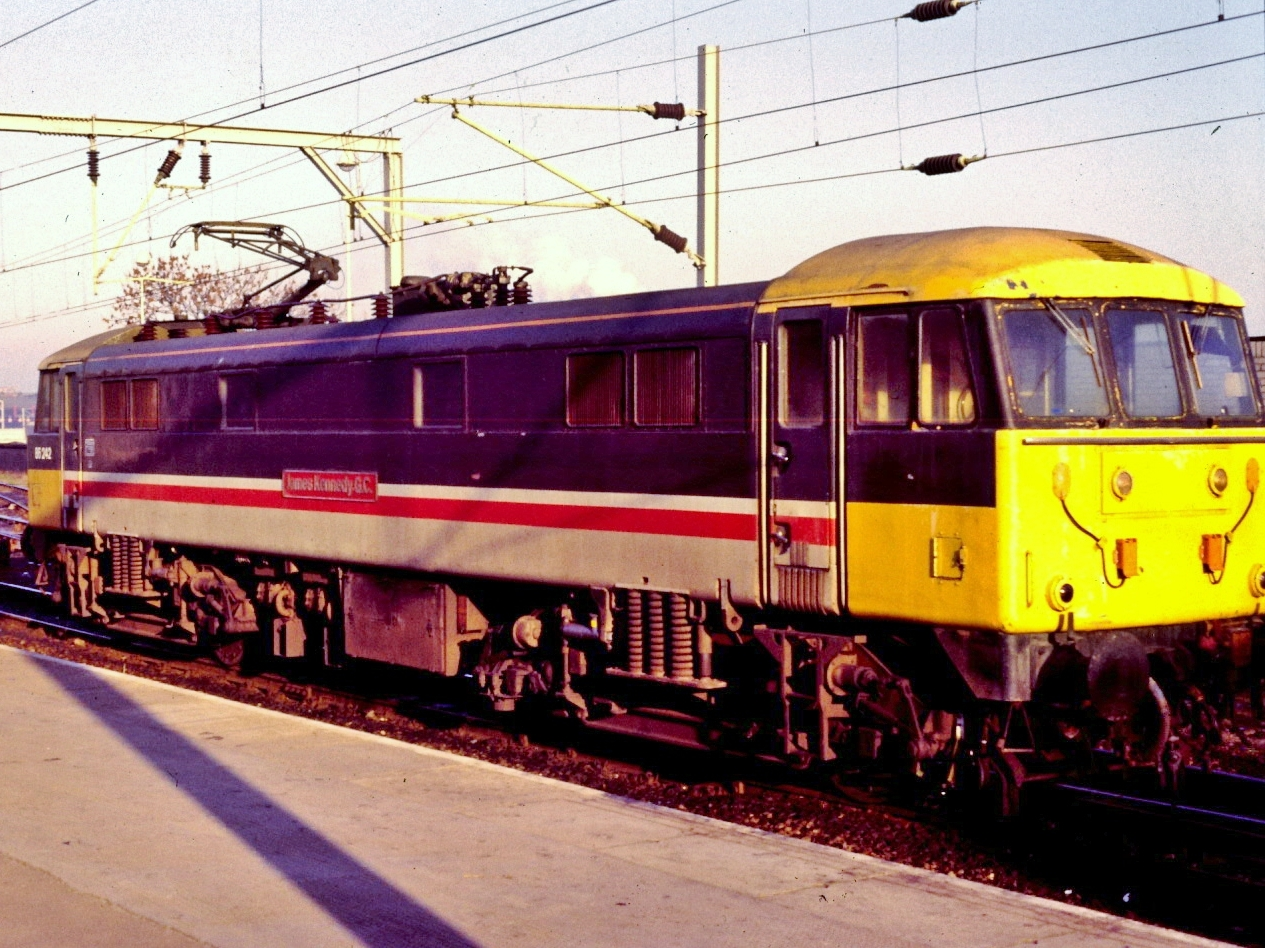
86242

The train involved in the crash carried the headcode 1S26 and was the 23:30 London Euston to Glasgow Central InterCity Sleeper train, a precursor to the present-day Caledonian Sleeper. Its composition was at follows:

- Locomotive 86006
- Locomotive 86242
- Brake Van Gangwayed (M81389)
- Sleeping Car Second Twin-Berth and Pantry (M2637)
- Sleeping Car First (M2008)
- Sleeping Car Composite (M2454)
- Sleeping Car First (M2027)
- Sleeping Car Second Twin-Berth and Pantry (M2632)
- Restaurant Car Miniature Buffet (M1846)
- Sleeping Car First (M2011)
- Sleeping Car Second Twin-Berth and Pantry (M2663)
- Sleeping Car First (M2024)
- Sleeping Car Second Twin-Berth and Pantry (M2629)
- Sleeping Car First (M2032)
- Sleeping Car Second Twin-Berth and Pantry (M2662)
- Sleeping Car Second Twin-Berth and Pantry (M2616)
- Brake Van Gangwayed (M81530)

The train had 15 Mark 1 carriages and a length of 1,096 ft 9 in (334.29 m) overall and had a total weight of 749 long tons (761 t), the braking force was of 561.4 long tons (570.4 t), which was around 74.9% of the total train weight and was vacuum braked.

== Sequence of events ==
View of the cleanup efforts, 7 June 1975
Photos by Nigel Tout

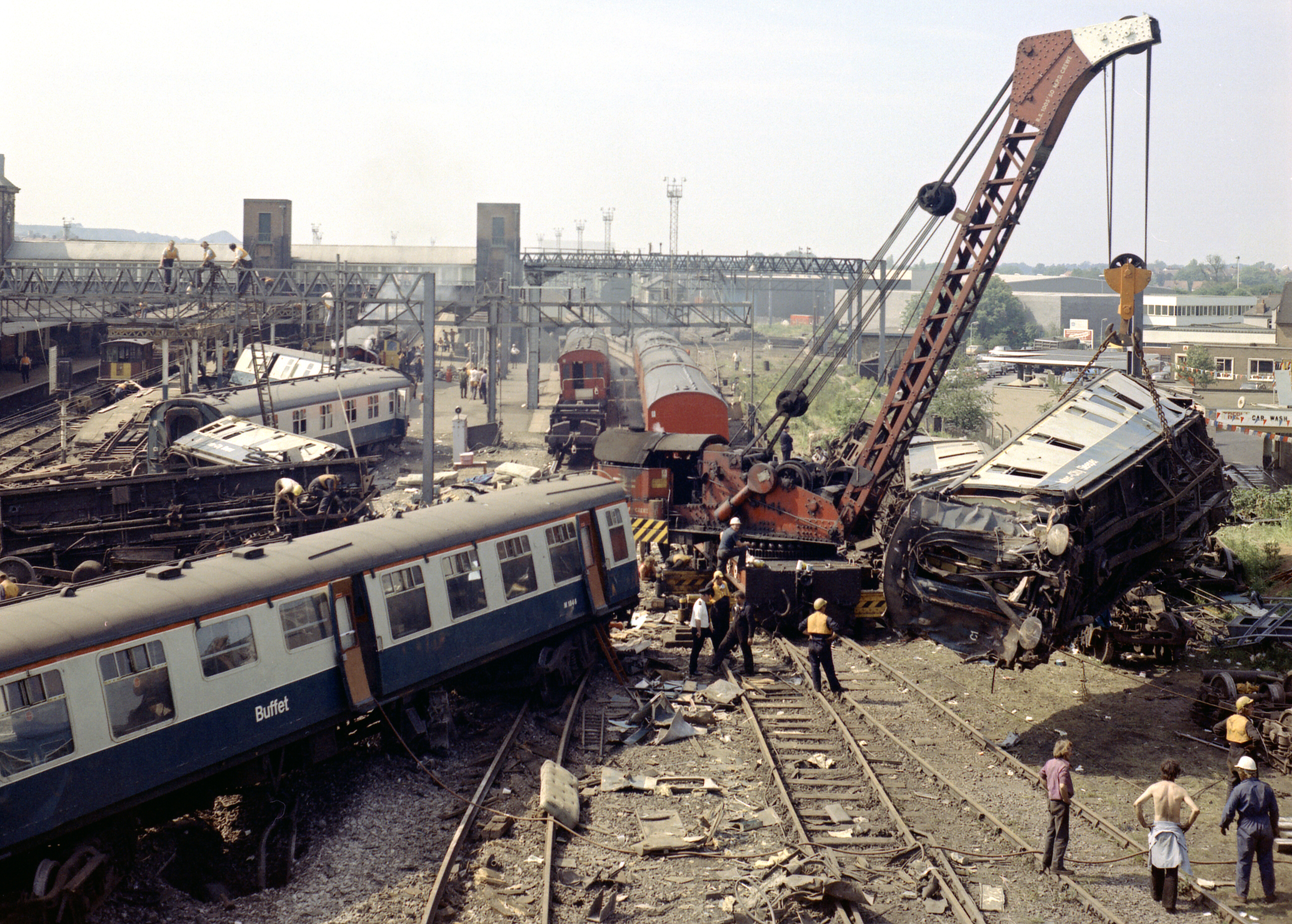
One of the breakdown cranes lifting the remains of a sleeping carriage

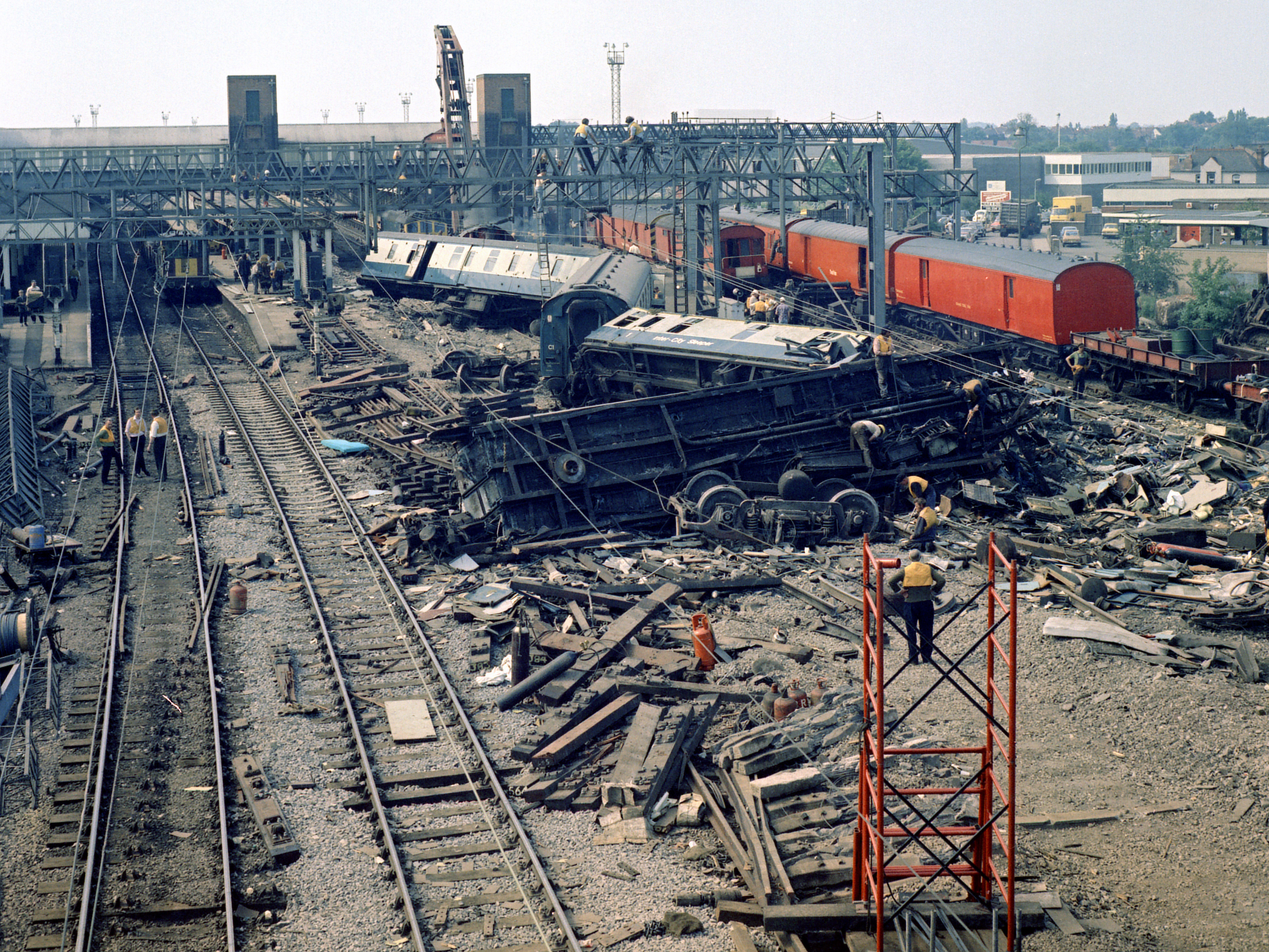
Remains of the train's carriages and damage to the surrounding infrastructure

=== Before the crash ===
On the night of 5 June 1975, Driver John McKay, alongside secondman L. W. Norman signed on duty at London Euston and, after meeting with the train guard, prepared the train for departure and left as scheduled at 23:30, with secondman Norman at the controls of locomotive 86242. However, near Kings Langley, the train was left stranded due to the locomotive's failure, it was stopped for over an hour until another Class 86 locomotive from Willesden TMD was brought over and coupled to the front of the train. The train was able to proceed and after having nearly crawled to a halt at Hemel Hempstead in order to allow the crew members of the relief locomotive to get off at the platform, Driver McKay, who was now at the controls of 86006 and the train behind it, was now driving at a constant speed of 90 mph (145 km/h) in order to minimise the 75 minute delay that they had gained while at a standstill. Between Watford Junction and Crewe, there were no scheduled stops and the train had made good progress up to the approach to Nuneaton.

At Nuneaton, the gas in the first canister was running low, and as a result of the incorrect setup of the automatic valve, the lights on the speed restriction warning board for the Down Fast line became dimmer and dimmer until they were fully extinguished between 1:10 and 1:40 AM. During this time, three other trains passed the speed restriction and complied with it, but they had failed to stop in order to inform the signalman at the first convenient opportunity, as required by Rule T25.5 of the British Railways' Board's "Rules for Observance by Employees". These three trains were:

- 1P54; the 23:45 London Euston to Barrow-in-Furness InterCity Sleeper train (which had overtaken the stranded 1S26 at Kings Langley). The train was approaching Nuneaton at about 1:12 AM and according to its driver, Ireson, he had seen the Down Fast warning board but only its horizontal lights were illuminated, the 20 on the board was not, and slowed down and passed through the speed restriction, he failed to inform the staff at Crewe that the lights were out on the speed restriction warning board, despite being aware of Rule T25.5.
- 1S15; the 23:30 London Kensington Olympia to Stirling Motorail. According to its driver, Sharpes, the train had left on time but was delayed by the fact that it was pulled by a Class 50 locomotive which was underpowered. The train passed the speed restriction board at around 1:40 AM, during which he did not see the warning board, being only able to gain a glimpse of it and notifying his secondman that the lights were out and slowed down for the speed restriction, knowing that it would be there for a long time. The train did not stop at Nuneaton as it should have according to Rule T25.5 and continued towards Crewe, where the driver and secondman saw the breakdown train [sic] come out, only then realizing what had happened.
- 6F72; the 22:20 Willesden to Runcorn freight train, made up of 29 oil tanker wagons limited to 45 mph (72 km/h). According to its driver, Turner, the train passed the warning board at 1:45 AM, and in the initial inquiry claimed that the lights had been illuminated; however, he retracted his testimony in January 1976 and instead claimed to have been looking for his hand lamp, therefore having had no clear view of the track ahead of him.

Following these three trains was the delayed 1S26 which was fast approaching Nuneaton at 90 mph (145 km/h).

=== The crash ===
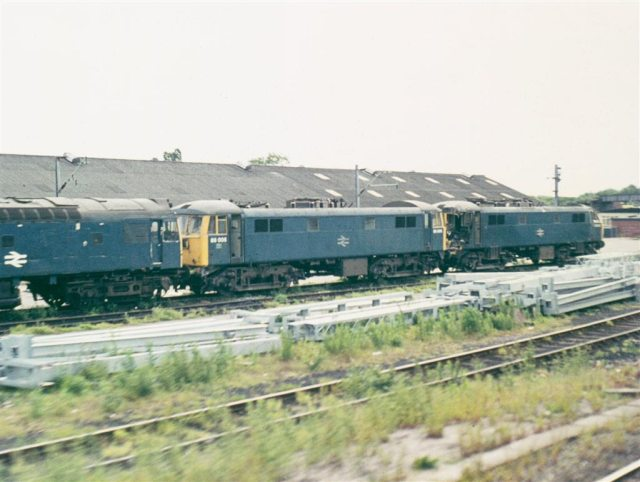
The damaged locomotives are seen on 16 June 1975 at Crewe Electric TMD

Near the site of the former Bulkington railway station, the train began its descent towards Nuneaton, and as such McKay began powering down the locomotive and lightly applying the brakes in order to not go over the train's assigned speed, by the time he had reached the long left-hand curve where the Down Fast warning board was located, the train was travelling at 80 mph (129 km/h). As he was looking out for the warning board on the Down Fast line, he saw Signal NN82 (displaying a green aspect) and the warning board for the Down Slow line, but not the one for the Down Fast line. Despite having driven the previous night through Nuneaton and having noticed the nature of the construction in the area and believing it would be long before the restrictions would be lifted, McKay assumed in the heat of the moment that the speed restriction had been lifted and released the train's brake, having been convinced that the warning board had been removed, claiming he had not seen its outline either. The decision was rooted in the fact that the Weekly Engineers Notice that began on 24 May had expired on 6 June at 0:01 AM, and thought that the engineers had completed their work and lifted the restriction; additionally he had not received the notice covering the period between 7 June and 13 June and he was preoccupied with minimising the train's delay that had been the result of the (now) trailing locomotive's breakdown at Kings Langley.

Just before entering the station from the East, McKay and Norman both saw the speed restriction commencement board and the emergency brakes were applied, but with little effect, as the train had entered the restriction area at 80 mph (129 km/h), four times over the speed limit that was in place, at around 1:54 AM. Seconds after this, the leading locomotive (86006) left the rails and burst the track, tripping all circuits in the Nuneaton signal box (and showing all tracks as occupied), before eventually grinding to a halt halfway though the station between the platforms receiving little damage. However, the trailing locomotive (86242) became separated as the chain couplers broke; the locomotive then mounted the platform and became jammed in the station's roof, causing severe damage to the front cab; it was also struck from behind by the first brake van, also causing damage to the rear cab.

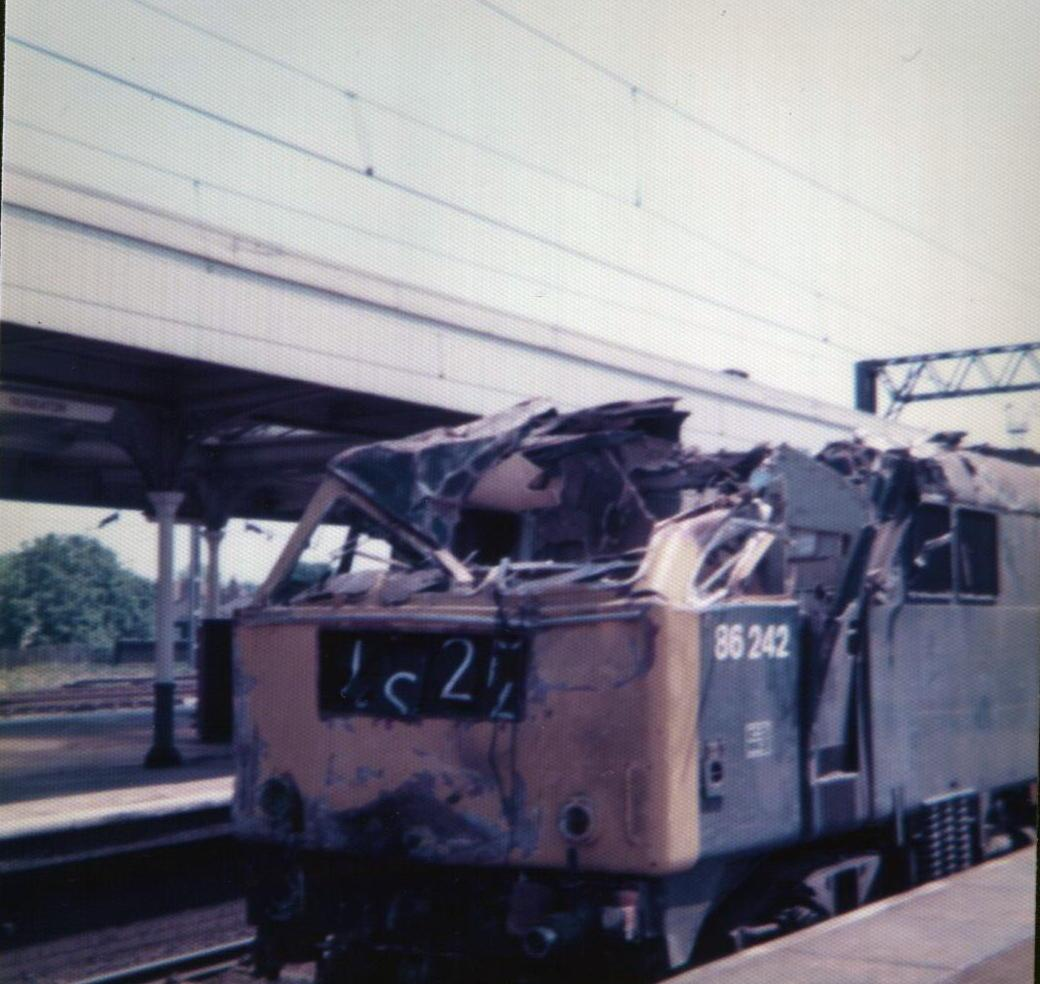
The heavily damaged 86242 after having been put back on the rails

The first three carriages then travelled over what was left of the temporary track and zig-zagged as they kept moving, the first two carriages remained upright but were significantly damaged as they derailed, with the first car being jammed against the platform's end. The third carriage then fell over to its sides, as did the fourth and fifth carriage, which were badly crushed during the derailment. The sixth carriage also fell to its sides but it wasn't uncoupled from the carriages behind it, which more or less stayed upright and in line with the leading locomotive; the last carriage, the second brake van on the train was sitting on the rails and was at the spot where the leading locomotive had burst the tracks. The accident had been witnessed by the signalmen on duty during the night at the Nuneaton signal box, who saw the train approaching faster than usual on their line diagram, before seeing it come barrelling down towards the restriction area in front of them, deralining and causing flashing from electric arcs between the overhead line and the pantograph. The time of derailment showing 1:54 AM was further corroborated by the Electrical Control Room recording a traction current isolation at that time, the power outage occurring due to the damage to the OHLE equipment. The driver of a nearby goods train, Ram Patel, also witnessed the accident and described how "the sky suddenly lit up and there was a tremendous noise", with debris and cables shattering against the locomotive (25286)'s windscreen, before heading for the engine room; his train was only doing 10 mph (16 km/h) and was coming from the Coventry Colliery.

The crash led to 6 deaths in total: the first four happened during the derailment, when two passengers and two sleeping car attendants died as the carriages fell and were crushed during the derailment; another two passengers died at the hospital. Another 38 passengers were transported to the Manor Hospital in Nuneaton, where another 10 had to stay for much longer due to serious injuries. Among the passengers was Minister for Agriculture Fred Peart, who would survive the crash with minor injuries, stumbling from the wreckeage in bare feet and walking together with the wounded towards the hospital The emergency services were quick to react with the first rescue crews to arrive on site having come just six minutes after the signalmen noticed the derailment. The rescue efforts were also assisted by members of the Women's Royal Voluntary Service, the Salvation Army and nearby residents. The inquiry noted that casualties would have been much higher if not for the lightly loaded nature of the train (there were fewer than 100 passengers on board); the fatalities and most injuries on board the train were in the carriages that had been the most badly damaged by falling over and being crushed. One of the rescuers described how parts of the train was crumpled "like crushed cigarette packs or squashed tin cans".

Over 455 yards (416 metres) of the Down Fast track was destroyed along with 175 yards (160 metres) of the Down Slow line next to it and 150 yards (140 metres) of the Down Fast line's platform. Other destroyed structures include three lineside electrification gantries, as well as severe damage to the A444 road's overhead bridge (although not enough to endanger it structurally), numerous items of trackside equipment (signals, point machines and motors and lineside telephones), and the locomotive of the passing goods train (Class 25 number 25286), which was damaged by falling overhead line equipment.

The Trent Valley line was blocked for 4 days, and during this time most of the through traffic was redirected via Birmingham, with DMUs conducting a shuttle service between Coventry and Polesworth. After the wreckage was cleared up, the Slow lines reopened on 10 June at 22:00, whereas the Fast lines only reopened on 12 June at 14:00, after electric traction had been restored.

== Aftermath ==
=== The inquiry ===
The inquiry, conducted by Major C. F. Rose, found the crash to be due to the following causes:

- The advance warning board was not illuminated because the gas lighting equipment had been set up incorrectly, and had gone out some time between 01:10 and 01:40. The lights had gone out because the gas cylinder supplying it had run empty; the equipment had two gas cylinders, and included a valve which would allow the gas supply to automatically switch from one cylinder to the other when one was empty, but this valve was not being used.
- A number of drivers on preceding trains noticed that the lights had gone out, but did not stop and report it as they should have done according to the rules.
- The driver of the train before driver McKay’s train claimed that the warning board was fully lit, but he later told the inquiry that he thought he had forgotten his hand lamp and was looking for it in his bag when he passed the warning board and did not see the condition of the lamps.
- Although driver McKay claimed that he believed the speed restriction had been lifted when he did not see the warning board, the inquiry considered this unlikely, and noted that he had driven a train over the same stretch of track the previous night, and had seen the extent of the work being done. He also would have known that the restriction would not have been lifted without notice, and if it had been lifted early, the rules required the Civil Engineers to show the new permissible speed limit at the warning board, and they would not have removed the board completely and without warning. Instead, it was thought likely that McKay, in his haste to make up time following the earlier delay, temporarily forgot about the speed restriction without the reminder of the warning board during the vital few minutes in which the train passed the area.

McKay was later charged with manslaughter but found not guilty after a three-day trial the following year in June.

A number of recommendations to prevent a recurrence of the accident were accepted by the British Railways Board, the main one being the installation of temporary Automatic Warning System magnets at speed restriction locations to ensure that drivers were given audible and visual notice of speed restrictions.

=== Memorial ===
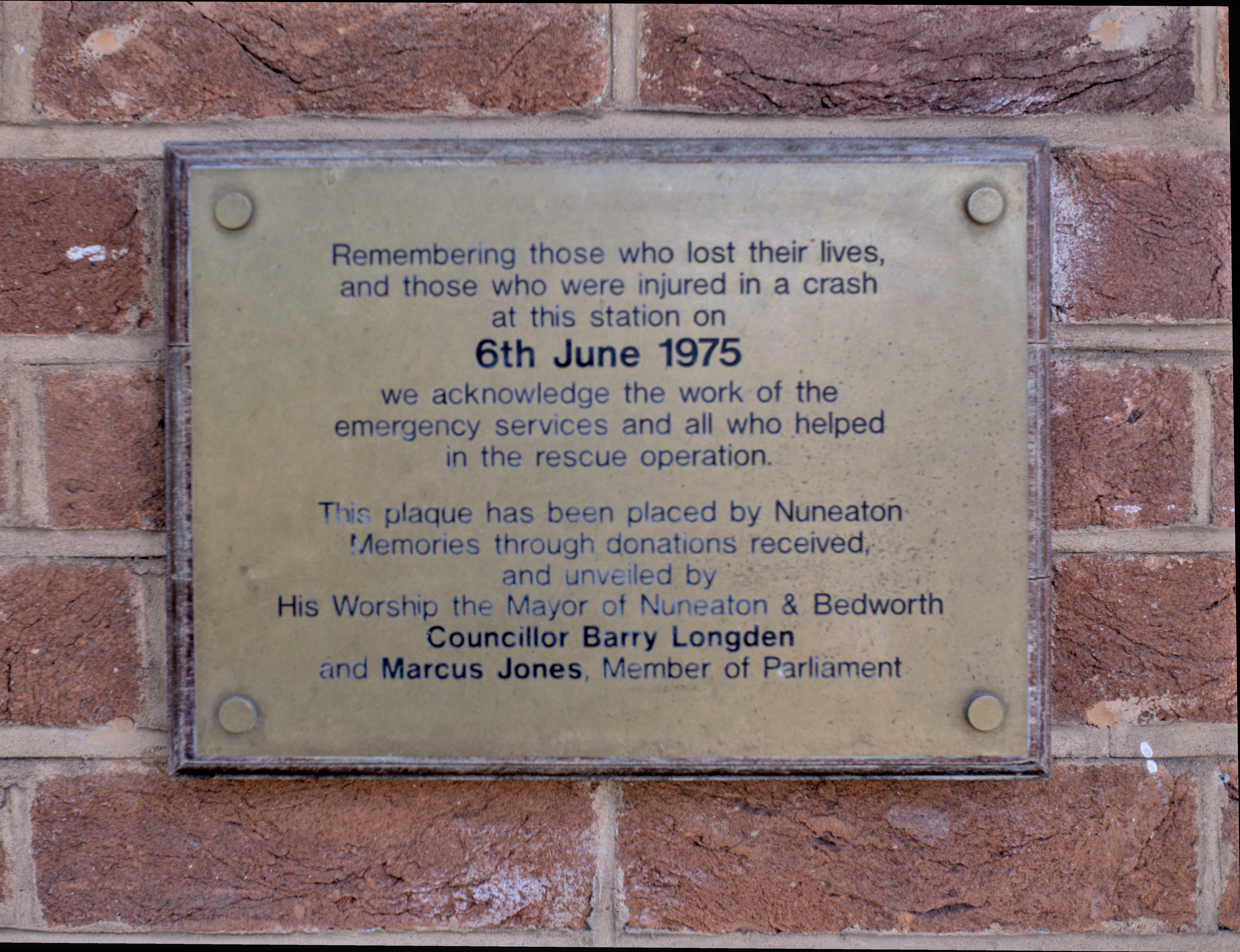
Memorial plaque

A plaque commemorating the victims of the crash, as well as the actions of emergency services personnel, was unveiled at Nuneaton station in August 2015, in the presence of Mayor Barry Longden and Marcus Jones MP, after a fundraising process meant to commemorate the events. Aside from this, the only other reminder of the crash were the shortened Down Fast line platforms, which were never fully repaired after being damaged in the crash.

Most of the carriages that were damaged in the crash had to be cut up on site. Only one of the Class 86 locomotives involved in the crash is still in service, 86242 had been in use on the British railway network until October 2004, with its last allocation on the Great Eastern Main Line between London Liverpool Street and Norwich. In 2013 it was sold to Floyd ZRt. of Hungary and was renumbered to 0450 008-2 for use on freight trains. The other locomotive, 86006 was renumbered to 86406 to be used on InterCity trains before being last operated by Freightliner Ltd, retired in November 2003 and scrapped in June 2007 in Rotherham, South Yorkshire.

== See also ==
Hoofddorp train accident, 1992, the Netherlands: two different trains oversped over temporary tracks with speed restrictions due to the drivers failing to notice the speed restriction in time. In the case of the second accident, 5 people were killed.
