= 1996 Maryland train collision =

Fatal train crash in the United States

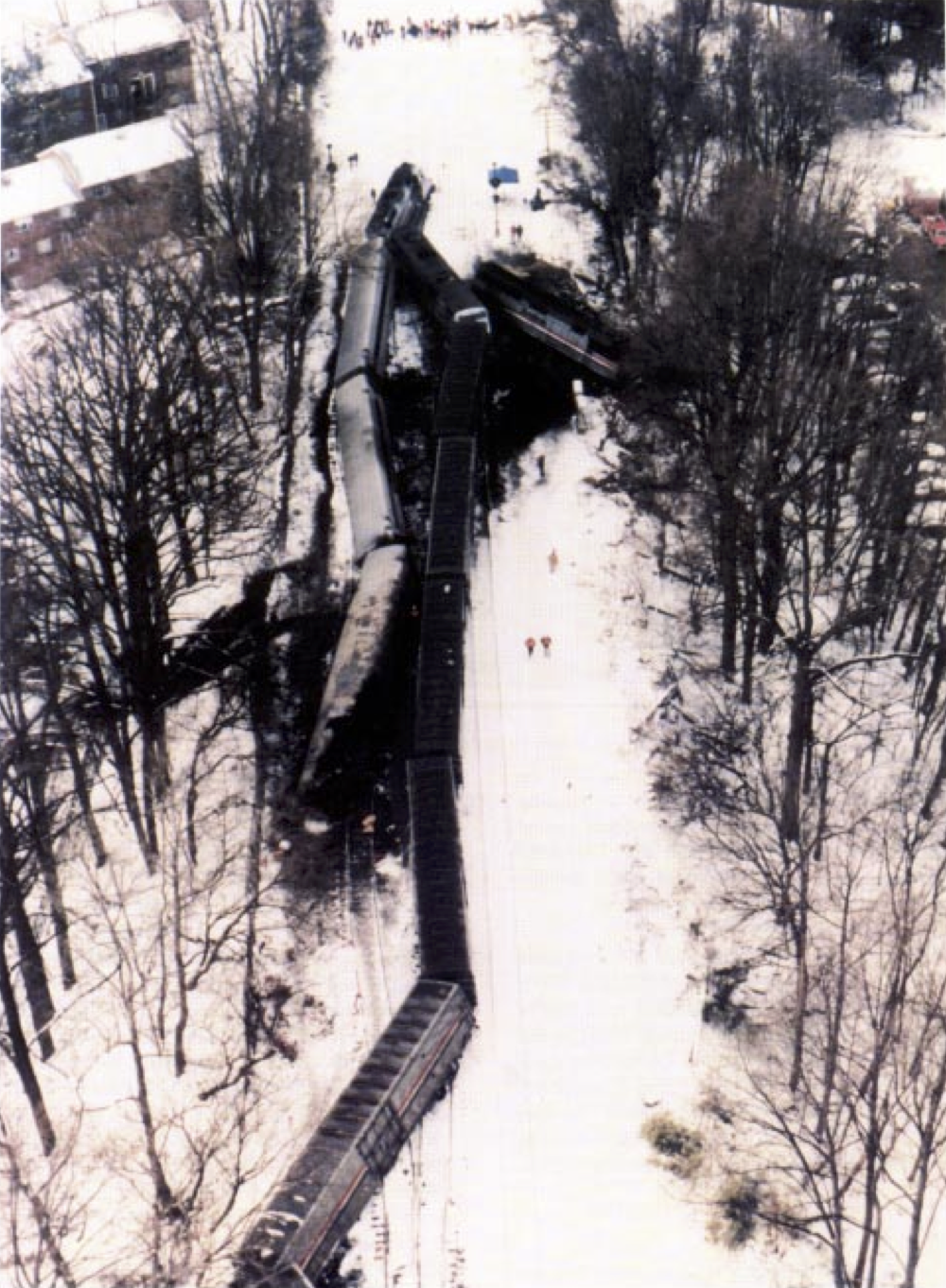
- Aerial photograph of the collision. The MARC commuter train is on the left, and the Capitol Limited is on the right.

Details
- Date: February 16, 1996; 30 years ago 5:39 pm
- Location: Silver Spring, Maryland, U.S.
- Coordinates: 39.0008°N 77.0423°W
- Country: United States
- Operator: MARC; Amtrak
- Incident type: Collision
- Cause: Signal passed at danger due to driver error of the MARC train, having forgotten to comply with the requirements of an approach signal.

Statistics
- Trains: 2
- Passengers: 184
- Deaths: 11
- Injured: 26

On February 16, 1996, a MARC commuter train collided with Amtrak's Capitol Limited passenger train in Silver Spring, Maryland, United States, killing three crew and eight passengers on the MARC train; a further eleven passengers on the same train and fifteen passengers and crew on the Capitol Limited were injured. Total damage was estimated at $7.5 million.

An investigation by the National Transportation Safety Board (NTSB) found that the crew of the MARC train had, for unknown reasons, failed to obey the indication of an approach signal which they had passed before a station stop, and as a consequence, could not slow down in time after encountering a stop signal.

The crash led to the creation of comprehensive federal rules for passenger car design, the first in the history of passenger service in the U.S., as well as changes to operating rules.

== Accident ==
The two-track railroad line between Brunswick, Maryland, and Union Station in Washington, D.C., is owned by CSX Transportation (save for approaches to Union Station) and is known as the Metropolitan Subdivision. MARC operates commuter services, known as the Brunswick Line, from Washington to Brunswick and points west. Amtrak operates the single daily Capitol Limited, a Washington–Chicago overnight train, over the route as well, though it makes fewer stops.

MARC No. 286 departed Brunswick at 4:30 p.m. Eastern time on February 16, 1996, traveling eastbound. No. 286 was a Brunswick–Washington, D.C., commuter train with a scheduled arrival at Union Station of 5:30 pm. The National Transportation Safety Board (NTSB) described the conditions that day as a "blowing snowfall", with a 5-inch (130 mm) accumulation. At the time, CSX provided the operating crew for MARC commuter trains under contract to the Maryland Mass Transit Administration; aboard were an engineer, conductor, and assistant conductor. The train consisted of EMD GP39H-2 diesel locomotive number 73, two passenger coaches, and cab control car no. 7752. The train operated in push mode, meaning that the locomotive was on the rear of the train, and the locomotive engineer controlled operations from the control car in the front. MARC No. 286 had twenty passengers on board.

Amtrak No. 29, the Capitol Limited, departed Union Station at 5:25 pm, traveling westbound towards Chicago. That day the Amtrak train consisted of two diesel locomotives, an EMD F40PHR, no. 255, leading and a GE P40DC, no. 811, trailing; six material handling cars; a baggage car; a Superliner transition sleeping car; two Superliner sleeping cars; a Superliner dining car; a Superliner Sightseer Lounge car; two Superliner coaches; and a Hi-Level dormitory-coach. The Capitol Limited had four crew, fourteen service personnel, and 164 passengers on board.

Collision damage

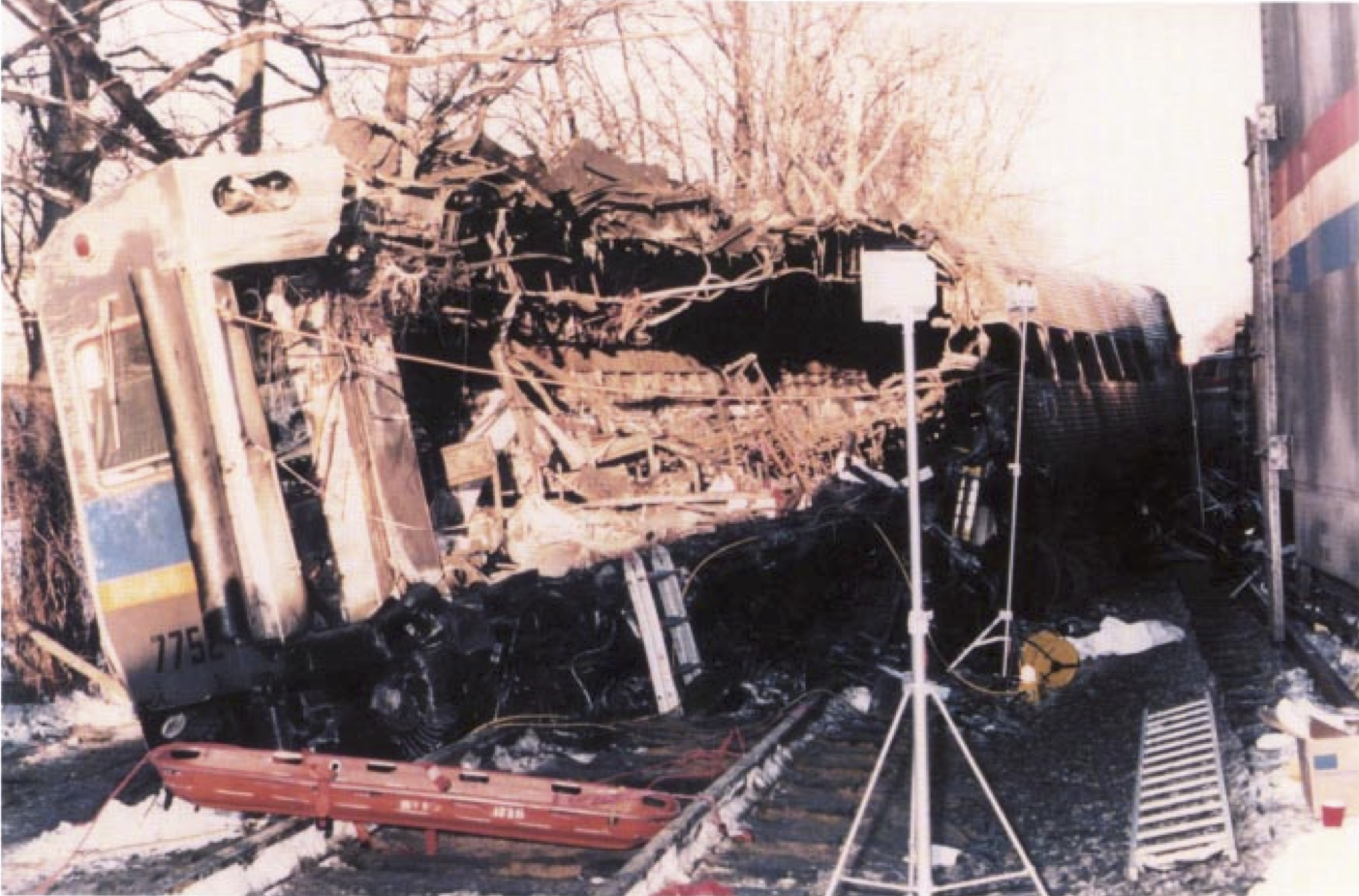
MARC II cab control car #7752

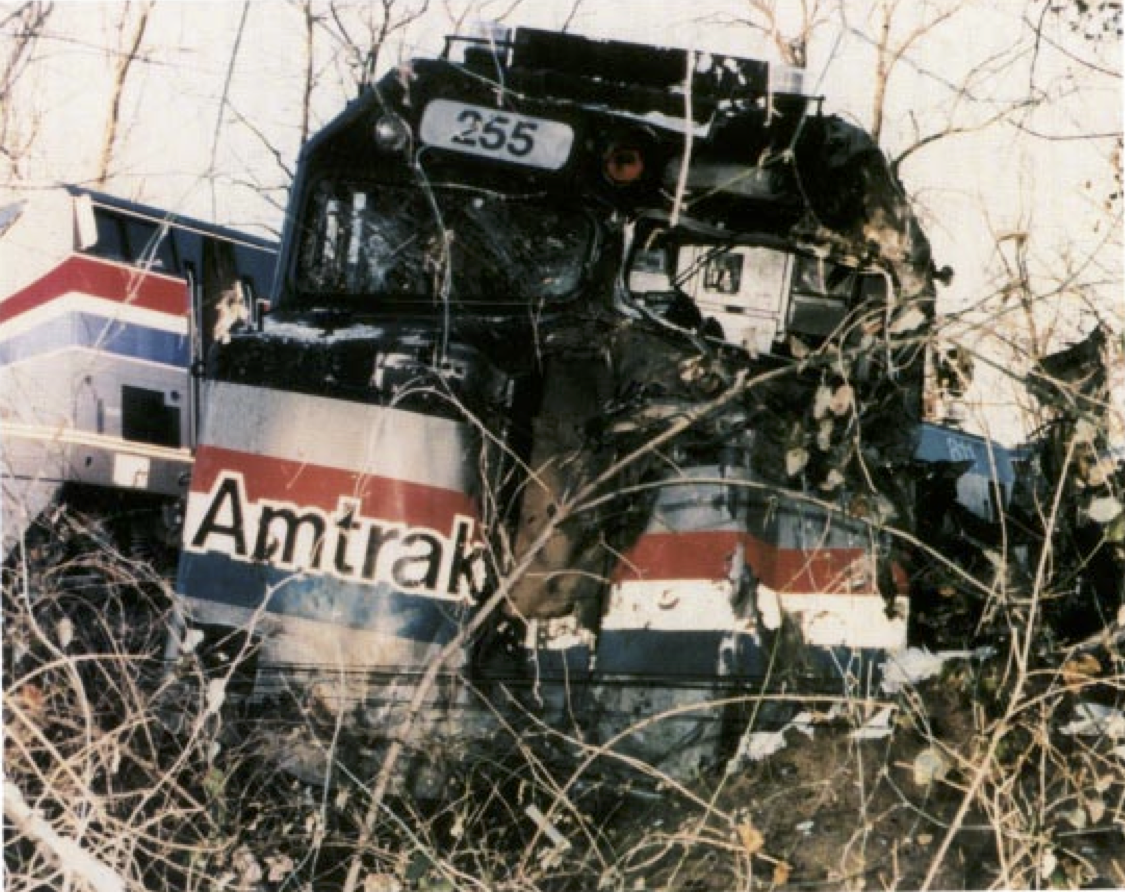
Amtrak EMD F40PHR No. 255

The two tracks of the Metropolitan Subdivision are numbered 1 and 2. MARC No. 286 was on track 2, having made a flag stop at Kensington to pick up two passengers. The Capitol Limited was also on track 2, having passed a stopped freight train on track 1. Both trains were approaching Georgetown Junction, where the Capitol Limited was to switch to track 1. The signal protecting Georgetown Junction indicated "stop" on track 2, which would have the effect of stopping MARC No. 286 and permitting the Capitol Limited to change tracks. Before reaching Kensington, MARC No. 286 passed an approach signal. The purpose of that signal was to warn the train's crew that the next signal would be a stop signal and that maximum speed was restricted to 30 miles per hour (48 km/h). For reasons unknown, the crew of MARC No. 286 did not obey this restriction, and, after departing Kensington, the train reached 66 miles per hour (106 km/h) before the crew applied the emergency brakes. The Capitol Limited had reached Georgetown Junction and begun crossing over to track 1. MARC No. 286 struck the Amtrak train at approximately 38 miles per hour (61 km/h) at 5:39 pm.

All three crew members aboard the MARC train were killed, along with eight passengers. Twenty-six people were injured. The collision destroyed both MARC passenger cars, the control car, and one of the two Amtrak locomotives, EMD F40PHR No. 255. The turnouts at Georgetown Junction were damaged and had to be replaced. The total property damage was estimated at $7.5 million.

== Investigation ==
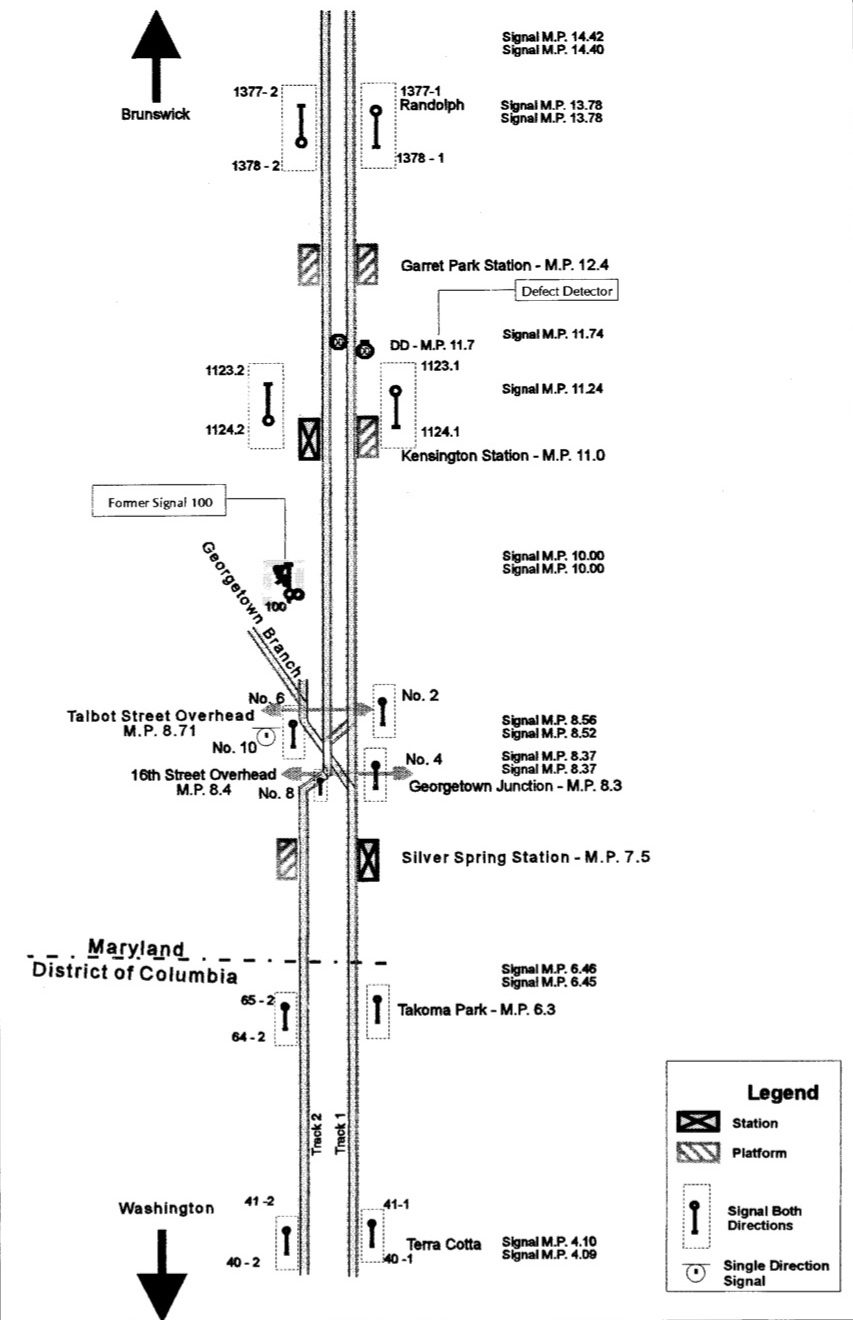
Track diagram of the collision area

It was clear from the outset that MARC No. 286 had not complied with the speed restrictions of the approach signal and consequently overran the stop signal, making the crash inevitable. The deaths of all three MARC crew members in the collision meant that the reason for the failure would remain unknown; in its report, NTSB ascribed it to "the apparent failure of the engineer and the train crew because of multiple distractions to operate MARC train 286." The focus of the investigators and the public shifted to safety systems that could have prevented the crash and the design of the commuter rail cars themselves.

One of the crew members and seven of the eight MARC passengers who died were killed not by the collision itself but by a fire that started when the exposed diesel fuel tanks on the Amtrak locomotive ruptured. Emergency responders were unable to open the doors of the lead passenger car. Passengers in other cars reported trying to break the window glass but being unable to do so. The NTSB found the existing emergency egress standards for passenger cars were inadequate and recommended multiple changes, including:

- that passenger cars be required to have "quick release" mechanisms for exterior doors
- that passenger car windows be removable in the event of an emergency
- that emergency exits be marked with "luminescent or retroreflective material"

Before the NTSB issued its report, MARC had taken steps in that direction, including installing more emergency windows, improving door release mechanisms, and improving emergency signage.

Much criticism focused on the role of human error in the collision; once the engineer had forgotten (or missed) the approach signal, there was no automatic system to prevent the collision. The NTSB noted that had a positive train control system been in place on the Metropolitan Subdivision, the collision would have been less likely: the system would have detected MARC #286's unauthorized speed and stopped the train. The NTSB also strongly criticized CSX and the Federal Transit Administration for the removal of a signal between Kensington and Georgetown Junction as part of capacity improvements on the Metropolitan Subdivision. The NTSB argued that having this signal after Kensington would have reduced the likelihood of the sort of human error that caused the crash, and in the NTSB's view, CSX and the FTA did not properly assess the effects of removing the signal.

== Aftermath ==
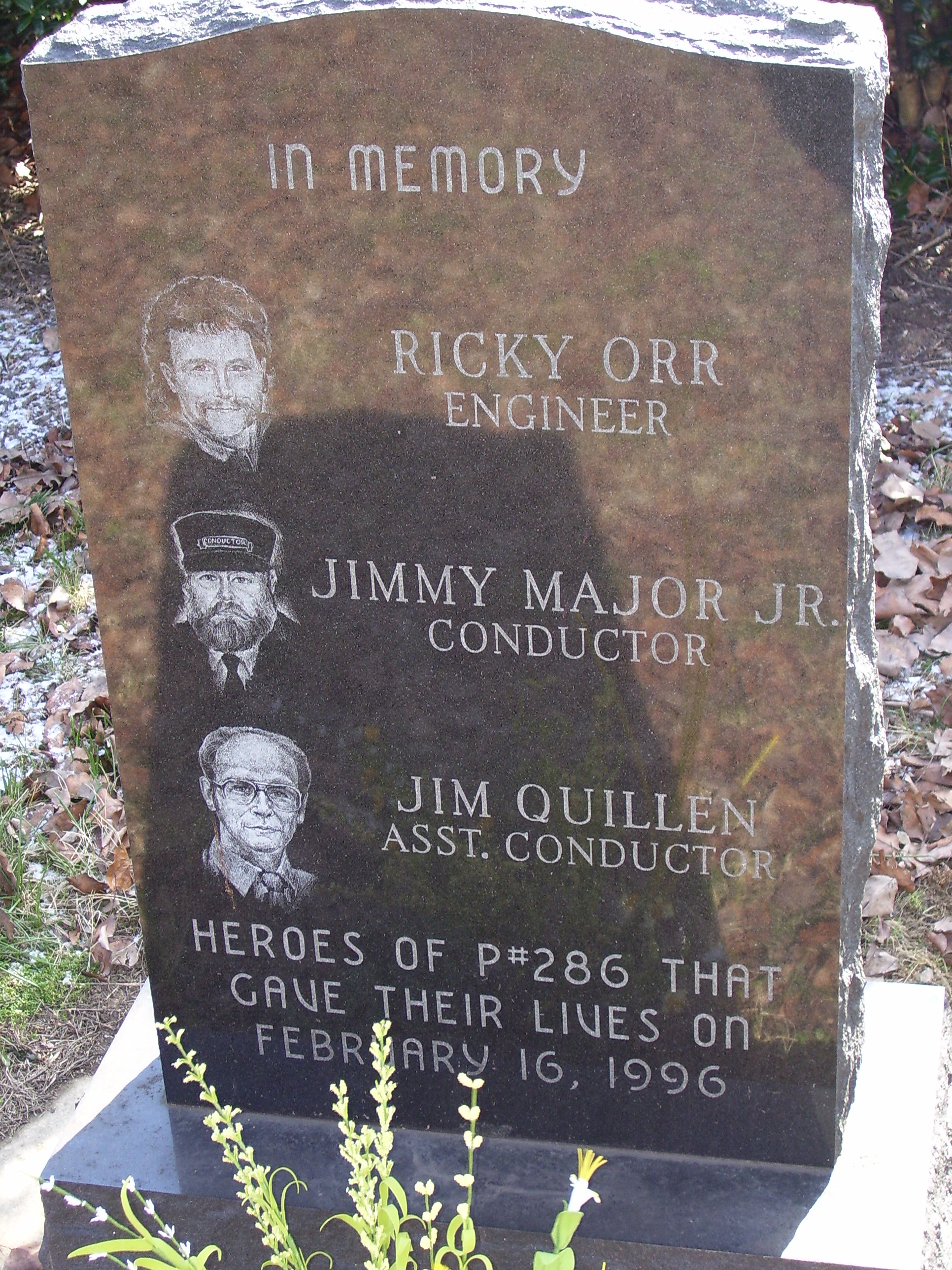
Crew fatalities

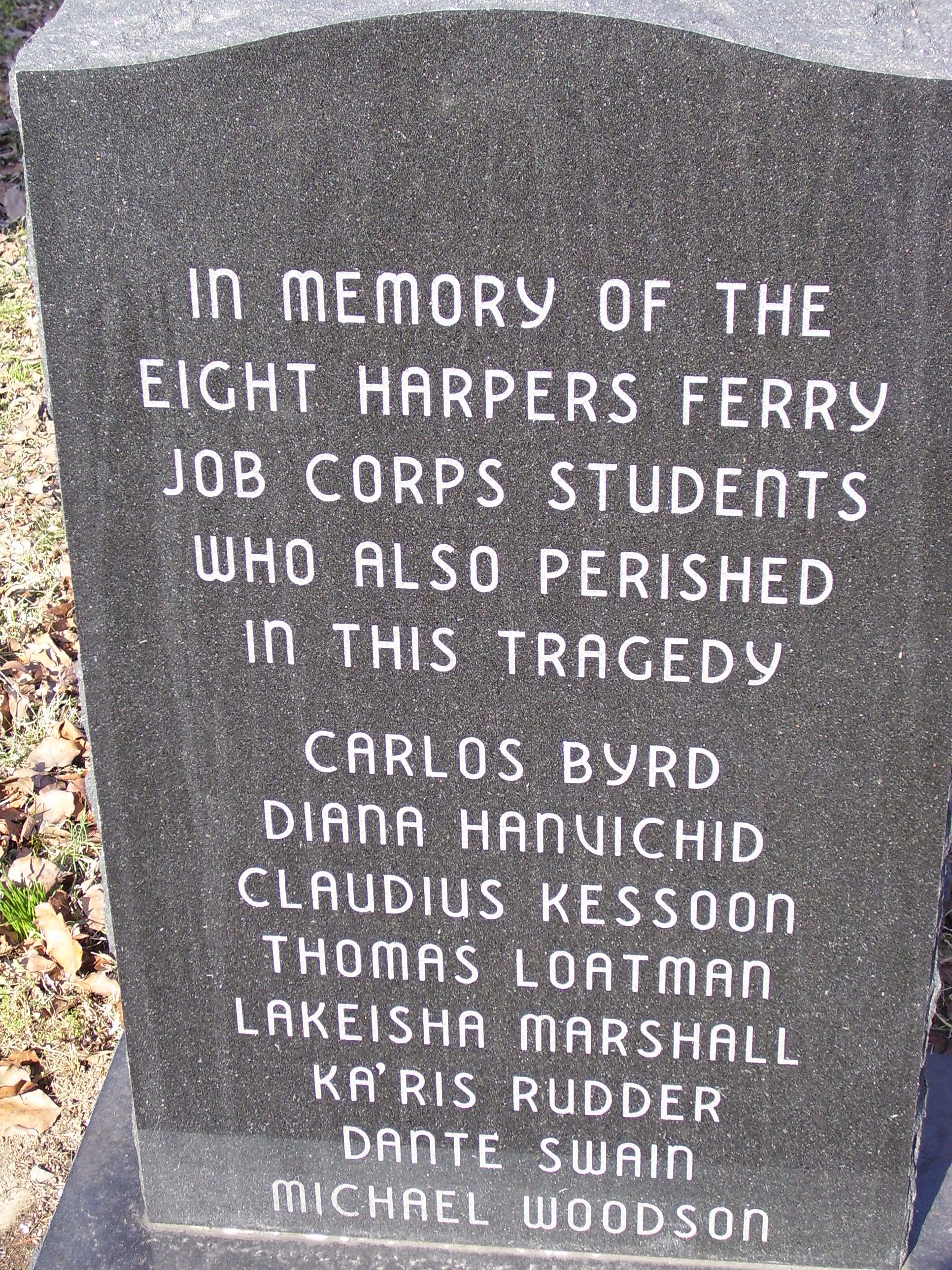
Passenger fatalities

Following the accident, the engineer and conductor of the Capitol Limited filed lawsuits against Amtrak, CSX, and the state of Maryland for $103 million (1996 USD) alleging negligence, singling out the removal of the signal between Kensington and Georgetown Junction and the operator error by the MARC engineer. Both men claimed that the injuries they sustained in the crash "prevent[ed] them from returning to work". In 1999, responding to the crash, the Federal Railroad Administration issued comprehensive rules for passenger car design, "the first ...in the 169-year history of rail passenger service". The new rules required new control cars and multiple units to be built to higher crashworthiness standards.

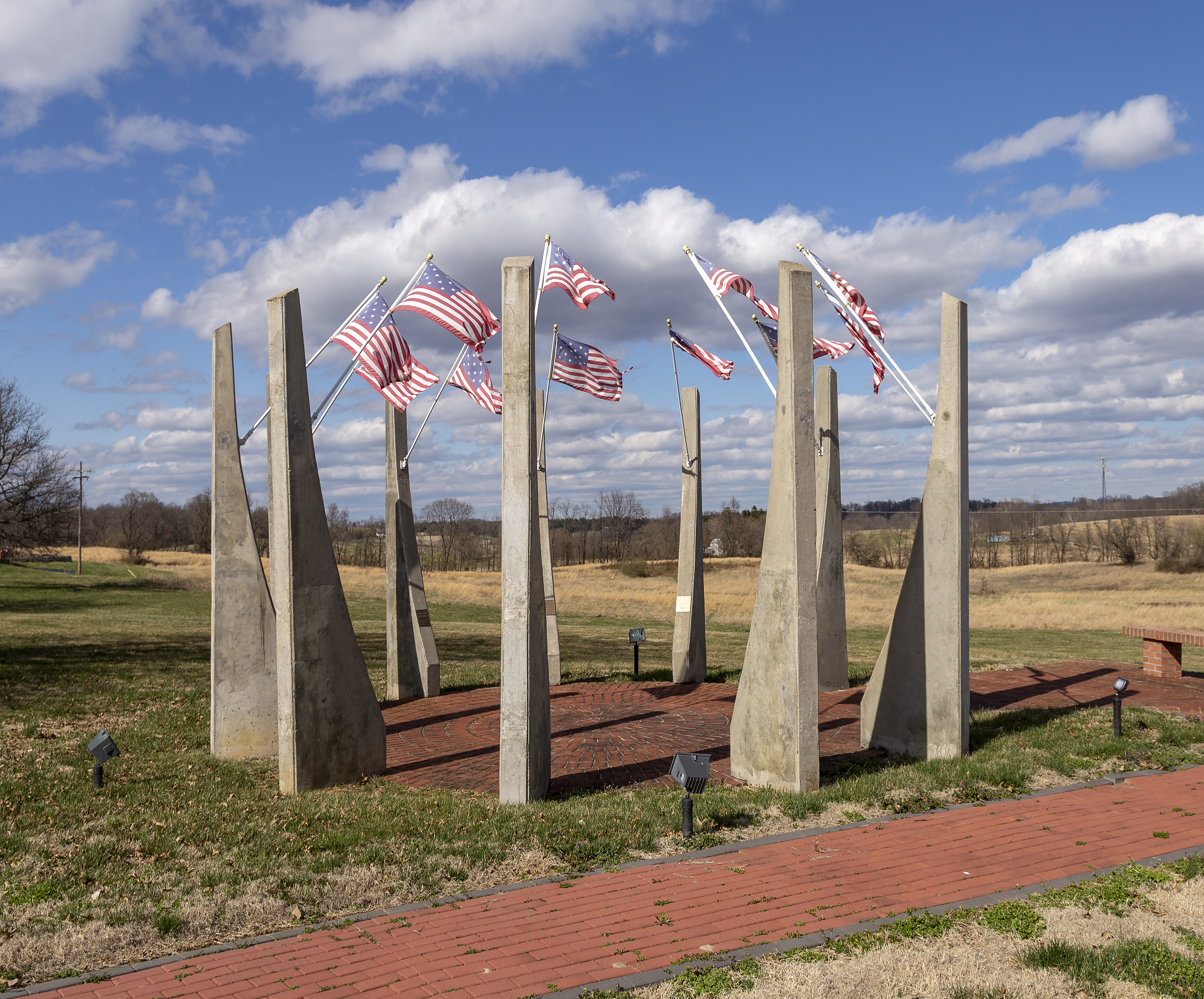
Memorial at the Harpers Ferry Job Corps Center

Several memorials were erected to commemorate the dead. In Silver Spring, a plaque was placed on a bridge above the crash site. In Brunswick, a stone is engraved with the names and pictures of the three CSX crew members. Private donations paid for the stone. The eight passengers who died were all students at the Harpers Ferry Job Corps Center. Students there erected a memorial flanked by weeping cherry trees. F40PHR 255 was taken to a yard for evidence, but it was eventually scrapped. MARC cab car 7752 was also scrapped and as well as the coaches. P40DC 811 was repaired and put back into service but was later put into storage in the mid-2010s and eventually scrapped in December 2025. MARC 73 was later returned to service and still operates today.

== See also ==
- 1987 Maryland train collision
- Rüsselsheim train disaster, a similar accident that occurred in West Germany in 1990
- List of rail accidents (1990–1999)
