= 1990 Back Bay, Massachusetts, train collision =

Collision of two trains in Boston

1990 Back Bay train collision
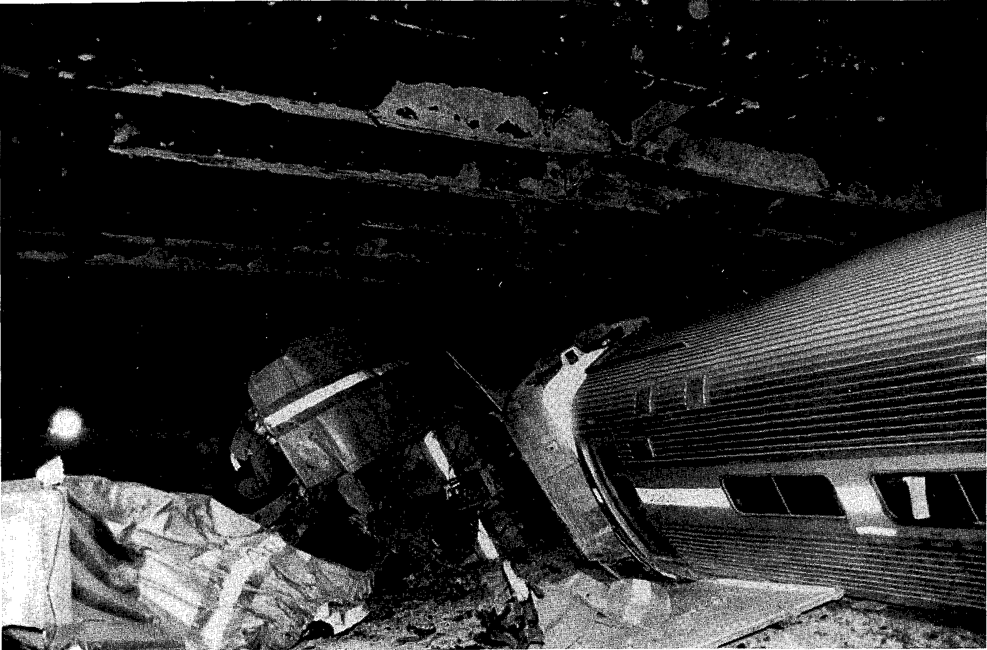
- A derailed Amfleet coach from the Night Owl

Details
- Date: December 12, 1990 (35 years ago); 8:23 AM
- Location: Back Bay, Boston, Massachusetts
- Coordinates: 42°20′50″N 71°04′32″W
- Country: U.S.
- Line: Northeast Corridor
- Operator: Amtrak; MBTA
- Incident type: Derailment and collision
- Cause: Excessive speed

Statistics
- Trains: 2
- Passengers: 1,102
- Deaths: 0
- Injured: 453
- Damage: $14 million

The 1990 Back Bay train collision was a collision between an Amtrak passenger train, the Night Owl, and a Massachusetts Bay Transportation Authority (MBTA) Stoughton Line commuter train just outside Back Bay station in Boston, Massachusetts, United States. An investigation by the National Transportation Safety Board (NTSB) found that the Amtrak train entered a speed-restricted curve at excessive speed, causing the train to derail and crash into the MBTA commuter train on an adjacent track. Although no one was killed in the accident, 453 people were injured and Back Bay station was closed for six days. Total damage was estimated at $14 million. The accident led to new speed restrictions and safety improvements in the vicinity of Back Bay and a revamp of Amtrak's locomotive engineer training program.

== Accident ==
Amtrak #66, the Night Owl, departed Union Station in Washington, D.C. at 10:30 PM on December 11, 1990. The Night Owl was Amtrak's overnight service on the Northeast Corridor and was scheduled to arrive at Boston's South Station at 8:35 AM on December 12. At the time, electrification ended at New Haven, Connecticut, so two EMD F40PH diesel locomotives (#272 & #366) were assigned to pull the Night Owl from New Haven to Boston. Behind the two locomotives were a material handling car, a baggage car, three coaches, a dining car, two sleeping cars, another baggage car, and another material handling car. As the train approached Back Bay, a scheduled stop, there were seven crew and 190 passengers aboard.

MBTA #906 was a regularly scheduled commuter train on the Stoughton Line, inbound from Stoughton to South Station. The train consisted of an EMD F40PH-2C diesel locomotive (#1073), similar to the Amtrak locomotives, six passenger coaches, and a control car. The train operated in push mode, meaning that the locomotive was on the rear of the train and the locomotive engineer controlled operations from the control car in the front. At the time of the accident, the commuter train was coming to a scheduled stop at Back Bay, and had five crew and 900 passengers aboard.

The western approach to Back Bay is a triple-tracked tunnel, with tracks numbered 3, 1, and 2. The MBTA train was on track 1 and the Night Owl on track 2. These two tracks are immediately adjacent with no barrier between them. At the time the maximum speed for all three tracks was 30 miles per hour (48 km/h). The lead Amtrak locomotive, #272, entered the curve into Back Bay at 76 miles per hour (122 km/h), more than twice the maximum authorized speed. At 8:23 AM the locomotive left the tracks and struck the MBTA locomotive on the adjacent track. As the collision occurred in downtown Boston, emergency medical services were on the scene almost immediately. The subsequent NTSB investigation reported 453 injuries: 50 on the Night Owl, 396 on the MBTA train, and seven firefighters who responded to the crash.

The collision destroyed all three locomotives, five Amtrak cars, and one MBTA coach. The tunnel suffered structural damage to its support columns. Dartmouth Street, immediately above the tunnel, had to be resurfaced: during the collision the two trains jackknifed and created a hole in the street. Back Bay was closed for six days after the accident. The total damage was estimated at $14 million, not including personal injury claims: $9 million in damage to infrastructure and rolling stock and a further $5 million in cleanup costs.

== Investigation ==
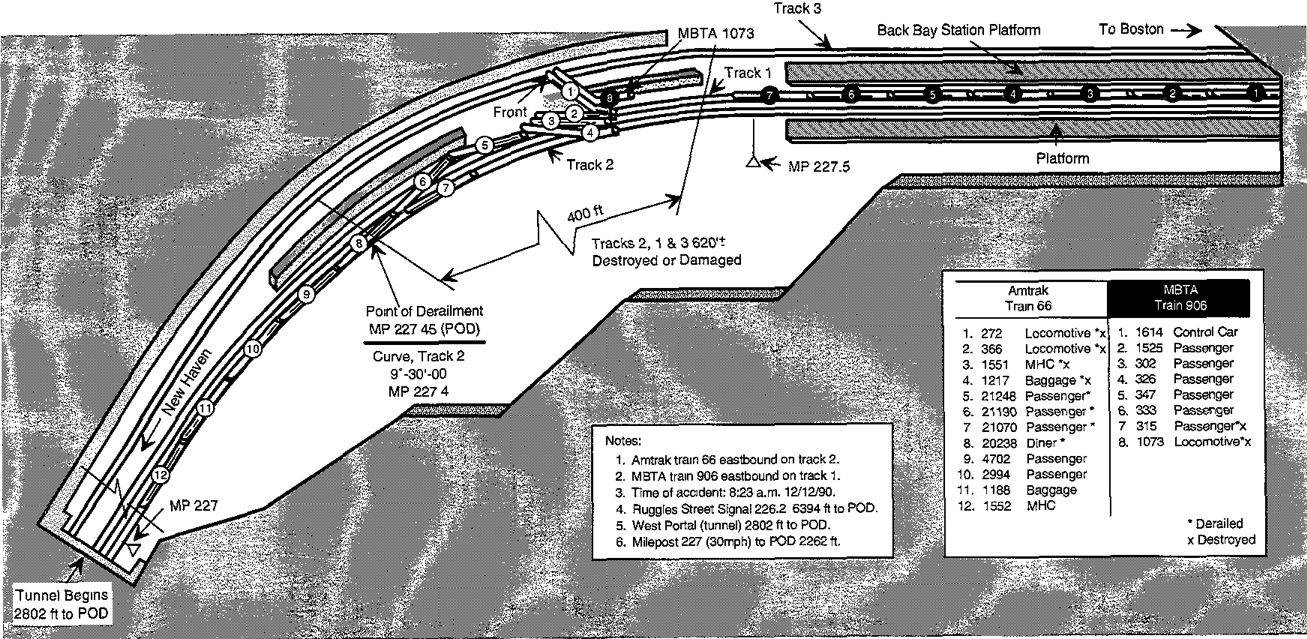
NTSB diagram showing the accident

The NTSB investigation focused on the operation of the Night Owl. Two crewmen had been in the cab of the lead locomotive: Willis E. Copeland, the engineer, and Richard Abramson, an apprentice engineer. Abramson was operating the locomotive under Copeland's supervision "for the entire trip."

Copeland had worked in the railroad industry since 1957 and as an engineer since 1969. As a road foreman for Amtrak in 1979, he ignored several stop signals and almost reached an open drawbridge at Pelham Bay. Only an automatic derailer prevented a more serious accident. Amtrak fired Copeland over the incident, but he was rehired in 1983. In March 1990 the Metro-North Railroad banned Copeland from its territory for life (with the exception of its trackage within New Haven Union Station) after "twice running through temporary stop signs set up to protect railroad employees working on an adjacent tracks." Abramson had joined Amtrak as a ticket clerk in 1973 and entered the engineer training program in early 1990. He had made two round-trips over the territory as part of his training program. Copeland was personally acquainted with Abramson but had supervised other apprentice engineers.

Review of the train event recorder showed that the Night Owl had exceeded the maximum authorized speed of 100 miles per hour (160 km/h), apparently to make up for lost time between New Haven and Boston. Copeland claimed that he instructed Abramson to begin braking at Ruggles station, approximately 1 mile (1.6 km) from Back Bay, that the train failed to slow normally upon brake application, and that emergency braking was applied before the train entered the tunnel. Data from the recorder did not substantiate this (braking was not initiated until shortly before the train entered the tunnel, and emergency braking a mere 480 feet (150 m) - less than four seconds of travel time - before reaching the point of derailment), and in the view of the NTSB even if the Night Owl had begun braking at that point it would still have been going too fast when it reached the curve. Any speed over 59 miles per hour (95 km/h) would have led to the derailment and subsequent collision. When it entered the Back Bay tunnel, the Night Owl was still traveling at 103 miles per hour (166 km/h), and slowed only to 76 miles per hour (122 km/h) before the recorder ceased to function.

Given the involvement of Abramson, the NTSB reviewed Amtrak's locomotive engineer training program and pinpointed several areas for improvement:

- Abramson was learning the New Haven–Boston route ("physical characteristics familiarization") even as he was learning to operate the locomotive itself.
- Locomotive engineers who were to supervise apprentices did not receive special training or instruction for that task. The NTSB raised particular concerns about Copeland serving in the role given his service record.

== Aftermath ==
The NTSB found that Amtrak was entirely at fault for the accident and that the "probable cause" was Abramson's failure to brake in time and Copeland's failure to supervise him properly. The NTSB also faulted Amtrak's supervision of its engineer training program and the lack of warning devices at the curve. The NTSB later amended its findings to remove specific reference to Abramson; the amended probable cause blamed Copeland for failing to properly supervise and ensure the train was braked in time. Amtrak fired both Abramson and Copeland. By 1992, Amtrak had installed automatic warning devices which would brake a train approaching the curve too fast.

== See also ==
- List of rail accidents (1990–1999)
