= Hoofddorp train accident =

1992 railway incident in the Netherlands

Coordinates: 52°17′19″N 4°41′21″E

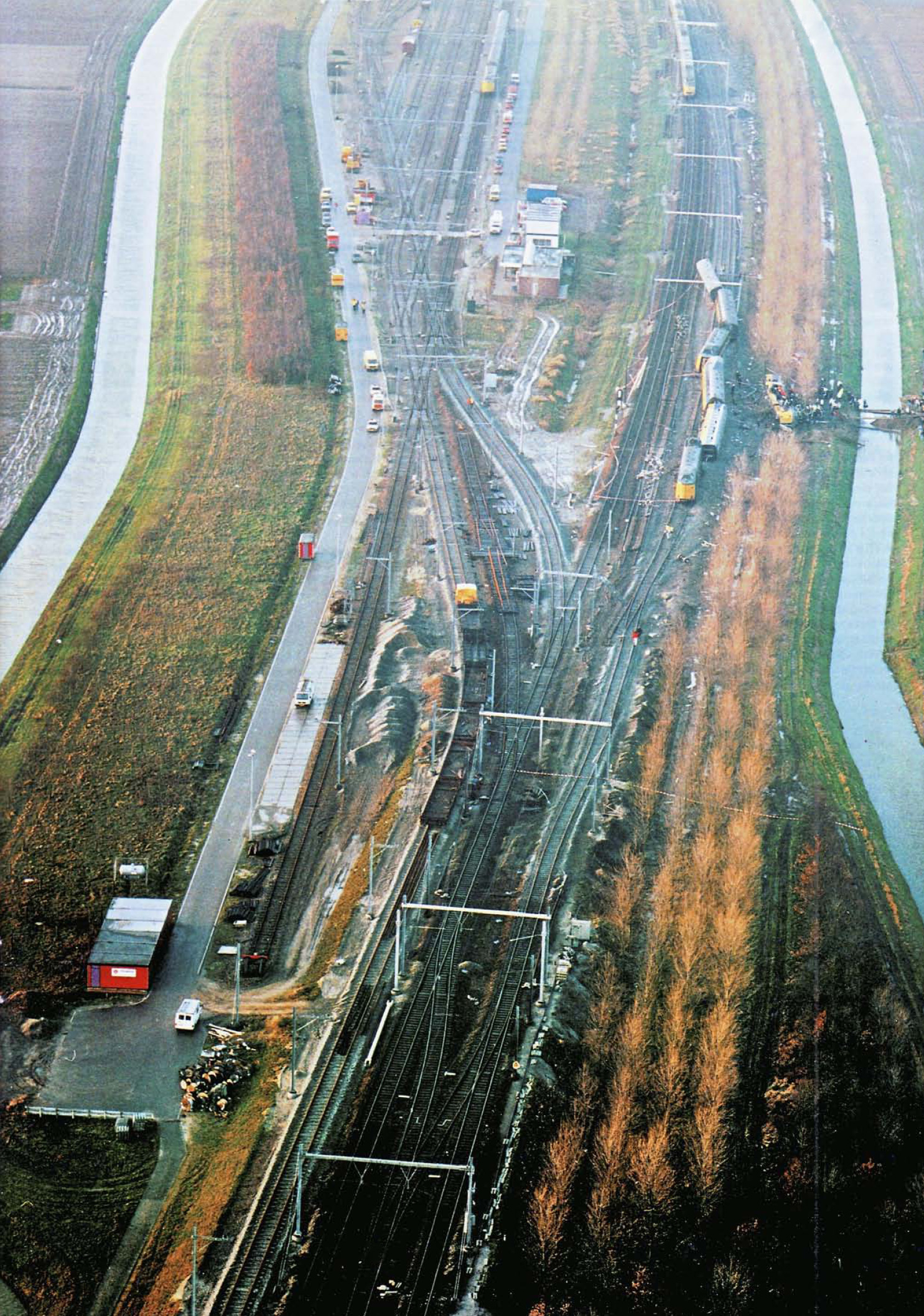
- Aftermath of the Hoofddorp train accident. Notice the track reconstruction in the area.

Details
- Date: 30 November 1992; 07:15
- Location: Near Hoofddorp
- Country: Netherlands
- Operator: Nederlandse Spoorwegen
- Cause: High speed due to insufficient communication with operator.

Statistics
- Deaths: 5
- Injured: 33

The Hoofddorp train accident in the Dutch municipality Haarlemmermeer took place on 30 November 1992. Whilst en route to Vlissingen, a Koploper-type passenger train derailed at about 7:15 near Hoofddorp. Five people were killed and 33 were injured in the accident. Two days earlier, an international train from Amsterdam to Paris had derailed at nearly the same location.

== Cause ==
=== Background ===
During November 1992, Hoofddorp train station was undergoing reconstruction, especially the southern section that was being remodelled due to the extension of the railway yards in the area. For some time, an S-turn was required on a part of the route. For the construction of this, a tamping machine came to Hoofddorp to construct this S-bend, suitable for 90 km/h. However, the tamping machine quickly became defective and the workers were required to build the curve with other materials. This meant that the arc jets were made tighter with this replacement material, with sharper bends and consequently a lower maximum speed. The work was completed by early Monday morning, the bypass S-curve being opened at a speed of 90 km/h.

On 23 November 1992, the speed of 90 km/h turned out to be too high for this track section. After six trains passed the S-curve, with very sharp vibration, the dispatcher was asked by its superiors to apply a speed restriction of 30 km/h at 8:26 a.m. Further inspection added a speed increase to 60 km/h.

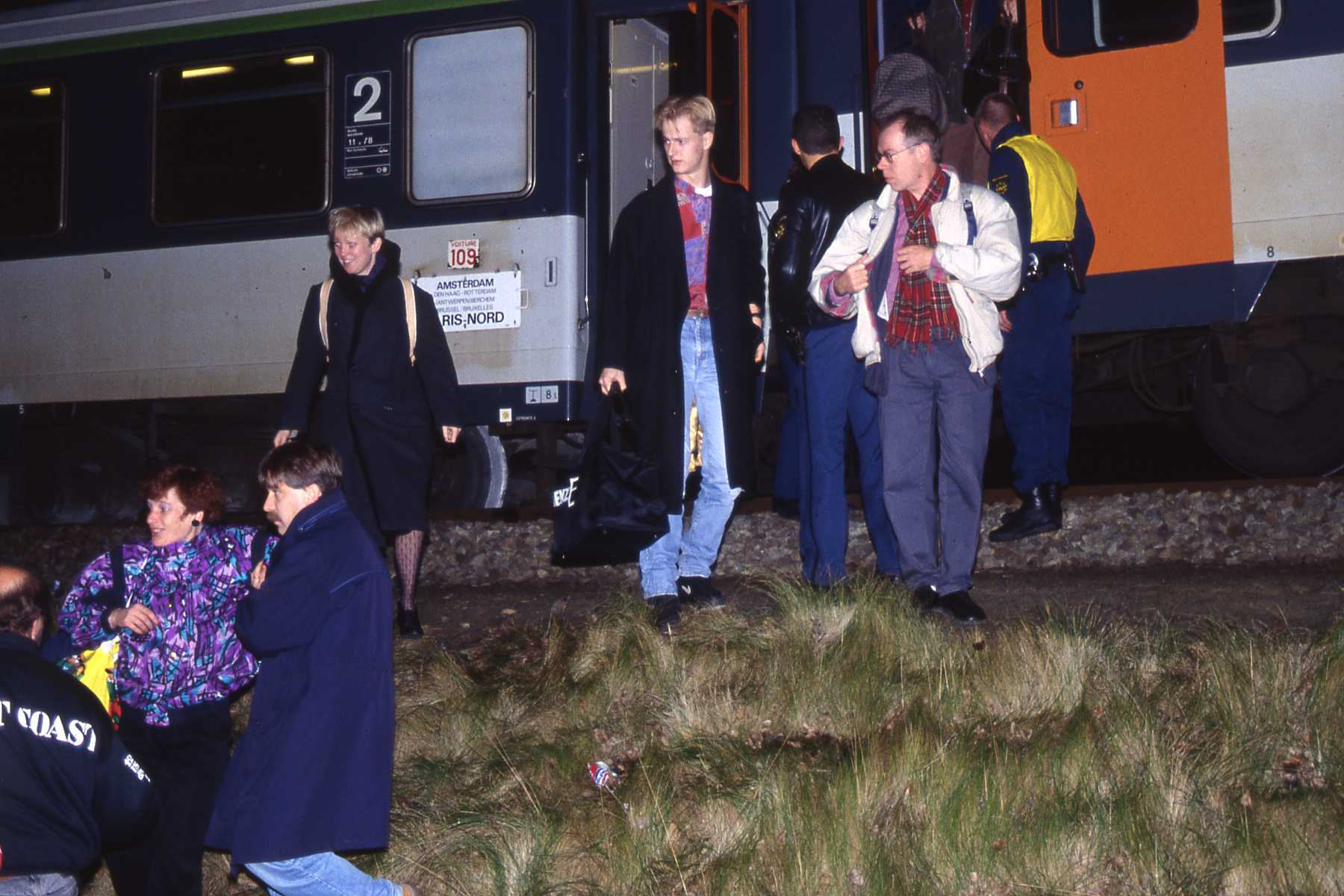
Passengers being evacuated from the Paris-Amsterdam train, 28 November 1992

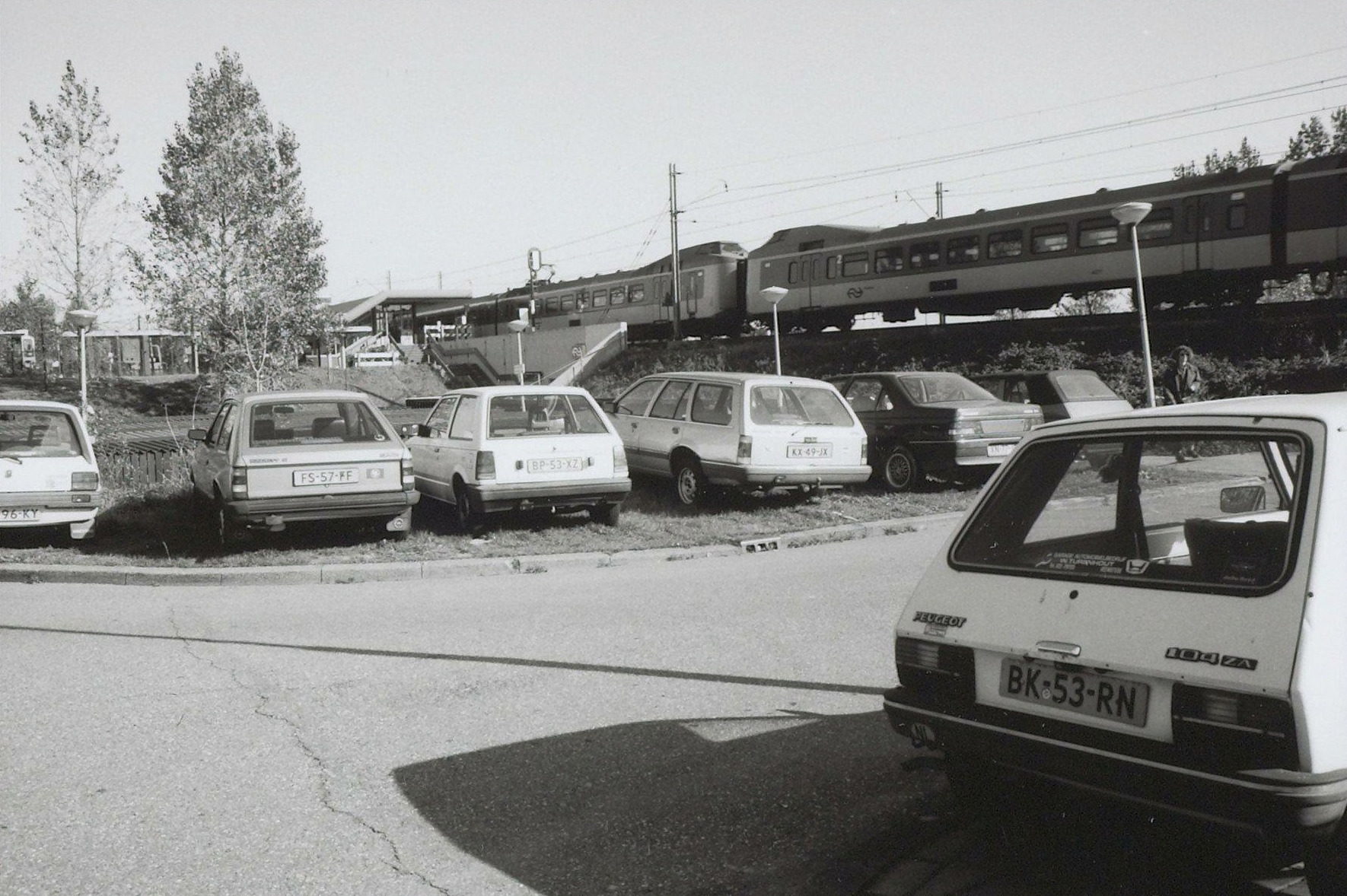
A Koploper at Hoofddorp station in 1992, not far away from where the accident occurred

=== The first accident ===
The first accident took place on 28 November 1992, when an express train from Paris-Nord to Amsterdam Centraal that was diverted through the Hoofddorp-Schiphol section, pulled by a NMBS HLE 25.5, passed through the S-curve at a speed of 120 km/h. The cause of this accident was the lack of attention by the train driver, who, despite having seen the speed warning signs, did not brake in time for the section. The 84-ton locomotive went through the S-curve first and its weight destroyed the track section, despite staying upright. The next three Corail carriages after the locomotive managed to derail as well. The train was later cleared out from the location. On the next day, circulation on the S-track was restored with a restricted speed limit of 30 km/h. On 30 November 1992, the local speed limit was set to 60 km/h.

=== The second accident ===
Later that day, the InterCity 2127 from Amsterdam CS to Vlissingen, made out of Koplopers 4224 and 4038 (seven carriages in total) passed the same area where the international train had derailed. At around 7:12 a.m., the first carriage began to tilt and overturned, falling onto the ground at a 180-degree angle compared to the rest of the trainset. Five people died in this carriage. The rest of the train also derailed but stayed upright.

It soon became clear that the track had no defects which could have caused another derailment; the cause of the accident was determined to be the train driving too fast. The investigation showed that going over 85 km/h in the S-curve would have most likely caused an accident. The InterCity train travelled at 106 km/h at the time of the derailment, and it is estimated that before braking, it travelled at 123 km/h (these being approximations, as the train was not fitted with a system that allowed speed registration).

According to the driver, he received no instructions that there was a speed restriction in the area; the investigation committee concluded that he had not read the speed restrictions properly. At the beginning of the week of the accident, the train drivers on the route section received a list of speed limits, in this case TSB 49 ("temporary speed limits for week 49"). From this list, the drivers would have been able to notice that between kilometers 19.7 and 20.5, a 90 km/h speed limit was in force (and a further 60& km/h speed limit for freight trains). After the first derailment, a supplement was added to the TSB 49, becoming ATSB 49-I. Apart from explaining the initial speed restriction reduced from 90 km/h to 60 km/h overall, it also included a speed restriction of 30 km/h between kilometer marks 20.4 and 20.7 which was added due to the derailment of the Express train on 28 November. The latter speed restriction would be handed over to the train drivers by the platform supervisors.

In the driver's own words, he was not aware of ATSB 49-I, however knew about the speed restrictions imposed by TSB 49, and claimed he proceeded with 80 km/h on the track section near the derailment, believing he could go with 90 km/h on that S-curve, even though the speed was limited to 60 km/h. However, the difference of speed in the train drivers' declaration and the investigators' result was caused by the train driver claiming he had seen a 30 km/h speed restriction sign. He had also seen the 60 km/h signs as well, but due to the higher cab of the Koploper, he assumed they said 90 km/h, and proceeded to the S-curve overspeeding.

== See also ==
Nuneaton rail crash, 1975, England: A fast overnight train also oversped in a section undergoing reconstruction, due to poorly configured illumination scheme of the restriction boards, leading to 6 deaths.
