= 1994 Lausanne derailment =

Railway incident in Switzerland

Lausanne derailment

Details
- Date: 29 June 1994; 2:56 a.m.
- Location: Lausanne
- Country: Switzerland
- Line: Basel – Monthey
- Operator: Swiss Federal Railways
- Incident type: Derailment

Statistics
- Trains: 1
- Deaths: 0
- Damage: 2 to 12 million Swiss francs

On June 29, 1994, a freight train, including tanker cars carrying chemicals, derailed at Lausanne station in Switzerland.

The train, coming from Basel and bound for the Ciba-Geigy factory in Monthey, derailed at 2:56 a.m.. Fourteen wagons of a freight train carrying forty cars derailed about 200 meters from the station. Seven cars overturned, including two tank cars containing 80,000 liters of epichlorohydrin - around 3-400 liters were spilled.

Three thousand people had to be evacuated from the area, three schools were closed, and the station remained closed to the public for several days. Hundreds of men from the Lausanne fire department, the Swiss Federal Railways (SBB), police and civil protection and chemical units were mobilised. Their costs were entirely paid by the SBB.

During the removal of the carriages the train derailed a second time, this time near Lutry. Following this and another derailment the same year in Affoltern, the Federal Railways developed and implemented a series of detection and safety systems on their freight trains.

The inquiry later established that due to braking, excessive longitudinal pressure forces formed in the long (700m) train, which led to derailment in the area of a deflecting switch with unfavourable track geometry. The braking rules for freight trains over 1200 tonnes were subsequently changed.
