= South Bend station (disambiguation) =

South Bend station is a train station in South Bend, Indiana, serving Amtrak.

South Bend station may also refer to:

- South Bend station (South Shore Line), a former South Shore Line station
- South Bend International Airport station, a current South Shore Line station
- Union Station (South Bend, Indiana), built in 1929 for the New York Central and Grand Trunk Western Railroads, closed in 1971
- South Bend (PRR station) built so the Pennsylvania Railroad could have access to South Bend
- Proposed South Shore Line station in South Bend

== See also ==
- South Bend (disambiguation)
