= South Street Station (South Bend, Indiana) =

Bus station in South Bend, Indiana

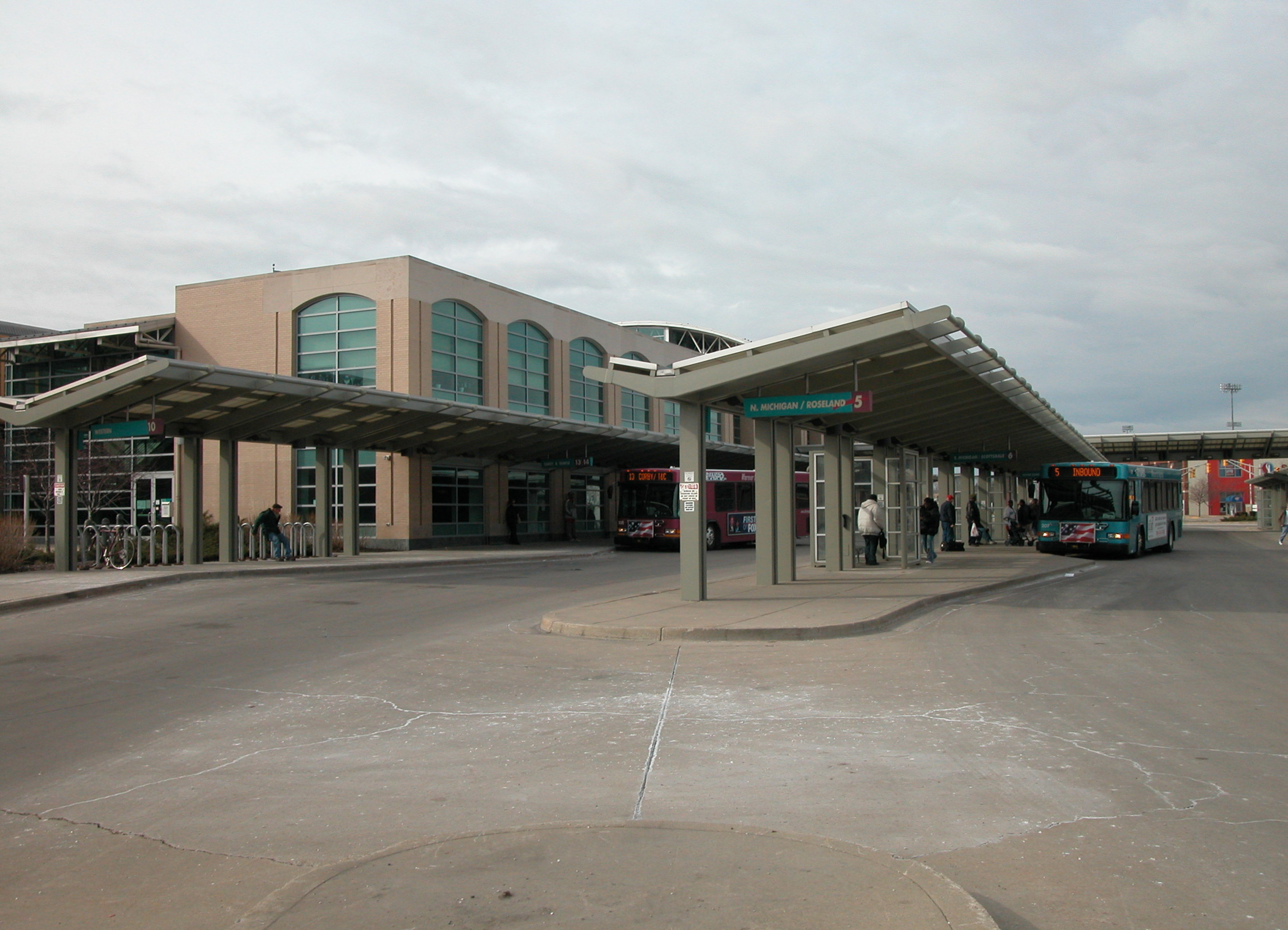
- South Street Station in 2006

General information
- Location: 100 W South Street, South Bend, Indiana, U.S.
- Coordinates: 41.66903°N 86.25127°W
- System: South Bend Transpo

History
- Opened: 30 June 1997

Services
South Bend Transpo
Intercity services (Greyhound Lines; Barons Bus Lines)
Location

South Street Station is a bus transit center located in the downtown of South Bend, Indiana. It is the primary hub of the South Bend Transpo local bus system, and is also served by intercity buses

== Description ==
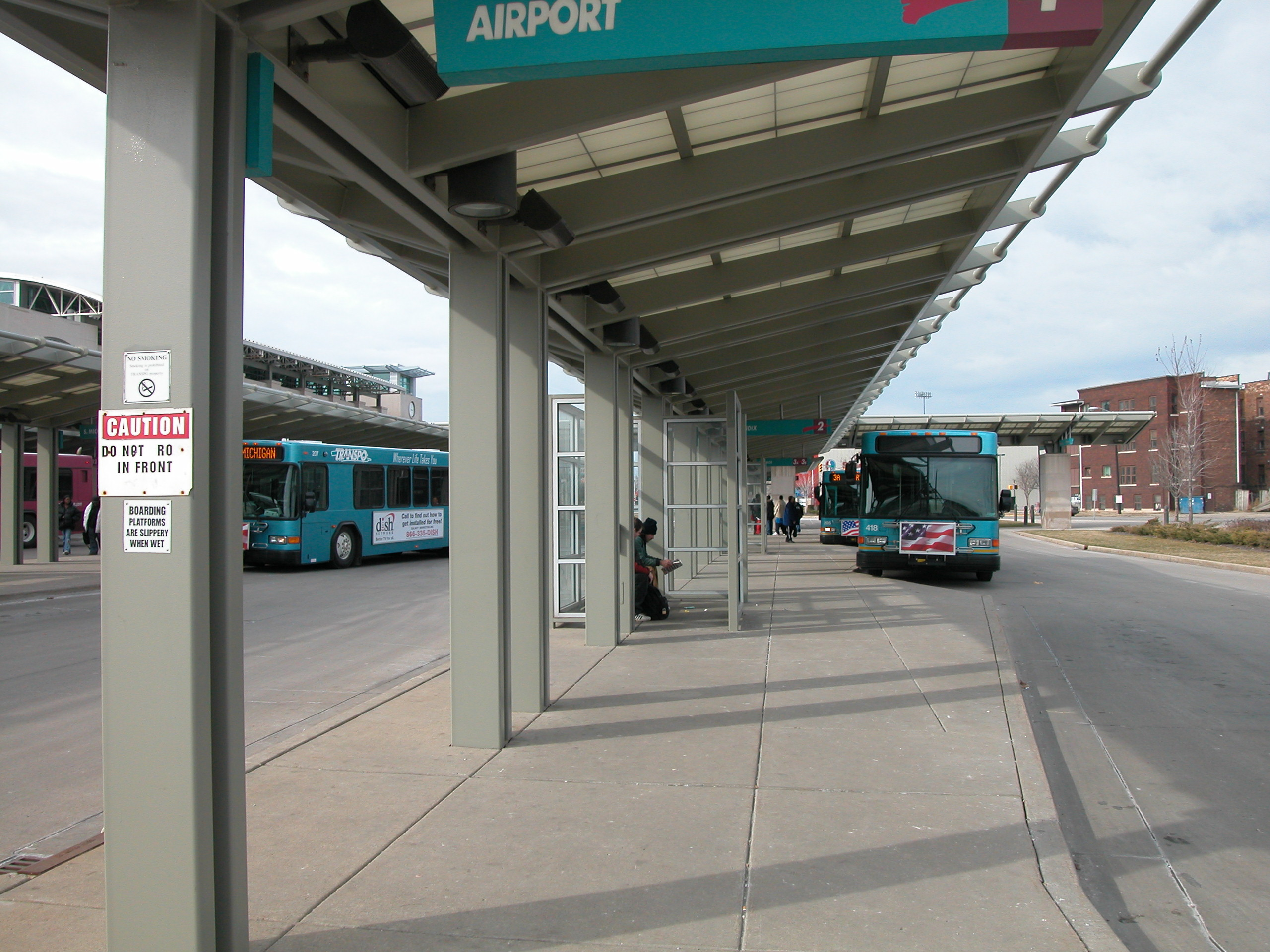
Bus bays at the transit center

The transit center is located in Downtown South Bend. The station includes a 14,800 square foot (1,370 m^{2}) building containing waiting areas, public restrooms, and other facilities.

== Construction ==
Efforts planning the South Street Station station date back to 1992. It was envisioned to be an intermodal transit hub that would feature a new station for Amtrak (replacing South Bend's existing Amtrak station) in addition to a transit center for South Bend Transpo. The project was championed by then-mayor Joe Kernan and other local officials. It was also envisioned that the station would house intercity bus services and a bus transit link to South Bend's airport. It was envisioned that, in addition to larger buses, smaller electric-powered shuttle buses would also be serving the transit center. A parking garage was planned to be attached to the station. A feasibility study for the project was finished in February 1993. In November 1993, the city of South Bend purchased land for the transit center. The $20.5 million facility received more than $13 million in federal funding by the start of 1997. With the new facility approved, on December 20, 1996, the South Bend Redevelopment Commission approved a proposal by Memorial Health Systems Inc. to build a 75,000 square foot (7,000 m^{2}) complex on the previous lot that was used as a transfer center. The station, during its planning, received criticism from some as an example of "pork barrel spending", receiving the 1996 "Oinkers Award" in the Pig Book published by Citizens Against Government Waste.

The previous transfer center, located at Main Street and Jefferson Boulevard, closed on June 28, 1997 (a Saturday), and buses moved to the South Street Station's intersection at Main Street and South Street on June 30, 1997 (a Monday). However, the building and the parking lot for buses at the South Street Station were still months away from completion, necessitating the temporary use of on-street parking for buses for several months. South Street Station's facilities were opened in 1998.

== Unrealized plans for Amtrak rail service ==
When it opened, South Street Station was solely a transfer center for local buses, with the Amtrak component planned to be built at a later date. Ultimately, the Amtrak component failed to materialize. Transpo had paid a firm in excess of $200,000 on design work for the Amtrak portion, with designs having the rail platform planned to be built on tracks located side of the rail embankment opposite from the bus depot. A pedestrian tunnel would have been constructed beneath the rail embankment to connect the South Street Station passenger facilities with the platform. However, plans were canceled after the railroad tracks owner (Norfolk Southern) refused to grant approval for its construction. Norfolk Southern cited concerns that it would disrupt the operations of a busy nearby freight yard. In 2004, Transpo general manager Mary McClain expressed her frustration with the railroad's refusal to compromise, calling their officials "not just uncooperative, but obstinate in their position." In addition to the Amtrak component of the transit center never materializing, a parking garage that was originally planned to be attached to the transit center also was never built.

In 2024, the city of South Bend purchased the Union Station building, which is located near to the South Street Station. Amtrak and the city both have expressed interest in returning intercity rail service to the former rail station.

== Intercity bus services ==
The bus served only local buses until December 2, 2019, when Greyhound Lines moved its intercity bus services from South Bend International Airport to the South Street Station, that it received intercity bus service. Barons Bus Lines is also now provides intercity bus service at South Street Station.

== Future plans ==
There have been talks of constructing a downtown South Shore Line station for South Bend. Such a station, if constructed, might be either adjacent to, or integrated into, the South Street Station.
