= South Bend (disambiguation) =

South Bend is the fourth largest city in the U.S. state of Indiana.

South Bend may also refer to:

== Places ==
- South Bend Township, Barton County, Kansas
- South Bend Township, Blue Earth County, Minnesota
- South Bend, Nebraska
- South Bend, Pennsylvania
- South Bend Township, Pennsylvania
- South Bend, Texas
- South Bend, Washington
- South Bend International Airport, Indiana

== Companies ==
- South Bend Watch Company
- South Bend Lathe Works

== See also ==
- South Bend station (disambiguation), stations of the name
- South Bend Blue Sox, a former women's professional baseball team
- South Bend Cubs, a U.S. Class A minor league baseball team
