= Four Winds Field at Coveleski Stadium =

Sports venue in South Bend, Indiana, US

- The Cove

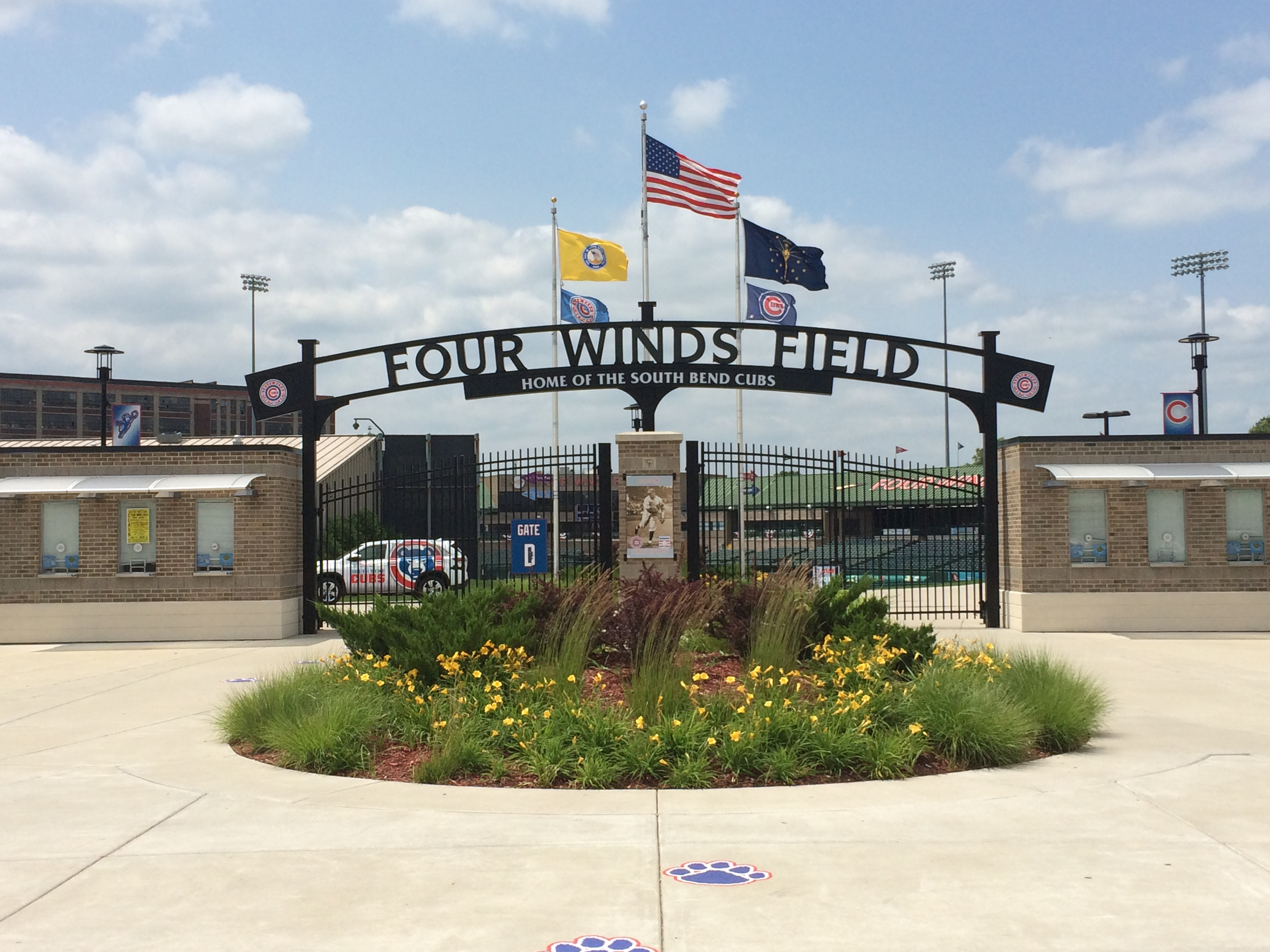

- Location within Indiana Location within the United States
- Interactive map of Four Winds Field at Coveleski Stadium
- Address: 501 West South Street; South Bend, Indiana 46601
- Coordinates: 41°40′13.42″N 86°15′19.72″W
- Owner: City of South Bend
- Operator: South Bend Parks & Recreation Department
- Capacity: Baseball: 10,500
- Surface: Natural Turf
- Field size: Left field – 336 ft Left Center Field – 360 ft Center Field – 405 ft Right Center Field – 360 ft Right field – 336 ft
- Public transit: Transpo at South Street Station

Construction
- Groundbreaking: August 1986
- Opened: July 2, 1987
- Cost: $11 million ($31.2 million in 2025 dollars)
- Architects: HOK Sport (original); Jones Petrie Rafinski (2010–2013 Renovations); Populous (2024–26 Renovations)

Tenants
- South Bend Cubs/South Bend Silver Hawks/South Bend White Sox (MWL) 1988–present Notre Dame Fighting Irish baseball 1988–1993

Four Winds Field at Coveleski Stadium is a baseball stadium in South Bend, Indiana, home to the South Bend Cubs, the High-A affiliate of the Chicago Cubs, which plays in the Midwest League. The stadium opened in 1987, and its open concourse is considered the template for many later minor league ball parks built in the 1990s. It has a capacity of 10,500 spectators, making it the largest park in the Midwest League and the only ballpark in all of High-A baseball with over 10,000 seats.

The park is named for Stan Coveleski, the Hall of Fame pitcher who retired to South Bend. It is colloquially known as "The Cove".

Coveleski Stadium is located on South Street in downtown South Bend.

== History ==
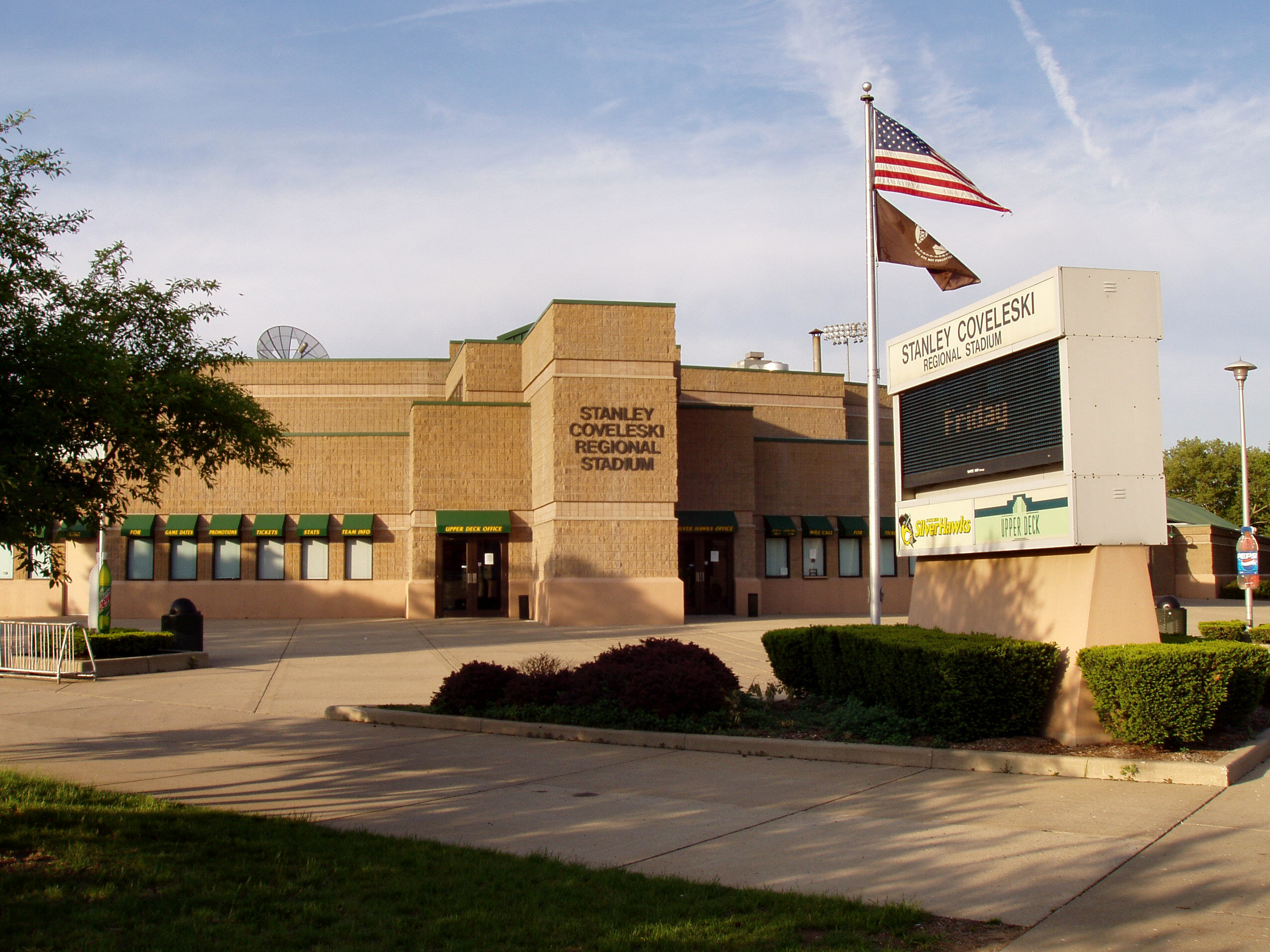
Coveleski Regional Stadium, pictured before renovation and name change to Four Winds Field at Coveleski Stadium

Stanley Coveleski Regional Stadium was built in 1987 for $11 million under the leadership of then-Mayor Roger O. Parent. The facility is owned by the City of South Bend and managed by the South Bend Parks & Recreation Department. Stanley Coveleski was a Hall of Fame pitcher who settled in South Bend after his successful baseball career came to an end in 1929. The stadium is now affectionately known as "The Cove". The 5,000-seat stadium is worth an estimated $35 million to $40 million today.

The stadium is home to the South Bend Cubs, a High-A minor league baseball team affiliated with the Chicago Cubs. The Cubs, for many years known as the "Silver Hawks", which play in the Midwest League, were originally named in homage to the Studebaker Silver Hawk, once made in South Bend. Originally affiliated with the Chicago White Sox, the team switched to the Diamondbacks in 1997 and to the Cubs for the 2015 season.

Called "the grandfather of the modern ballpark" by BallParkReviews.com, Coveleski Stadium provided a design template for a move in recent years to bring ballparks back into city downtowns. HOK Sport Inc. (now Populous), original architect of Coveleski Stadium, also designed Oriole Park at Camden Yards in Baltimore and Cleveland's Progressive Field.

Four Winds Field in 2024

On July 4, 1987, the stadium held a "Homerun Derby" to see who could "make history" by hitting the first home run out of the brand-new park. Norm Bogunia, a 1985 graduate of South Bend's Washington High School and former baseball player there, was the first to hit a home run. He was joined by five other people who also hit home runs that day. LaSalle High School baseball coach Scott Sill ran the pitching machine. Two days later, on July 6, 1987, Joel Reinebold hit the first home run at the stadium during a regular game. A plaque hangs in the stadium with all the names of those who hit home runs.

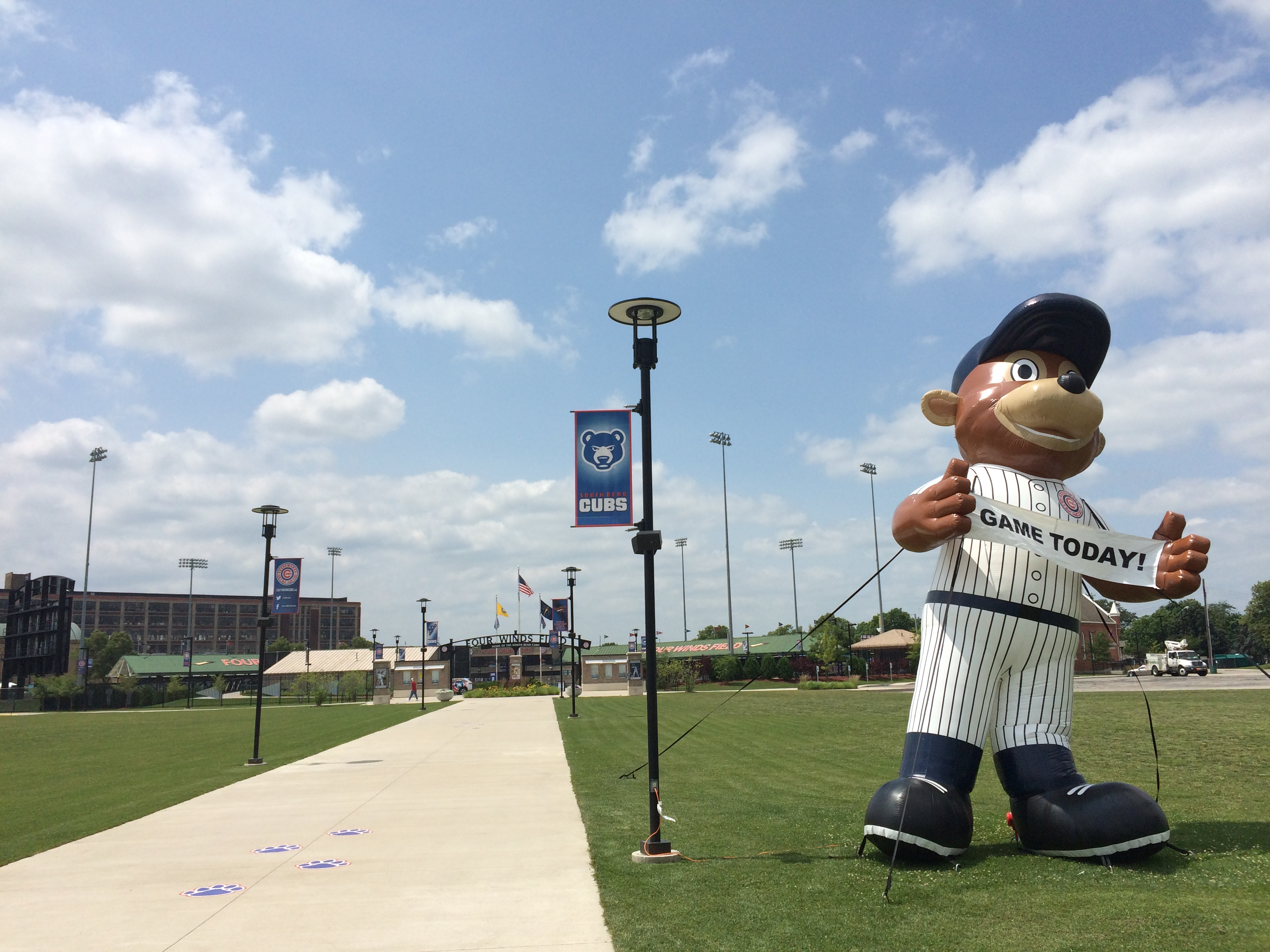
Walkway leading to The Cove, July 2015

=== Redevelopment ===
In 2007, as Coveleski Regional Stadium celebrated its 20th anniversary, the City of South Bend began a redevelopment plan for the neighborhood surrounding the ballpark prompted, in part, by the relocation of the Gates automotive dealership to Erskine Commons on the city's south side. The City acquired nearly 15 contiguous acres of property surrounding the park as part of a strategy to encourage new mixed-use development near the stadium and enhance its connection with the core of downtown.

In March 2017, construction began of a $22 million apartment complex, The Ivy at Berlin Place. The four four-story buildings will house 121 one and two-bedroom apartments overlooking the ballpark. Construction is expected to be completed by opening day of 2018.

Major stadium renovations began in the fall of 2024 and will continue for two years. The $48 million project will add an upper deck which will be ready for use in 2026 and increase capacity to just over 10,000. Features completed for the 2025 season include a new playing surface, new seating, and new protective netting.

=== Naming rights ===
On September 5, 2013, it was announced that the stadium would be renamed Four Winds Field at Coveleski Stadium as a result of a new partnership with Four Winds Casinos.

== Ballpark synagogue ==
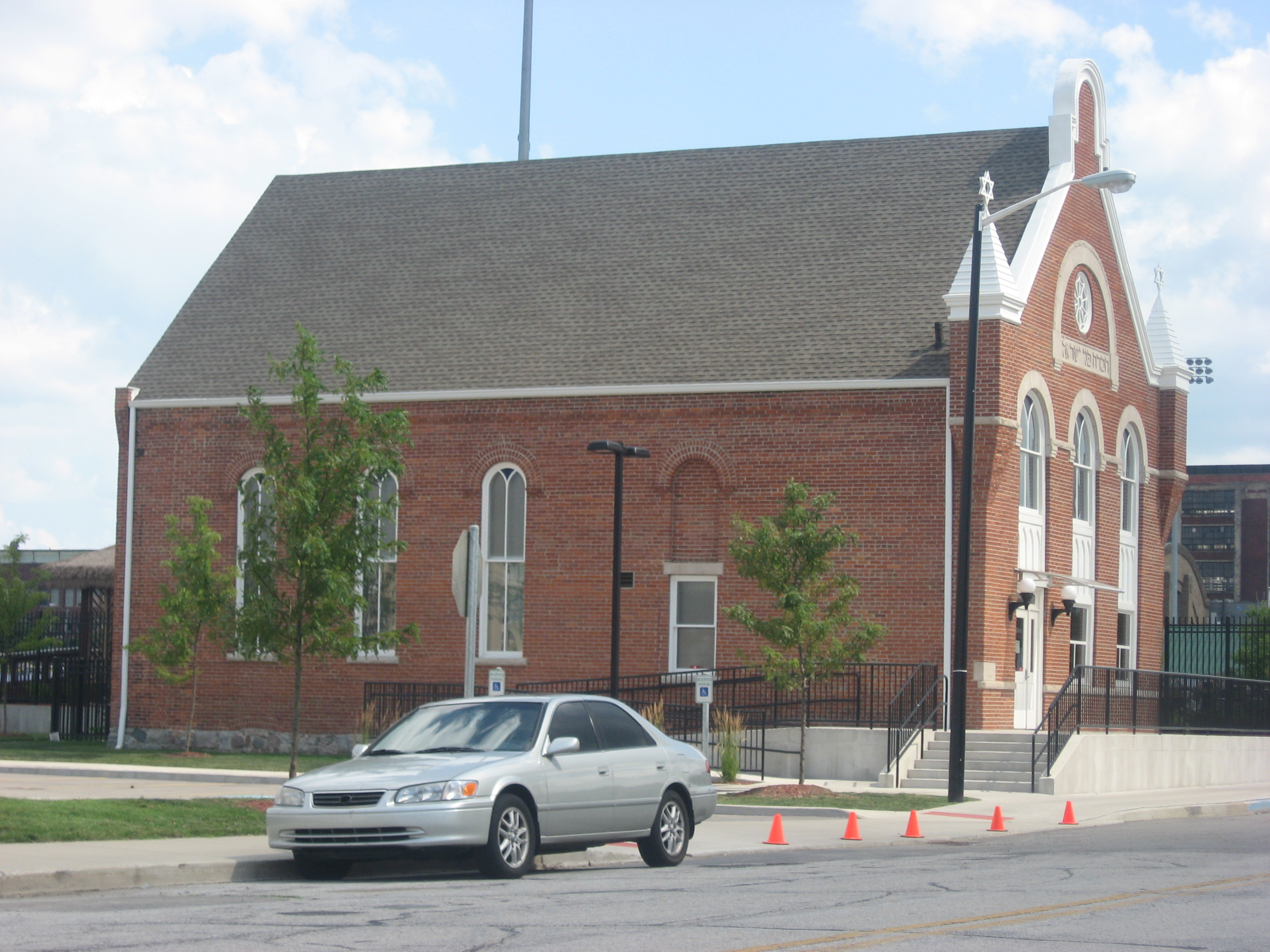
Ballpark Synagogue

The 1901 synagogue building of the Sons of Israel Synagogue is now used as the South Bend Cubs' gift shop. During the off-season, it is available to be used for weddings, bar mitzvahs, and other events. It also hosts a yearly town ball in July.

The restoration and imaginative reuse of a historic house of worship is regarded as part of Berlin's creative approach to enhancing fan experience, an approach that has included upgrading every part of the experience of visiting the ballpark, from food, to seating, to the ease of using the parking lot.
