= South Shore Line Airport Realignment =

Planned station at South Bend International Airport, Indiana

- Location: South Bend, Indiana
- Proposer: Northern Indiana Commuter Transportation District (NICTD)
- Project website: www.southshorelinesouthbendairportreroute.com
- Status: Planned
- Cost estimate: $112 million
- Start date: 2026
- Completion date: 2027

South Bend

General information
- Location: West side of South Bend International Airport; South Bend, Indiana
- Owner: NICTD
- Platforms: 1 island platform
- Tracks: 2
- Connections: Transpo

Construction
- Parking: Yes
- Accessible: Yes

Other information
- Fare zone: 11
- Website: project website

History
- Opening: 2027 (planned)

Services
Preceding station	NICTD	Following station
Hudson Lake toward Millennium Station	Lakeshore Corridor	Terminus

South Shore Line Airport Realignment is the name for a planned project which will see the South Shore Line passenger rail service move its main line's Indiana terminus from its current station on the east side of the South Bend International Airport to a new station at a location on the west side of the airport. The project will include the construction of new approach tracks. The project is expected to bring time savings, as the routing of the approach tracks to the existing station is circuitous, slow, and features many grade crossings.

When it was first opened in 1992, the current station on the airport's east side was originally intended to be a temporary location for the city's station. In 2006, officials began advancing plans to move the station to the airport's west side. In 2017, these plans again began gathering support. However, soon after, proposals for alternate locations for a station began to arise. A number of locations for a new replacement to its current terminus have been looked at, with a relocation to west side of the airport or a station in Downtown South Bend emerging as the top options. The option of moving the terminus to Downtown South Bend was championed by Pete Buttigieg during his tenure as mayor of South Bend. In late 2022, the Northern Indiana Commuter Transportation District (NICTD), the operator of the South Shore Line, advanced plans to begin construction on a new station at the west side of the airport as early as late 2024, commissioning an engineering study to prepare for this. Even if it builds a new station on the west side of the airport, NICTD has not ruled out the possibility of also building a future connection to Downtown South Bend. By 2022, NICTD began progressing plans for a new station on the west side of the airport. While some debate on whether the community should instead pursue a downtown terminus persisted, by early 2025 the project for a new station on the airport's west side was nearing final approval.

== Background ==
South Bend International Airport station, the current South Shore Line terminus serving South Bend, Indiana, was opened at South Bend International Airport on November 20, 1992. The station's location on the east side of the airport was chosen due to the existence of a freight spur at that site, but this alignment was originally intended to be only temporary. The route that carries the South Shore Line to the station is considered slow and circuitous.

Poor track conditions on the approach to the existing further limits trains speeds, also lengthening travel times on all trains serving the terminus. Even though deteriorated track conditions have exacerbated speed limitations along the spur, these limitations have always been present. The first trains to serve the station when it opened in 1992 already ran slow along the spur due to concerns with the track's geography, as it ran parallel to a busy road (Bendix Drive), and had many level crossings with side streets as well as several crossings with high-traffic roadways (one with Lincoln Way West, and two with Bendix Drive). Due to slow speeds on the spur, when the station opened the scheduled running-times of South Shore Line trains into South Bend was extended by five minutes compared to the scheduled running-times of trains into the previous station.

== Development of plans and exploration of alternatives ==
=== Early plans to relocate the station to the west side of the airport ===
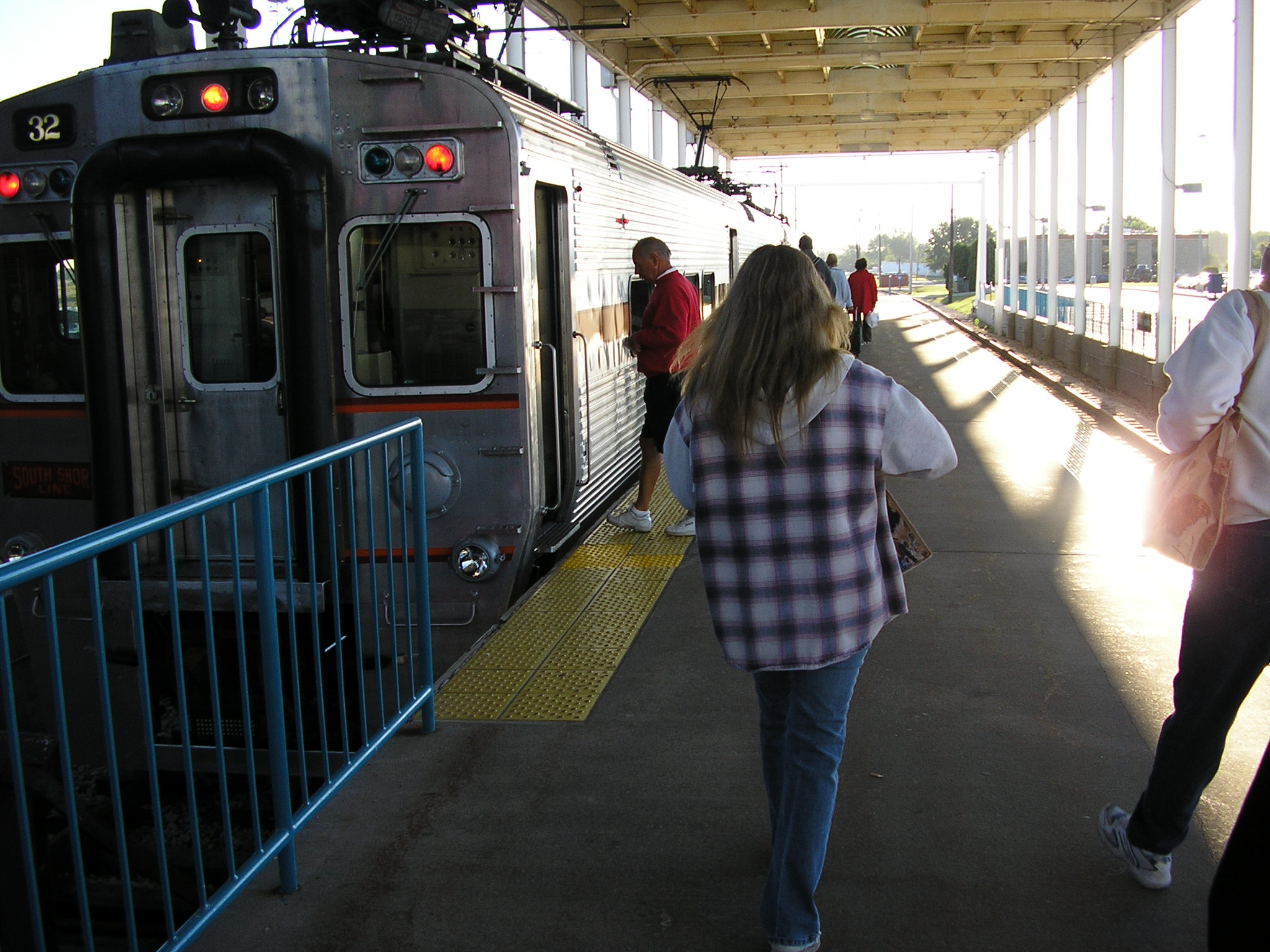
Passengers boarding a South Shore Line train at the platform of the current South Bend International Airport station

The idea of moving the station to the west side of the airport has been floated since the 1990s. Beginning in 2006, NICTD made it a listed priority to explore relocating the station to the west end of the airport. Such plans were priorized in hopes of decreasing travel times by as much as 10 minutes. By having South Shore Line trains approach the airport from the west, the traveling distance would be shortened. Additionally, such a route would decrease the number of at-grade crossings to as few as seven grade crossings, as opposed to the twenty-three grade crossings found in the current east approach to the airport. Plans exist by St. Joseph County to construct a rail spur to this area of the airport with the aim of also fostering the creation of an intermodal rail-air freight hub at the airport. An environmental analysis study was conducted in 2008. At the time of the publication of its May 2014 executive summary, the Northern Indiana Commuter Transportation District (NICTD), the agency which runs the South Shore Line, estimated that this would cost $15 million. These initial plans to relocate the station to the airport's west side faced local opposition from residents of the Ardmore neighborhood of South Bend after it was proposed that the new tracks approaching a station there would travel through the neighborhood (in the area between Oak Road and Lexington Avenue) and displace as many as forty households there.

In 2017, South Bend's redevelopment commission voted to spend $25 million in tax increment financing funds to build a new station. This was part of a deal with St. Joseph County, in which the county would contribute $18 million to double-track the South Shore Line between Gary and Michigan City, while the city would contribute $25 million to pay for the relocation of the station to the airport's west side. South Bend mayor Pete Buttigieg was supportive of the municipal expenditure for this project at the time.

=== Emergence of alternate proposals ===
Locally preferred alternatives were presented to the original proposal to relocate the station. One was to instead build a new station on parking lots at Westmoor Street west of Bendix Drive (along existing South Shore Line tracks), located on property owned by the Honeywell Corporation. Concerns about this location, however, included citizens feeling it was not a safe area. There was also discussion of extending the South Shore Line into the city's downtown, though some saw it as likely to be cost-prohibitive. In September 2017, the South Bend Common Council unanimously passed a resolution urging that as many homes in Ardmore as possible be spared from being demolished by the proposed relocation project. A study was made producing an alternate plan which would take a different path. However this proposal too drew opposition from property owners whose land would be impacted.

In December 2017, the South Bend Chocolate Company publicly discussed the possibility of building a station at the location of their planned new factory and tourist destination. They had selected a 90-acre (36 ha) site to the southwest of the U.S. 20 intersection of and St. Joseph Valley Parkways planned to build a new factory at, as well as two planned museums: the first a relocation of its existing chocolate museum (which was already receiving 50,000 visitors at its existing location) and the other being a planned "Indiana Dinosaur" Museum. In addition to this, the company was giving open consideration to building other attractions on the site, including a hotel, a winery, a restaurant, a bison farm, and hiking trails. It was argued that a station would enhance the venture's prospects of attracting tourists from Chicago and other areas in the region.

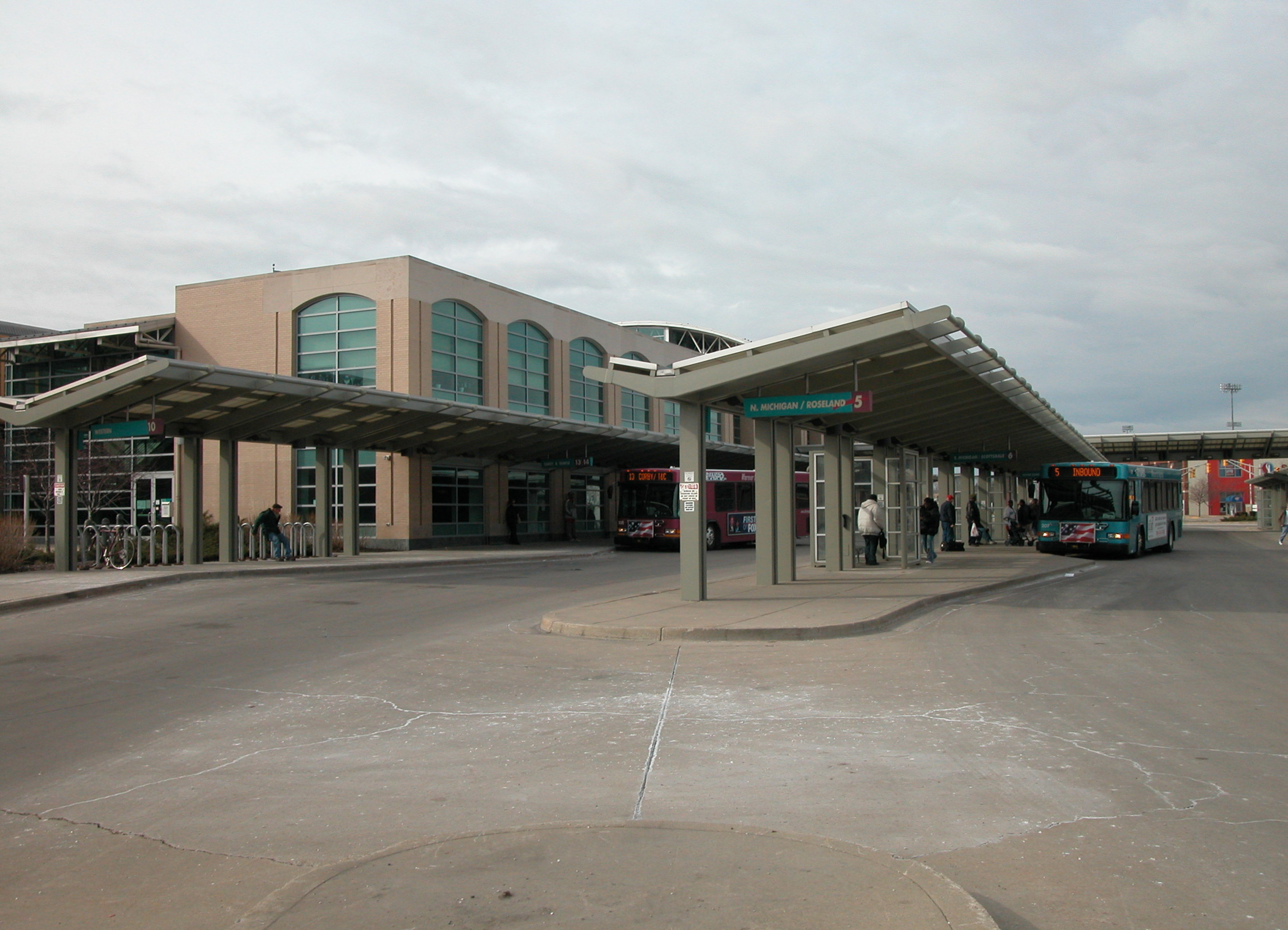
A downtown station could be located adjacent to, if not integrated into, the existing South Bend Transpo South Street Station.

In August 2018, Buttigieg began to advocate for a new South Shore Line station to instead be located in South Bend's downtown. Buttigieg expressed hope that a downtown South Shore Line station could be completed by 2025. This marked a change from Buttigieg's past support for plans to relocate the station to the west side of the airport. Mike Noland, the president of NICTD expressed his belief that the west side of the airport was more easily attainable in the short-term than a downtown station. There had previously been talk in the 1980s, before the airport station was constructed, of having the South Shore Line stop at the Union Station in downtown South Bend, either instead of or in addition to stopping at the airport. It is likely that, if constructed, a downtown South Bend station would entirely supplant the existing airport station. A downtown station would likely be located near Four Winds Field at Coveleski Stadium and the Union Station Technology Center. It could be adjacent to, if not integrated into, the existing South Bend Transpo South Street Station. When it was built in 1998, South Street Station had been constructed with its passenger facilities near abutting train tracks with an eye towards a future passenger rail component. A study commissioned in 2018 on the feasibility of a downtown station envisioned a downtown station as being located directly between the Union Station Technology Center and Four Winds Field at Coveleski Stadium, replacing a segment of South Street.

While Buttigieg pushed for the community to look into the potential for a downtown station, he also conceded that it might ultimately prove to be too expensive of a project.

=== 2018 study of possible locations ===
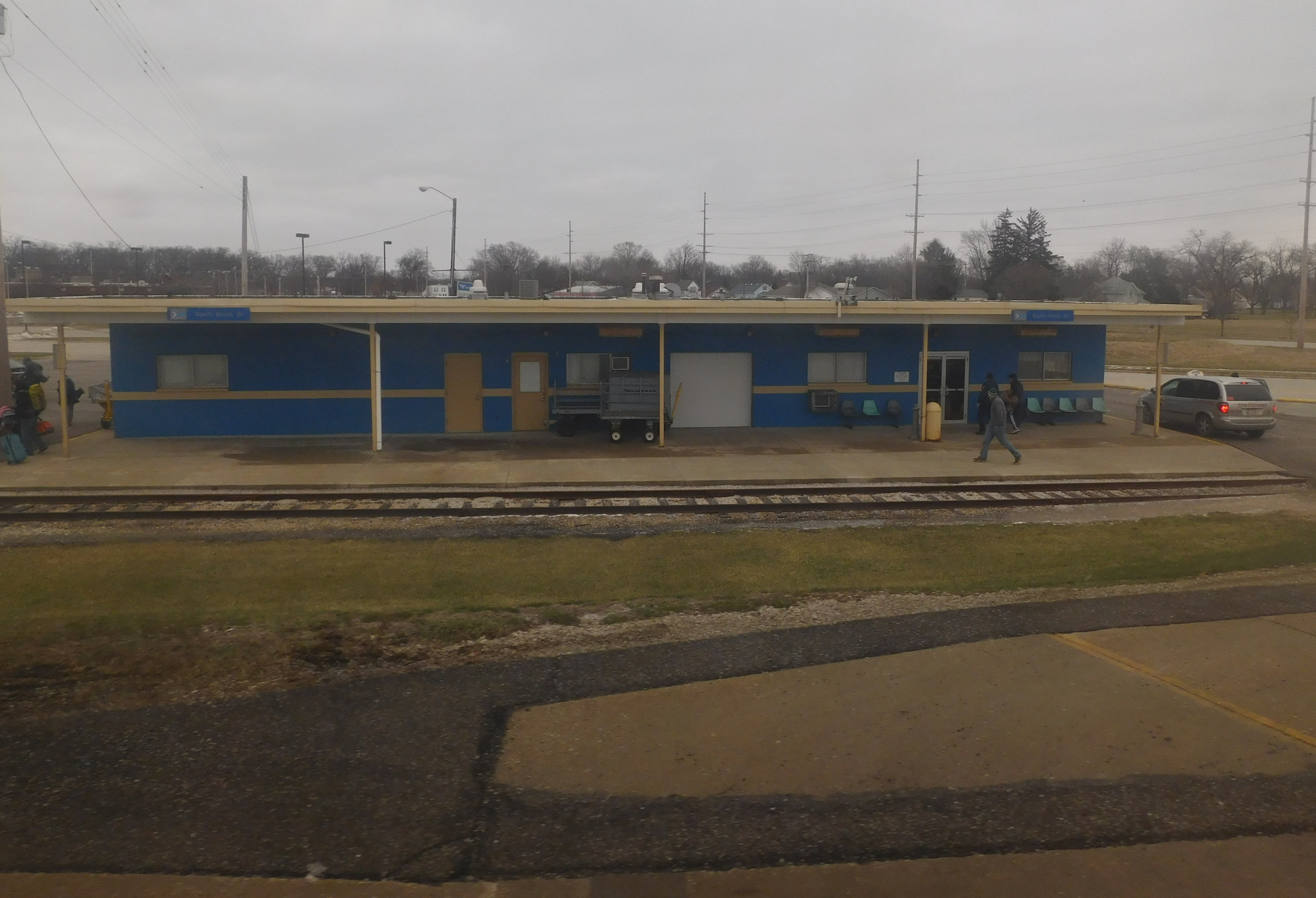
The existing South Bend Amtrak station (previously used by the South Shore Line before its current station was built) was studied as a potential site for the station's relocation.

In 2018, Mayor Buttigieg ordered a study of five possible locations for a new station serving South Bend. The five locations being explored are the aforementioned west airport relocation, downtown station, and Honeywell Corporation sites, the site in the southwest quadrant of the U.S. 20 and U.S. 31 interchange that the South Bend Chocolate Factory tourist destination was planned for, and the existing South Bend Amtrak station. The study also explored the impact of retaining the existing station instead of constructing a new one. The report was published in April 2018. By August 2018, after the report's publication, both Buttigieg and NICTD president Mike Noland publicly declared their belief that the Honeywell Corporation site, chocolate factory site, and Amtrak site were eliminated from further consideration.

Map

Approximate coordinates of considered sites
Location	Coordinates (links to map & photo sources)
Current airport station	41.700780°N 86.310779°W
Amtrak station	41.678340°N 86.287683°W
Chocolate factory	41.707165°N 86.344509°W
Downtown	41.669581°N 86.255369°W
Honeywell	41.684765°N 86.302663°W
West side of airport	41.699781°N 86.314417°W

The study found that, indeed, any relocation would decrease the travel time, with the fastest train to Millennium Station if the existing station is retained being 115 minutes, whilst all other station options would have the fastest train to Millennium station be between 82 and 84 minutes. The fastest train from Millennium Station if the existing station is retained would be 118 minutes, whilst for all other options it would be between 90 and 92 minutes.

The costs to build each new station option were estimated by the study. A new west airport station was found to cost $29.5 million, a downtown station was found to cost $102.3 million, the Honeywell Corporation site was found to cost $23.9 million, the chocolate factory site was found to cost $44.3 million, and the Amtrak station was found to cost $31.7 million.

The potential ten-year economic impact of each station option was studied. Retaining the existing station could still generate $39 million in economic impact. The new west airport station could generate $83.8 million, a downtown station could generate $415.3 million, the Honeywell Corporation site could generate either $171.5 million (if mixed-use development is built around it) or $132 million (if industrial development is built around it), the chocolate factory site could generate $144.4 million, and the Amtrak station could generate $139.7 million.

Forecasted travel times and weekday ridership
Station option	Travel times		Forecasted weekday ridership (year 2040)
Station option	To Millennium station	From Millennium station	Forecasted weekday ridership (year 2040)
Current airport station	115–160 minutes	118–155 minutes	—N/a
Amtrak station	82–98 minutes	90–97 minutes	731
Chocolate factory	82–98 minutes	90–97 minutes	698
Downtown	84–100 minutes	92–99 minutes	735
Honeywell	82–98 minutes	90–97 minutes	729
West side of airport	84–100 minutes	92–99 minutes	727

Forecasted cost
Station option	Estimated base capital costs	Potential range of capital costs	Annual operations and management costs
Current airport station	—N/a	—N/a	—N/a
Amtrak station	$31,727,000	$28.3–31.7 million	$577,430
Chocolate factory	$44,274,000	$40.7–44.3 million	$247,430
Downtown	$102,302,000	$98.4–102.3 million	$577,430
Honeywell	$23,870,000	$14.3–23.9 million	$577,430
West side of airport	$29,480,000	$29.5 million	$247,430

Forecasted potential development around stations
Station option	Acres available for development within half-mile	Potential new construction value within half-mile	Station area typology	Influence of transit on station area's development program	Potential 10-year economic impact	Potential 10-year fiscal impact	
Station option	Acres available for development within half-mile	Potential new construction value within half-mile	Station area typology	Influence of transit on station area's development program	Potential 10-year economic impact	Property taxes	All taxes
Current airport station	63	$24,590,000	Industrial	Low	$39,000,000	$4,486,00	$7,210,000
Amtrak station	64	$23,250,000	Neighborhood transit-oriented development (TOD)	Moderate	$139,700,000	$2,556,000	$11,440,000
Chocolate factory	221	$40,230,000	Special destination	Moderate	$144,400,000	$5,921,000	$15,400,000
Downtown	83	$147,810,000	Downtown	Moderate	$415,300,000	$18,639,000	$45,150,000
Honeywell (mixed-use redevelopment scheme)	86	$73,070,000	Neighborhood TOD	High	$171,500,000	$8,563,000	$19,410,100
Honeywell (industrial redevelopment scheme)	86	$47,320,000	Industrial	Moderate	$132,000,000	$5,640,000	$14,110,000
West side of airport	34	$17,820,000	Industrial	Low	$83,800,000	$3,251,000	$8,800,000

Analysis of other criteria
Station option	Space available for station, platform and parking	Factors complicating construction of station	Likely environmental action required
Current airport station	Good	—N/a	—N/a
Amtrak station	Good	Impacts to Chicago South Shore and South Bend Railroad (CSS) yard tracks and compatibility with the operations of CSS and Norfolk Southern (NS)	Environmental assessment
Chocolate factory	Good	Plan is predicated on private development plans; property acquisition required for approach tracks; CSS storage tracks	Environmental impact statement
Downtown	Adequate	Limited right of way for rail and station between Walnut Street and downtown South Bend; compatibility with the operations of NS and Canadian National (CN)	Environmental impact statement
Honeywell	Good	Properties are currently owned by the Honeywell Corporation; access is near Honeywell operations	Environmental assessment or categorical exclusion
West side of airport	Good	Property acquisition required for approach tracks	Environmental assessment

=== Downtown station feasibility study ===
In December 2018, an $181,000 engineering study was commissioned by the South Bend Redevelopment Commission to further examine the cost of a downtown station. This study was not made available to the public until, after a public record request, it was released in March 2021 to the South Bend Tribune and thereafter published by the newspaper. The study showed that rerouting South Shore Line trains into the city's downtown would require numerous properties to be acquired, the city's Amtrak station to be relocated, two structures at a public housing complex to be demolished, and a soccer field at the Salvation Army Kroc Center to be demolished.

The study estimated that the cost to construct a downtown station would be $112 million, which is more than the $102 million that the previous study had estimated. The reason for this higher estimate was due to both inflation and challenges that had become better understood as a result of this study. The study estimated that a downtown station would generate a $430 million economic impact and create 7,770 new jobs in a ten-year period. The study estimated that, when measured through new tax revenue, the return on capital cost would be 40%. However, when measured through economic impact, the return on capital cost was estimated at 336%.

=== Subsequent developments (2019–2021) ===
In their 2019 capital plan, NICTD set aside $30 million for a relocation of the station and track realignment.

In early 2019, standing firm in their support for building a rail spur to the west side of the South Bend International Airport, St. Joseph County commissioned a $119,000 study to look at the construction of such a spur. The study would consider two routes running both through the neighborhood located between U.S. 31 and Mayflower Road. The first route to be considered was down Sundown Road, and the second was down Oak Road. Both routes were further west than the earlier-considered route, and were located between Oak Road and Butternut Road. The study was to look at both the potential of a freight-only spur and the potential of a spur shared by both freight and passenger trains. This study has not been released to the public.

As of March 2021, the Federal Aviation Administration had not given permission for the routing of tracks and overhead catenary through a protected area near South Bend International Airport's runway. Such permission would be required for the proposed location on the west side of the airport.

A decision regarding the future of South Bend's South Shore Line station was originally anticipated to be made at some point in 2020. No such decision came. In March 2021, it was reported by the South Bend Tribune that community leaders had not yet reached a consensus as to where to build a new South Shore Line station.

While the 2018 estimate had been that a downtown station would cost $102 million, and the downtown feasibility study estimated that it would cost $112 million, some other cost projections are as high as nearly $200 million. Some St. Joseph County officials, such as St. Joseph County Board of Commissioners president Andy Kostielney, have come out in opposition to a downtown station due to its cost. The county has continued to officially prefer the west airport option. However, this could cost more than $50 million, and South Bend mayor James Mueller (Buttigieg's successor) has remained tepid towards contributing funding to a new station on the west side of the airport without first hearing a persuasive case that a freight complex there would have strong economic benefit. Mueller has also stated that he believes the cost projections of both the downtown and west airport options have increased to such a point that neither is realistic without financial support from federal or state sources. In early 2022, Mueller stated that the city's long-term vision is to have a station located in its downtown. There had been speculation as to whether Buttigieg, by then United States secretary of transportation, would be hesitant to make federal funding available to the project out of fear of the appearance of favoritism to his hometown.

In 2021, NICTD officials indicated that if a new station is built on the west side of the airport, they intend to run short turn shuttle trains between Michigan City, Indiana, and the station in order to encourage use of the airport. These trains would run in addition to the existing trains that travel to/from Chicago. It was suggested that the shuttle trains could run hourly.

== South Shore Line Airport Realignment project (2022–present) ==
On August 1, 2022, NICTD's board of trustees voted to issue a request for proposals to move the station to the west side of the airport. NICTD hopes to be able to obtain federal funds allotted by the Infrastructure Investment and Jobs Act.

NICTD's president has claimed that the project would neither interfere with potential freight operations at the airport nor the possibility of adding a station in downtown South Bend. NICTD's president has even proposed the idea of, sometime after the station on the west side of the airport is built, extending the South Shore Line to downtown; proposing that if both stations are constructed, the downtown station would ultimately serve as the South Shore Line's commuter services' terminus, while a separate shuttle service would run between the downtown station and the west airport station.

In November 2022, NICTD hired an engineering firm to complete $6 million in design work for the proposed route to a west airport station, with preliminary environmental studies being scheduled to be finished in September 2023 and engineering studies scheduled to be finished in March 2024. The preliminary environmental studies would assist in the eligibility of the project for federal grants. As of the time that the engineering firm was hired, NICTD officials expressed openness to the possibility of building a branch line to downtown South Bend after a west airport station is possibly opened. Around this time, Mueller commented that one advantage that he recognized rerouting to the west side of the airport having over keeping the existing alignment was a decrease in the number of at-grade railway crossings, remarking,

Fewer crossings at grade crossings leads to better safety for our motorists and pedestrians and bicyclists that have to traverse those intersections. So it's safety, it's economy, it's a win-win for our community.

As of late 2022, plans for the west airport relocation had construction beginning as early as the fall or winter of 2024 dependent on the ability to secure federal funding. NICTD is hoping that federal funding could pay for approximately half of the station project's expense, which as of April 2023 is estimated to cost between $75 million and $80 million. To construct trackage to the planned new west airport station, NICTD is expected to need to acquire land currently occupied by approximately ten houses in South Bend's Ardmore neighborhood.

=== Continued debate ===
Some community leaders have continued to argue for the downtown location to be instead pursued, with some advocating for the former Union Station to be utilized. Mayor Mueller has continued to voice that there would be advantages to instead constructing a downtown station, which he has touted as being a "transformational" project, remarking,

A lot of things are coming together on the south side of downtown, and train service would seamlessly fit in. We see the benefits of getting to Chicago in 90 minutes, but it's hard to get excited about moving the station from one side of the airport to the other.

Noland has claimed that the Norfolk Southern Railway has expressed no interest in allowing the South Shore Line to construct trackage into the city's downtown on right-of-way which it owns, which would mean that a downtown station would require the acquisition of new right of way by NICTD contributing to such a project's expense. Noland has claimed that he believes that the cost of such a station would shoot up to $250 million if it required the purchase of a new right of way. Mayor Mueller, however, has questioned whether there is in fact a firm refusal from the railroad to partner. The University of Notre Dame, a large higher-education institution located in the South Bend area, has expressed its support for the South Shore Line taking advantage of the opportunity for federal funds and relocating of the station to the west side of the airport when such funds are available. The university, however, has also expressed that it does not oppose a downtown station location. A similar stance has been expressed by the South Bend Regional Chamber of Commerce.

=== Finalization of plans ===
In late 2024, NICTD head Michael Noland publicized the rail operator's intent of breaking ground on the project in early 2026 and completing the project sometime the following year. He also said that it is expected that travel time savings the new station would bring would be between 13 and 15 minutes, achieving 90 minute running times between the new South Bend Airport station and Millennium Station in Chicago. As of February 2025, this was still the preferred timeline for the project if its progress does not experience delays. NICTD aims to complete the submission of all design work by October 2025. It is hoped that new time savings will compliment the time savings of as much as 30 minutes already created by the completion of the double tracking of portions of South Shore Line trackage between Michigan City and Illinois.

By the end of 2024, construction cost estimates for a new west airport station had risen to $112 million, with NICTD aiming to secure state and federal funding for the project. NICTD is seeking to secure $28 million in funding from local sources, such as the city government of South Bend, the government of St. Joseph County. Local sources may also include partnerships with local private institutions (such as the South Bend Regional Chamber of Commerce), organizations, and businesses. NICTD has committed $6 million of its own budget towards the $28 million in locally sourced funding, still requiring $22 million more to come from other local sources. It is believed that the Northern Indiana Regional Development Authority will likely need to fund a large share of this. Concerns about whether the project can obtain federal funding have been raised due to uncertainty caused by the second Trump Administration's impacts on federal spending and the distribution of allocations.

In December 2024, NICTD and the South Bend International Airport reached a formal agreement in regards to the relocation of the South Shore Line to the airport's west side. The new agreement will see NICTD pay $25,000 annually to the airport for use of a rail easement, a decrease from the $75,000 paid annually to the airport for use of the east station's rail easement.

By February 2025, much of the advance groundwork had been completed, including environmental studies, engineering work. Additionally, public meetings on the project had been held and approximately ten property owners had been given notice that property owned by them was being planned for acquisition to create a right of way for the approach tracks to the new station. Additionally, 160 parcels of property had already been acquired. NICTD sought to begin land acquisition of remaining parcels before the end of 2025 if it secured funding to do so, which did not occur. As of February 2026, expected costs for the project remain $112 million, and if the needed funds are secured to proceed NICTD aims to start construction by the end of 2026 and begin service in late 2027.
