= South Bend International Airport station =

South Shore Line station in Indiana

South Bend
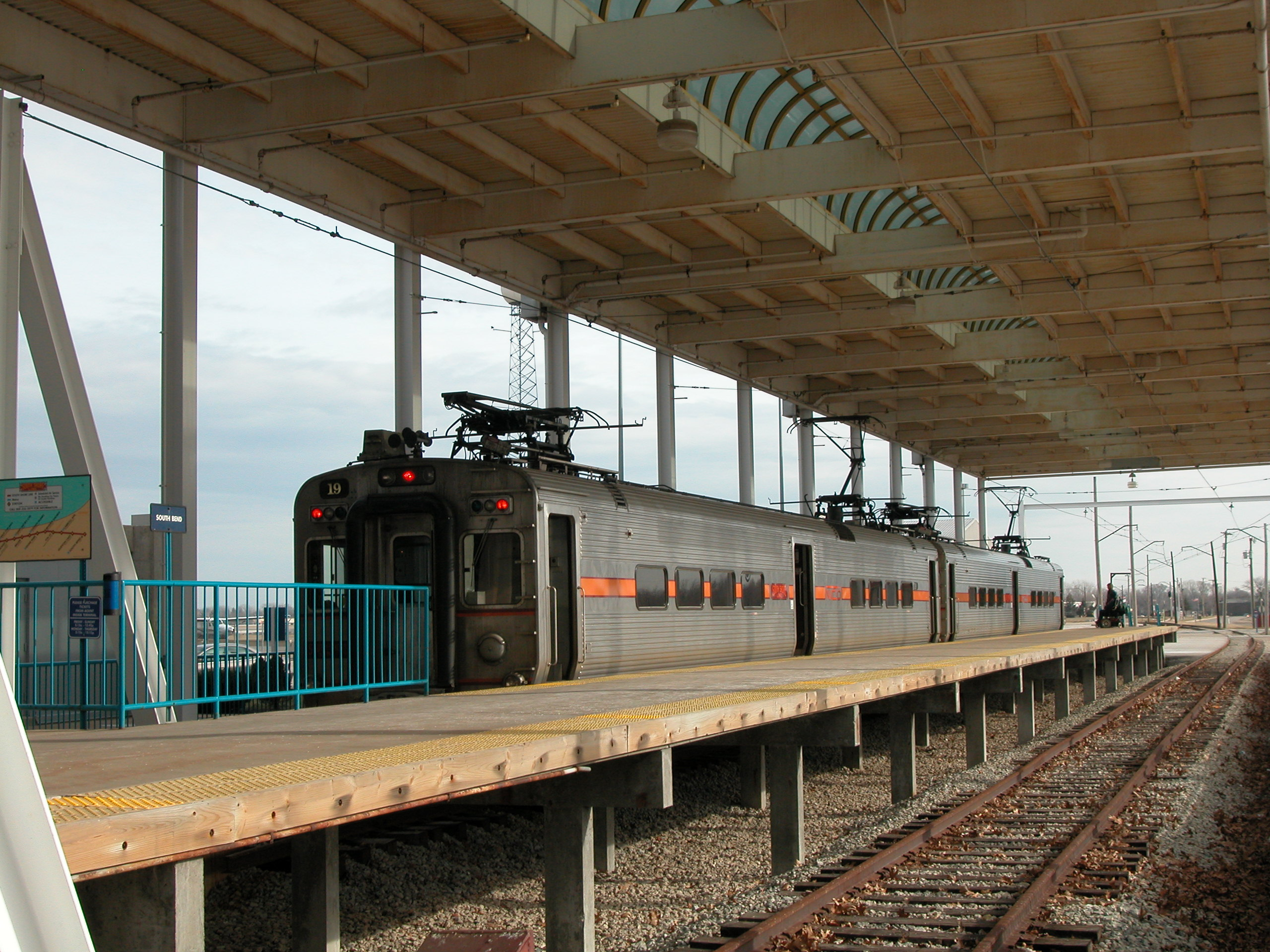
- A South Shore Line train at the station's platform in 2006

General information
- Location: 4485 Progress Drive; South Bend, Indiana
- Coordinates: 41.7008°N 86.3110°W
- Owner: NICTD
- Platforms: 1 island platform
- Tracks: 2
- Connections: Transpo

Construction
- Parking: Yes
- Accessible: Yes

Other information
- Fare zone: 11

History
- Opened: November 20, 1992
- Rebuilt: 2026–2027 (planned)

Passengers
- 2019: 227 (average weekday)

Services
Preceding station	NICTD	Following station
Hudson Lake toward Millennium Station	Lakeshore Corridor	Terminus
Former services
Preceding station	NICTD	Following station
New Carlisle Closed 1994 toward Randolph Street	South Shore Line	Terminus
Track layout
Location

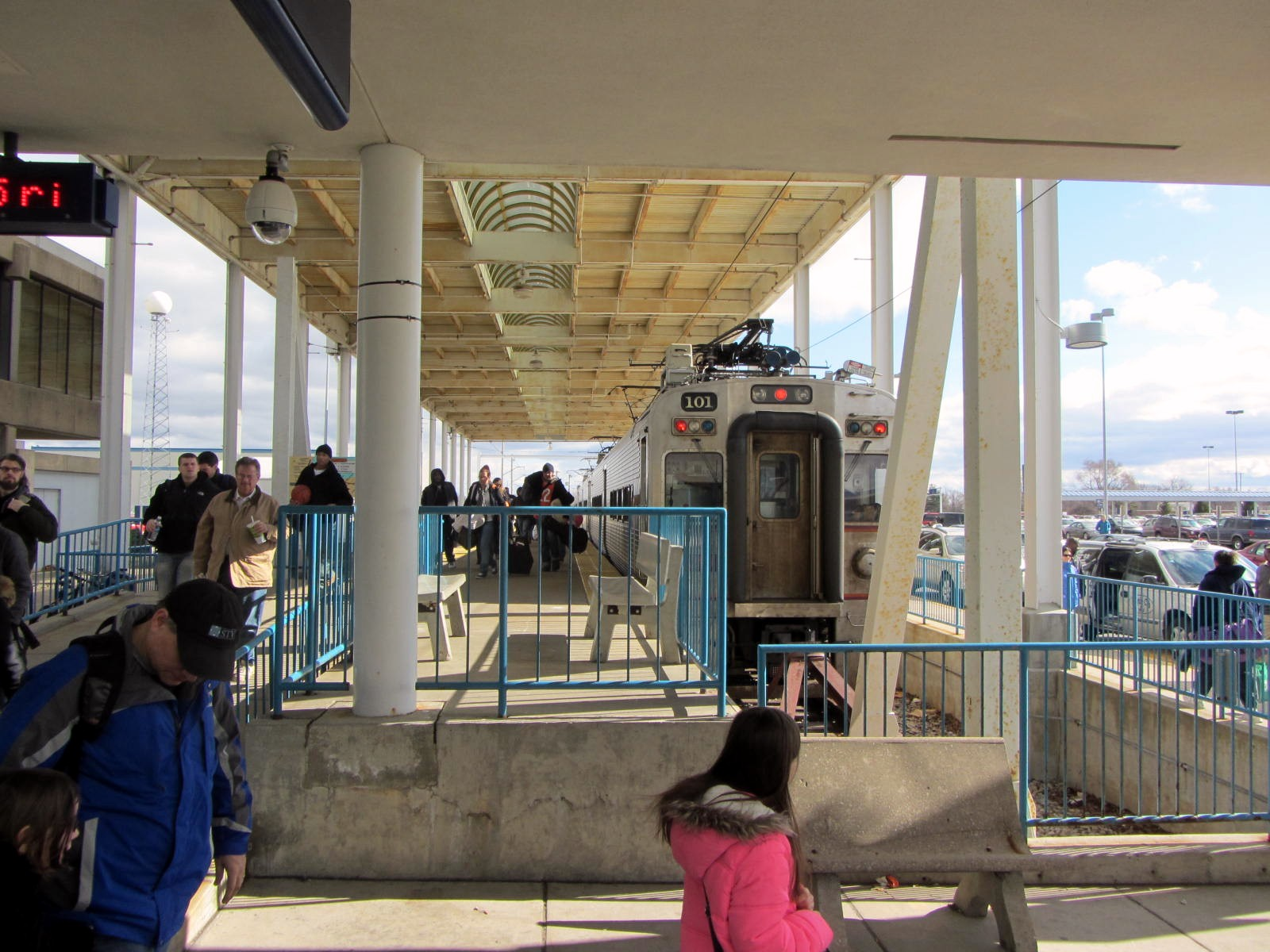
Interior view of the island platform of the South Bend Airport train station (2012)

South Bend International Airport is a commuter train station at the eastern terminus of the South Shore Line. Servicing South Bend International Airport, the station is 3 miles (4.8 km) northwest of Downtown South Bend, Indiana. In November 1992, the Airport station replaced the South Shore Line's former terminus at the South Bend Amtrak Station. The new station was constructed at a cost of $1.8 million and dedicated on November 20, 1992.

The station has a waiting room. Because the station is incorporated into the South Bend International Airport building, riders can also take advantage of its extensive lounging areas, shops and a meditation room.

== History ==
Plans to move the South Shore Line station to the airport, creating an air, bus, and rail intermodal terminal, had dated back to the mid-1970s by the airport authority. In fact, plans to move the South Shore Line station there began to be formulated very shortly after the South Shore Line moved away from its stop in the city's downtown, which required street running, and into a newly constructed station.

There were efforts in the late-1980 at pushing for the South Shore Line to be extended back into the city's downtown, with its stop being located at Union Station either instead of or in addition to stopping at the airport.

In 1989, NICTD recommended moving the station to the airport, to provide what they believed would be a safer station at a more appealing location and with a large amount of available parking. Its financial plan that year included funding for the relocation of its South Bend station to the city's airport. By 1989, the area surrounding the location of the South Bend's South Shore Line station that had been opened in the 1970s had come to be seen as an unsafe and isolated part of town. At this point, discussions had been ongoing about relocating the station to the airport for over a decade, but had been stalled by disagreement over the route that the train should take to get to the airport. In 1989, the Venango River Corp., the parent company of the Chicago South Shore and South Bend, went bankrupt and NICTD became the owner and operator of the South Shore Line. Venango's owner was said to have supported moving the station to the airport, but was also said to have championed having it take a route that would run through the Ardmore neighborhood of South Bend, approaching the airport from its west.

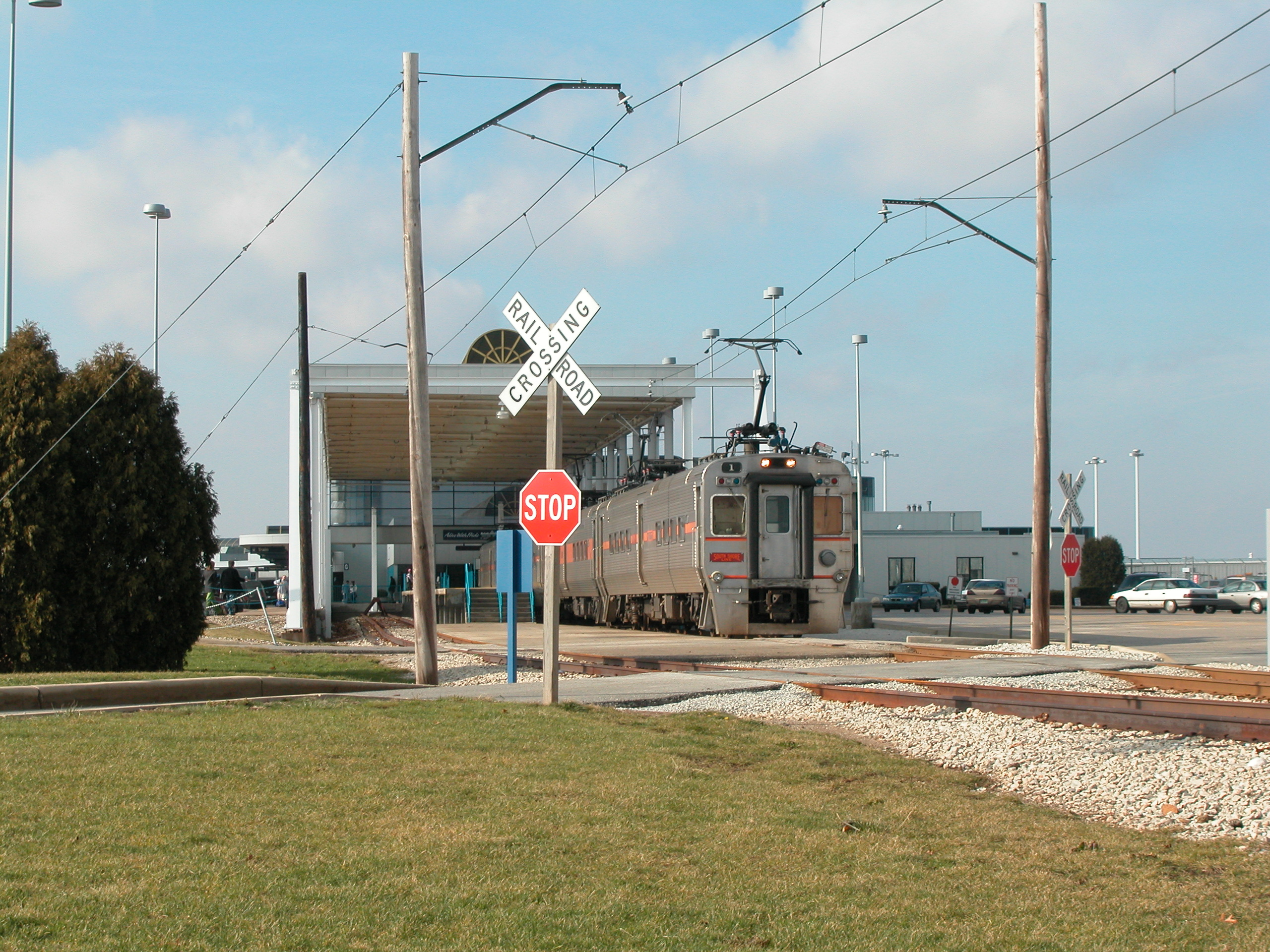
A South Shore Line train at South Bend Airport in 2004

There was hope that moving the station to the airport would position passenger air service at the airport as an alternative for northwest Indiana residents (an area also served by the South Shore Line) to Chicago's airports Midway and O'Hare. Richard Lugar, U.S. senator from Indiana, made this very argument when lobbying for the project to receive federal funding.

The station was built at the end of what had originally been an industrial freight spur for the Chicago South Shore and South Bend Railroad. This spur meets other South Shore Line trackage near Lincoln Way West. The freight spur was extended past Bendix Drive, turning to run parallel with Progress Drive in order to reach the station. Its trackage was upgraded to accommodate passenger service. The physical location of the station (on the east end of the airport terminal) was chosen due to the existence of the freight spur, but the arrangement of using a station along this spur was originally intended to be only temporary, with a replacement station to be built elsewhere at a later date. The spur's route required trains to travel slow along it, due to the tracks running parallel to a busy road (Bendix Drive), having many level crossings with side streets, and several crossings with high-traffic roadways (one with Lincoln Way West, and two with Bendix Drive). As a result, when the station opened the scheduled running-times of South Shore Line trains into South Bend were extended by five minutes compared to the scheduled running-times at the previous station.

The opening of a new station at the airport came on November 20, 1992. Approximately 200 people attended the opening ceremony. The new station cost $1.8 million, (Note: equivalent to $4.13 million in 2025 adjusted for inflation) with NICTD paying approximately $1 million (Note: equivalent to $2.29 million in 2025 adjusted for inflation) of the cost, and the rest being paid by the airport authority. The station was originally an open platform, but, as was planned from its initial construction, was later covered soon after with the construction of a new passenger terminal addition connected to the station. From its opening, the station has been accessible to those with disabilities. The station was built with a dedicated parking lot for its monthly pass holders to use. The monthly pass-holder parking lot was built in the airport's "East Ramp Area". The approach tracks to the station separated the lot from Progress Drive, requiring users to drive over a level crossing just to the east of the station in order to access the lot. The station also opened with a second railroad passenger parking lot along Progress Drive containing 36 spaces for 18-hour parking. Additionally, railroad passengers could use the main airport parking areas. Unlike at the previous station (where parking had been free), there was a fee to park in any of the parking lot options. However, the parking at the airport was well-lit and the airport offered 24-hour security, unlike the previous station which had a poorly lit parking lot located in what was described to be a "crime-ridden neighborhood". The station also opened with a "kiss and ride" drop-off area along Progress Drive that could hold approximately nine or ten cars, and which was meant for people to drop-off or pick-up railroad passengers.

With the arrival of South Shore Line trains at the airport, it became an intermodal transit center with passenger airlines, intercity bus, local Transpo buses, and railroad services. At the time of the opening, sources for NICTD claimed that the station made the airport only the second airport in the United States to be served by a commuter railroad.

Until November 27, 2009, most eastbound weekend South Shore Line trains terminated at this station. Since then, those trips have been cut in half, creating much larger gaps in service, to improve on-time performance for South Shore trains, which had suffered because the section of the line between Michigan City and South Bend is almost entirely single-tracked. Thus, if the westbound train got delayed, the eastbound train would get delayed even more because it will need to wait for the westbound train to clear the track.

== Planned replacement ==
There is a possibility that the station may be relocated or replaced. The current route that carries the South Shore Line to its existing station is considered slow and circuitous. The top contending locations for a new location are the west side of the airport and the city's downtown. By 2024, plans for a new easement into the west side of the airport were advanced, which include a new station and a reduction of NICTD's yearly payments to the airport authority. The new route is expected to reduce travel times up to 15 minutes, with construction planned for 2026–2027.

== Connections ==
=== Bus ===
Transpo

- Route 4: Lincoln Way West/Airport

Coach USA

- Tri State/United Limo routes
