= Downtown South Bend =

- Central business district
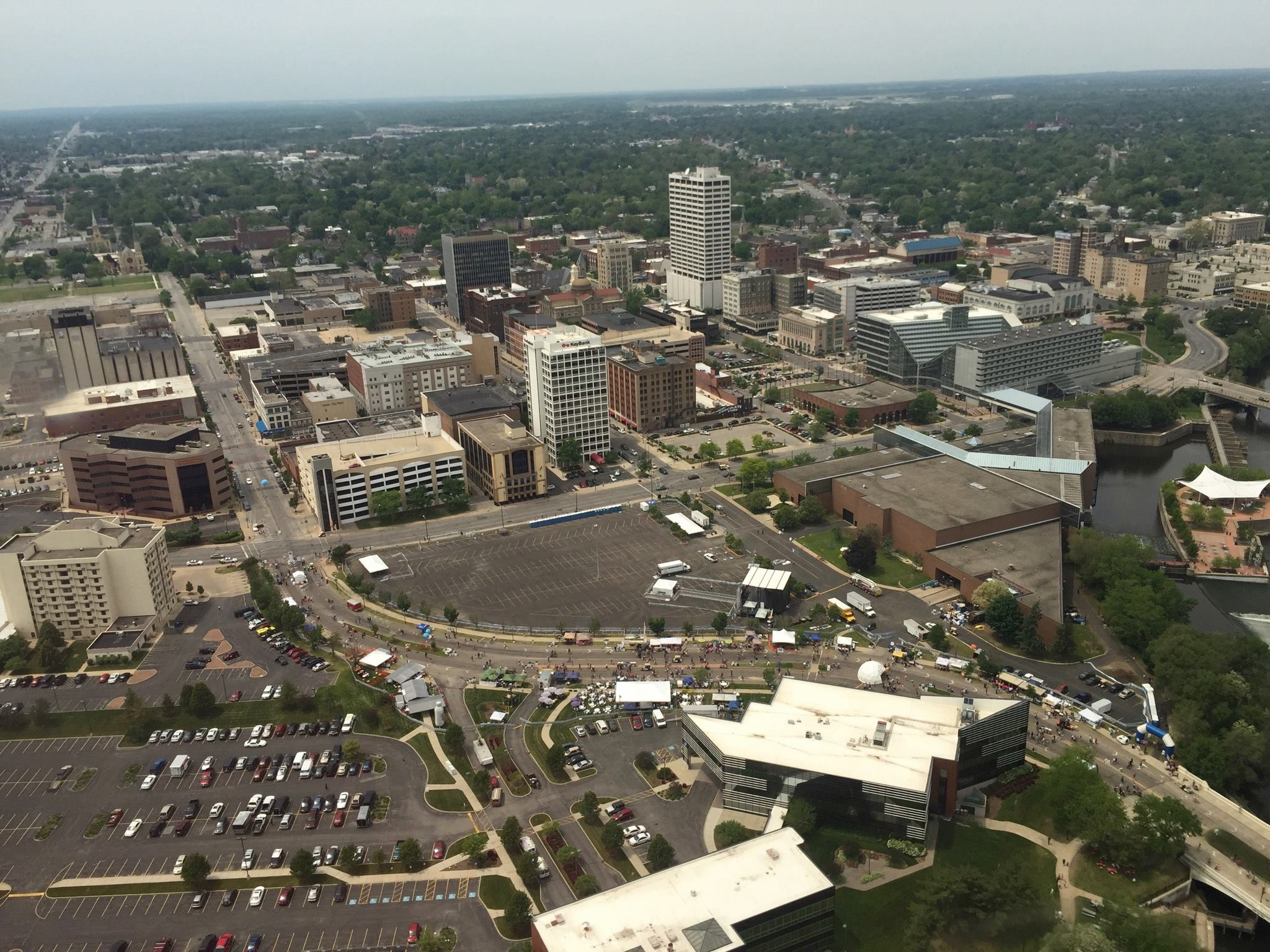
- Aerial view of downtown
- Interactive map of Downtown South Bend
- Coordinates: 41°40′35″N 86°15′01″W
- Country: United States
- State: Indiana
- City: South Bend
- Website: downtownsouthbend.com

Downtown South Bend is the central business district of South Bend, Indiana. The boundaries downtown are generally considered to be the following: on the west bank of the St. Joseph River, north of Sample Street and east of Lafayette Boulevard. It features many local businesses as well as a hospital, hotels, museums, and office buildings.

== Revitalization ==
In the 1970s, the area suffered from decreased economic activity and urban decay, but city-sponsored revitalization and reinvestment in the community has since improved downtown. Bike lanes and bus shelters have been introduced to allow for more attractive streets. Trees, small fountains, and monuments can be found here. Roundabouts and stop signs have replaced traffic lights at some intersections. Wider sidewalks featuring stone and brick have been put in place instead of concrete.

== Entertainment venues and attractions ==
Morris Performing Arts Center is a historic 2,564-seat venue that hosts the South Bend Symphony Orchestra as well as musicals, plays, concerts, and other events. The Century Center is a 75,000+ sq ft convention center on the St. Joseph River. It contains the South Bend Museum of Art and connects via underground tunnel to the former College Football Hall of Fame.

== Historic landmarks ==
Historic places in the area include:

- Farmers Security Bank building
- Morris Performing Arts Center
- Robert A. Grant Federal Building and U.S. Courthouse
- LaSalle Hotel
- LaSalle Annex
- Blackstone-State Theater
- Tower Building
- South Bend Soldiers and Sailors Monument
- Citizens Bank Building
- J.M.S. Building
- I&M Building
- Second St. Joseph County Courthouse
- Third St. Joseph County Courthouse
- Union Station

== See also ==
- Proposed South Shore Line station in South Bend
