= South Bend station =

Amtrak station in South Bend, Indiana

South Bend, IN
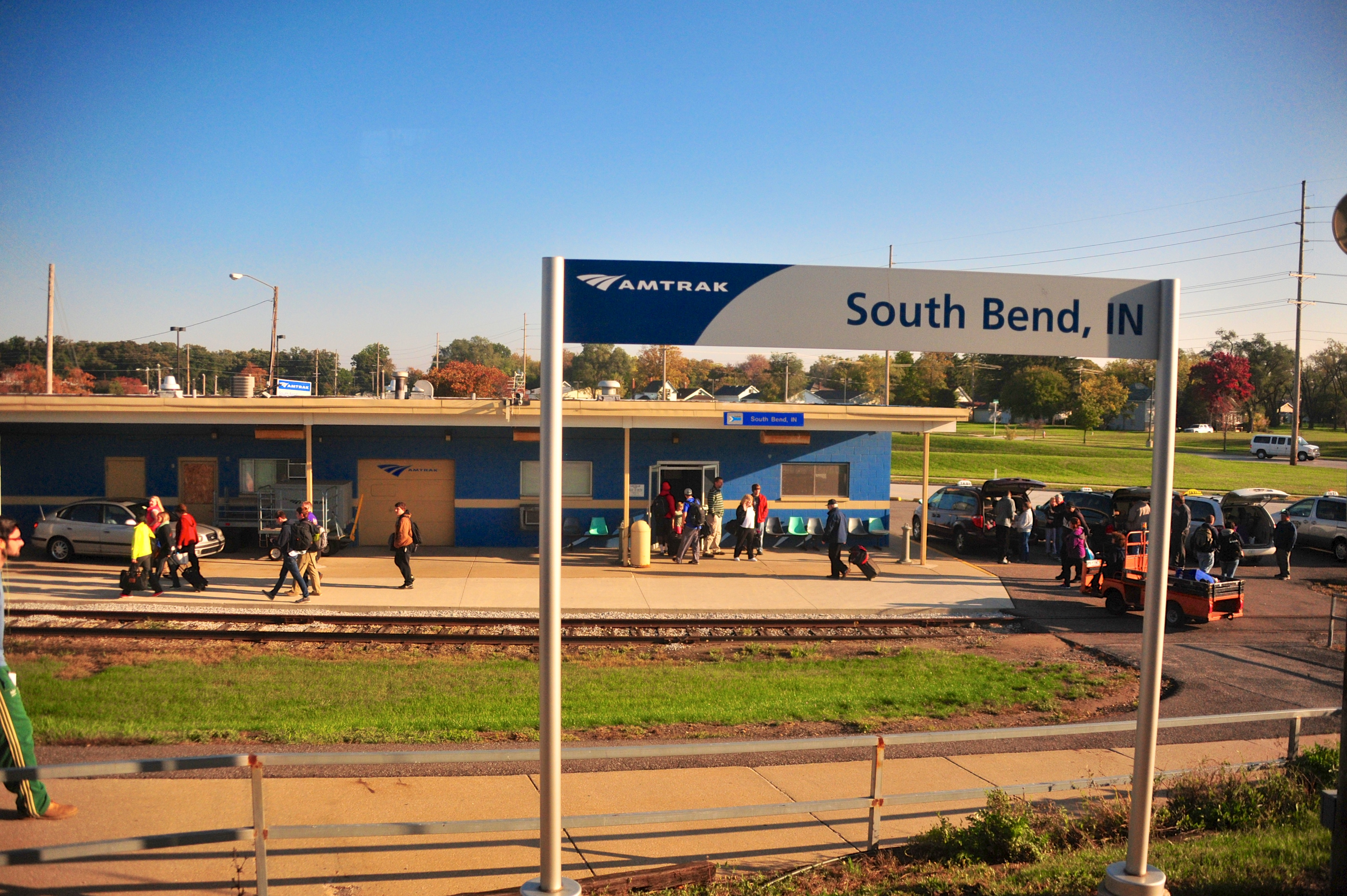

General information
- Location: 2702 West Washington Street; South Bend, Indiana; United States
- Coordinates: 41.6782°N 86.2874°W
- Owner: Northern Indiana Commuter Transportation District
- Platforms: 2 side platforms
- Tracks: 2
- Connections: South Bend TRANSPO: 2

Construction
- Parking: Yes
- Cycle facilities: Yes
- Accessible: Yes

Other information
- Station code: Amtrak: SOB

History
- Opened: July 7, 1970

Passengers
- FY 2025: 18,677 (Amtrak)

Services
Preceding station	Amtrak	Following station
Chicago Terminus	Floridian	Elkhart toward Miami
Chicago Terminus	Lake Shore Limited	Elkhart toward New York or Boston South
Former services
Preceding station	NICTD	Following station
New Carlisle toward Randolph Street	South Shore Line	Terminus
Preceding station	Amtrak	Following station
Hammond–Whiting toward Chicago	Pennsylvanian 1998–2003	Elkhart toward Philadelphia
Chicago Terminus	Lake Shore 1971–1972	Elkhart toward New York (Grand Central)
Chicago Terminus	Capitol Limited 1990–2024	Elkhart toward Washington, D.C.
Location

South Bend is a train station in South Bend, Indiana. It is served by Amtrak's Lake Shore Limited between Chicago, Boston and New York City, and Floridian between Chicago and Miami. The station was built by the Chicago South Shore and South Bend Railroad in 1970; South Shore Line trains continued to use it until 1992.

== History ==
Until 1970, South Shore Line interurbans served downtown South Bend at LaSalle and Michigan, where there had been a stop since 1908. The city had long wanted to eliminate street running, while the South Shore was looking to reduce costs as passenger traffic declined. The South Shore embarked on a program to consolidate its operations in South Bend. This included constructing the current station building at Meade and Washington and selling the old downtown station building, which had opened in 1921.

On August 7, 1969, South Bend mayor Lloyd M. Allen announced that the railroad would move its station. Allen claimed that for the past five years he had been working to persuade them to move the station. The station opened in 1970.

When Amtrak took over intercity rail service in 1971, it moved intercity rail service in South Bend to this station, away from the larger Union Station.

The South Shore Line moved its terminus to a new terminal at the South Bend International Airport in November 1992, although the track that used to terminate here was retained.

In the 1990s, there was some discussion of moving Amtrak to the Union Station. Subsequently, there were plans to build a new Amtrak station component at South Bend Transpo's South Street Station. Ultimately, this never materialized.

In the late-2010s, returning the South Shore Line to this location was studied as one of several options for replacing the current South Shore Line station.

On November 10, 2024, the Capitol Limited was merged with the Silver Star as the Floridian.
