= LaSalle Annex =

- U.S. National Register of Historic Places
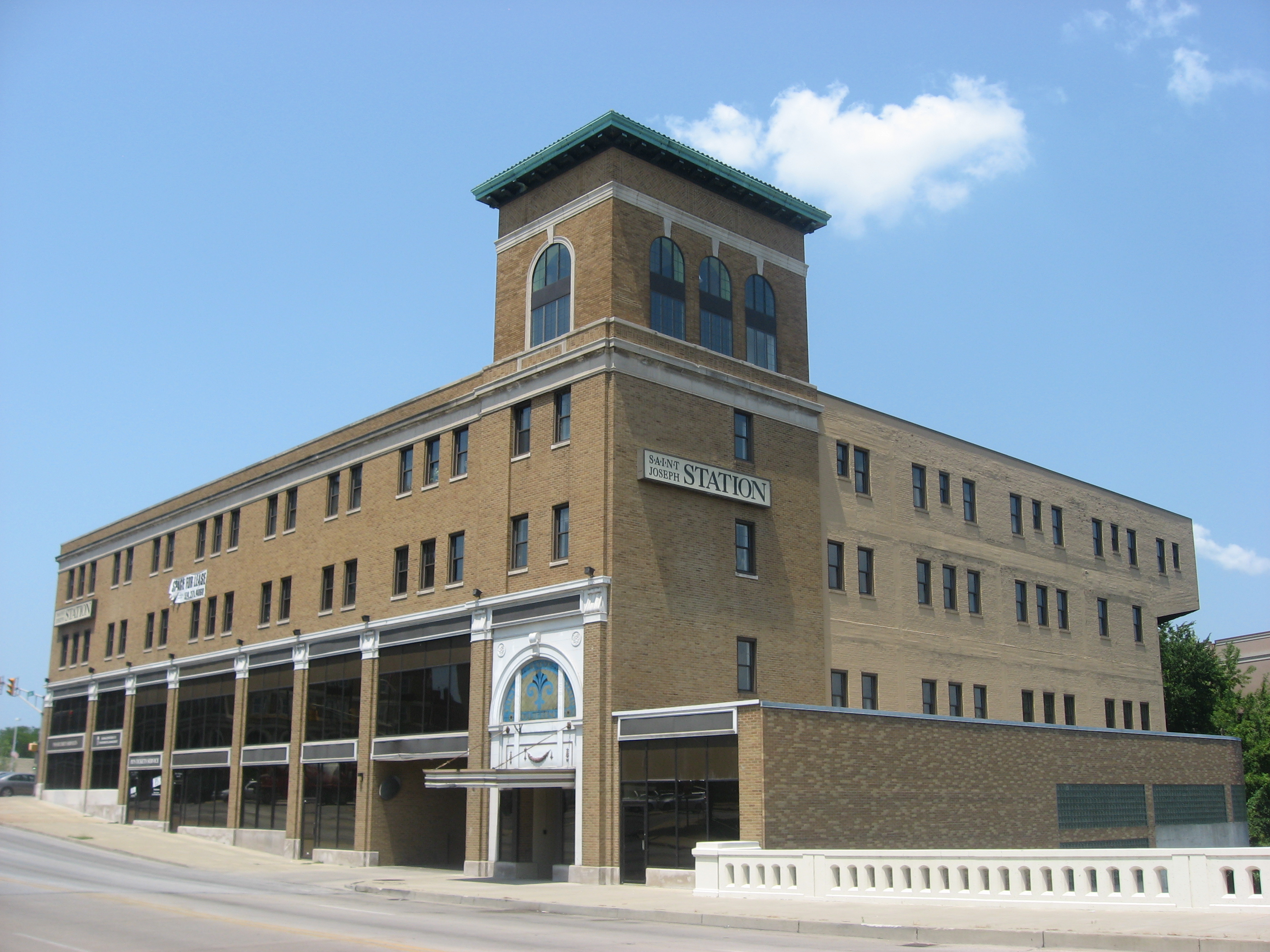
- LaSalle Annex, July 2012

- Location within Indiana Location within the United States
- Location: 306 N. Michigan, South Bend, Indiana
- Coordinates: 41°40′46″N 86°15′0″W
- Area: less than one acre
- Built: 1925
- Architect: Ellwood, Willard M.
- MPS: Downtown South Bend Historic MRA
- NRHP reference No.: 85001220
- Added to NRHP: June 5, 1985

LaSalle Annex is a historic multi-use commercial building located at South Bend, Indiana. It was built in 1925, and is a three to four-story, six bay by eight bay, building constructed of concrete, stone, and brick. It features an Italianate style tower and round arched openings. It was originally built as a multi-use building containing stores, a parking structure, hotel rooms, bachelor apartments, and a variety of large recreational facilities including a roller rink, dance floor, and bowling alley. It was originally built as an annex to the LaSalle Hotel.

It was listed on the National Register of Historic Places in 1985.
