= South Bend Transpo =

Municipal bus system serving South Bend, Indiana

Transpo (South Bend Public Transportation Corporation)

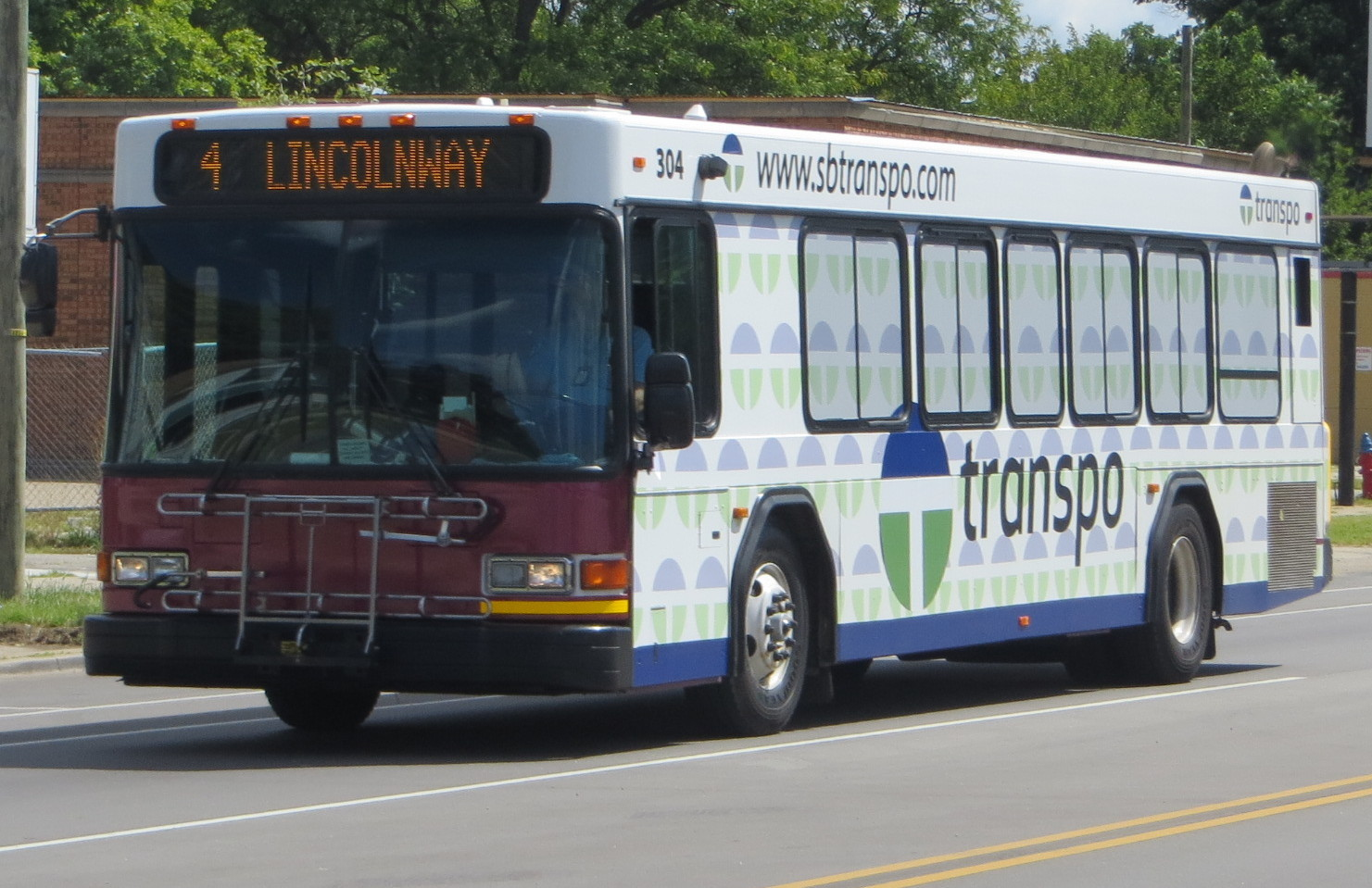
- South Bend Transpo bus in 2015
- Headquarters: 1401 S. Lafayette Blvd
- Locale: South Bend, Indiana
- Service area: South Bend & Mishawaka Metropolitan Area
- Service type: Local bus, express bus, and paratransit
- Routes: 20
- Hubs: South Street Station (South Bend) and Mishawaka Transfer Center (Mishawaka)
- Fleet: 60 vehicles
- Daily ridership: 4,500 (weekdays, Q4 2025)
- Annual ridership: 1,279,200 (2025)
- Fuel type: Biodiesel and natural gas
- Chief executive: Amy Hill, General Manager & CEO
- Website: sbtranspo.com

The South Bend Public Transportation Corporation (commonly known as Transpo) is a municipal bus system that serves the cities of South Bend and Mishawaka, as well as the nearby suburbs of Notre Dame and Roseland, in the very north of the U.S. state of Indiana. It is the most recent incarnation of the South Bend Railway Company, a street railway company that was founded on May 25, 1885. Transpo receives funding from local, state and federal taxes. In 2025, the system had a ridership of 1,279,200, or about 4,500 per weekday as of the fourth quarter of 2025.

== Overview ==
TRANSPO is a hub-and-spoke system, with routes radiating from the center towards the outward corners of the metropolitan area. It is made up of 18 fixed bus routes. It also operates an on-demand paratransit service. In Mishawaka, it serves as a de facto school bus service. South Street Station serves as a system hub, linking together most of the routes.

The system runs Monday-Saturday, operating 5:50 AM – 10:00 PM on weekdays and 6:00 AM – 6:45 PM on Saturdays. It does not operate on Sundays or major holidays. All buses are equipped with bike racks. In 2014, Transpo began converting the aging fleet to compressed natural gas (CNG) with the arrival of 14 New Flyer buses.

=== Routes ===
TRANSPO has 17 individual routes and one additional “Gameday Express” service for Notre Dame football home games.

- 1 Madison/Mishawaka
- 2 Washington/Bendix
- 3 Portage
- 4 Lincolnway/Airport
- 5 North Michigan
- 6 South Michigan
- 7 Notre Dame/University Park Mall/Mishawaka
- 8 Miami
- 10 Western
- 11 Southside Mishawaka
- 12 Rum Village
- 13 Corby/Town & Country
- 14 Sample/Mayflower
- 15 University Park Mall/Mishawaka
- 16 Blackthorn Express/II
- 17 The Sweep (shuttle service for Notre Dame campus)
- 30 South Bend/Mishawaka/Elkhart

== Fares ==
Transpo charges a base fare of $1.00 and offers reduced fares. It also sells day, two-week, and 31-day passes. Certain passes can be purchased on smartphones using the Token Transit app. The most recent fare increase was on April 5, 2010.

Students, faculty and staff at University of Notre Dame, Saint Mary's College and Holy Cross College can ride for free provided they show a valid ID. As of January 2012, Ivy Tech students can ride with a student ID and validation sticker (sticker is available for $20 from Ivy Tech).

== Connections to other transit systems ==
Route 4 stops at the South Bend International Airport, a regional transit hub served by Coach USA buses and the eponymous South Shore Line station. The South Shore Line links South Bend to the city of Chicago, making stops throughout Northern Indiana. Route 2 stops at the city's Amtrak station. Route 5 connects to Niles DART Route 2 at the Auten Rd/933 stop Monday-Friday. Route 9 links up with the Interurban Trolley system's Bittersweet/Mishawaka Route at Twin Branch Park. The route links Mishawaka to Downtown Elkhart.

== South Street Station ==
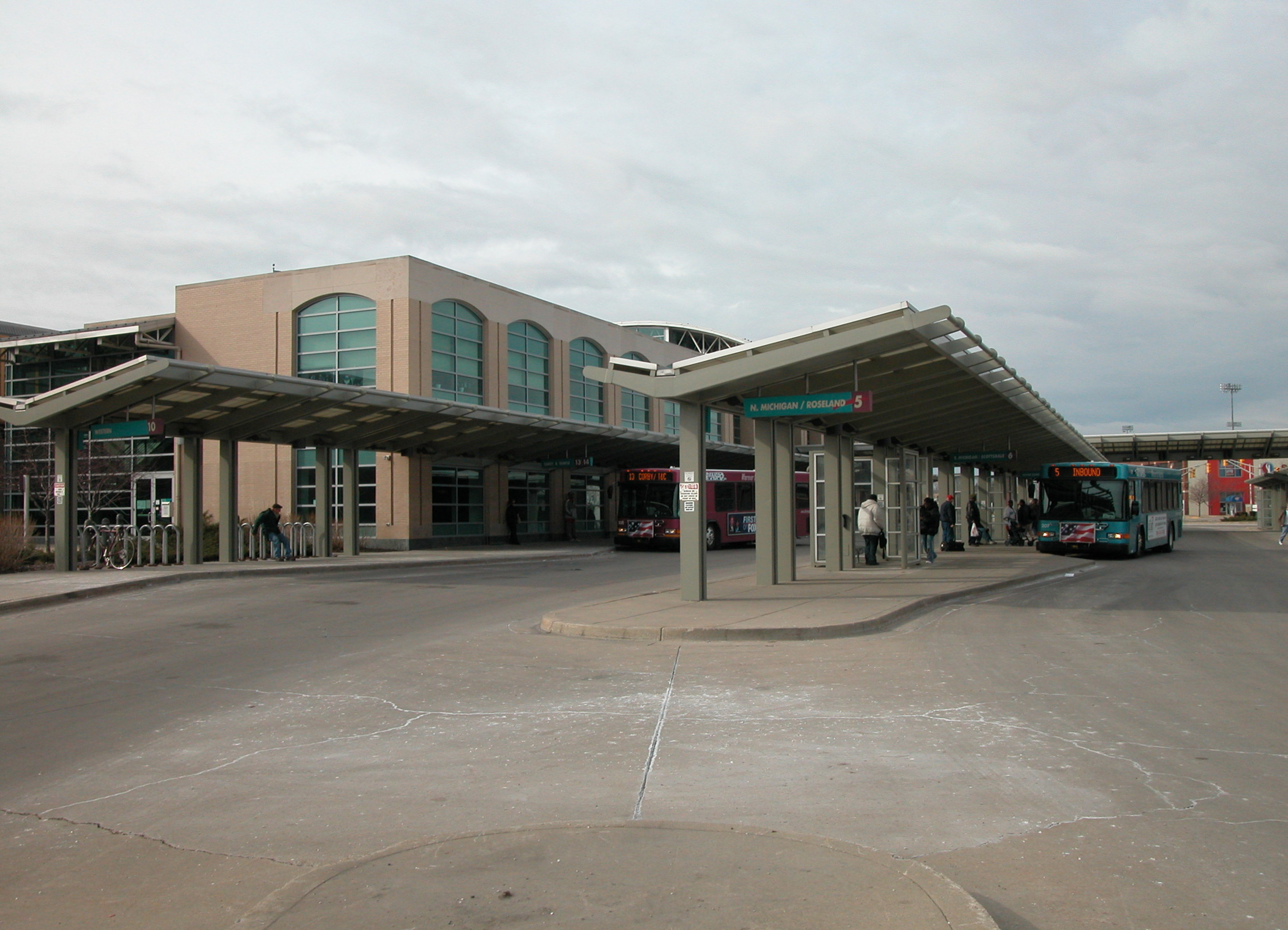
South Street Station in 2006

South Street Station is the primary hub of the system. It is located in Downtown South Bend. The station includes a 14,800 square foot (1,370 m^{2}) building containing waiting areas, public restrooms, and other facilities.

== Mishawaka Transfer Center ==
The system's secondary transfer center is the Mishawaka Transfer Center, located in Downtown Mishawaka. The station is also served by the Interurban Trolley.

In the early 2000s, there had been consideration given to moving the transfer center from its location at Fourth Street and Church Street to a location closer to the St. Joseph River. This proposal would have seen the station initially moved to location fronting First Street on the block between Mill Street and Spring Street. This block had been home to a previous Transpo transfer center that had been opened in October 1978. Plans were for this site to potentially be a temporary location, with plans to build a permanent facility on the former Uniroyal land along the St. Joseph River.
