= South Bend International Airport =

Airport in Indiana, United States

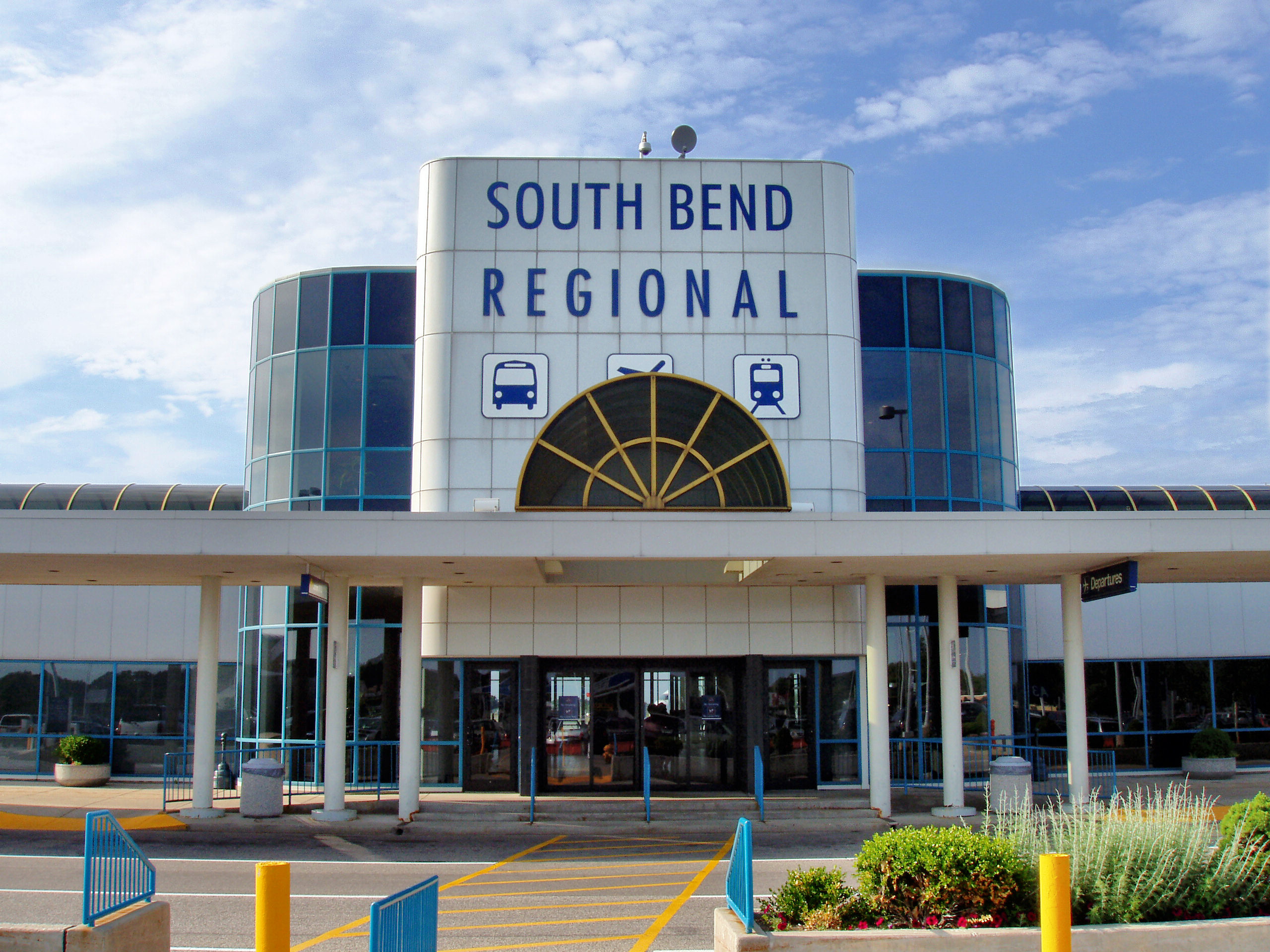
- IATA: SBN; ICAO: KSBN; FAA LID: SBN; WMO: 72535

Summary
- Airport type: Public
- Owner: St. Joseph County Airport Authority
- Serves: South Bend, Indiana; Elkhart, Indiana; Niles, Michigan; St. Joseph, Michigan
- Time zone: Eastern Standard Time (CST) (−05:00)
  - Summer (DST): Eastern Daylight Time (CDT) (−04:00)
- Elevation AMSL: 799 ft (244 m)
- Coordinates: 41°42′30″N 086°19′02″W
- Website: www.FlySBN.com

Maps
- FAA airport diagram
- Interactive map of South Bend International Airport

Runways
Direction	Length		Surface
Direction	ft	m	Surface
9L/27R	4,300	1,311	Asphalt
9R/27L	8,414	2,565	Asphalt
18/36	7,100	2,164	Asphalt

Statistics
- '24 Enplanements EOY: 451,184 ▲9.6%
- '25 Enplanements MAY YTD: 224,946 ▲28%
- '24 Air cargo (lbs): 19.2M ▼3%
- '24 FAA ATCT Ops: 44,508 ▼
- '24 FAA TRACON Ops: 165,345 ▲10%
- '24 Total FAA ATC Ops: 209,853 ▲8.1%
- '24 International GAF Ops: 86 ▼28%
- Fixed wing based aircraft: 64
- Source: South Bend Airport website and FAA

South Bend International Airport (IATA: SBN, ICAO: KSBN, FAA LID: SBN) is a commercial and freight airport located three miles northwest of downtown South Bend, in St. Joseph County, Indiana, United States. It is the state's second busiest airport in terms of passenger traffic after Indianapolis International Airport.

The National Plan of Integrated Airport Systems for 2015–2019 called it a primary commercial service facility.

Federal Aviation Administration and St. Joseph County Airport Authority records show the airport had 337,140 passenger enplanements in 2020 with an estimated total air passenger volume of over 680,000. It is owned by the St. Joseph County Airport Authority. Passengers can make connections to local public transportation services such as the South Shore Line trains to Millennium Station in Chicago and the local TRANSPO bus route #4 which travels along Lincoln Way.

== History ==
In the early days, South Bend's main airport was Cadet Field in present-day Granger. Vincent Hugo Bendix, founder of Bendix Aviation, bought land northwest of South Bend in 1929 to provide air service closer to the city. Bendix Municipal Airport opened in 1933. (Note: The airport was also known as Bendix Field.)

Bendix Airport was later called St. Joseph County Airport, then Michiana Regional Transportation Center. The airport was renamed South Bend Regional Airport on January 1, 2000, later South Bend International Airport on April 23, 2014, to help identify the airport, many travelers not knowing the meaning of Michiana (taken from "Michigan" and "Indiana").

The April 1957 OAG shows 10 weekday departures on North Central, 9 on United, 6 on Lake Central and 3 on TWA. North Central Airlines merged with Southern Airways on July 1, 1979, commencing operations with Republic from South Bend.

Until the 1980s the airport had four runways; in the 1950s runway 9 was 5000 ft, runways 6 (now taxiway A-3) and 12 (now taxiway A-4) were 4000 ft and the 3059-ft runway 18 connected the west ends of runways 6 and 12. In 1964 runway 9 was extended to 6000 ft. In January 1967 SBN got its first scheduled jets, United Caravelles flying Chicago O'Hare-South Bend-Fort Wayne-Newark and back.

On April 23, 2014, the St. Joseph County Airport Authority announced the airport was changing its name from South Bend Regional Airport to South Bend International Airport. The Airport Authority has had conversations with two airlines interested in providing service to Mexico and the Bahamas and indicated that it was looking at service to Toronto, Ireland and Europe. As part of the change, the airport will begin a $3 million (USD) project to construct a general aviation facility and a border customs area, to be financed through federal, state and airport funds.

On September 29, 2023, the U.S. Department Of Transportation awarded 20 grants under the Small Community Air Service Development Program ("Small Community Program" or "SCASDP") benefitting communities in 16 states to assist with the implementation of the air service initiatives proposed in their grant applications. Of these grants, South Bend was awarded $750,000 to expand its route network to the West Coast (Los Angeles or San Francisco) or expand routes to Washington DC.

== Administration ==
The airport is governed by the St. Joseph County Airport Authority, which is a municipality in the State of Indiana. Its four bipartisan board members are appointed by the St. Joseph County Commissioners. The Airport Authority is directed by Mike Daigle who is an accredited airport executive. Board members include Thomas S. Botkin, Abraham Marcus, David R. Sage and James V. Wyllie. The Airport Authority employs approximately 60 staff members.

The mission of the St. Joseph County Airport Authority as defined is "to maximize the safety, service, efficiency and effectiveness of South Bend International Airport for the traveling public, and to promote the value of the airport to the community."

== Facilities ==
The airport covers 2,200 acres (890 ha) at an elevation of 799 feet (244 m). It has three asphalt runways: 9L/27R is 4,300 by 75 feet (1,311 by 23 m); 9R/27L is 8,414 by 150 feet (2,565 by 46 m); 18/36 is 7,100 by 150 feet (2,164 by 46 m).

The terminal, built in 1981 and designed by HOK and Cole Associates and expanded in 2011 by Ken Herceg & Parpandy Associates, has one nine-gate concourse. The airfield saw expansive geometry changes beginning in 2020 with the re-alignment of Taxiway Bravo separate from the main terminal apron. Construction is still ongoing. Modifications taking place in 2024 also refurbished an existing gate, bringing its total gates to 9. This addition meant that the airport has eight jetways for aircraft to use (Gates 2,3,4,5,6,7,8,& 9). Amenities include cafes and restaurants, pet relief area, a concession area/lounge, a gift shop, a children's play area, a business center, and free Wi-Fi available throughout the terminal.

Despite being partially obstructed by the new concourse, the in-terminal viewing area remains open and offers live air traffic control transmissions from South Bend Air Traffic Control Tower/TRACON as well as a small airport-focused museum. The viewing area is located on the second level of the terminal's atrium adjacent to US Customs.

The airport is one of the few multi-modal transportation facilities in America that provide air, interstate bus and interstate rail service at one terminal. The St. Joseph County Airport Authority claims the airport was the first truly multi-modal airport in the country. As of 2019, interstate bus services have been moved to the downtown South Bend bus station.

June 2017 brought the grand opening of SBN's International General Aviation Facility (GAF) which cleared nearly 60 international aircraft in its first partial year of operation. On July 16, 2019, a Boeing 747 chartered by the Liverpool Soccer Club landed at South Bend from Manchester, England. This flight marked the opening of the Federal Inspection Station (FIS). On the same day, US Customs and Border Patrol announced South Bend International Airport would be the state's first Global Entry Enrollment Center.

A $105 million, seven-year rehabilitation project at SBN was completed in September 2025, focusing on reconfiguring taxiways and ramps to accommodate larger mainline aircraft at all nine gates. This modernization included extensive infrastructure upgrades—like 137,000 feet of cabling and 475 LED light fixtures—to support increased, efficient air traffic.

The airport is a maintenance base for regional carrier SkyWest Airlines.

== Operations ==
Within Indiana, the airport is second in passenger enplanements (417,929) after Indianapolis International (4,375,317). South Bend International overtook Fort Wayne International in 2019 (397,938) to reclaim second place. The airport is in second place behind Indianapolis in cargo operations and third in the state for overall take-offs and landings. Due to South Bend's proximity to Chicago, South Bend air traffic controllers work closely with Chicago Center and Chicago Approach Control to sequence aircraft into and out of Chicago's terminal airspace. These efforts make South Bend's Tower/TRACON the second busiest terminal air traffic facility in the state and one of the busiest in the region.

In 2019 the airport handled 47,756 aircraft operations, averaging 130 per day. The TRACON handled over 150,000 operations in 2019.

According to the 2007 Economic Impact Report from the Aviation Authority of Indiana, the airport's annual economic impact on South Bend and surrounding communities was in excess of $433.7 million. SBN's annual contribution to the Indiana economy is estimated at more than $1.4 billion.

== Ground transportation ==
=== Rail ===
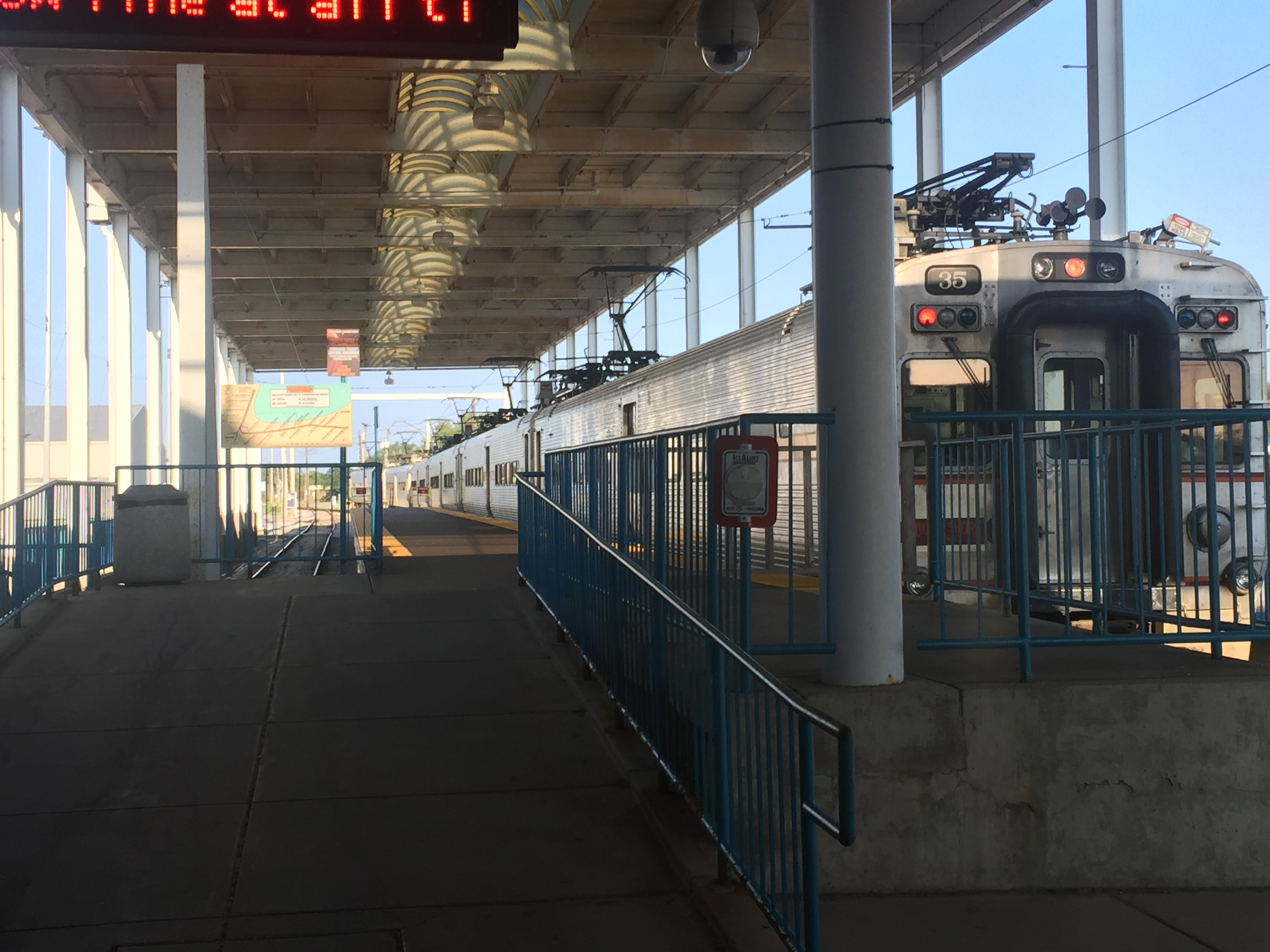
A South Shore Line train at the South Bend International Airport station

The South Shore Line commuter rail runs from South Bend International Airport station to Millennium Station in Chicago, with express services taking 1 hour and 55 minutes.

There are plans to relocating the station either to a different side of the airport via a new alignment.

=== Bus ===
South Bend Transpo Route 4 connects the airport with downtown South Bend six days a week, with a full schedule Monday through Friday and a reduced schedule on Saturday. There is no service on Sunday.

== Airlines and destinations ==
=== Passenger ===
Airlines	Destinations
Allegiant Air	Fort Lauderdale, Knoxville, Las Vegas, Orlando/Sanford, Phoenix/Mesa, Punta Gorda (FL), St. Petersburg/Clearwater; Seasonal: Sarasota
American Eagle	Charlotte, Chicago–O'Hare, Dallas/Fort Worth
Breeze Airways	Fort Myers, Orlando, Washington–Dulles
Delta Connection	Atlanta, Detroit, Minneapolis/St. Paul
United Express	Chicago–O'Hare, Washington–Dulles

Passenger destinations map
Passenger destinations from South Bend International Airport
Red = Year-round destination
Green = Seasonal destination
Blue = Future destination

=== Cargo ===
Airlines	Destinations
FedEx Express	Memphis
FedEx Feeder operated by CSA Air	Indianapolis

== Statistics ==
Top 10 domestic destinations (July 2025 – June 2026)
Rank	Airport	Passengers	Airlines
1	Chicago–O'Hare, Illinois	99,920	United
2	Atlanta, Georgia	62,140	Delta
3	Charlotte, North Carolina	54,600	American
4	Dallas–Fort Worth, Texas	52,820	American
5	Orlando–Sanford, Florida	37,610	Allegiant
6	Punta Gorda/Fort Myers, Florida	37,210	Allegiant
7	Detroit, Michigan	35,760	Delta
8	Washington–Dulles, Virginia	26,570	Breeze, United
9	St. Petersburg/Clearwater, Florida	22,550	Allegiant
10	Phoenix/Mesa, Arizona	22,070	Allegiant

Carrier Shares for July 2025 – June 2026
Carrier	Passengers (arriving and departing)
Skywest	525,000(48.79%)
Allegiant	329,000(30.55%)
PSA Airlines	127,000(11.76%)
Breeze	48,950(4.55%)
Mesa	23,190(2.15%)
Other	23,720(2.20%)

Annual passenger enplanements at SBN, 2000 – 2023
Year	Passengers	Year	Passengers
2000	432,439	2011	305,386
2001	375,817	2012	299,592
2002	409,319	2013	328,992
2003	404,607	2014	311,158
2004	397,565	2015	315,313
2005	349,847	2016	328,897
2006	378,909	2017	305,491
2007	398,500	2018	368,377
2008	357,168	2019	417,929
2009	318,974	2020	209,214
2010	317,096	2021	341,343
		2022	363,078
		2023	411,377

== Incidents ==
- On April 4, 2011, a pilot flying from Chicago Executive Airport attempted to land a rented Cirrus SR22, but was hit by a gust of wind on approach. The plane landed on the left wing, cart-wheeled and came to a stop 250 feet (76 m) from the runway. He was hospitalized in critical condition, with no one else on board. He later died from his injuries.
- On March 17, 2013, a private jet crashed into three homes near South Bend Regional Airport. Two of the four people on the plane were killed while the other two on board, and one person on the ground, were injured.
- On September 12, 2017, a Beech N35 Bonanza made a forced landing due to fuel exhaustion into a ditch just short of the airport perimeter fence. No injuries were reported, the aircraft was a total loss.
- On May 25, 2018, SkyWest (Delta Connection) Flight 4647 made an emergency landing in South Bend after a halon bottle exploded in the cargo bin. The aircraft had just departed South Bend bound for Atlanta. None of the passengers or crew on board were injured.
- On May 15, 2023, a SkyWest Airlines flight made an emergency landing after departing South Bend. The aircraft experienced a mechanical failure soon after takeoff, remained in the air to burn fuel, and returned to land at South Bend.

== See also ==
- Indiana World War II Army Airfields
- List of airports in Indiana
