= Union Station (South Bend) =

Railway station in South Bend, Indiana

South Bend
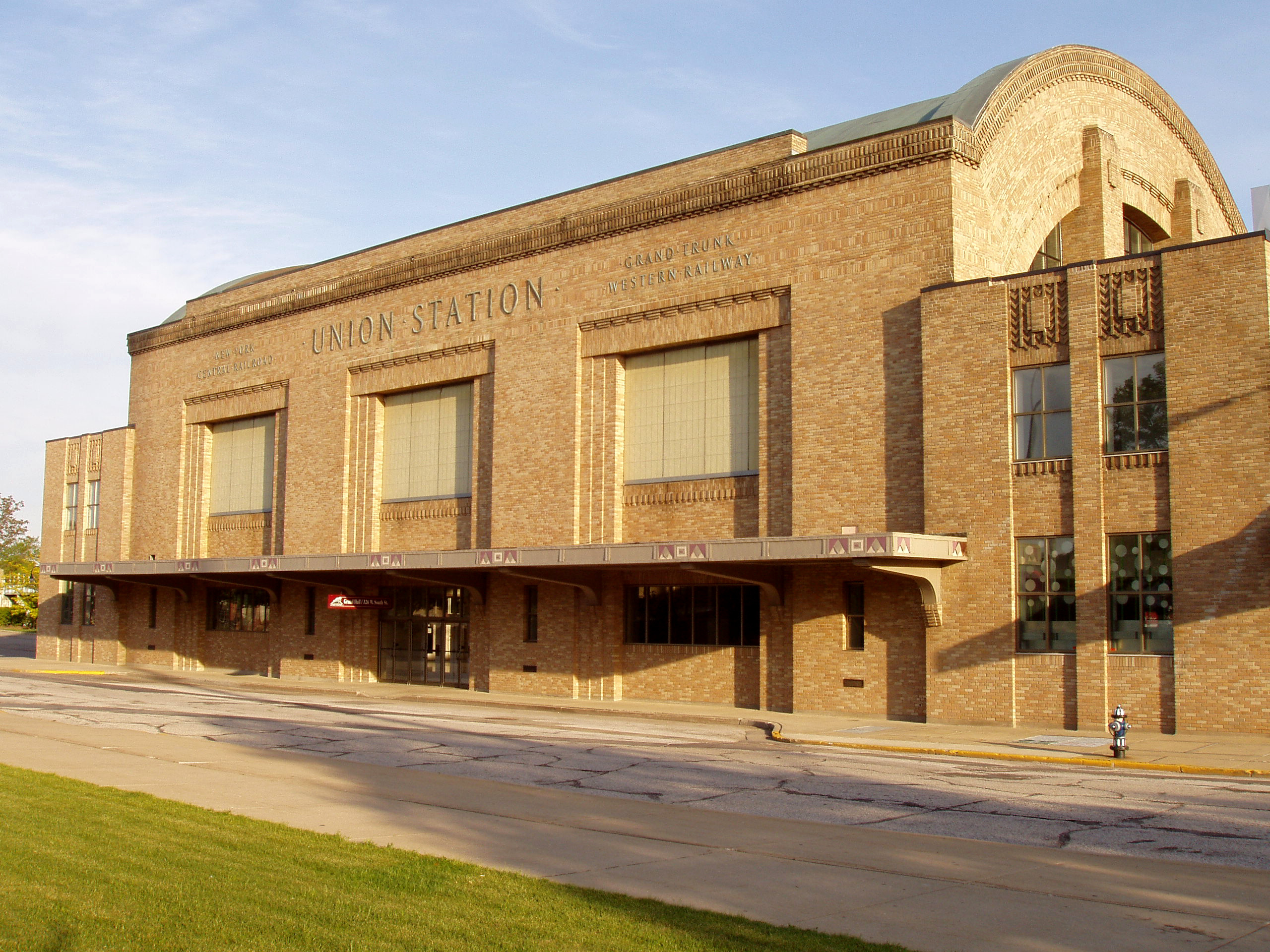
- Exterior of Union Station

General information
- Location: 326 West South Street; South Bend, Indiana
- Coordinates: 41°40′9.59″N 86°15′17.10″W
- Platforms: 3
- Tracks: 5

Construction
- Structure type: Art Deco architecture

History
- Opened: 1929
- Closed: 1971

Former services
Preceding station	New York Central Railroad	Following station
Lydick toward Chicago	Main Line	Mishawaka toward New York
North Liberty toward Zearing	Kankakee Belt Route	Terminus
Lydick toward St. Joseph	St. Joseph – South Bend	Terminus
Niles toward Benton Harbor	Benton Harbor – South Bend	Terminus
Preceding station	Grand Trunk Western Railroad	Following station
Olivers toward Chicago	Main Line	Studebaker toward Port Huron
Location

South Bend Union Station is a former union train station in South Bend, Indiana in the United States.

== History ==
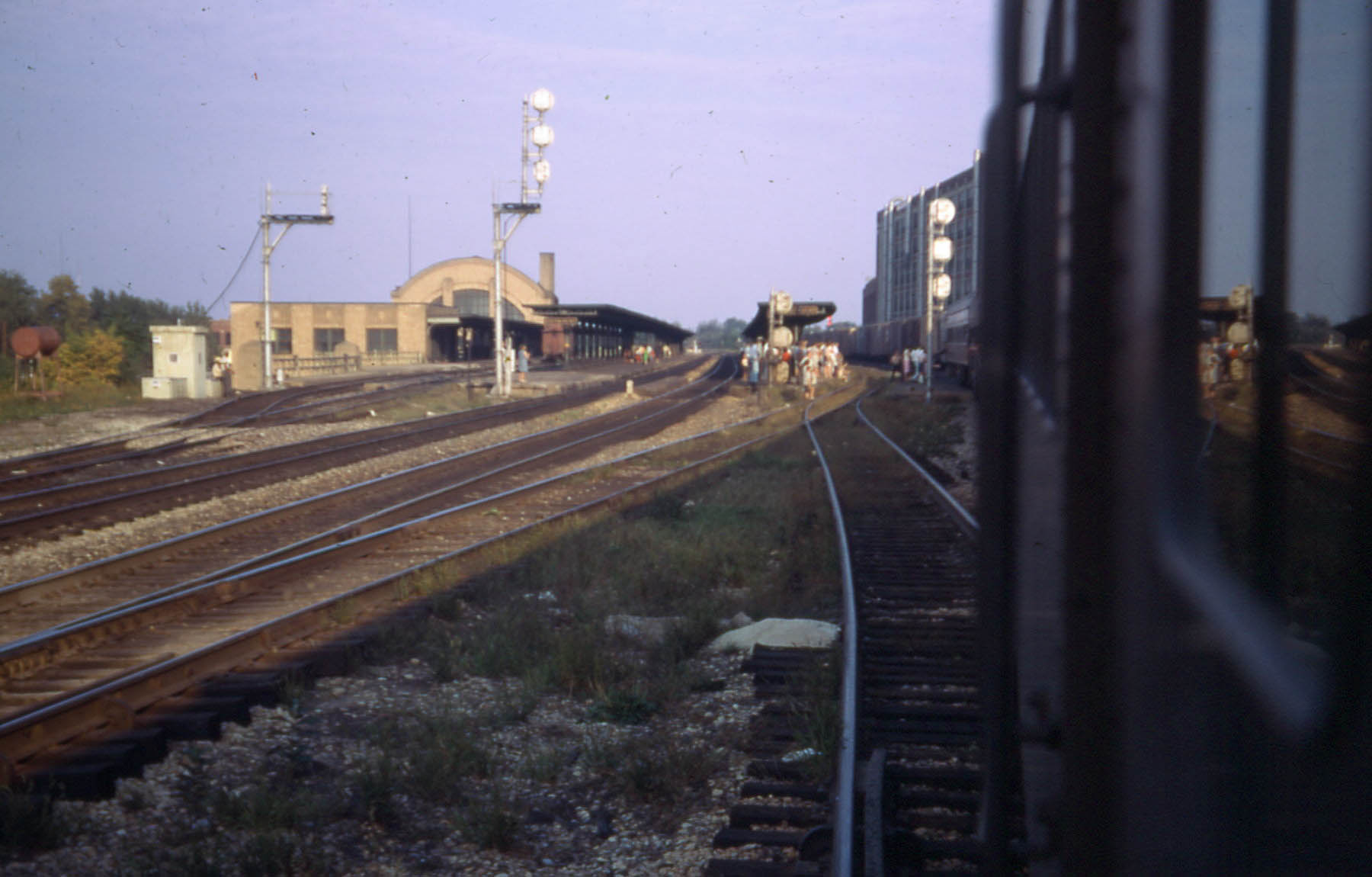
A New York Central train approaches South Bend Union Station

Opened in 1929 and situated across the tracks from the Studebaker auto plant, the building served the New York Central Railroad and Grand Trunk Western Railroad. It was designed by the architectural firm Fellheimer & Wagner. NYC's Detroit-Chicago "Great Steel Fleet" and GTW's Chicago-Canada trains used this station.

When the New York Central merged with the Pennsylvania Railroad in 1968 to make the Penn Central Transportation Company, it used the station as well. The last trains departed in 1971 when newly created Amtrak moved its operations to the South Shore Line station on the city's western outskirts about 1.8 miles (2.9 km) west of Union Station constructed by the Chicago South Shore and South Bend Railroad a year earlier in 1970.

For several years after train service ceased, the abandoned station fell into poor repair, suffering heavy vandalism and losing portions of its copper roof to metal theft. The building was purchased by South Bend native and University of Notre Dame graduate Kevin M. Smith in 1979. Smith built a large data center for his venture Global Access Point in a large adjoining building, which he renovated to become a data center, housing computing equipment from outside companies. The Technology Center is a state-of-the-art hub for digital information, providing a location for small businesses, data centers, data transport and carrier operations. The railway corridor adjacent to the station carries not only trains, but also a fiber-optic trunkline. The Union Station Technology Center functions as a colocation center. Smith restored and maintained the station's interior spaces, which were used for office space (in upper floors) and as a grand entrance space to the data center. It was also used as an events space (rented for weddings and proms).

There were several unsuccessful efforts over the years to return rail service to the station. In the late-1980s, at the same time as efforts to move the city's South Shore Line station to its airport, there were also efforts to have the train line brought back to the city's downtown with a stop at Union Station. In the early 1990s, then-mayor Joe Kernan expressed hope that the city might be able to successfully negotiate with Amtrak to secure a return of train service to the station.

In November 2019, the South Bend Tribune, the city's 147-year-old daily newspaper, temporarily moved its offices into the building. The Tribune previously had been located at 225 West Colfax Avenue in South Bend. In 2020, the newspaper moved its office to a permanent space into Studebaker Building 113 in the nearby Renaissance District, which was also owned by Smith.

In July 2024, the South Bend Redevelopment Commission acquired the station for $2.4 million, with an eye of potentially returning Amtrak service to the facility. In September 2024, the data center component was sold to Fifteenfortyseven Critical Systems. In August 2026 the city received a Federal Railroad Administration grant to cover 80% or the costs for the planning and development needed to restore passenger service to the station.

== See also ==
- Proposed new South Shore Line station in South Bend
- Union Station (disambiguation)
