= Elizabeth Fletcher Allen =

American attorney, civil rights activist

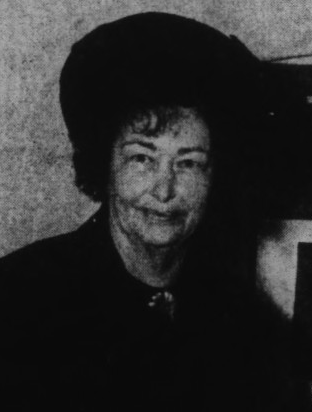
- Born: September 16, 1905; Chicago, Illinois
- Died: December 23, 1994 (aged 89)
- Education: Talladega College; Boston University
- Occupation: Attorney
- Spouse: J. Chester Allen
- Children: 2

Elizabeth Fletcher Allen was an attorney, civil rights activist, and the first Black woman attorney in both the city of South Bend and the state of Indiana. She represented St. Joseph county in the Indiana House of Representatives from 1939 until 1943. Elizabeth used her Juris Doctor degree to advocate and fight for justice. She contributed to the desegregation of the Engman Public Natatorium. She criticized the 1935 shooting of an unarmed Black man, Arthur Owens, by a white South Bend police officer. She also wrote a letter to and received a reply from then-first lady Eleanor Roosevelt to encourage integrated housing. She set a great example for the women of South Bend wanting to pursue a career path in the legal profession.

== Early life ==
Allen was born on September 16, 1905 in Chicago, Illinois. She got her bachelor's degree from Talladega College and obtained her J.D. from Boston University.

== Career ==
Allen was admitted to the bar in 1938. Allen and her husband, J. Chester Allen, founded the Allen & Allen law firm. They were one of the first husband and wife law partners in South Bend. In the mid-twentieth century, it was common for recreational spaces, likes parks and playgrounds to be racially segregated. Allen and her husband fought for desegregation in the town of South Bend. The South Bend Engman Public Natatorium was built in 1922 and for the first 14 years after its establishment, only white people could access the pool. In 1931, the Allens started taking action to help Black people gain access to the pool. They petitioned the state tax commission demanding that the African American community, as taxpayers, have access to the pool supported by their taxes. After 16 years, the community finally gained access to the pool, but only on Mondays when there were no white people present. In February 1950, Allen and her husband along with another attorney, Maurice Tulchinsky, represented the NAACP before the South Bend Park Board and that was the turning point of the desegregation process. The natatorium closed in 1970 and is now the locations of the Civil Rights Heritage Center in South Bend.

Allen was a member of the Alpha Kappa Alpha sorority. Her civic contributions also included a variety of community organizations focused on the advancement of people of color and civil rights, including the South Bend chapter of the National Association for the Advancement of Colored People (NAACP) and the Black Business and Professional Women's Association. She led a workshop with the Black Business and Professional Women's Association entitled "The Role of Business and Professional Women in the War on Poverty". Allen also helped bring equity to war contracts in Michiana industries for both African Americans and women during World War II. The Allen law firm took pro-bono cases for those who could not afford lawyers.

== Personal life ==
Allen married J. Chester Allen on March 6, 1928 in Plaistow, New Hampshire. The couple moved to South Bend three years after their marriage. The couple had two children together, Dr. Irving Allen and J. Chester Allen, Jr.

Allen died on December 23, 1994.
