= First Presbyterian Church (South Bend, Indiana) =

Historic church in Indiana, United States

- Former First Presbyterian Church
- U.S. National Register of Historic Places
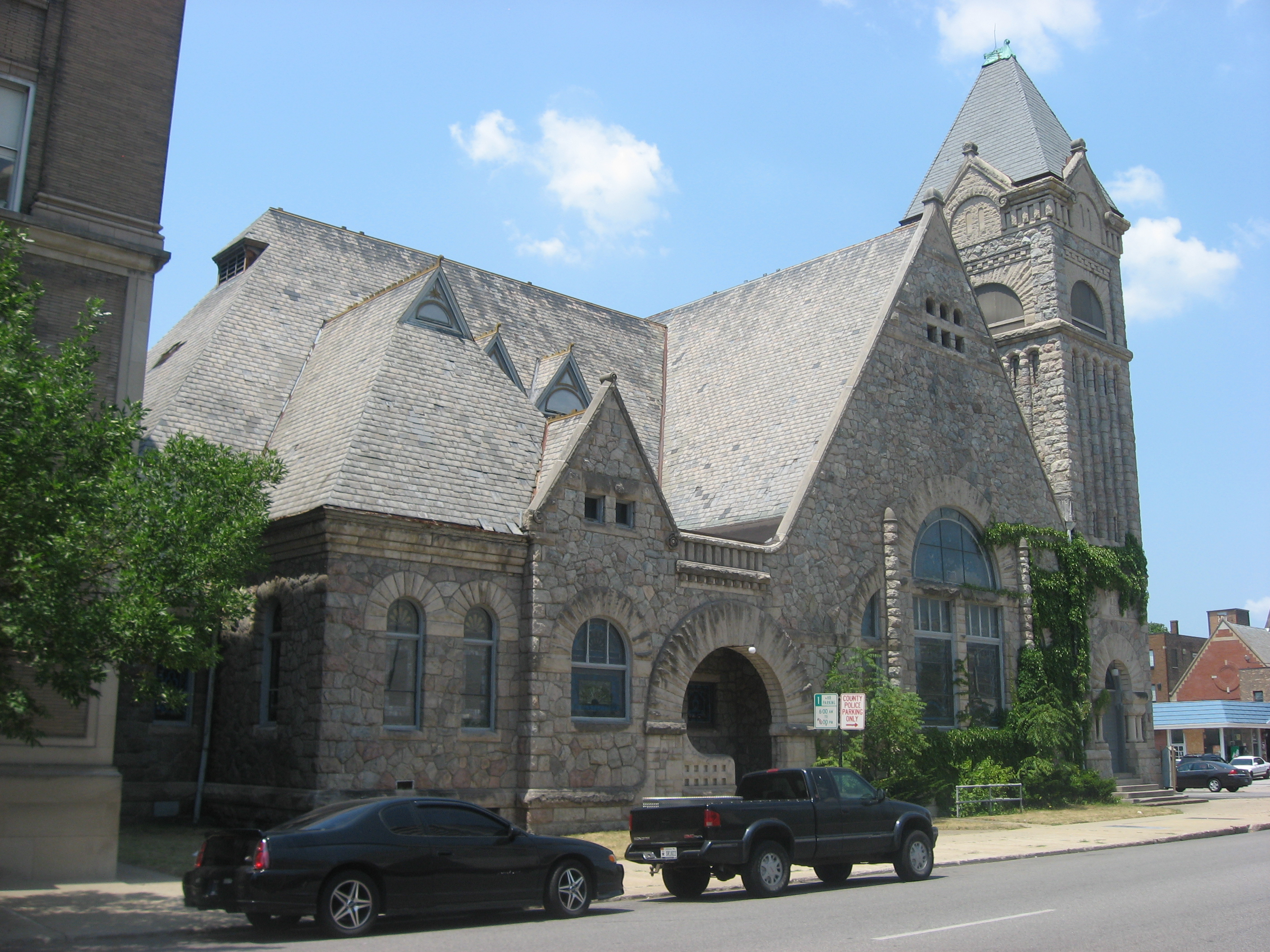

- Location within Indiana Location within the United States
- Location: 101 S. Lafayette, South Bend, Indiana
- Coordinates: 41°40′34″N 86°15′13″W
- Area: less than one acre
- Built: 1888
- Architect: J.P. Bailey; Christopher Fassnacht
- Architectural style: Romanesque
- MPS: Downtown South Bend Historic MRA
- NRHP reference No.: 85001211
- Added to NRHP: June 5, 1985

The First Presbyterian Church at 101 S. Lafayette in South Bend, Indiana is a former Presbyterian church building of First Presbyterian Church. It was built in 1888 and is a Richardsonian Romanesque style building constructed of fieldstone with limestone trim. It has a cross-gable roof and features arched entrances, a massive Palladian window of stained glass, and a corner bell tower.

It was listed on the National Register of Historic Places in 1985 as Former First Presbyterian Church.

The congregation of First Presbyterian Church is currently located at 333 W. Colfax Ave in downtown South Bend. The current church was completed in 1952.
