= South Bend Common Council =

City council; lawmaking body of the City of South Bend

Type
- Type: Unicameral Municipal Legislature

Leadership
- President: Canneth Lee (D)

Structure
- Political groups: Majority (9); Democratic (9)

Elections
- Last election: November 7, 2023

Meeting place
- County-City Building

Website
- https://southbendin.gov/department/common-council/

The South Bend Common Council is the City of South Bend's legislative branch. It consists of nine council members, six representing a district of the city, and additional more at-large councilpersons.

== History ==
The Common Council was initiated by the incorporation of the City of South Bend on May 22, 1865. The first members were elected to the council on June 5 that same year. The council currently meets in the County-City Building, a fifteen-story building in the heart of downtown. The building houses City and County offices. For the much past several decades, the Democrats have had a majority on the council. This is partially due to South Bend's diverse and urbanized population which has traditionally favored modern liberalism.

== Procedure ==
Per Indiana state law, the council may pass resolutions and ordinances. Resolutions relate to internal council procedures, while ordinances address municipal codes. If a bill is approved, it is sent to the mayor (James Mueller) to be signed into law. They mayor can veto, but a six-vote majority can override this action.

== Current council ==
The Common Council currently has a 9-0 Democratic majority. There is also, as of 2024, a 7-2 female preponderance. Councilpersons serve four-year terms. Canneth Lee, a member of the council since 2020, serves as its president. On May 20, 2026, Heidi Beidinger was chosen to fill the remainder of Troy Warner's term by the St. Joseph County Democratic Party after Mueller appointed Warner as Chief of Staff.

District	Member	Party	Elected
1	Canneth Lee	Democratic	2020
2	Ophelia Gooden-Rodgers.	Democratic	2023
3	Sharon McBride	Democratic	2018
4	Heidi Beidinger	Democratic	2019
5	Sherry Bolden-Simpson	Democratic	2023
6	Shelia Niezgodski	Democratic	2019
At-Large	Oliver Davis	Democratic	2023
At-Large	Rachel Tomas Morgan	Democratic	2019
At-Large	Karen White	Democratic	1999

== Committees ==
The council has multiple committees including;

- Community Investment
- Community Relations
- Council Rules
- Health and Public Safety
- Information and Technology
- PARC (Parks, Recreation, Cultural Arts, & Entertainment)
- Personnel Finance
- Public Works and Property Vacation
- Residential Neighborhoods
- Utilities
- Zoning and Annexation

== Upcoming elections ==
The next election for Common Council election will be held on Tuesday, November 2, 2027.

== 2021 investigations ==
In early 2021, the St. Joseph County Democratic Party Chairman at the time, Steve Wruble, requested that Mayor James Mueller investigate two council members (Shelia Niezgodski and Canneth Lee) for non-city related income. His March 1 letter to the mayor asked the city to probe Niezgodski and Lee for alleged violation of city law. The letter (which was publicly released on March 5) also cited voter mistrust within the local Democratic Party, of which all the aforementioned politicians are affiliated with. Wruble wrote: “even a perceived conflict of interest can leave serious political fallout and lead to voter mistrust.” Mueller, a critic of Wruble, delivered a message that highlighted the fact that the private sector jobs of Lee and Niezgodski were well known before the two were elected, and that city attorneys had previously reviewed those jobs for any ethics violations.
