= Alexis Coquillard =

American fur trader and explorer (1795–1855)

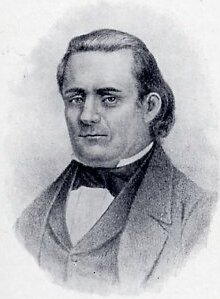
- Born: September 28, 1795; Detroit, Northwest Territory, U.S.
- Died: January 8, 1855 (aged 59); South Bend, Indiana, U.S.
- Resting place: Cedar Grove Cemetery; Notre Dame, Indiana, U.S.
- Occupations: Fur trader; explorer
- Spouse: Frances C. Comparet
- Children: 1

Alexis Coquillard (September 28, 1795 – January 8, 1855) was an American fur trader, explorer, and the founder of South Bend, Indiana.

== Early life ==
Alexis Coquillard was born on September 28, 1795, in Detroit. He fought in the War of 1812 under William Henry Harrison.

His parents, Alexis Cerat (Serat) dit Coquillard and Cecile Tremblay, were born in Montreal, as were his paternal grandparents, Jean-Baptiste Cerat dit Coquillard (1716–1771) and Marie-Madeleine Jourdain (1719–1791).

== Career ==
After the war, Coquillard moved to the St. Joseph River valley in 1823. Coquillard was involved in the treaties with the Tippecanoe and Chicago after the 1814 peace.

Coquillard was a friend to Father Edward Sorin, and was instrumental in the founding of the University of Notre Dame in 1842. His nephew, Alexis T. Coquillard, was one of the first students of the university.

Coquillard had been a fur trader, an industry heavily dependent on Native American labor. In the period after Indian removal, he became a removal contractor, known as a “conductor,” capturing individuals who had evaded removal. In 1839, Coquillard built the first mill in South Bend with John A. Hendricks and John Rush. He also built a second flour mill called the Merchant's Mill. He established the Kankakee Race.

In 1840, Coquillard was appointed to assist with the removal of the Potawatomi. Coquillard and Lathrop M. Taylor gifted land for the South Bend City Cemetery.

== Personal life ==
Coquillard married Frances C. Comparet of Detroit. They had one child, Alexis T.

Coquillard died following a head injury from a beam falling during a fire at his mill on January 6, 1855. He died on January 8, 1855, at the age of 59. He was buried at Cedar Grove Cemetery on the Notre Dame campus.
