= Engman Public Natatorium =

Public swimming pool in South Bend, Indiana, US

Coordinates: 41°40′33.5″N 86°15′56.9″W

The Engman Public Natatorium was a public swimming pool that operated in South Bend, Indiana, between 1922 and 1978. Sources describe it as being the largest indoor swimming pool in the state of Indiana when it first opened in 1922. The pool has a history of racial exclusion, barring African Americans completely between 1922 and 1936, then segregating against them (by day) between 1936 and 1950.

In 2010, after sitting vacant since 1978, the building re-opened as the home of the Indiana University South Bend's Civil Rights Heritage Center. As of 2016, the Center continues to operate out of the building. They offer tours and share the history of segregation and civil rights in South Bend, as well as the experiences of the African American, Latinx, and LGBTQ communities in the city.
