= Civil Rights Heritage Center =

Coordinates: 41°40′33.5″N 86°15′56.9″W

The Civil Rights Heritage Center (CRHC) is an institution established by Indiana University South Bend as a result of student interest and faculty support as a center for the study and documentation of local civil rights history. Through community involvement, students, faculty, and community members joined forces to push for the restoration of a public building known for its policy of racial discrimination against African Americans as a center for the study of civil rights.

Now housed in the former Engman Public Natatorium – South Bend, Indiana's first swimming pool that excluded and then segregated against African Americans for almost thirty years – the CRHC is dedicated to the preservation of the legacy of the Civil Rights Movement, as well as the history of race and ethnic relations in the South Bend area, and seeks to provide education, research, and forums, while examining human rights principles and challenges for future generations.

Located within the West Washington National Historic Register District, the Engman Natatorium opened in 1922 as a public swimming pool that limited use to whites and was not fully integrated until 1950. The Natatorium closed in 1978, and sat for decades in a state of disrepair. Thanks to the efforts of students and faculty from Indiana University South Bend, the City of South Bend, the South Bend Heritage Foundation, and the Indiana University Foundation, the building underwent extensive renovations and now functions as the home of the Civil Rights Heritage Center.

== History ==
The Indiana University South Bend Civil Rights Heritage Center was established on the campus of Indiana University South Bend in 2000. It was inspired by IU South Bend students who participated in a course called Freedom Summer.

On May 14, 2000, sixteen IU South Bend students, faculty, and staff from the South Bend Tribune boarded a tour bus for 15 days of studying the Civil Rights Movement in the South. Their goal was to experience history as a living presence. These students walked where civil rights participants walked, ate where they ate, and talked with more than twenty veterans of this critical period. These students returned from Freedom Summer 2000 and founded the Civil Rights Heritage Center to record, preserve, and highlight the struggles and achievements of citizens committed to social justice.

Their studies led them to learn more about the former Engman Public Natatorium, South Bend's first municipal swimming pool. At the time, it sat as a vacant and abandoned building. Students led a charge to transform the building into a new home for the center. In May 2010, the Engman Natatorium was dedicated as the IU South Bend Civil Rights Heritage Center with support from generous contributions from local residents and philanthropists and the College of Liberal Arts and Science at IU South Bend. This unique rebirth of the public pool, which was honored in South Bend's designation as an All-America City in 2011 and a 2014 Freedom Award presented at the Annual Dr. Martin Luther King Jr Indiana Statehouse Celebration, now pays tribute to the civil rights contributions of local citizens.
