= South Bend, Indiana =

City in Indiana, United States

South Bend
- City
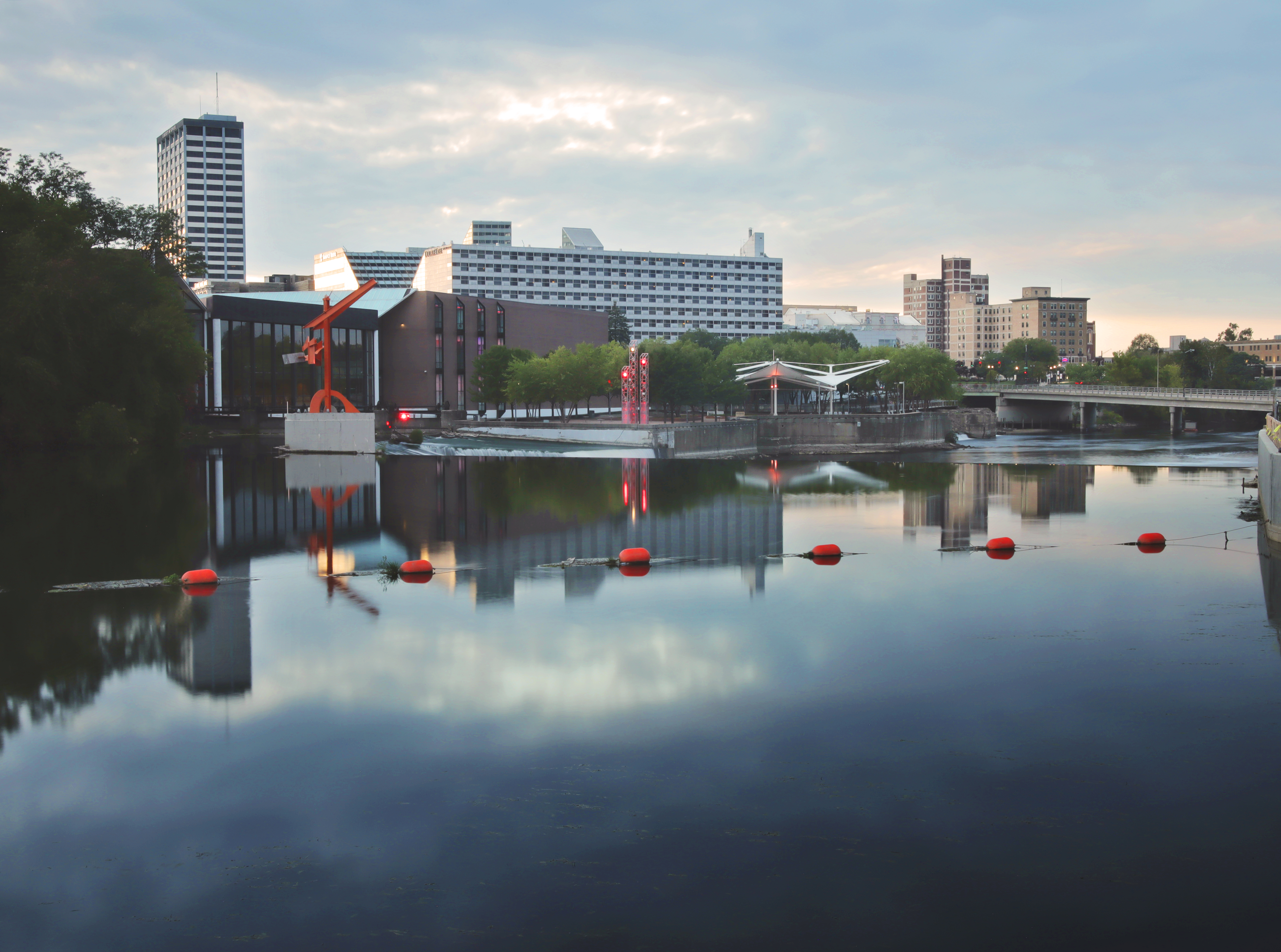
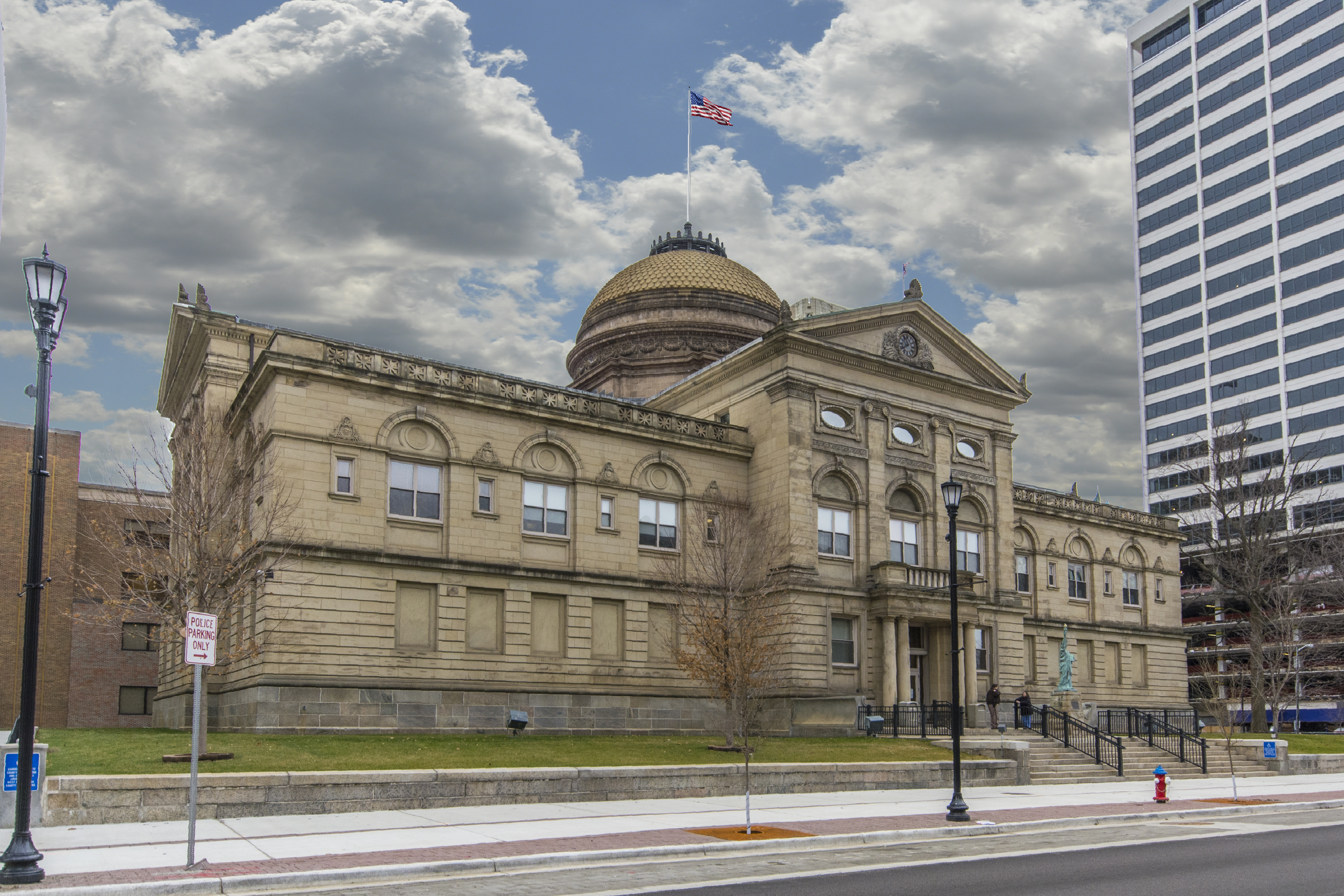
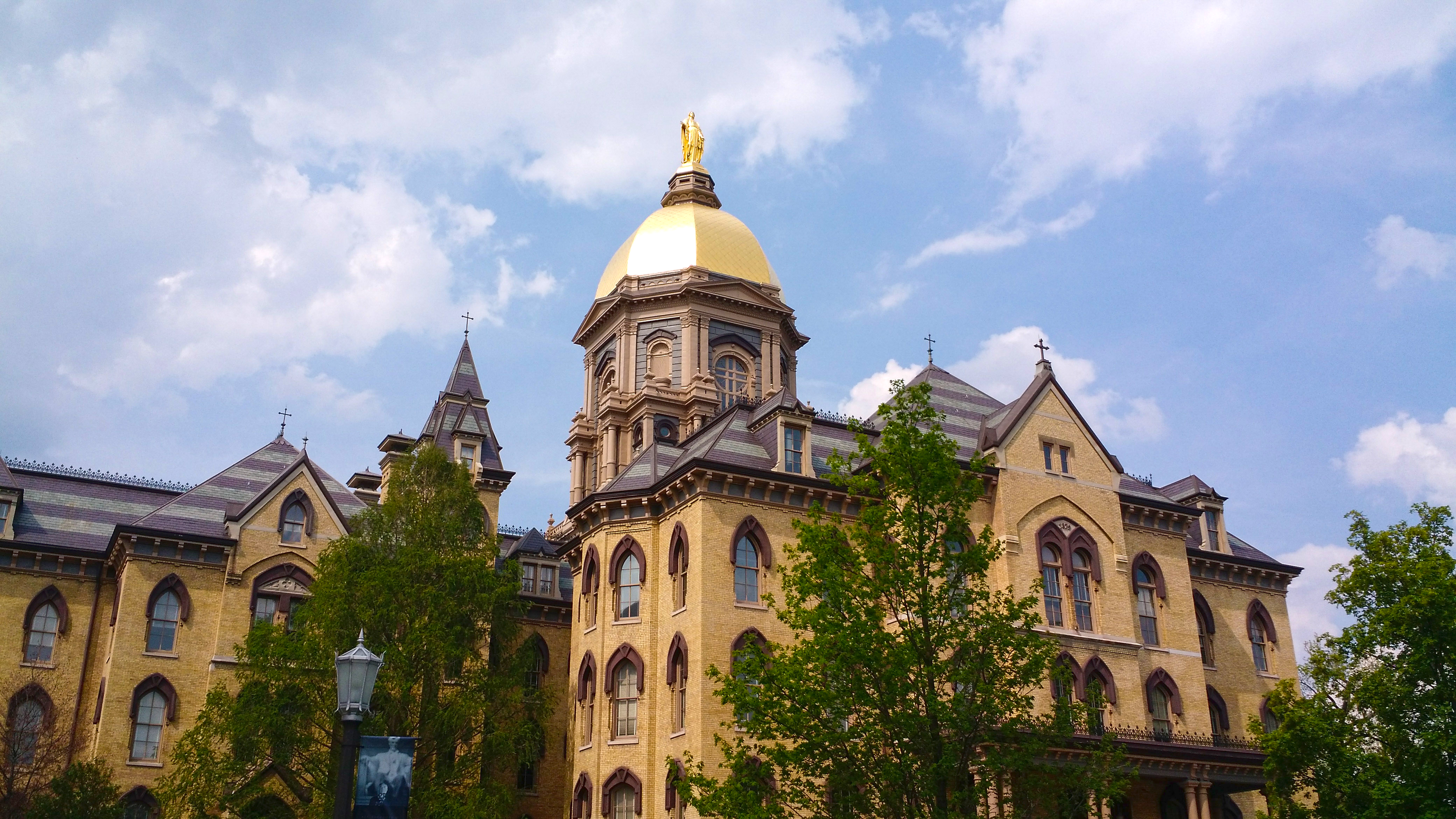
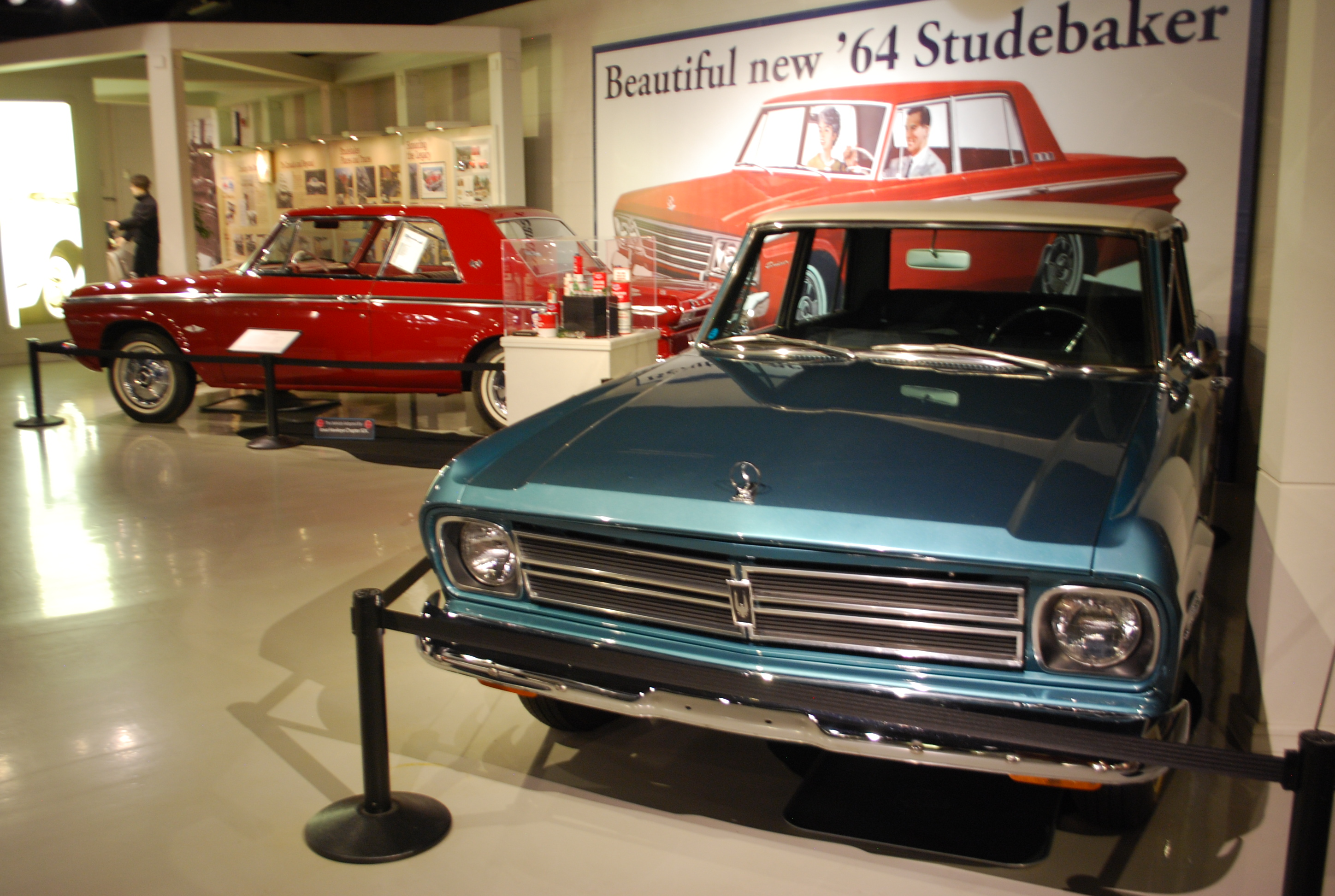
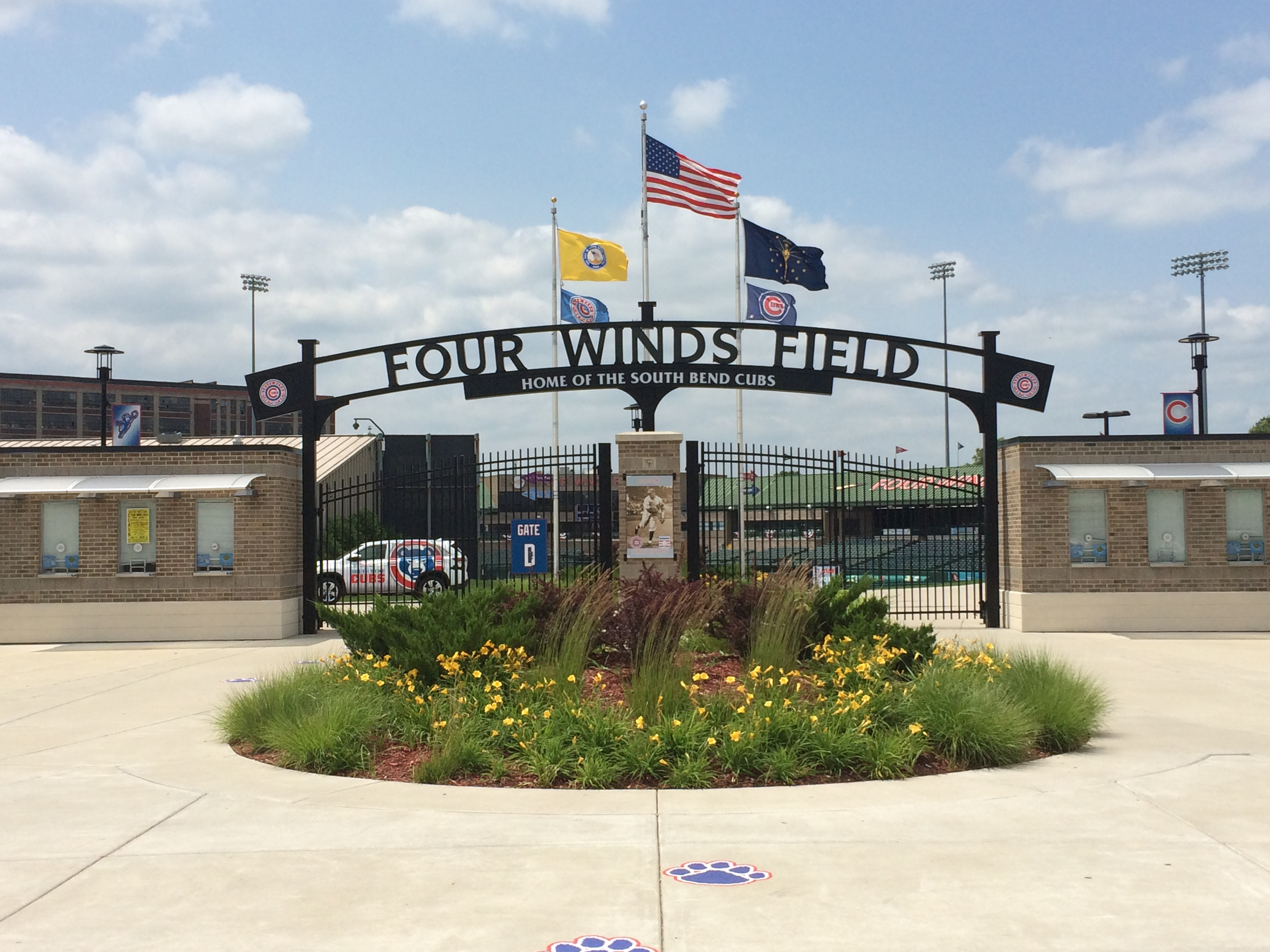
- Downtown South Bend and St. Joseph River St. Joseph County Courthouse University of Notre Dame Studebaker National Museum Four Winds Field

- Flag Seal
- Nicknames: The Bend, Lotion City, Wagon City, Metropolis of Northern Indiana
- Motto: "Peace"
- Interactive map of South Bend
- Location within Indiana Location within the United States
- Coordinates: 41°40′35″N 86°16′10″W
- Country: United States
- State: Indiana
- County: St. Joseph
- Townships: Portage, German, Center, Penn, Clay, Warren
- Incorporated (City): 1865
- Founder: Alexis Coquillard

Government
  - Type: Strong Mayor-Council
  - Body: South Bend Common Council
  - Mayor: James Mueller (D)

Area
  - City: 42.40 sq mi (109.82 km^{2})
  - Land: 41.98 sq mi (108.72 km^{2})
  - Water: 0.42 sq mi (1.10 km^{2})
- Elevation: 719 ft (219 m)

Population (2020)
  - City: ▲103,453
  - Density: 2,464.6/sq mi (951.58/km^{2})
  - Urban: ▲278,921 (US: 144th)
  - Urban density: 1,890/sq mi (728/km^{2})
  - Metro: ▲324,501 (US: 160th)
  - CSA: ▲812,199 (US: 68th)

GDP
  - Metro: $35.608 billion (2022)
- Time zone: UTC−5 (EST)
  - Summer (DST): UTC−4 (EDT)
- ZIP Codes: 46601, 46604, 46612–46617, 46619–46620, 46624, 46626, 46628–46629, 46634–46635, 46637, 46660, 46680, 46699
- Area code: 574
- FIPS code: 18-71000
- GNIS feature ID: 2395913
- Demonyms: South Bender, Domer (Notre Dame)
- GDP: ▲$11.2 billion
- Website: www.southbendin.gov

South Bend is a city in St. Joseph County, Indiana, United States, and its county seat. It lies along the St. Joseph River near its southernmost bend, from which it derives its name. It is the fourth-most populous city in Indiana with a population of 103,453 at the 2020 census. Located directly south of Indiana's northern border with Michigan, South Bend anchors the broader Michiana region. Its metropolitan area had a population of 324,501 in 2020, while its combined statistical area had 812,199 residents.

The area was first settled in the early 19th century by fur traders and was established as a city in 1865. The St. Joseph River shaped South Bend's economy through the mid-20th century. River access assisted heavy industrial development such as that of the Studebaker Corporation and the Oliver Chilled Plow Company.

Like other Rust Belt cities, South Bend has been affected by population and industrial decline since the 1960s. This has been chiefly due to the demise of Studebaker, migration to suburban areas, and the loss of other heavy industry. However, in recent years, there have been successful efforts to invest in and revitalize blighted areas of the city. Today, the largest industries in South Bend are health care, education, small business, and tourism. The city is home to manufacturer AM General and financial services company 1st Source. A major draw for visitors is the nearby University of Notre Dame, which also plays an important role in the local economy and culture.

The city is served by the South Bend International Airport and by the South Shore Line commuter railway, connecting South Bend to downtown Chicago, which is 72 miles (116 km) to the west.

== History ==
=== Early history ===
The St. Joseph Valley was long occupied by Native Americans. One of the earliest known groups to occupy what would later become northern Indiana was the Miami tribe. Later, the Potawatomi moved into the region, utilizing the rich food and natural resources found along the river. The Potawatomi occupied this region of Indiana until most of them were forcibly removed in the 1840s. The South Bend area was popular because its portage was the shortest overland route from the St. Joseph River to the Kankakee River. This route was used for centuries, first by the Native Americans, then by French explorers, missionaries and traders. The French explorer René-Robert Cavelier, Sieur de La Salle, the first white European to set foot in what is now South Bend, used this portage between the St. Joseph River and the Kankakee River in December 1679.

=== First settlements ===
The first permanent white settlers of South Bend were fur traders who established trading posts in the area. In 1820, Pierre Frieschutz Navarre arrived, representing the American Fur Company (AFC) of John Jacob Astor. He settled near what is now downtown South Bend. Alexis Coquillard, another agent of the AFC, established a trading post known as the Big St. Joseph Station. In 1827, Lathrop Minor Taylor established a post for Samuel Hanna and Company, in whose records the name St. Joseph's, Indiana was used. By 1829, the town was growing, with Coquillard and Taylor emerging as leaders. They applied for a post office. Taylor was appointed postmaster, and the post office was designated as Southold, Allen County, Indiana. The following year, the name was changed to South Bend, probably to ease confusion, as several other communities were named Southold at the time.

In 1831, South Bend was laid out as the county seat and as one of the four original townships of St. Joseph County with 128 residents. That same year, Horatio Chapin moved to the settlement, opened the first general store with imported (out of state) goods and helped established the first church and Sunday school. Around the same time, design began on what would become the town of South Bend. The town was formally established in 1835, with Chapin as the first president of the board of town trustees. In 1856, attorney Andrew Anderson, Chapin's son-in-law, founded May Oberfell Lorber, the oldest continuous business in St. Joseph County. He compiled a complete index of South Bend's real estate records.

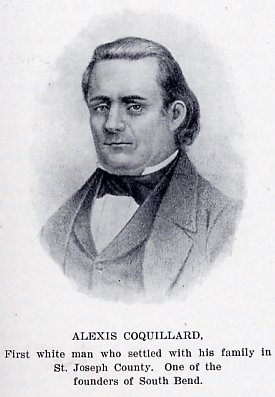
Alexis Coquillard

In 1841, Schuyler Colfax was appointed St. Joseph County deputy auditor. Colfax purchased the South Bend Free Press and then turned it into a pro-Whig newspaper, the St. Joseph Valley Register. He was a member of the state constitutional convention of 1850, at which he opposed the barring of African American migration to Indiana. He joined the Republican Party, like many Whigs of his day, and was elected to Congress in 1855, becoming Speaker of the House in 1863 during the administration of Abraham Lincoln. In 1868, he was elected vice president under Ulysses S. Grant. Colfax returned to South Bend after his stint in Washington and is buried in City Cemetery, west of downtown.

=== Early business ===
During the late 1830s through the 1850s, much of South Bend's development centered on the industrial complex of factories located on the two races (man-made canals along the St. Joseph River in South Bend). Several dams were created and factories were built on each side of the river. On October 4, 1851, the first steam locomotive entered South Bend. This shifted commerce from the river to the railroad. In 1852, Henry Studebaker set up Studebaker wagon shop, later becoming the world's largest wagon builder and the only one to later succeed as an automobile manufacturer. The Singer Sewing Company and the Oliver Chilled Plow Company were among other companies that made manufacturing the driving force in the South Bend economy until the mid-20th century. Another important economic act was the dredging of the Kankakee River in 1884 to create farmland. During this time period there was a great immigration of Europeans, such as Polish, Hungarian, Irish, German, Italian, and Swedish people to South Bend because of available employment in area factories.

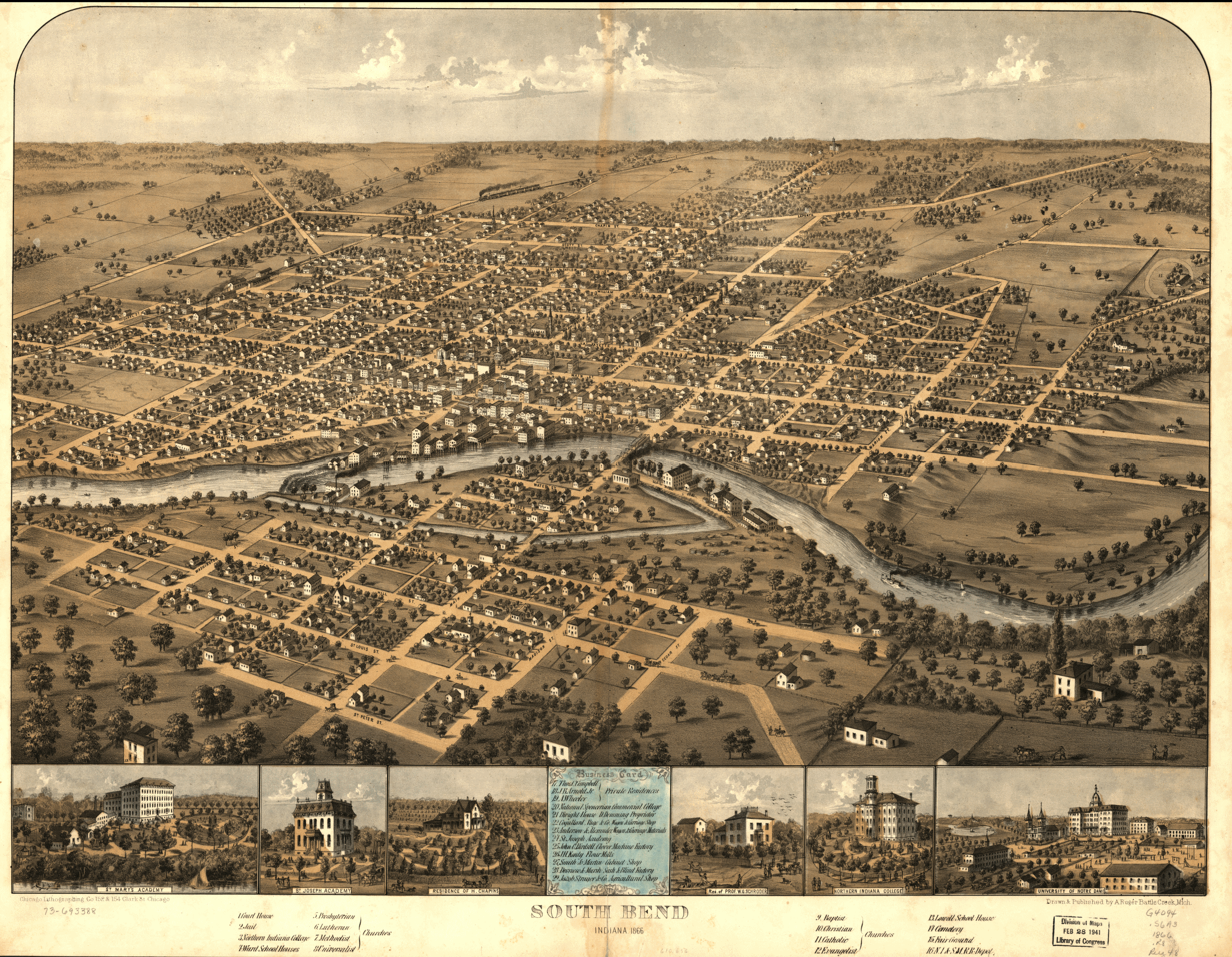
South Bend in 1866

South Bend benefited from its location on the Michigan Road, the main north–south artery of northern Indiana in the 19th century. Another significant development occurred near South Bend in 1842, when Father Edward Sorin founded the University of Notre Dame just north of the town. It became a major factor in the area's economy and culture.

=== Establishment and early history ===
South Bend was incorporated as a city on May 22, 1865, and its first elections were held on June 5, 1865, with William G. George elected as its first mayor The official city motto, "Peace", refers to the fact that incorporation came in the month following the Confederate surrender that effectively ended the American Civil War.

Industrial growth was rapid after the Civil War, most notably with the Studebaker wagon factory, and the Oliver plow company. Good jobs and high wages attracted immigrants from Europe, especially Germans, Irish, and Poles. The majority were Catholic, and they achieved higher rates of social mobility than the same ethnic groups in the Northeast.

Olivet African Methodist Episcopal (AME) Church was founded in South Bend in March 1870, making it the first African American church in the city. Olivet AME is still an active African Methodist Episcopal Church, and celebrated its 145th anniversary in 2015.

A sergeant from South Bend fired the first American shells against Germany in World War I.

==== History with Ku Klux Klan ====
In 1923, the African American owner of a soda fountain received a letter signed "KKK", threatening to kill an African American man held in the city's jail and harm the rest of the city's African American population. Within a few days, over a thousand African Americans fled the city.

In 1924, the Ku Klux Klan held a conference and planned a parade from its local headquarters at 230 S. Michigan St. In preparation, Klan members were posted around town to direct traffic. Students from the nearby University of Notre Dame, aware of the anti-Catholic nature of the Klan, vigorously protested this intrusion, and before noon all of the Klansmen traffic directors had been "unmasked and unrobed." Notre Dame students continued the fight, with several hundred gathering outside of the Klan headquarters, throwing rocks and smashing windows in protest. Local police as well as Notre Dame officials eventually managed to convince them to return to campus. Notre Dame football coach and athletic director Knute Rockne became involved in the struggle to calm down the students.

=== Later business ===
Other companies in the manufacturing industry developed in South Bend in the early 20th century, including Birdsell Manufacturing Company, the Bendix Corporation, Honeywell, AlliedSignal, South Bend Lathe Works, the O'Brien Paint Corp., the South Bend Toy Company, South Bend Range, South Bend Bait Company, and South Bend Watch Company. Workers at the Bendix Corporation staged the first sit-in strike in American history in 1936. Fast development led to the creation of electric rail transportation throughout the area, and in 1925, the South Shore interurban service was established from downtown South Bend to downtown Chicago. The South Shore Line still runs daily to and from Chicago and also is a major freight carrier in the area.

On June 30, 1934, the Merchants National Bank in South Bend was the last bank to be robbed by the Dillinger gang.

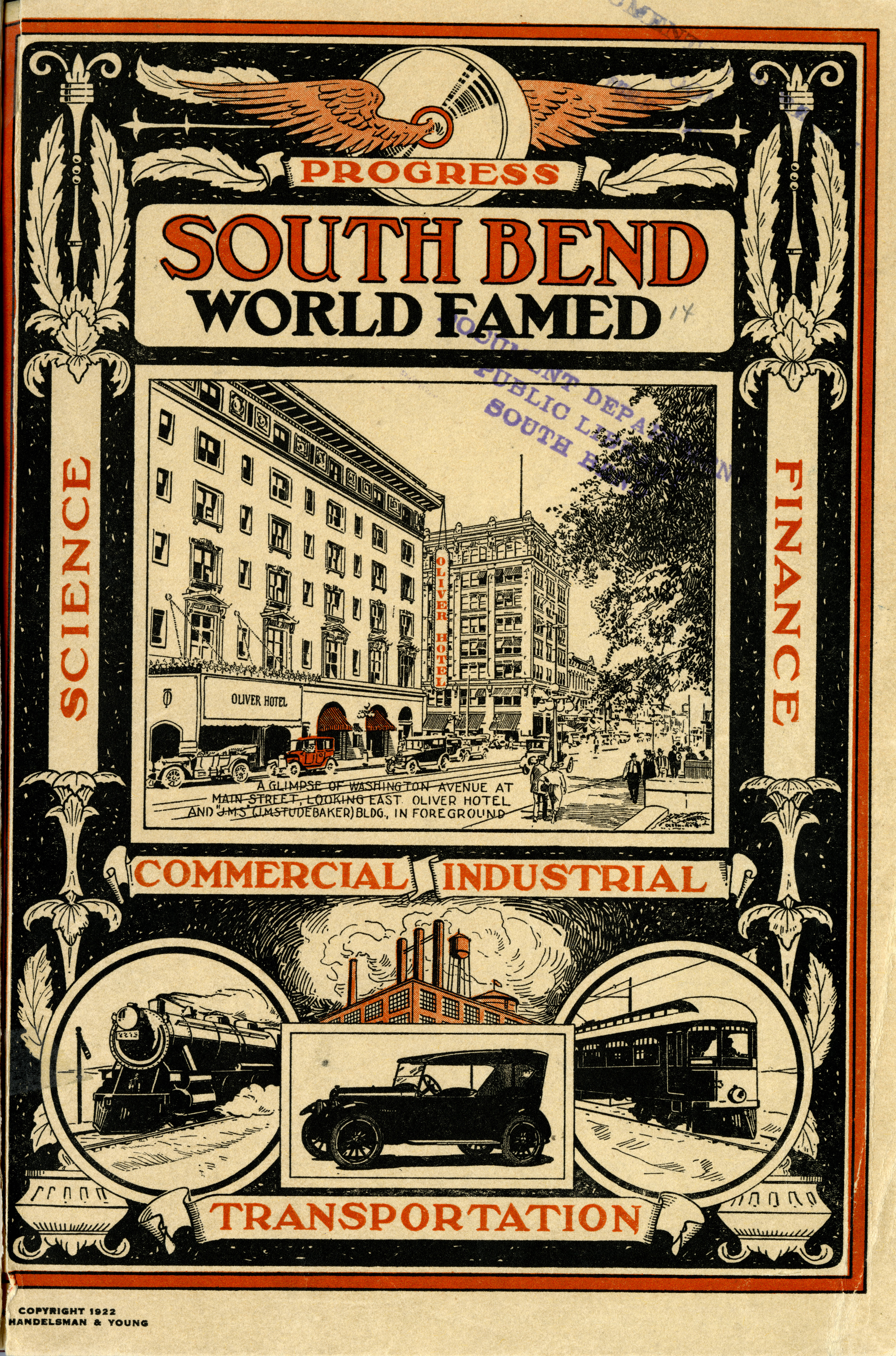
This 1922 pamphlet demonstrates the visions of progress and global importance in the peak period of industrialization in South Bend.

=== Recent history ===
On September 29, 1929, South Bend completed its "track elevation program". This was a railroad infrastructure project which saw the removal of Grand Trunk Western Railroad tracks from Division Street, the removal of level crossings from Chapin to Miami streets, the creation of a modern freight layout, and the construction of Union Station. This project had been seventeen years in the making, and had been the subject of the Indiana Supreme Court case Vandalia Railroad v. South Bend, which was subsequently affirmed by the Supreme Court of the United States.

In 1949, percussionist Lionel Hampton was informed that his concert at South Bend's Palais du Royale would be a blacks-only event; he threatened to call for a boycott of the venue, and the affair proceeded as an integrated evening, which newspapers said led to all attendees breaking out in "paroxysms of ecstasy".

By 1950, more than half of all employment was in the manufacturing sector. Due to economic difficulties, Studebaker closed its automotive manufacturing plants in South Bend in December 1963. A general decline in manufacturing soon followed as industry was restructured nationwide. By 2000, only 16% of the local economy consisted of manufacturing. Due to the severe loss of jobs, the city's population decreased by nearly 30,000 during that period. This decline of industry and population loss led to the area being designated as part of the midwestern Rust Belt due to the effects of deindustrialization.

In 1984, South Bend community leaders began seeking a minor-league baseball team for the city. A stadium was constructed in 1986 and a 10-year player-development contract was signed with the Chicago White Sox. The team would be known as the South Bend White Sox. In 1994, the team's name was changed to the South Bend Silver Hawks, and then to the South Bend Cubs in 2015. They are a Class A minor league affiliate of the Chicago Cubs in the Midwest League.

In 2015, the City of South Bend celebrated its 150th birthday. The yearlong festival culminated with the ceremonial illumination of the first River Lights along the St. Joseph River, and included appearances by Mayor Pete Buttigieg along with five previous South Bend mayors: Steve Luecke, Joe Kernan, Roger Parent, Peter Nemeth, and Jerry Miller.

In 2015, the city's population increased by 286, the largest one-year growth in over twenty years. The former Studebaker plant has been developed as the Ignition Park center to attract new businesses, especially in the tech industry. South Bend has also seen new development, particularly in the tech field, a decline in unemployment, and a renewal of the downtown area under Buttigieg's tenure, which has been described as a revival and South Bend as a 'turnaround city'. South Bend also was in the national spotlight during former mayor Buttigieg's 2019-20 presidential campaign.

== Geography ==
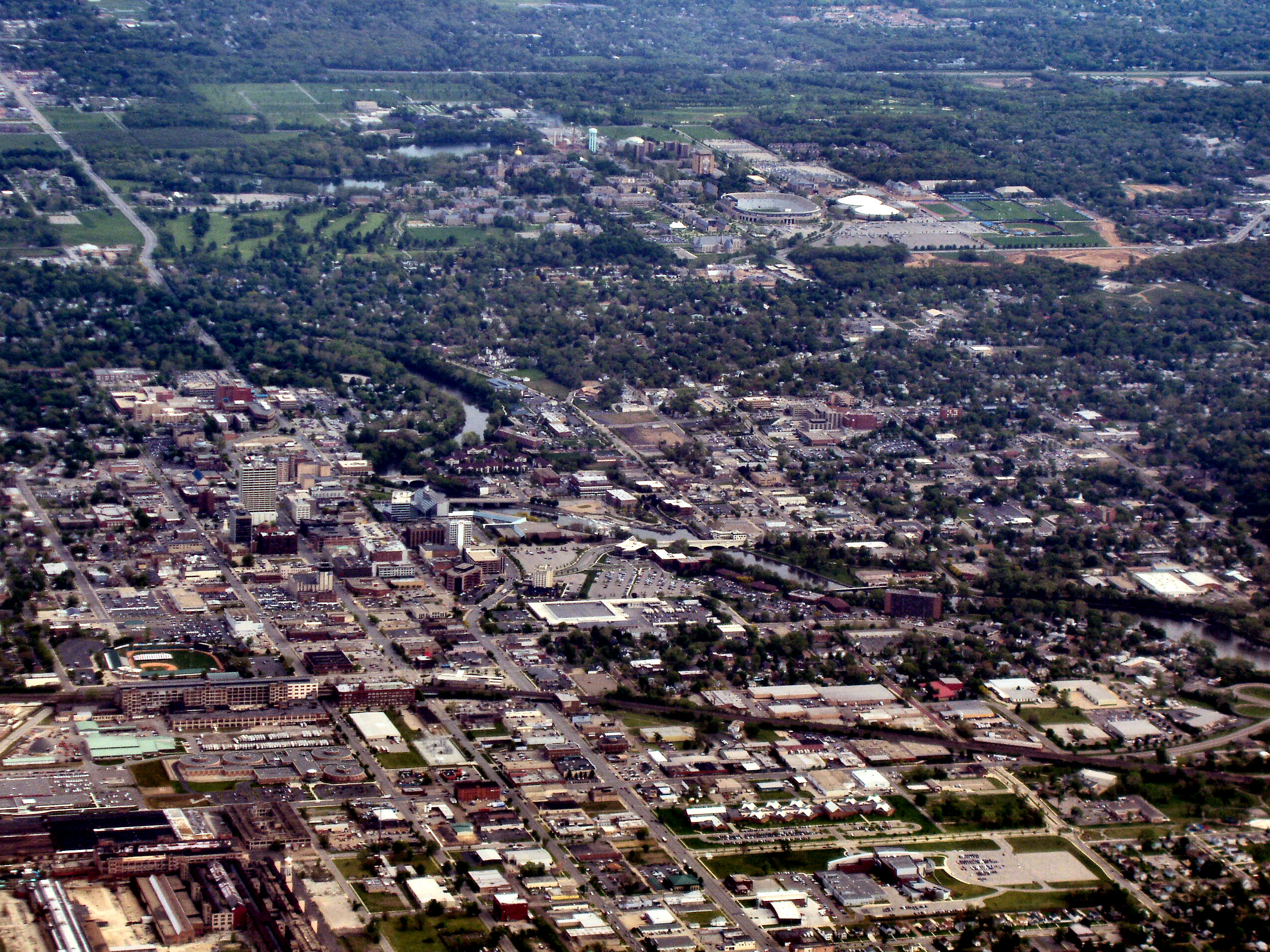
An aerial photo of Downtown South Bend, with the Notre Dame campus and the Indiana Toll Road in the background

South Bend is located 5 mi (8 km) from the Michigan border and approximately equidistant from Illinois and Ohio. The city is 93 mi (150 km) from Chicago. The shore of Lake Michigan is 20 mi (32 km) away.

According to the 2010 census, South Bend has a total area of 41.877 square miles (108.46 km^{2}), of which 41.46 square miles (107.38 km^{2}), or 99%, is land and 0.417 square miles (1.08 km^{2}), or 1%, is water.

=== Cityscape ===
The St. Joseph River flows from the east end of the city turning north near the city center, giving South Bend its name at the bend in the river. South Bend is located on the north–south continental divide, and the river flows northwest into Lake Michigan. The downtown area is located in the north-central part of the city along the St. Joseph River. Notre Dame, Indiana, is directly adjacent to the north. The city extends further north on the west side, mainly with manufacturing and distribution facilities near the South Bend International Airport. Mishawaka, Indiana, is adjacent to South Bend's east side.

=== Neighborhoods ===
Notable neighborhoods in the city include:

- Far Northwest, Near Northwest, and Keller Park are located off of Portage Avenue along the riverfront.
- Northeast South Bend is between the River and SR 23 north of East LaSalle Avenue.
- River Park is located north and south of Mishawaka Avenue. It has been the subject of several redevelopment projects intended to revitalize the area.
- The Wayne Street neighborhood between Washington Street and Sunnymede Avenue along Jefferson Boulevard was designated a historic district in 1987.
- Rum Village is in Southwest South Bend north of West Ewing Avenue and west of South Main Street.
- The Eddy Street Commons is a mixed-use complex along North Eddy Street across Angela Boulevard from Notre Dame.
- Leeper Park is south of the River and northwest of the Memorial Hospital main campus.
- The North Shore Triangle is located in between Angela Boulevard and North Shore Drive, just across the river from Leeper Park

=== Climate ===
South Bend has a humid continental climate, with a Köppen climate classification of Dfa. Lake Michigan exerts a great influence on the climate of South Bend, including lake-effect snow in winter and a tendency to moderate temperatures year round. June, July and August are the warmest months, with average temperatures above 69 °F (21 °C). Normally, 42 days with thunderstorms occur each year. The snowiest month is usually January, with snowfall normally recorded from October through April. On average, South Bend receives 64.5 inches (164 cm) of snow per year. Spring and fall can be mild and overcast, but also severely stormy at times with 293 partly cloudy to cloudy days each year.

Climate data for South Bend, Indiana (South Bend Regional Airport), 1981–2010 normals, extremes 1893–present
Month	Jan	Feb	Mar	Apr	May	Jun	Jul	Aug	Sep	Oct	Nov	Dec	Year
Record high °F (°C)	68 (20)	74 (23)	85 (29)	91 (33)	97 (36)	106 (41)	109 (43)	105 (41)	99 (37)	92 (33)	82 (28)	70 (21)	109 (43)
Mean maximum °F (°C)	53.9 (12.2)	56.5 (13.6)	70.9 (21.6)	80.2 (26.8)	87.3 (30.7)	92.8 (33.8)	93.5 (34.2)	91.7 (33.2)	89.3 (31.8)	81.6 (27.6)	67.2 (19.6)	56.3 (13.5)	95.3 (35.2)
Mean daily maximum °F (°C)	31.2 (−0.4)	34.9 (1.6)	46.2 (7.9)	59.0 (15.0)	70.1 (21.2)	79.4 (26.3)	82.7 (28.2)	80.8 (27.1)	74.4 (23.6)	61.8 (16.6)	47.7 (8.7)	36.3 (2.4)	58.7 (14.8)
Daily mean °F (°C)	24.1 (−4.4)	27.1 (−2.7)	36.7 (2.6)	48.1 (8.9)	59.1 (15.1)	68.8 (20.4)	72.4 (22.4)	70.7 (21.5)	63.7 (17.6)	52.0 (11.1)	39.8 (4.3)	29.6 (−1.3)	49.3 (9.6)
Mean daily minimum °F (°C)	17.0 (−8.3)	19.3 (−7.1)	27.2 (−2.7)	37.1 (2.8)	48.1 (8.9)	58.1 (14.5)	62.1 (16.7)	60.5 (15.8)	53.0 (11.7)	42.1 (5.6)	31.8 (−0.1)	23.0 (−5.0)	39.9 (4.4)
Mean minimum °F (°C)	−4.5 (−20.3)	1.6 (−16.9)	9.9 (−12.3)	22.6 (−5.2)	33.7 (0.9)	44.1 (6.7)	51.1 (10.6)	50.5 (10.3)	39.2 (4.0)	29.4 (−1.4)	18.4 (−7.6)	4.4 (−15.3)	−7.7 (−22.1)
Record low °F (°C)	−22 (−30)	−20 (−29)	−13 (−25)	11 (−12)	24 (−4)	35 (2)	42 (6)	40 (4)	29 (−2)	12 (−11)	−7 (−22)	−18 (−28)	−22 (−30)
Average precipitation inches (mm)	2.66 (68)	2.31 (59)	2.35 (60)	3.49 (89)	4.20 (107)	4.04 (103)	3.78 (96)	4.01 (102)	3.49 (89)	3.72 (94)	2.78 (71)	2.40 (61)	39.23 (996)
Average snowfall inches (cm)	21.6 (55)	16.1 (41)	6.8 (17)	1.0 (2.5)	0.0 (0.0)	0.0 (0.0)	0.0 (0.0)	0.0 (0.0)	0.0 (0.0)	0.2 (0.51)	5.1 (13)	13.7 (35)	64.5 (164)
Average precipitation days (≥ 0.01 in)	16.8	12.5	12.4	13.4	13.4	11.0	9.5	10.0	9.6	11.5	12.6	14.8	147.5
Average snowy days (≥ 0.1 in)	13.1	9.7	5.1	1.5	0.0	0.0	0.0	0.0	0.1	0.3	3.4	9.0	42.2
Source: NOAA

== Demographics ==
Historical population
Census	Pop.	Note	%±
1850	1,652		—
1860	3,832		132.0%
1870	7,206		88.0%
1880	13,280		84.3%
1890	21,819		64.3%
1900	35,999		65.0%
1910	53,684		49.1%
1920	70,983		32.2%
1930	104,193		46.8%
1940	101,268		−2.8%
1950	115,911		14.5%
1960	132,445		14.3%
1970	125,850		−5.0%
1980	109,727		−12.8%
1990	105,511		−3.8%
2000	107,789		2.2%
2010	101,168		−6.1%
2020	103,453		2.3%
2025 (est.)	103,201		−0.2%
U.S. Decennial Census; 2010-2020

=== 2020 census ===
South Bend city, Indiana – Racial and ethnic composition Note: the U.S. census treats Hispanic/Latino as an ethnic category. This table excludes Latinos from the racial categories and assigns them to a separate category. Hispanics/Latinos may be of any race.
Race / Ethnicity (NH = Non-Hispanic)	Pop 2000	Pop 2010	Pop 2020	% 2000	% 2010	% 2020
White alone (NH)	68,202	56,474	51,891	63.27%	55.82%	50.16%
Black or African American alone (NH)	26,259	26,496	26,102	24.36%	26.19%	25.23%
Native American or Alaska Native alone (NH)	338	310	300	0.31%	0.31%	0.29%
Asian alone (NH)	1,271	1,295	1,549	1.18%	1.28%	1.50%
Native Hawaiian or Pacific Islander alone (NH)	49	55	57	0.05%	0.05%	0.06%
Other race alone (NH)	188	233	651	0.17%	0.23%	0.63%
Mixed race or Multiracial (NH)	2,372	3,189	5,654	2.20%	3.15%	5.47%
Hispanic or Latino (any race)	9,110	13,116	17,249	8.45%	12.96%	16.67%
Total	107,789	101,168	103,453	100.00%	100.00%	100.00%

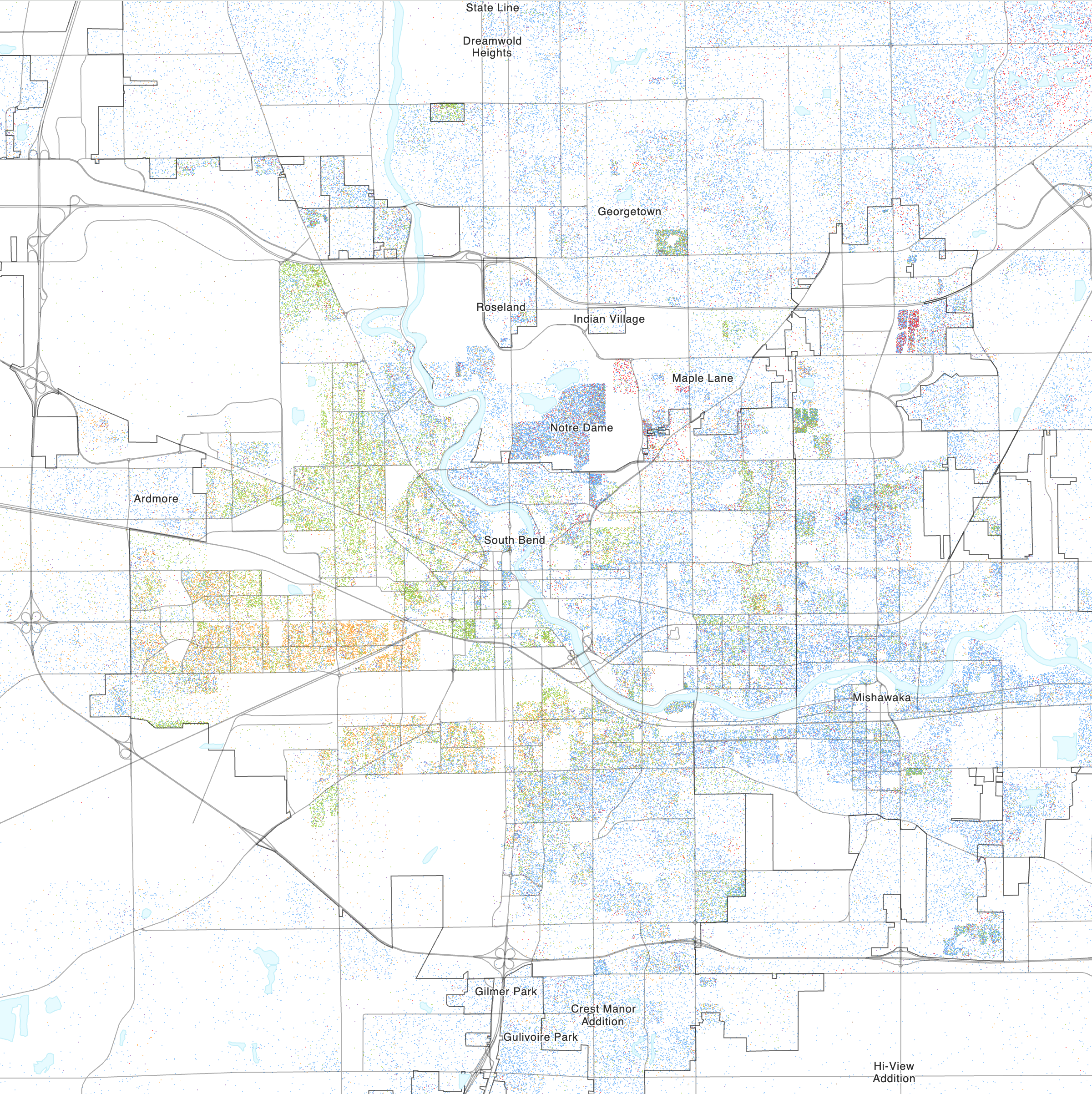
Map of racial distribution in South Bend, 2020 U.S. census. Each dot is one person: ⬤ White ⬤ Black ⬤ Asian ⬤ Hispanic ⬤ Multiracial ⬤ Native American/Other

=== 2010 census ===
As of the census of 2010, there were 101,168 people, 39,760 households, and 23,526 families residing in the city. The population density was 2,440.1 inhabitants per square mile (942.1/km^{2}). There were 46,324 housing units at an average density of 1,117.3 per square mile (431.4/km^{2}). The racial makeup of the city was 60.5% White, 26.6% African American, 0.5% Native American, 1.3% Asian, 0.1% Pacific Islander, 6.9% from other races, and 4.2% from two or more races. Hispanic or Latino residents of any race were 13.0% of the population.

There were 39,760 households, of which 33.1% had children under the age of 18 living with them, 34.9% were married couples living together, 18.9% had a female householder with no husband present, 5.4% had a male householder with no wife present, and 40.8% were non-families. 33.3% Of all households were made up of individuals, and 11.4% had someone living alone who was 65 years of age or older. The average household size was 2.48 and the average family size was 3.19.

The median age in the city was 33.3 years. 27.3% of residents were under the age of 18; 10% were between the ages of 18 and 24; 27.1% were from 25 to 44; 23.1% were from 45 to 64; and 12.5% were 65 years of age or older. The gender makeup of the city was 48.4% male and 51.6% female.

=== Ethnicity ===
Per the 2013 American Community Survey of the U.S. Census Bureau, the following ancestries were reported: African-American - 26%, German - 14.8%, Irish - 10.4%, Polish - 8.2%, English - 5.0%, American - 3.3%, Italian - 2.6%, Hungarian - 2.4%, French - 2.0%, Dutch - 1.4%, Swedish - 1.1%, Belgian - 0.9%.

== Economy ==
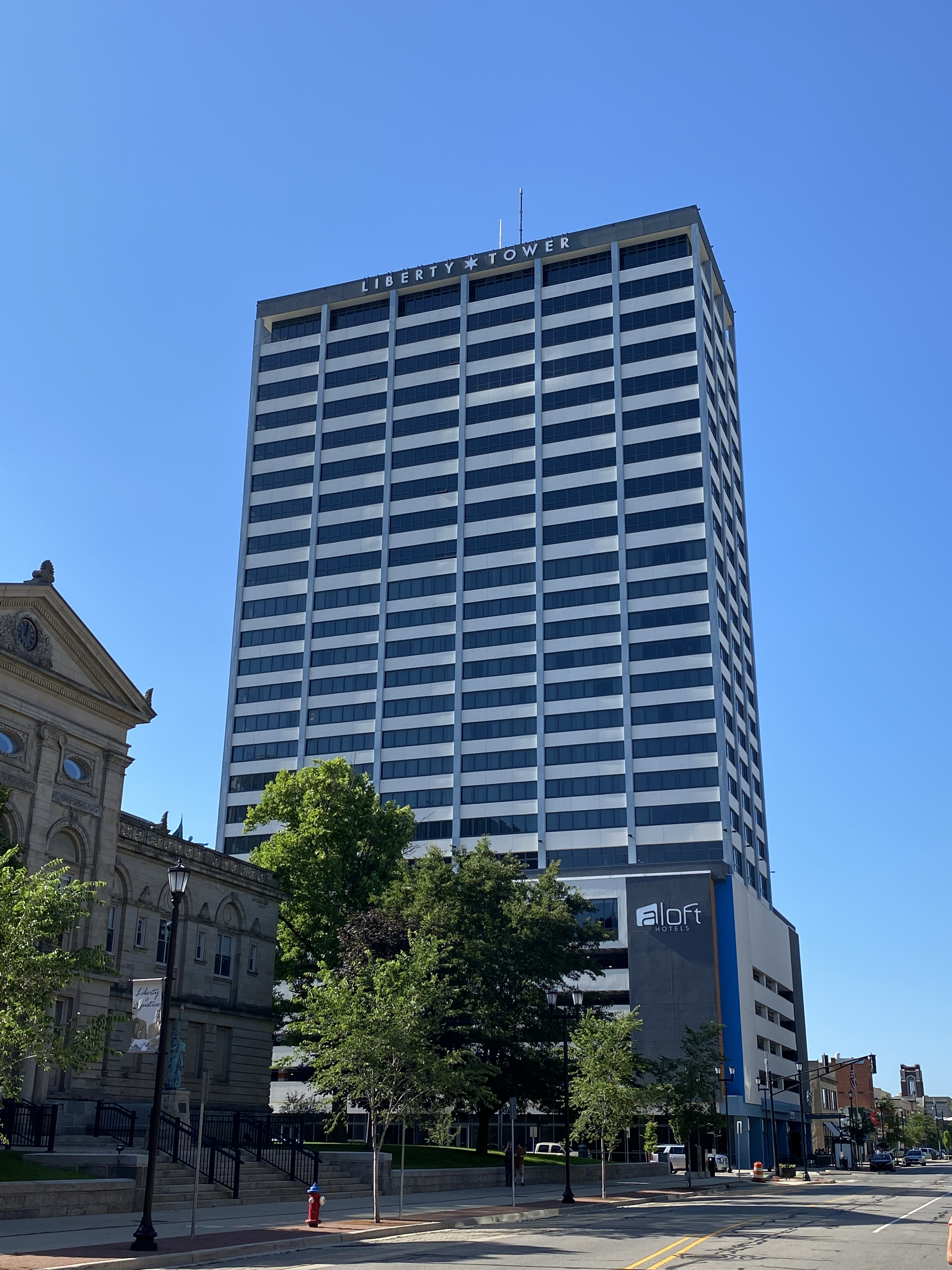
25-story Liberty Tower, the tallest building in South Bend

South Bend's location on the St. Joseph River led to an industrial-based economy in the late 19th century and early-to-mid-20th century. In 1923, industrialist and entrepreneur Vincent H. Bendix selected South Bend as the site of his new manufacturing plant for automotive parts. He chose South Bend primarily because it was on a rail line midway between Chicago and Detroit, the two automotive manufacturing centers of the United States at the time. Eventually, the Bendix corporation built a vast manufacturing complex on its South Bend acreage served by the major railroads, including a huge shipping and receiving building where railroad cars could enter at one end, unload, and depart at the opposite end.

By the end of World War II, manufacturing began to diminish. The Studebaker plant, which had at one time employed 45,000 persons, closed in 1963; its engine block plant shuttered the following year. Parts of the Bendix factory complex were later acquired and divided between Honeywell Corporation and Bosch Corporation, respectively. Honeywell Aerospace continues to manufacture aviation products at its former Bendix facility. In 2010, Bosch announced that it would cease all operations at its Bendix plant location in South Bend by the end of 2011. Bosch vacated the building entirely in October 2012. Curtis Products of South Bend moved into the building in May 2013.

=== Employers ===
Since the 1960s, education, health care, and small business have come to the forefront of South Bend's economy, though the city has never regained the level of prosperity it enjoyed before that time. Nearby University of Notre Dame is a large contributor to the local economy. The university is the second-largest employer in the city and in St. Joseph County, employing 6,086 people.

Health care is another major contributor to the South Bend economy. In 2012, Memorial Health System announced that it was merging with Elkhart General Hospital, located in Elkhart County, to form Beacon Health System. Beacon is the largest employer in the city and in St. Joseph County, employing 7,088 people. Other notable businesses include Honeywell, Bosch, and PEI Genesis. AM General, Crowe Horwath, and Tire Rack all have corporate headquarters in South Bend.

According to the 2017 Comprehensive Annual Financial Report, the city's top employers are:

#	Employer	# of Employees
1	Beacon Health System (Memorial)	7,088
2	University of Notre Dame	6,086
3	South Bend Community School Corporation	3,432
4	Indiana University South Bend	1,401
5	St. Joseph County	1,377
6	City of South Bend	1,285
7	Four Winds Casino	1,200
8	AM General	1,200
9	The South Bend Clinic	854
10	Press Ganey	850

=== Technology ===
Efforts are under way to spur economic growth in South Bend. The St. Joe Valley Metronet is a 50-mile (80 km) dark fiber optic network that encircles South Bend and Mishawaka that allows for strong telecommunications connectivity. The South Bend Metronet, named Zing, is bringing more high-tech firms to the city and surrounding area. This telecommunications network has allowed for the advent of various data centers in South Bend, which serves as a hub between Chicago, Indianapolis, Detroit, and Cincinnati. In 2015, the City of South Bend announced it would provide free wireless internet access via the Metronet in the city's downtown and East Bank areas.

The Union Station Technology Center was purchased from the city in 1979 and is currently Northern Indiana's largest data center. There are currently plans to extend the data center into a fully operating high-tech data hub in the old Studebaker "Ivy Tower" assembly plant next door, creating what will be called the Renaissance District.

==== Innovation Park and Ignition Park ====
Innovation Park and Ignition Park, dual-certified technology parks, have attracted technology businesses to South Bend. Located across the street from the University of Notre Dame, Innovation Park was completed in 2009 and houses innovative researchers from companies and the university. Ignition Park, located just south of the downtown area, is planned to become home to 3 million square feet (280,000 m^{2}) of high-tech space on 140 acres (570,000 m^{2}) of land previously owned by the Studebaker Corporation. The first tenant, Data Realty, moved into the location in the fall of 2012. The second building in the new park, a research and testing facility for massive turbo machinery, is part of a partnership between the city, General Electric, Great Lakes Capital, Indiana Michigan Power, University of Notre Dame, and the state of Indiana.

=== Redevelopment ===
Redevelopment is underway for some of the abandoned industrial facilities, with the abandoned Oliver Corporation buildings being the most recent example of reclaimed property. The city also faced programs with large swaths of vacant housing after the decline of the manufacturing industry. In 2013, 1,347 homes were vacant or abandoned. The city created the Vacant and Abandoned Properties Initiative in February 2013, which aimed to take care of 1,000 vacant or abandoned homes in 1,000 days, either through demolition, repairs, or some other satisfactory means.

The Smart Street Initiative, a 20-year plan to make the city safer for pedestrians, bicyclists, and motorists, began in 2013 with the conversion of one-way streets to two-way streets, to bring more businesses to the area, create shorter travel routes, and to reduce speeding. The other part of the initiative is the West Side Main Streets Plan, a revitalization plan for the Lincoln Way West and Western Avenue corridor focusing on guiding business owners, residents, and developers to improve the street front by offering a reimbursement on exterior improvements from the city and the Urban Enterprise Association.

== Arts and culture ==
=== Culture ===
South Bend was influenced by a large influx of Polish Catholic immigrants in the late 19th century. Dyngus Day is widely celebrated on the Monday after Easter and it is the beginning of the city elections' campaign season. Fat Tuesday is also celebrated in South Bend, with paczkis being a staple food product in the city for the day. The city and surrounding county have 23 Catholic churches, 11 Catholic schools and three Catholic universities (the University of Notre Dame, Holy Cross College, and Saint Mary's College, all located in the adjacent unincorporated area of Notre Dame).

=== Music festivals ===
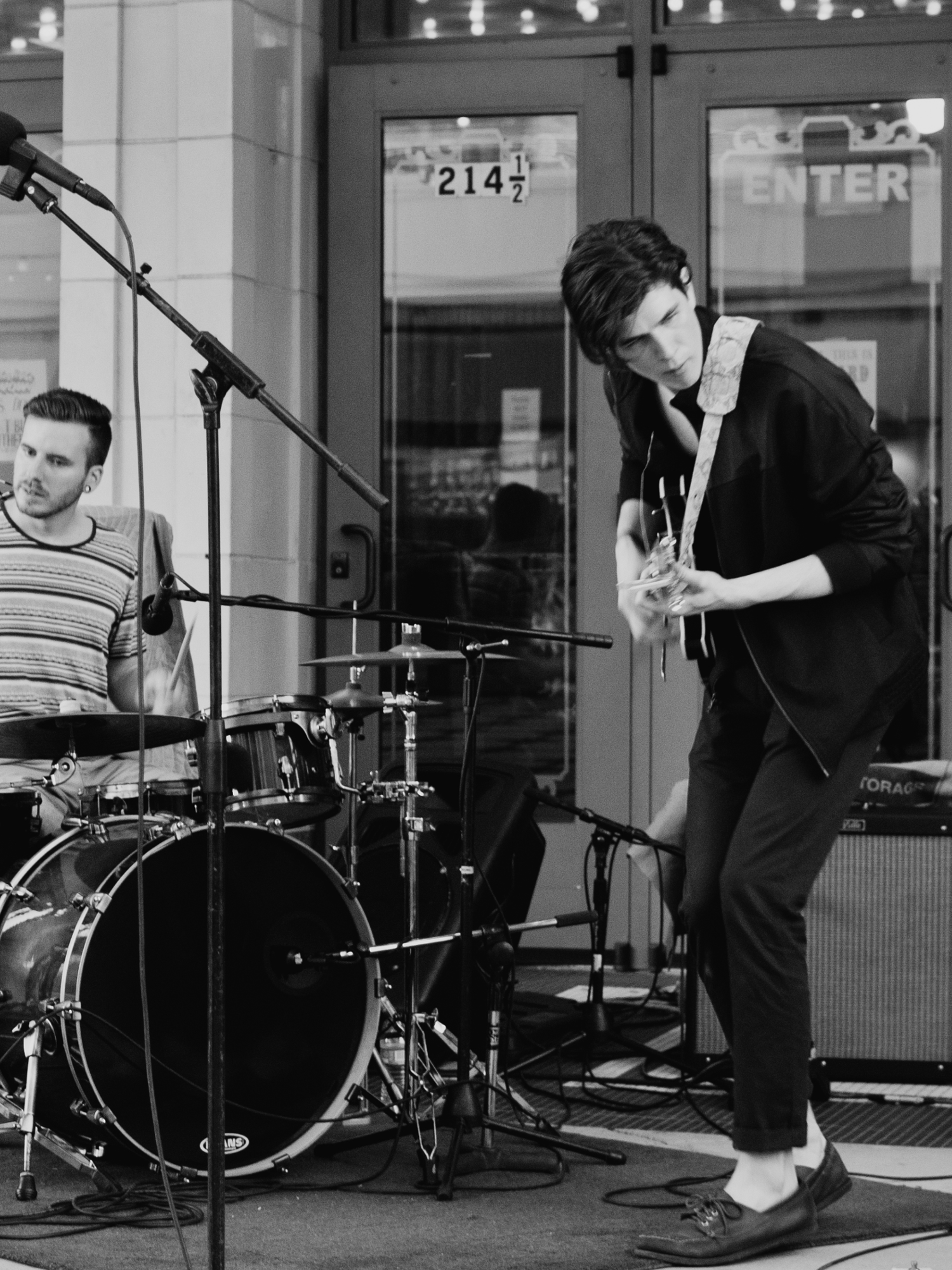
Local band Interstate Traffic performing at South by South Bend

The city hosts several annual festivals. The South Bend International Festival began in 2004 as the South Bend Reggae Festival and now features local and international musical artists who perform in African, Latino, and American cultural styles. Proceeds from the festival are given to the Pangani Foundation of South Bend, which provides medical supplies to hospitals in Malawi. The festival adopted its present name in 2014 on the tenth anniversary.

WBYT FM – B100 (Country Station) hosts an Annual All Day Country Concert, with over 37,000 free tickets in early September.

The World Pulse Festival, broadcast by LeSEA Broadcasting network, is held annually in South Bend. It is hosted by Pulse FM, a local Christian music radio station. The event is an annual Contemporary Christian music festival, attracting more than 50,000 visitors each year.

In 2013, a new annual festival began in South Bend called South by South Bend, named after the famous South By Southwest of Austin, Texas. The festival is a celebration of the local music scene, with local bands and artists performing on the park grounds and other public venues around the city. The goals of the festival include strengthening the bond between the communities of South Bend and Notre Dame, supporting local artistic expression, and promoting local business. In 2015, the festival was renamed Sounds by South Bend, to avoid confusion with the Austin festival and to more accurately represent the purpose of the event. In 2016, the Riverlights Music Festival debuted as successor to Sounds by South Bend.

=== Museums, arts and entertainment ===
The South Bend Museum of Art is located in Century Center in downtown South Bend. The museum was opened to the public in March 1996, and features a variety of artists from South Bend and the Michiana region. Currently, over 850 works are featured in the permanent collection. The museum also offers several classes and workshops for adults and children.

==== The History Museum ====
The History Museum is the public name of the Northern Indiana Historical Society, the second-oldest historical society in Indiana, established in 1867 to collect and interpret the history of the northern Indiana region by St. Joseph County's leading citizens. The Oliver Mansion (also known by its original name, Copshaholm) is one of the central features of the museum. The 38-room mansion was built in 1895 and is currently listed in the National Register of Historic Places. The home was built by Joseph Doty Oliver, son of James Oliver, the founder of the Oliver Farm Equipment Company, once the largest plow manufacturer in the United States. In addition to the Oliver Mansion and the Workers Home (a 1920s Polish-American family home), the museum includes areas dedicated to the history of the St. Joseph River Valley, the University of Notre Dame, the All-American Girls Professional Baseball League, and the Kidsfirst Children's Museum.

==== Studebaker National Museum ====
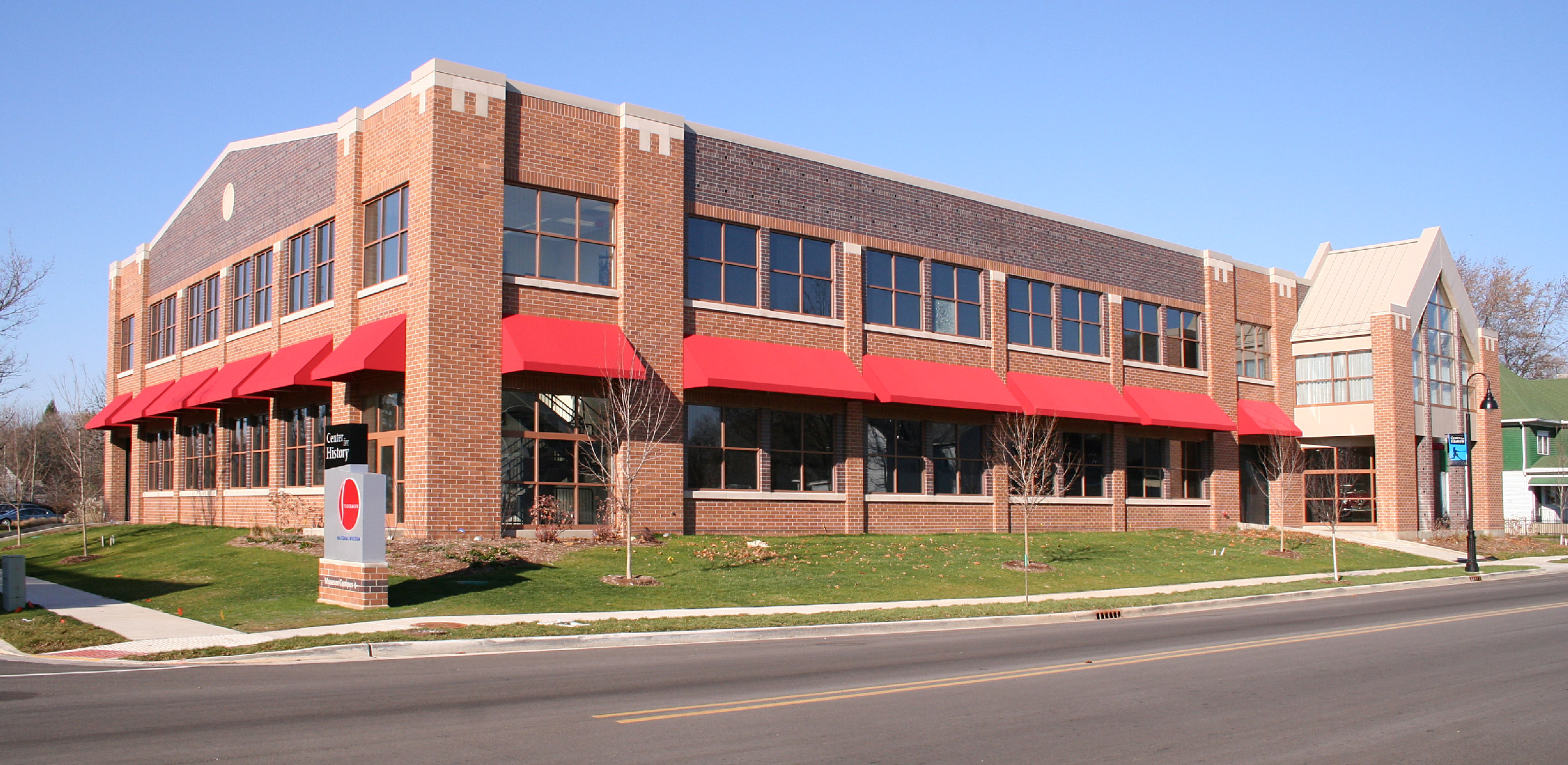
Studebaker National Museum in South Bend

The Studebaker National Museum holds a large collection of wagons and automobiles from the 150-year history of the Studebaker Corporation. The museum began as a collection of wagons and automobiles produced by Studebaker, including the presidential carriages of Lincoln, McKinley, Harrison, and Grant. The company donated the collection to the city of South Bend in 1966. The collection was housed in various locations from Century Center to its current location in downtown South Bend, adjacent to The History Museum. The two museums share one campus, and together form The Museums at Washington and Chapin. The former South Bend mansion of Clement Studebaker, named Tippecanoe Place, is now a restaurant.

==== Indiana University Civil Rights Heritage Center ====
The Indiana University South Bend Civil Rights Heritage Center is housed in the former Engman Public Natatorium. What was once the city's first indoor swimming pool excluded and then segregated against African Americans for its first twenty-eight years. In 2010, Indiana University South Bend re-opened the building, and now offers tours and events focusing on the histories of civil rights and the experiences of African Americans, Latinos, and LGBTQ people in South Bend.

==== Theatrical buildings ====
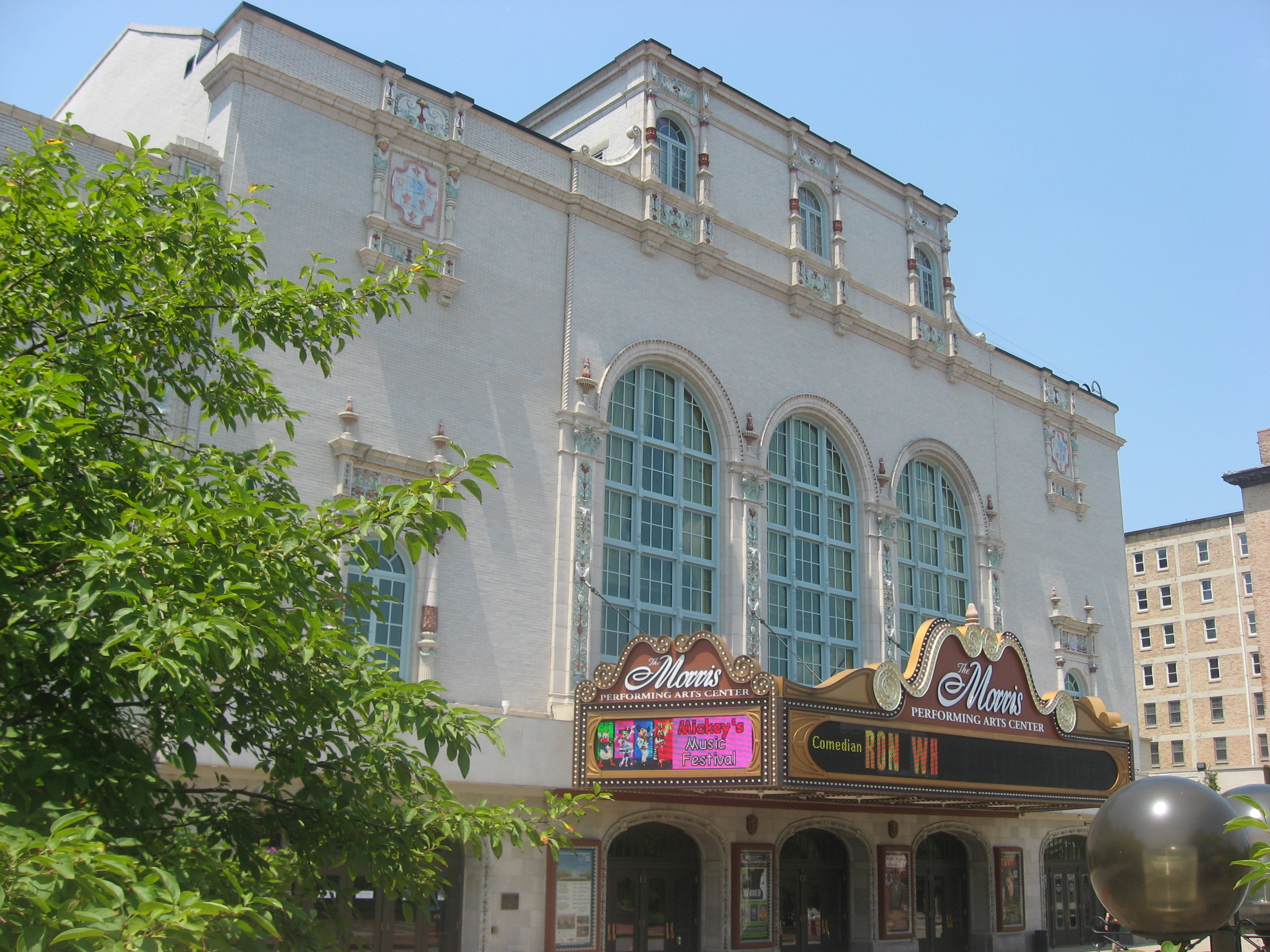
Morris Performing Arts Center in South Bend

The Morris Performing Arts Center, built in 1922, included the Palace Theater, a venue for vaudeville. The theatre's heyday was in 1940 with the premiere of Knute Rockne, All American, starring Ronald Reagan. A crowd estimated at 24,000 gathered outside. The theater was scheduled for demolition in 1959, when E. M. Morris purchased the facility and sold it to the city for one dollar, after which it was renamed the Morris Civic Auditorium. A total renovation as well as expansion of the stage area was completed in 2000. The Morris Performing Arts Center also includes the restored Palais Royale Ballroom. The center houses the Broadway Theater League and the South Bend Symphony Orchestra. The orchestra's Shanghai-born former conductor, Tsung Yeh, was the first conductor ever to hold music directorships of both a western symphony orchestra and a major Chinese orchestra.

South Bend is also home to The South Bend Hot Patooties, a group that performs a shadowcast of The Rocky Horror Picture Show. The group has performed at various South Bend venues including the State Theater, Legends of Notre Dame, The Potawatomi Conservatories, and the historic Birdsell Mansion.

South Bend Civic Theatre, founded in 1957, was for many years located at The Firehouse, 701 Portage Avenue. It was a small intimate black box theater. In 2007, a new theater opened at 403 North Main Street in what was formerly the Scottish Rite Building. This facility includes a 209-seat main stage auditorium and a 90-seat "black box" studio theatre. The theater produces more than a dozen plays per year, including several productions in its Family Series.

==== Other ====
The Raclin Murphy Museum of Art of the University of Notre Dame is an art museum with a collection of more than 30,000 items.

The DeBartolo Performing Arts Center on the University of Notre Dame campus hosts plays, concerts, performing artists, and films open to the public.

The Fischoff National Chamber Music Association, sponsor of the world's largest chamber music competition, was founded in South Bend in 1973. The annual Fischoff National Chamber Music Competition is held on the campus of the University of Notre Dame.

Schuyler Colfax, the 17th Vice President of the United States, is interred in South Bend City Cemetery.

The Indiana Dinosaur Museum opened in 2024, and features archaeological artifacts.

=== Public library ===
South Bend is served by the St. Joseph County Public Library with a Main Library, and branches in Francis, German, and Lasalle townships. There are a total of ten branches of the public library system throughout the county and from which any library card holder can select. The main library reopened in November 2021 after a full remodel that took two years.

=== Places of worship ===
Notable places of worship include:

- Cathedral of St. James
- First Presbyterian Church
- St. Adalbert Catholic Church
- St. Casimir Catholic Church
- St. Matthew Cathedral
- St Patrick's and St Hedwig's Catholic Churches
- Holy Cross Catholic Parish
- Hebrew Orthodox Congregation

==== Former places of worship ====
- B'nai Israel Synagogue, closed in 1990
- First Presbyterian Church, moved to new building

== Sports ==
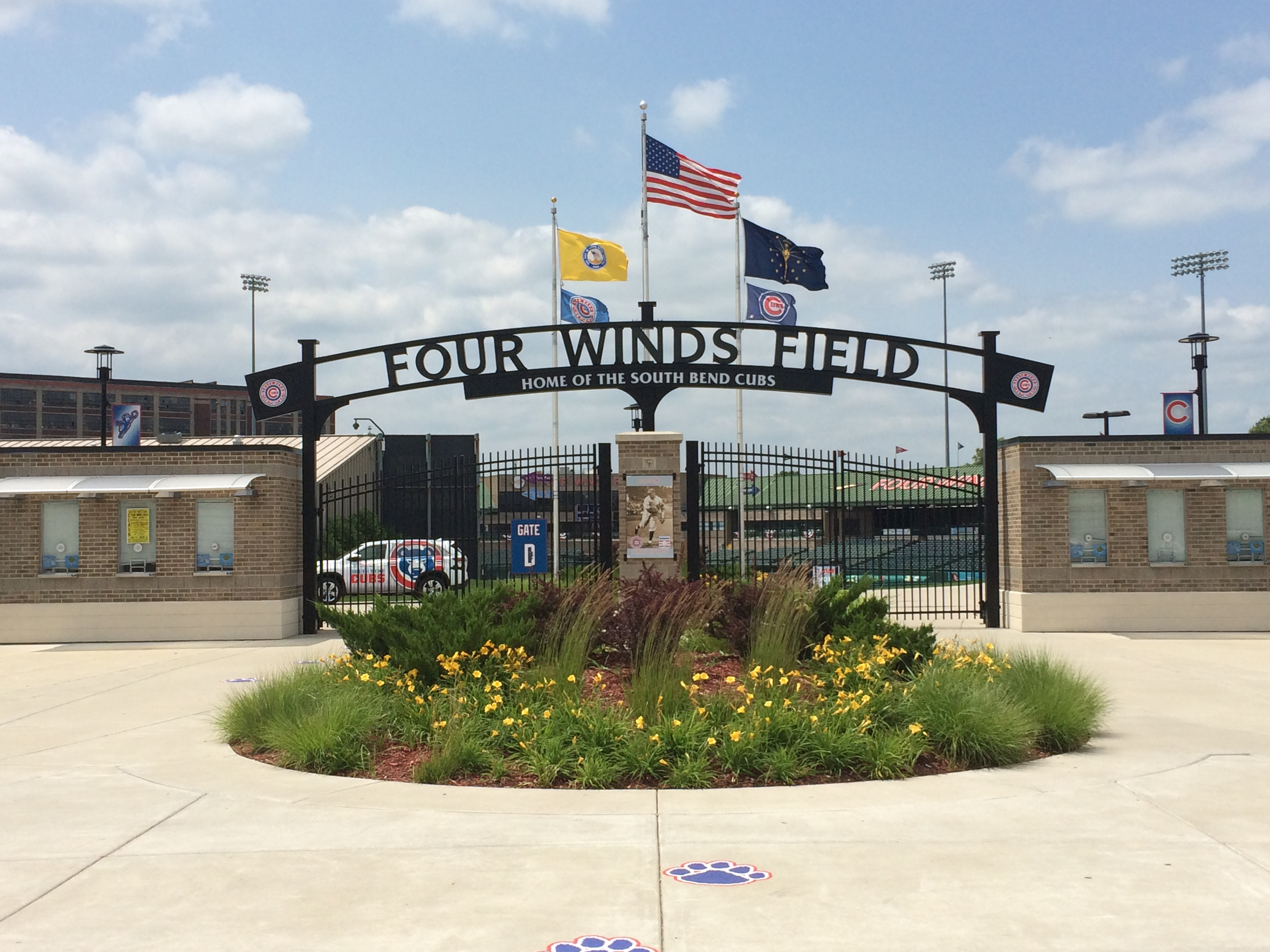
"The Cove" in South Bend

=== South Bend Lions FC ===
A USL2 soccer franchise named in November 2019, located in South Bend. The team plays at TCU School Field with an inaugural season in Summer of 2020. In the summer of 2022 the South Bend Lions earned the title, Champions of the USL2 Valley Division.

=== South Bend Cubs ===
The city is home to the South Bend Cubs, a Class A Minor League Baseball team, which plays at Four Winds Field at Coveleski Stadium in downtown South Bend. In 2014, the franchise changed its name and logo to the South Bend Cubs and became affiliated with the Chicago Cubs; prior to this, it had been known as the South Bend Silver Hawks and affiliated with the Arizona Diamondbacks. In 2005, the franchise nearly moved to Marion, Illinois, but a group of investors, led by former Indiana governor and former South Bend mayor Joe Kernan, bought the Silver Hawks in order to ensure the team stayed in South Bend.

==== Buildings and stadium ====
The Ballpark Synagogue is a 1901 synagogue building on the grounds of the ballpark, which serves as the team's fan store. It is the nation's only ballpark synagogue and it is available for weddings and other events. The stadium is also used for multiple community events. In 2015, the South Bend Cubs broke their previous ticket sales record, with a total of 347,678 tickets sold.

=== South Bend Roller Girls ===
The city also hosts the South Bend Roller Girls, the city's non-profit flat-track roller derby league. Founded in March 2010, the league has worked to support fundraising for local charities, such as the Salvation Army's Adopt-A-Family program, the American Cancer Society's Making Strides Against Breast Cancer, and the St. Joe County Humane Society. The South Bend Roller Girls traveling/competitive team, The Studebreakers, is named after the historic Studebaker Corporation. The team is a member of the Women's Flat Track Derby Association.

=== East Race Waterway ===
South Bend is home to the first artificial whitewater center in North America, the East Race Waterway, adjacent to Century Center. The East Race Waterway is one of only four operating artificial whitewater facilities in the United States, the others being Dickerson Whitewater Course (in Dickerson, Maryland), U.S. National Whitewater Center (in Charlotte, North Carolina), Adventure Sports Center International (in McHenry, Maryland), and Riversports Rapids (in Oklahoma City, Oklahoma). The East Race Waterway is one of only six such facilities to have ever been operated in the US, the others being the four aforementioned courses and the now-defunct Ocoee Whitewater Center (in Ducktown, Tennessee). Prior to the opening of Riversports Rapids, the East Race had long been the only such US facility not located in an East Coast state. The waterway is closed as of 2021 because a hydroelectric dam is being built at the source.

=== Other sports ===
During World War II, the South Bend Blue Sox All-American Girls Professional Baseball League team was formed in the city. The team participated in all the league's seasons from 1943 to 1954.

The Blackthorn Golf Course in South Bend is home to the Four Winds Invitational of the Symetra Tour.

The Notre Dame Fighting Irish also provides sports activity the South Bend locale, with football, basketball, and other collegiate sports attracting fans to the region. Along with Notre Dame, South Bend was the site of the VII Special Olympics Summer World Games in 1987. Notre Dame also hosted the 1983 AAU Junior Olympics.

== Parks and recreation ==
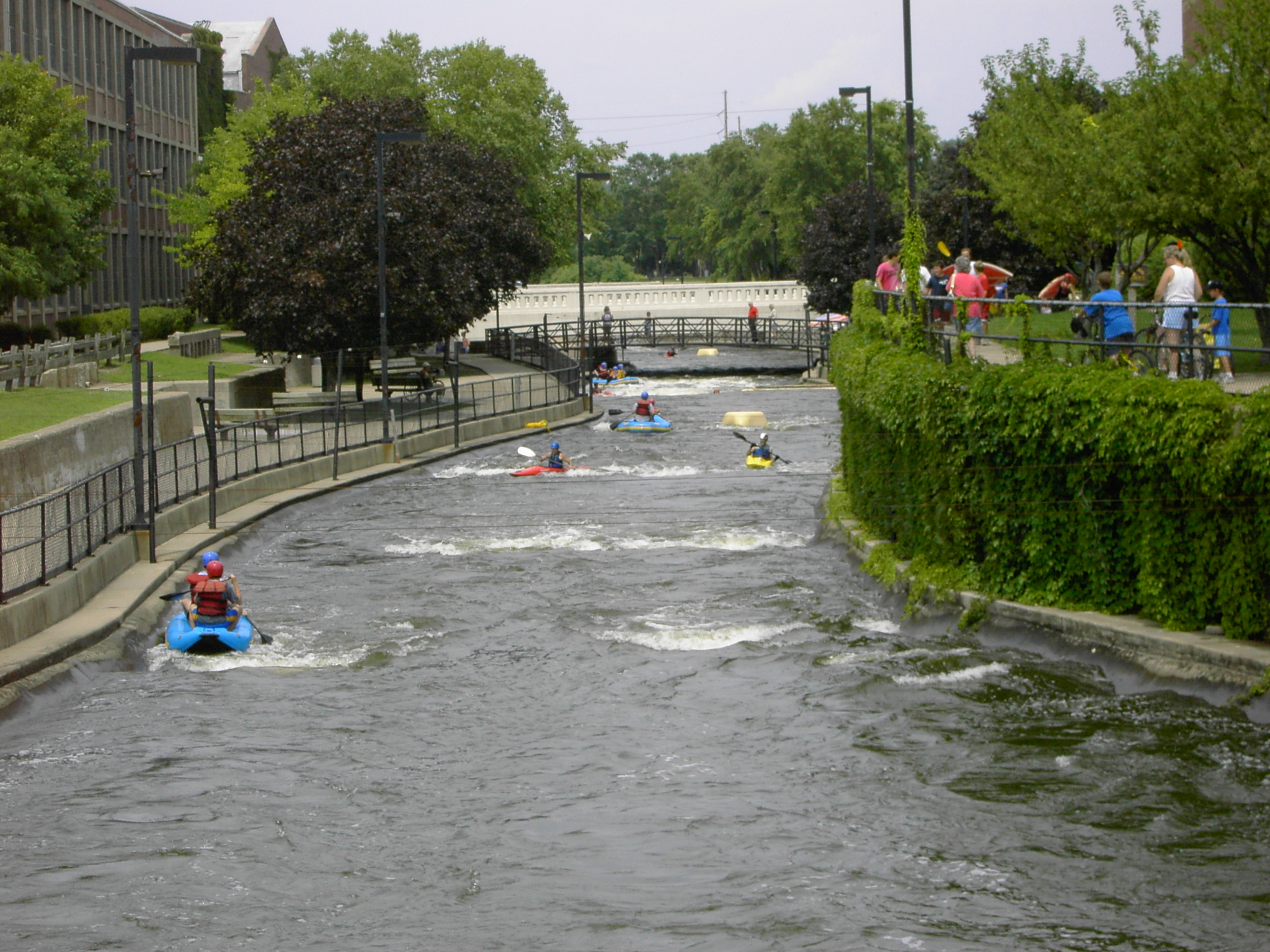
Rafters enjoying the East Race in South Bend, Indiana

South Bend Parks and Recreation department operates over 50 parks, golf courses, and recreational areas throughout the city. Notable parks include Rum Village Park, which has a disc golf course, mountain bike trails, hiking trails, and a nature center, and Potawatomi Park, which has the region's largest Universally Accessible Playground and an outdoors Performance Arts Pavilion and viewing area.

South Bend's first zoo was located at Leeper Park from 1902 until 1914. The present zoo at Potawatomi Park began in 1921 when Albert R. Erskine, the president of the Studebaker Corporation, donated a single deer as the start of the zoo. The Potawatomi Zoo is the second oldest zoo in Indiana. It features more than 400 animals in its 23 acres (93,000 m^{2}). The zoo is now operated by the Potawatomi Zoological Society.

Near the Potawatomi Zoo are the Potawatomi Greenhouses and the Ella Morris and Muessel-Ellison Botanical Conservatories. The greenhouses were originally constructed in the 1920s, with the conservatories added in the 1960s. In 2007, the greenhouses and conservatories were in danger of closing due to increased operating costs, but a campaign by the Botanical Society of South Bend was able to raise funds to keep the facilities operating.

The city is home to the East Race Waterway, which is used for boating and water sports (see above).

While developing the 2006 City Plan, the city's 20-year comprehensive plan, citizens said the encouragement of bicycling as a form of alternative transportation was a top priority. In 2010, South Bend became one of 303 communities in the United States to be recognized as a "Bicycle-Friendly Community" by the League of American Bicyclists due to the city's "remarkable commitments to bicycling. The city has developed a long-term plan for building a 116-mile (187 km) South Bend Bikeway network. As of late 2014, 66.8 miles (107.5 km) of bicycle routes have been established, including 17.4 miles (28.0 km) of multipurpose paths separated from streets, 17.0 miles (27.4 km) of striped bike lanes, and 32.4 miles (52.1 km) of on-street routes bearing other designations. The area is also served by the St. Joseph County Parks Dept, which maintains eight different parks and recreation areas. The Parks department serves the metro area and is headed by a permanent staff and an appointed board.

== Government ==
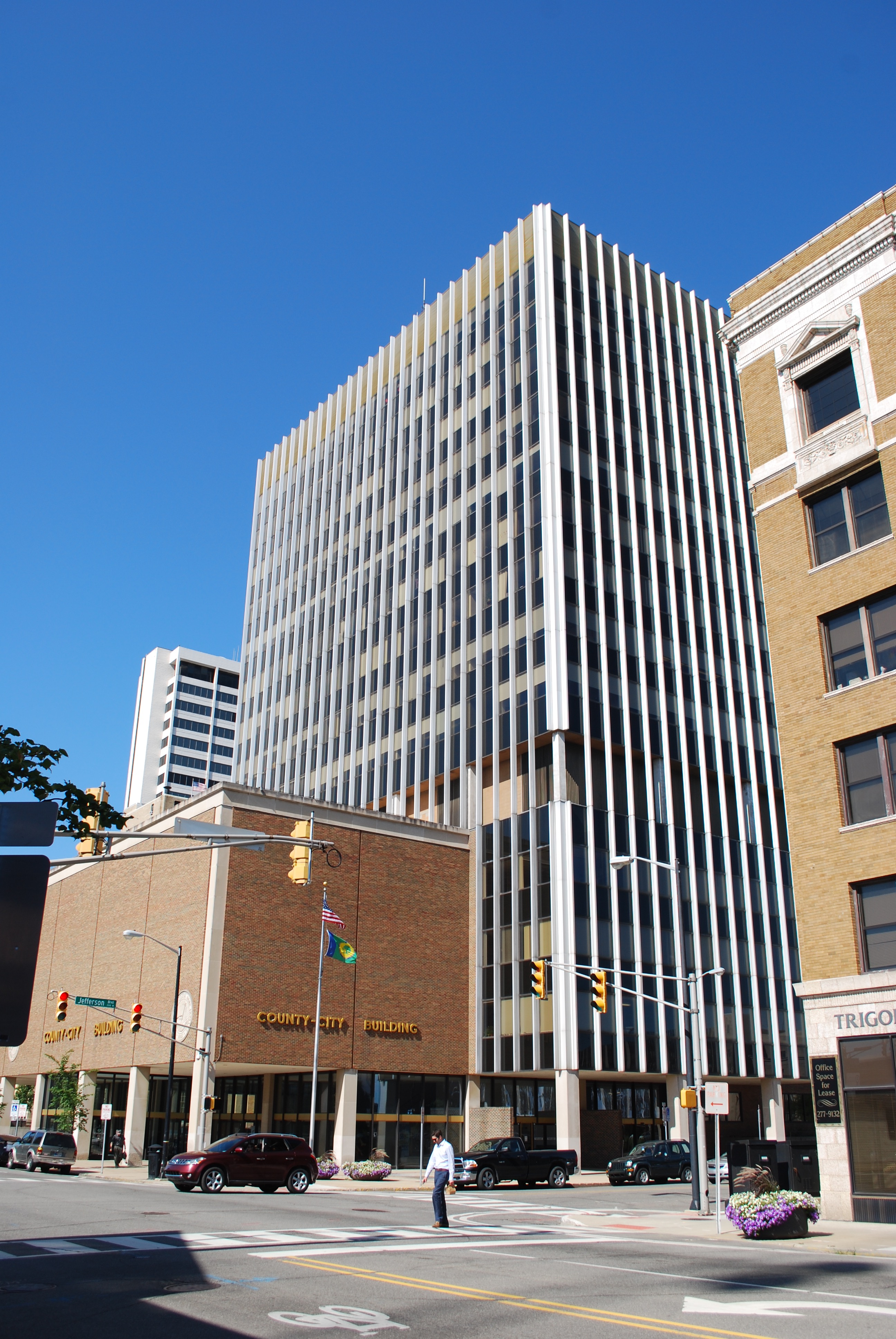
County-City Building in downtown South Bend

South Bend government follows the mayor-council representative model of municipal government and, along with the St. Joseph county government, occupies the County-City Building in downtown South Bend.

The government of South Bend is led by the office of the mayor, who is elected to a four-year term and acts as chief executive for the city government. The current mayor is James Mueller.

The legislative branch of the South Bend government is the South Bend Common Council.

The final elected member of the South Bend government is the city clerk, who is responsible for maintaining official city records and providing general clerical assistance to the City Council. The current clerk is Dawn M. Jones.

Michael A. Dvorak is the prosecuting attorney for the 60th Judicial Circuit, which consists of St. Joseph County. He was first elected in 2002.

=== State and national representation ===
South Bend is represented in the Indiana House of Representatives by Maureen Bauer, Jake Teshka, and Ryan Dvorak, and in the Indiana State Senate by David L. Niezgodski. All members of the Indiana General Assembly representing South Bend are Democrats, except Jake Teshka, who is a Republican.

South Bend is part of Indiana's 2nd Congressional District.

=== Politics ===
The Democratic Party is very successful in South Bend. Every South Bend mayor since 1972 has been a Democrat. As of 2021, all but one City Council member is a Democrat.

On March 26, 2012, South Bend passed the Human Rights Ordinance, outlawing discrimination in employment, housing, or other areas against citizens based on "race, religion, color, sex, disability, national origin, ancestry, sexual orientation or gender identity, or familial status." It is one of only 6 cities in Indiana to offer legal protections for citizens based on sexual orientation and gender identity. The protections are enforced by the city's Human Rights Commission, which oversees investigation and legal recourse in cases of discrimination.

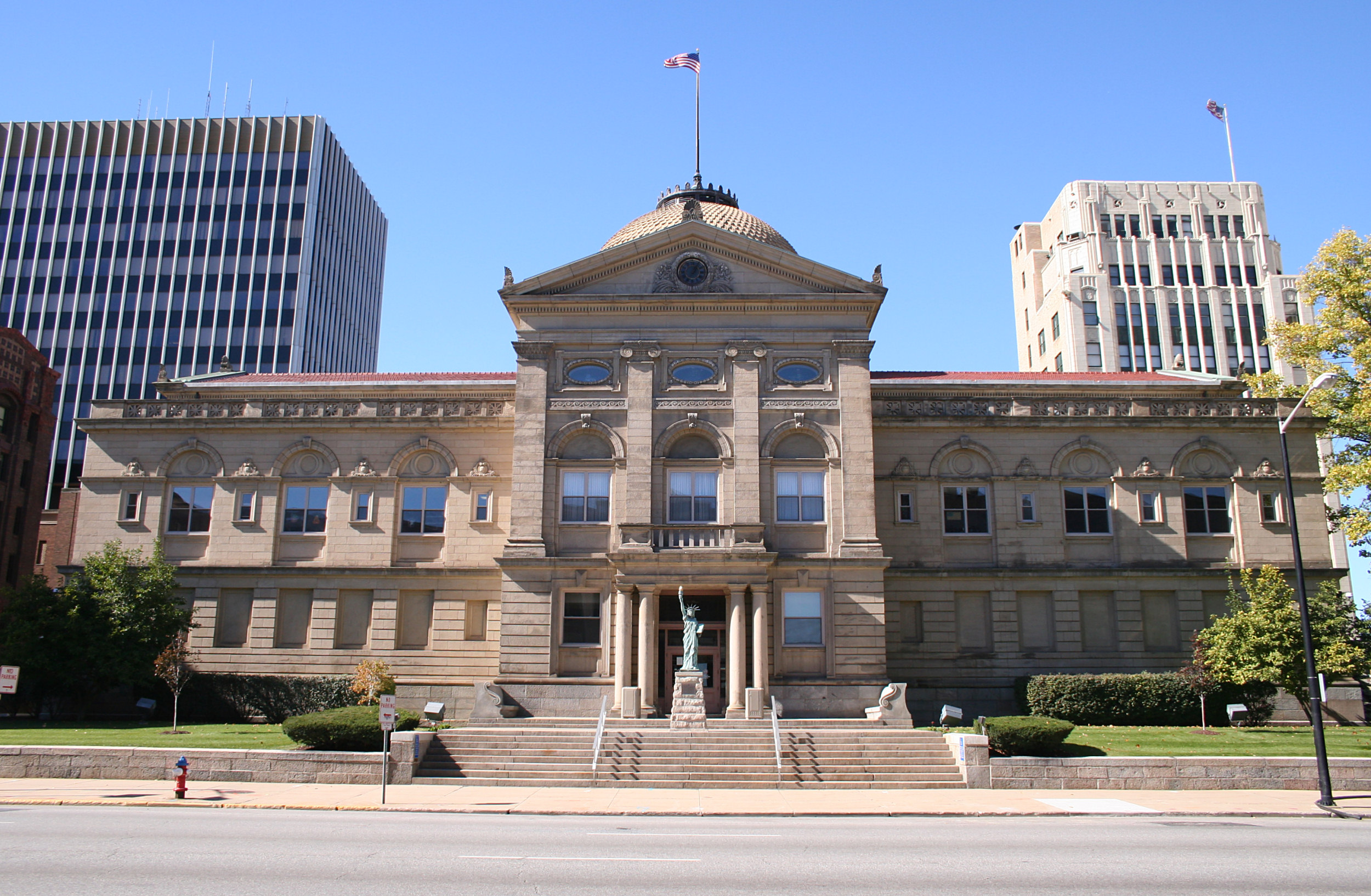
Courthouse in South Bend

On June 16, 2015, then-Mayor Pete Buttigieg announced in a South Bend Tribune editorial that he is gay, becoming the first openly gay executive in the state of Indiana.

== Education ==
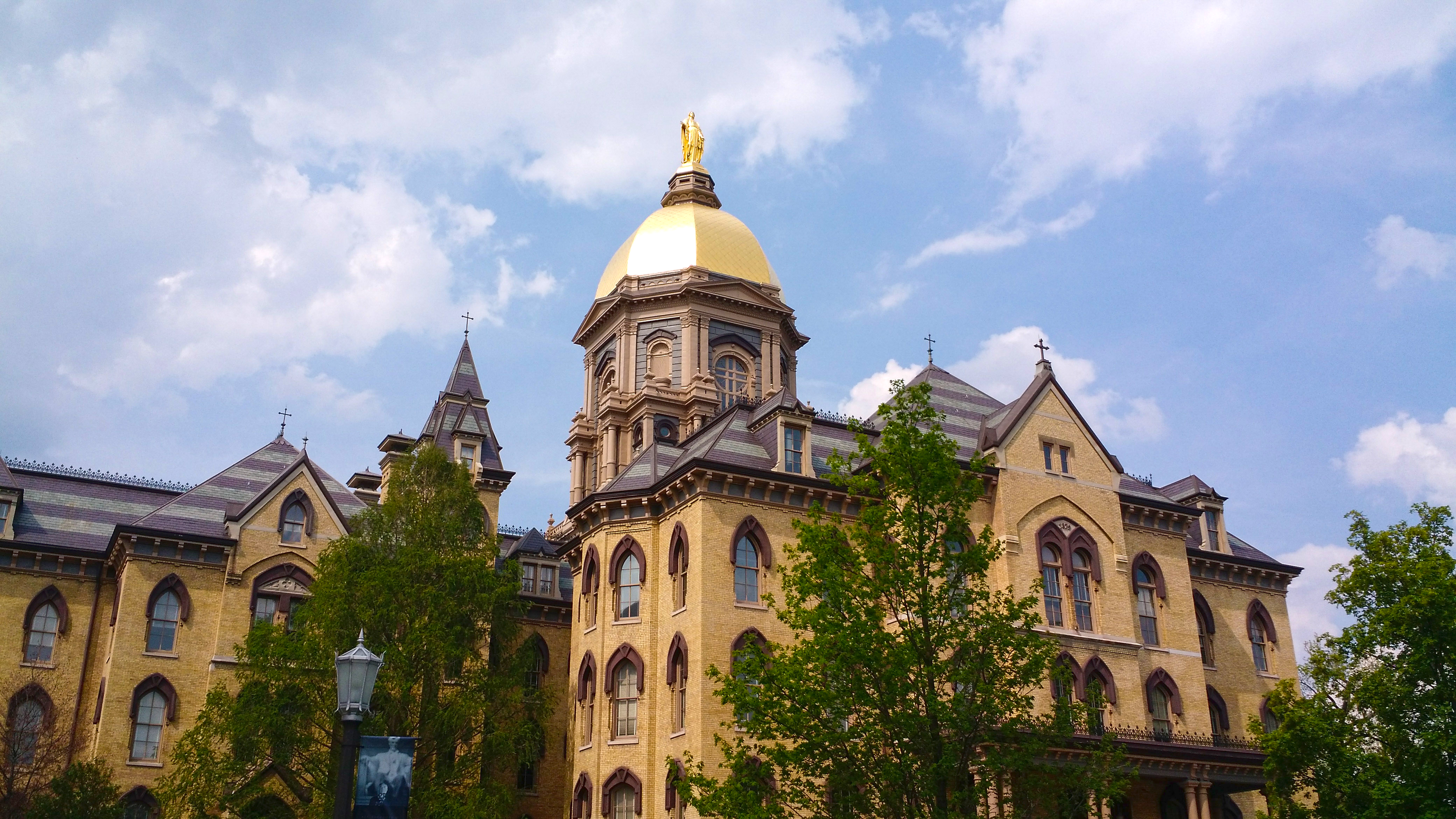
Main Building at the University of Notre Dame

=== Colleges ===
The South Bend area contains several institutions of higher education.

- Indiana University South Bend is the third-largest campus in the Indiana University system. Its total enrollment during the 2019–20 school year was 5,092 students.
- Purdue Polytechnic South Bend
- Ivy Tech Community College
- Trine University
- Pieces of the University of Notre Dame property are in the South Bend city limits.

Colleges located near South Bend:

- Saint Mary's College
- Holy Cross College
- Bethel University

=== K–12 schools ===
The vast majority of South Bend is within the South Bend Community School Corporation, which operates public schools in the city. The corporation runs 17 primary centers (grades K–5), seven intermediate centers (mostly grades 6–8), three high schools (grades 9–12), (Clay High School closed in 2026), and an alternative school (grade 9–12). The school corporation had 16,725 students during the 2019–20 school year. In 2018–19, the school district received an accountability grade overall of C. Purdue Polytechnic High Schools also maintains a campus in South Bend on Lafayette Avenue. Small portions of South Bend are in the Penn-Harris-Madison School Corporation.

There are also several private schools: namely, Trinity School at Greenlawn, recipient of four Blue Ribbon Awards from the U.S. Department of Education, and The Stanley Clark School. Additionally, the Diocese of Fort Wayne-South Bend operates 11 parochial grade schools and one high school in South Bend. This includes St. Joseph School, which is a National Register of Historic Places listing and two-time National Blue Ribbon Award recipient.

== Media ==
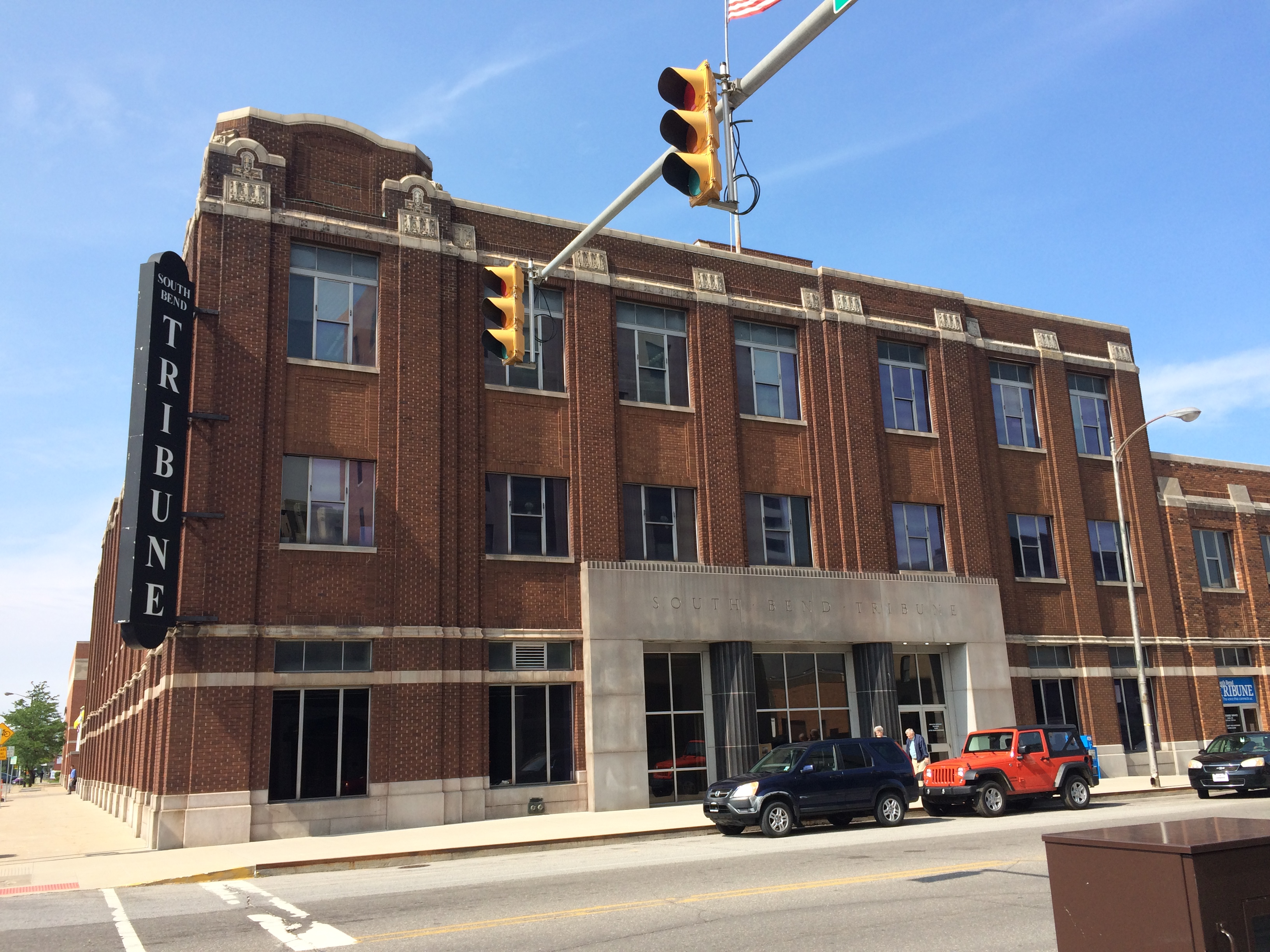
South Bend Tribune former main office

=== Newspaper ===
One major daily newspaper serves the South Bend metro area: the South Bend Tribune.

=== Radio ===
South Bend's radio stations' formats include public radio, sports radio, classical music, religious, country, classic rock, pop, and urban contemporary, among others.

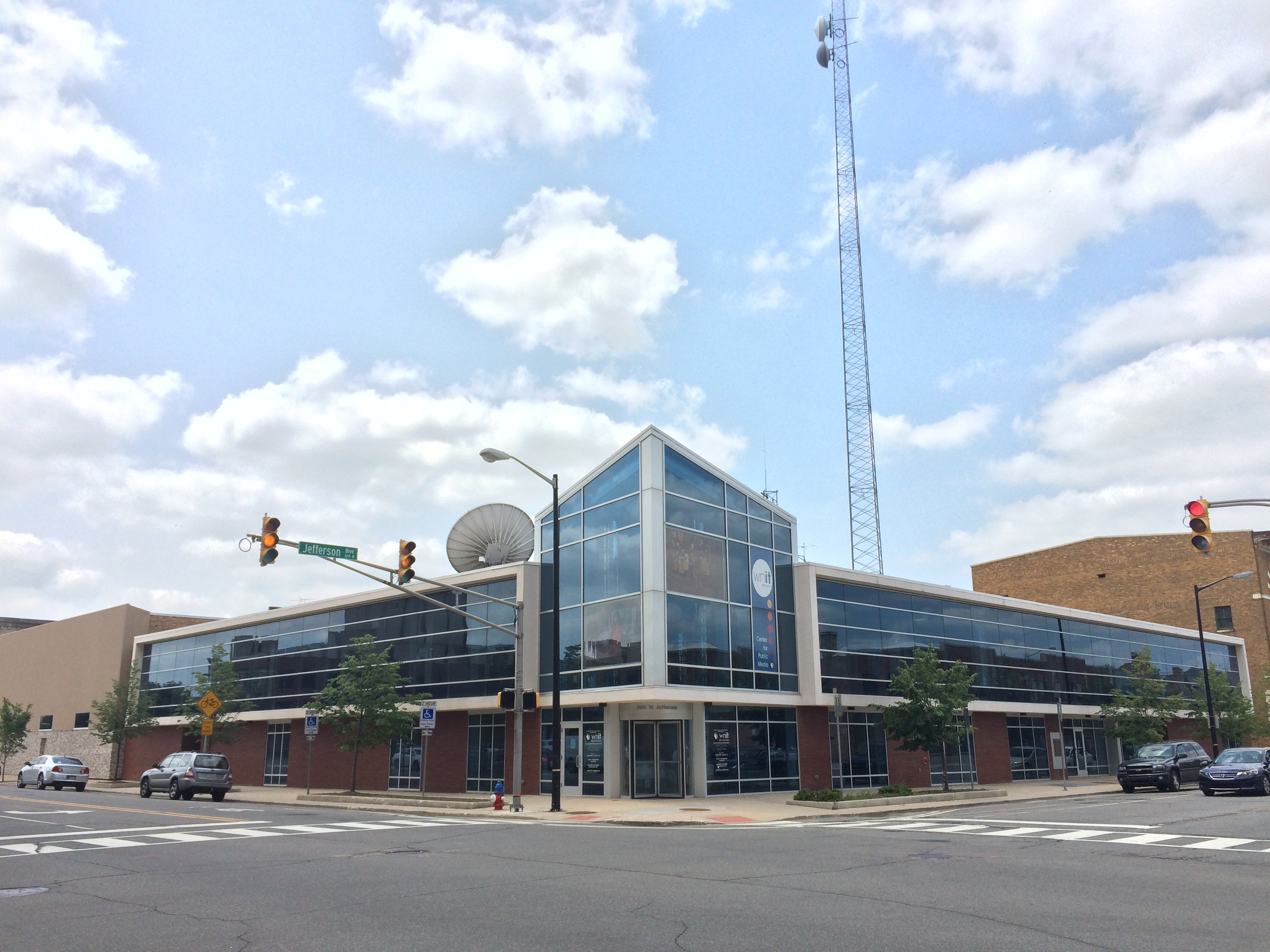
WNIT Center for Public Media in downtown South Bend

=== Television ===
As of the 2016–17 rankings, the South Bend-Elkhart designated market area is the 96th largest market in the United States, with 310,170 homes (0.27% of the U.S. population). Most of the major television networks have affiliates in the Michiana area.

Television stations broadcasting in the Greater South Bend area include:

Cable Channel Number	Call Sign	Network
16	WNDU-TV	NBC
22	WSBT-TV	CBS; Fox (DT2)
25	WCWW-LD	CW
28	WSJV	Roar
34	WNIT-TV	PBS
46	WHME-TV	Univision
57	WBND-LD	ABC; MeTV (DT2)
69	WMYS-LD	MyNetworkTV; Telemundo (DT2)

== Infrastructure ==
=== Transportation ===
==== Roads ====
South Bend's location around the St. Joseph River has influenced the development of its streets. While city streets mainly follow a grid plan, road development also adapted to the river's path. South Bend is connected to state and national highway systems by State Roads 2, 23, and 933; U.S. Route 20 and 31; and Interstate 80 and 90, the Indiana Toll Road. The original routes of both the Lincoln Highway and the Dixie Highway also pass through South Bend. South Bend was also a town along the intrastate Michigan Road.

Parts of Eddy Street, Sample Street, Chapin Avenue, Marion Street, and Madison Street form an incomplete loop around the downtown area; this was formerly referred to as "the innerbelt". Portions of State Roads 23 and 933 follow this route.

For transportation around the South Bend metro area, there is the St. Joseph Valley Parkway, designated in places as US 20, US 31, and State Road 331, which bypasses South Bend to the south and west, and connects to Michigan to the north and the greater Elkhart area to the east. The Indiana Toll Road (Interstates 80 and 90) passes through northern South Bend.

==== Intercity bus service ====
South Bend is served by a single Greyhound station. The busses had operated out of the airport until 2019, when they relocated to a leased portion of the South Street Station.

==== Transit ====
Public transportation in South Bend is controlled by Transpo (South Bend Public Transportation Corporation). Transpo operates bus routes between stations located in South Bend and Mishawaka and provides services to the towns of Osceola and Roseland, from Monday through Saturday. In 2006, the Transpo fleet switched to biodiesel fuel. In 2015, Transpo added 16 new buses powered by compressed natural gas. The Transpo facility is also the first LEED Platinum transit facility in the country. The South Street Station serves as the main hub for most passengers, with multiple platforms and buses arriving frequently. Connections can be made to the Interurban Trolley in Mishawaka.

==== Aviation ====
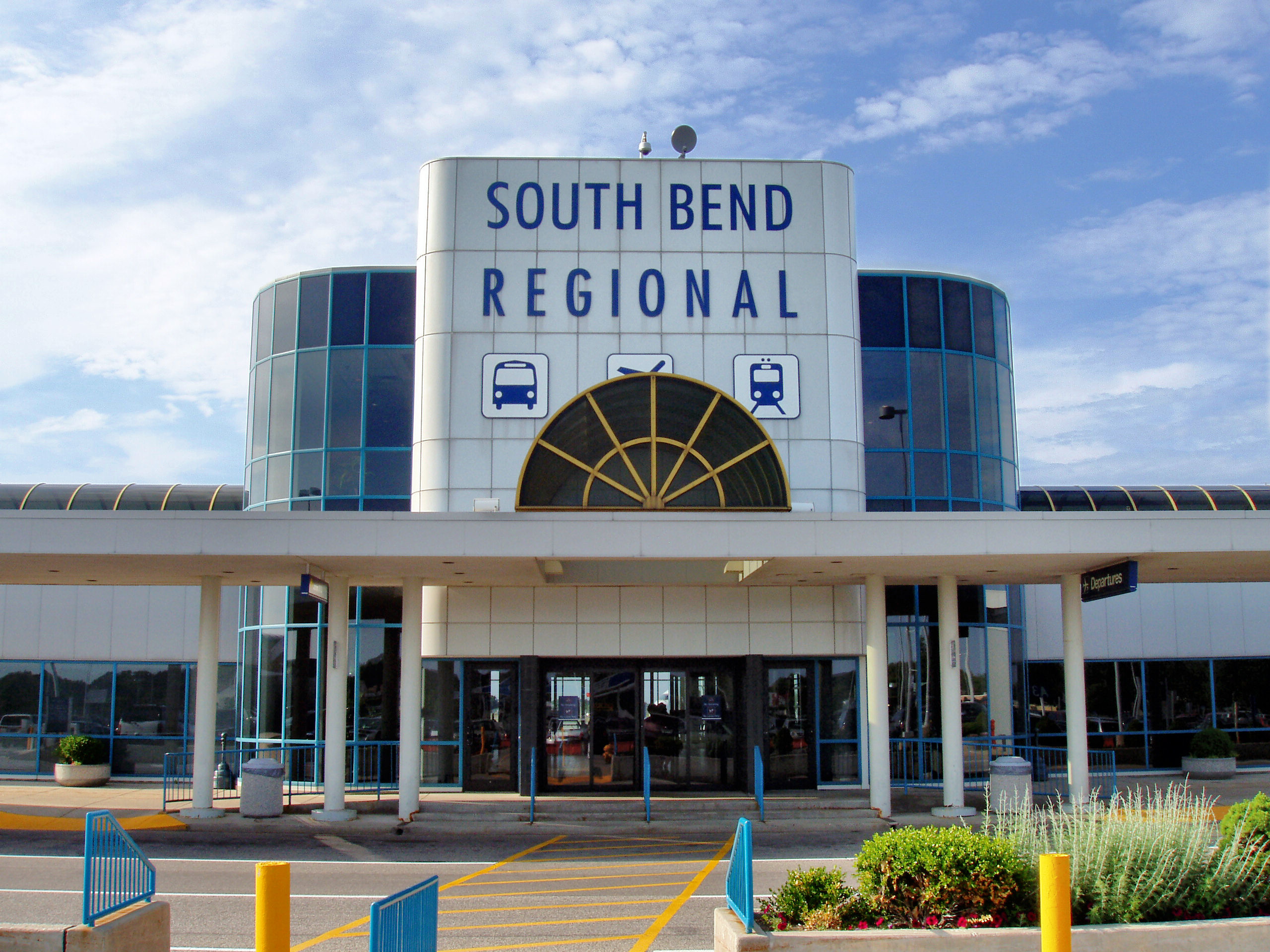
South Bend Regional Airport in 2005; since renamed to South Bend International Airport

South Bend serves as the transportation hub for Michiana. The South Bend International Airport lies off of U.S. 31 and the Indiana Toll Road in the northwest corner of South Bend. The airport connects South Bend to larger hubs including Atlanta, Charlotte, Chicago, Dallas, Las Vegas, Minneapolis, Orlando, Phoenix, Punta Gorda, Sarasota, and St. Petersburg, Florida. In April 2014, the airport changed its name from "South Bend Regional Airport" to the current "South Bend International" after receiving International designation from U.S. Customs and Border Protection. Final design plans are being approved for a Federal Inspection Station and General Aviation Facility. The airport welcomed its first international arrival through the General Aviation Facility in June 2017.

==== Rail ====
The South Shore Line, an electric commuter railroad, runs from South Bend International Airport station seven times a day (five on weekends) to Millennium Station in downtown Chicago. A once-daily limited-stop express service was added in 2015 on weekdays, with trains taking 1 hour and 55 minutes from South Bend to Chicago. Travel times between Chicago and South Bend were reduced in the 2020s after the double-tracking of previously single-tracked portions of the South Shore Line between Michigan City and Illinois. The South Shore Line Airport Realignment project is planned to replace this station with a new one on the west side of the airport, having the advantage of further reducing travel times.

Amtrak, the national passenger rail system, provides service to South Bend Station via two trains a day, the Lake Shore Limited between Chicago and New York City or Boston, and the Capitol Limited between Chicago and Washington, D.C. A bus line connects Notre Dame and the South Bend airport to Chicago's O'Hare and Midway airports, with several northwest Indiana stops.

South Bend had electric streetcars from 1885 until the 1930s. In 2021, a group proposed the concept of building a new streetcar system, running from the University of Notre Dame, through South Bend, to Mishawaka.

=== Utilities ===
Electricity in South Bend is provided by Indiana Michigan Power, a subsidiary of American Electric Power. Natural gas is supplied by the Northern Indiana Public Service Company (NIPSCO), a subsidiary of NiSource.

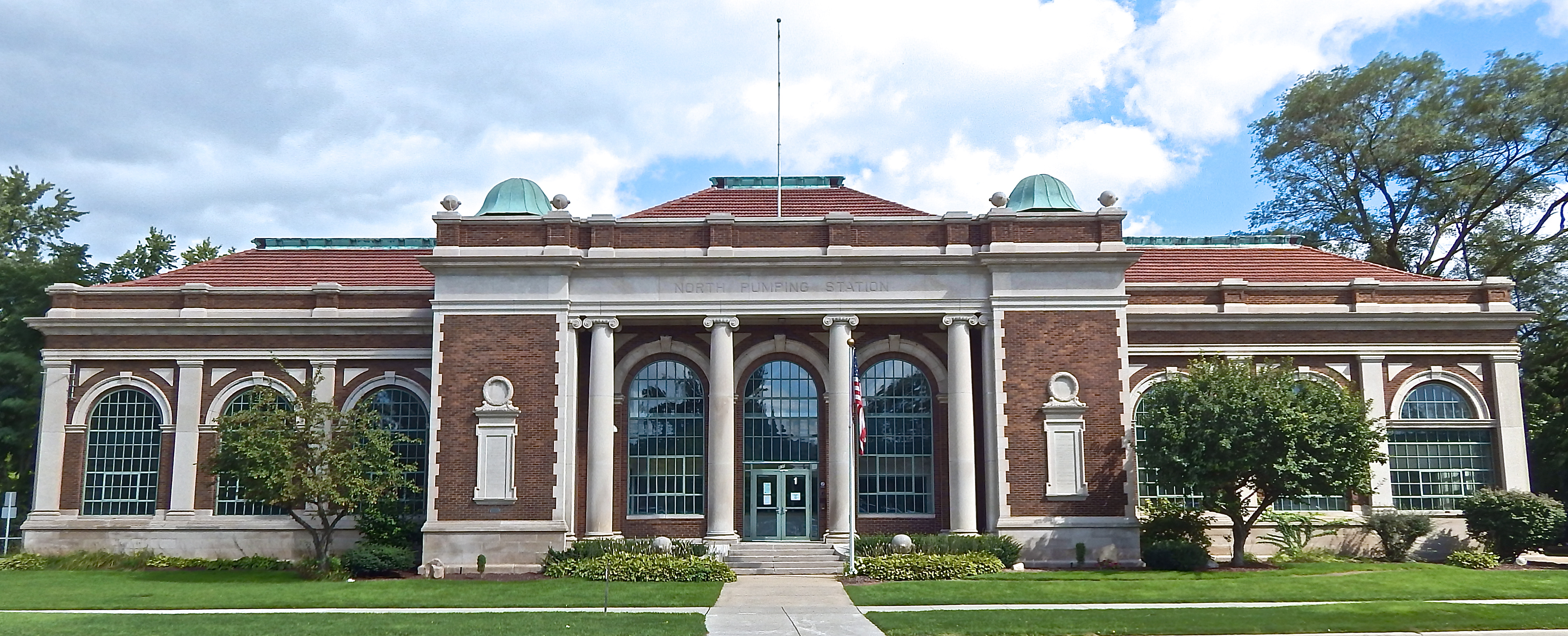
North Pumping Station, just outside downtown South Bend, was built in 1912, and is in the National Register of Historic Places.

The South Bend Water Works deliver water to residents of South Bend. The water is collected from 32 deep wells and runs through 545 miles (877 km) of water main to be distributed to South Bend residents. In 2008, in order to increase the efficiency of its sewer system, South Bend began the installation of an array of intelligent sensors and valves allowing it to become the first city to migrate its sewer system management to the cloud. When a section of the system is under heavy use, this system can divert flow to other, less busy, sections. This more efficient system has helped to save the city an estimated $100 million in new sewage pipes.

=== Law enforcement ===
The police force in South Bend has undergone many changes and expansions in its history, starting in 1831 when the first constables were appointed. Law enforcement was reorganized and renamed multiple times throughout its history, until the department became officially known as the South Bend Police Department in 1903. Scott Ruszkowski has served as chief since 2015.

=== Environmental initiatives ===
In 2015, South Bend engaged in a partnership with the University of Notre Dame to revitalize the Bowman Creek ecosystem. Bowman Creek is a tributary of the St. Joseph River in South Bend that has suffered from contamination. The Bowman Creek initiative included partners from local high schools, colleges, and business leaders focused on improvements to both the creek and the neighborhoods. The vision for the collaboration is to institute a unique water quality monitoring system, similar to South Bend's combined sewer overflow system.

== Sister cities ==
South Bend has four sister cities:

- Częstochowa (Poland)
- Arzberg, Bavaria (Germany)
- Guanajuato (Mexico)
- Bergisch Gladbach, North Rhine-Westphalia (Germany)
