= Dune Acres Clubhouse =

- U.S. National Register of Historic Places
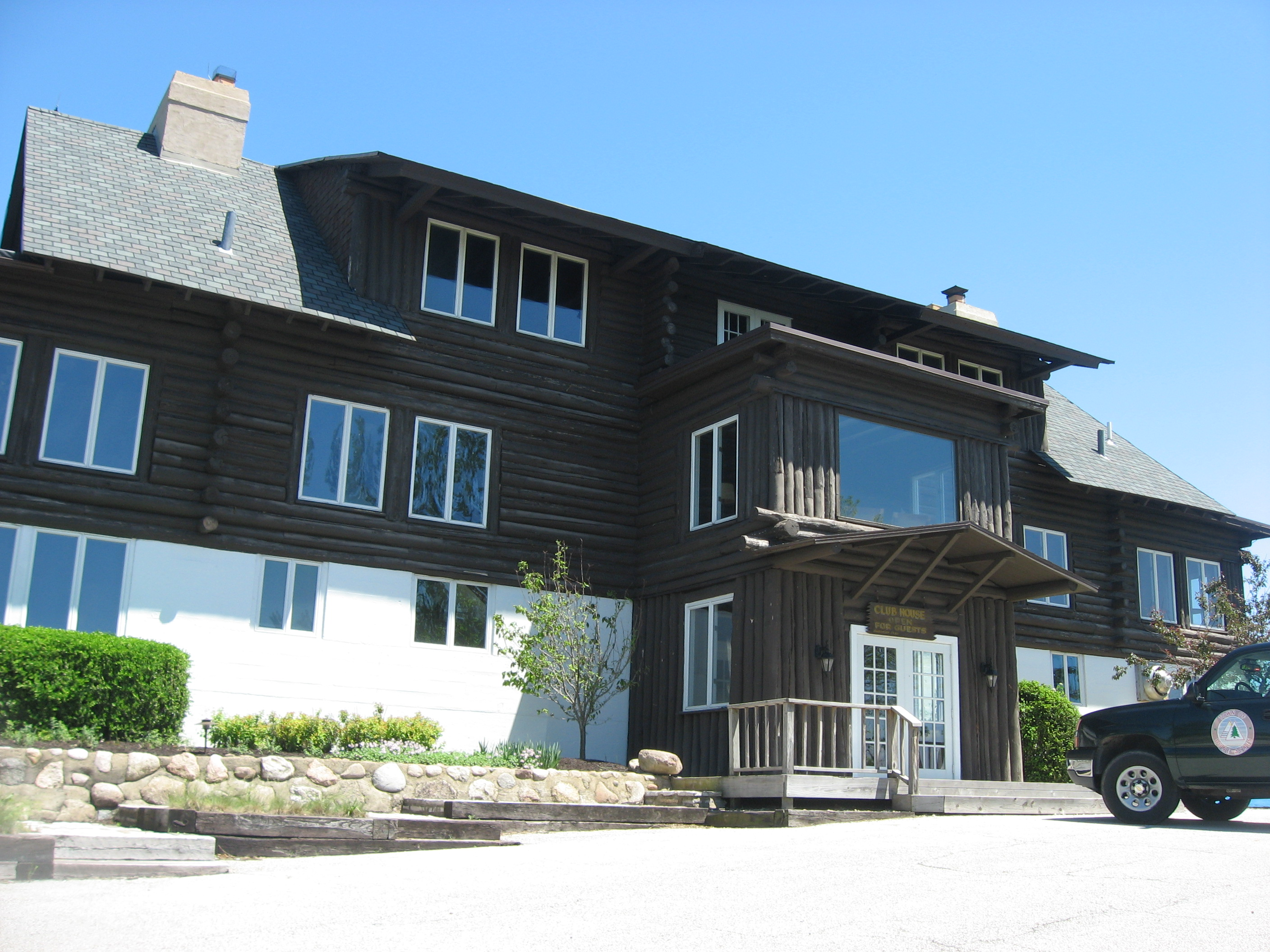
- Dune Acres Clubhouse, June 2013

- Location within Indiana Location within the United States
- Location: Clubhouse Dr., Dune Acres, Indiana
- Coordinates: 41°39′11″N 87°5′10″W
- Area: less than one acre
- Built: 1925
- Architect: Studebaker, Alden
- Architectural style: Bungalow/craftsman
- NRHP reference No.: 06001295
- Added to NRHP: January 25, 2007

Dune Acres Clubhouse is a historic clubhouse located at Dune Acres, Indiana. It was built in 1925, and is a three-story, Bungalow / American Craftsman style building. It has a gable roof and is constructed of reinforced concrete and chinked horizontal logs on the two upper floors.

It was listed on the National Register of Historic Places in 2007.
