= McCormick Place station =

Commuter rail station in Chicago, Illinois

McCormick Place

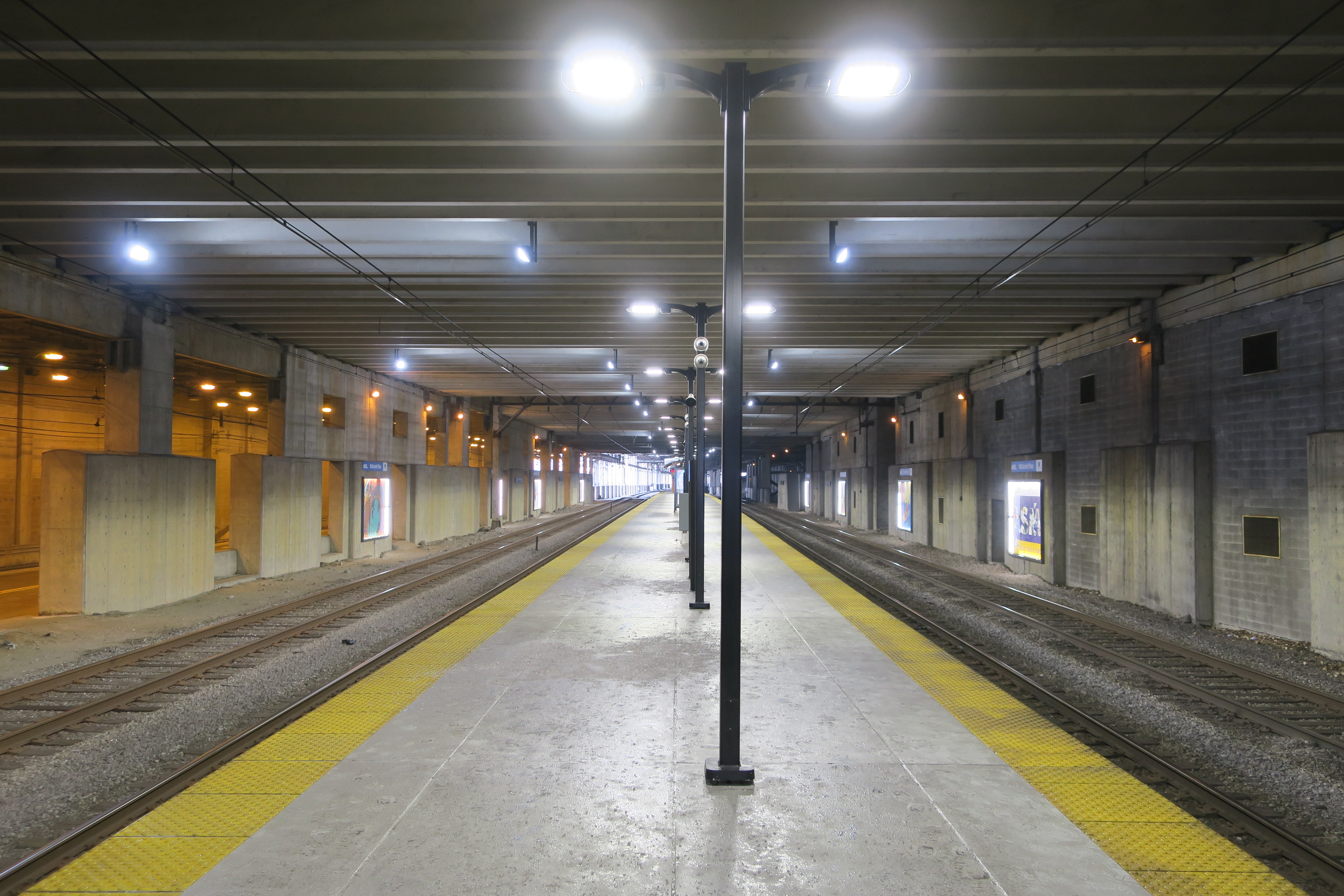
- McCormick Place station in March 2019.

General information
- Location: 23rd Street, between King Drive & Lake Shore Drive; Near South Side, Chicago, Illinois
- Coordinates: 41°51′06″N 87°36′58″W
- Owner: Metra
- Line: University Park Sub District
- Platforms: 1 island platform
- Tracks: 4

Construction
- Structure type: Underground
- Accessible: Yes

Other information
- Fare zone: 2

History
- Electrified: 1926
- Former names: 23rd Street

Passengers
- 2018: 124 (average weekday) ▲14.8% (Metra)
- Rank: 179 out of 236

Services
Preceding station	Metra	Following station
27th Street toward University Park, South Chicago or Blue Island	Metra Electric	18th Street toward Millennium
Special events services
Preceding station	NICTD	Following station
57th Street toward South Bend International Airport	Lakeshore Corridor For events at McCormick Place	Museum Campus/11th Street toward Millennium Station
Former services
Preceding station	Illinois Central Railroad	Following station
27th Street toward Richton, 91st Street or Blue Island	Electric Suburban	18th Street toward Randolph Street
Preceding station	NICTD	Following station
55th–56th–57th Street toward South Bend Airport	South Shore Line (Note: Discontinued 2024, except for special events)	Museum Campus/11th Street toward Millennium Station
Preceding station	Chicago South Shore and South Bend Railroad	Following station
53rd Street toward South Bend	South Shore Line	Roosevelt Road toward Randolph Street
Track layout
Location

McCormick Place station is a commuter rail station in Chicago underneath McCormick Place, Chicago's main convention center, that serves the Metra Electric District north to the Millennium Station and south to University Park, Blue Island, and South Chicago. Since August 2024, South Shore Line trains, which travel to Gary and South Bend, Indiana, only stop there in exceptional cases like special events.

== Structure ==
The main entrance to the station is from the Grand Concourse in the South Building of McCormick Place. A passageway from the concourse leads to a waiting room, which contains seats and displays showing upcoming arrivals. The platform is accessed from the waiting room via a single staircase and elevator at the north end.

Immediately north of the station, still underneath McCormick Place, the adjacent freight tracks cross over the Metra mainline, switching from running west of the Metra tracks and diverging towards Downtown Chicago to the north of the station to east of and directly adjacent to the Metra tracks for the remainder of the line to University Park.

== History ==
The original station in this vicinity opened in 1868 at 22nd Street, originally consisting of a wooden station building and serving both suburban trains as well as long distance passenger trains. This station served as a temporary terminal for the Illinois Central and Michigan Central railroads after the Great Chicago Fire inflicted significant damage on Great Central Station, rendering it unsuitable as the line's primary terminal. In 1880, the wooden station building was replaced with a brick building. In 1907, long-distance trains ceased stopping there, leaving only suburban trains.

In 1926, the original station at 22nd Street was closed and a new station was opened as its replacement at 23rd Street in conjunction with the Illinois Central Railroad's electrification program.

When McCormick Place was expanded in 1996, the South Building was built over the existing 23rd Street station, which was then reconfigured to serve the expanded convention center. This reconfiguration was accompanied by replacing an outdated wooden platform with a newer concrete platform.

In 2017, a series of upgrades were performed on the station. These upgrades included mural paintings, digital signage and audio announcements, better lighting, and better signage. Additionally, Metra is investigating the possibility of adding a crossover track to the south of the station to allow more trains to access the platform from the outer tracks.

Beginning on August 20, 2024, South Shore Line trains no longer stop at McCormick Place station on weekends, ending regular service at the station. However, certain trains occasionally stop at this station to serve special events in the convention center.

== Service ==
Select Metra Electric District trains stop at McCormick Place on weekdays, while most trains stop on weekends. All three branches have trains stopping at McCormick Place. As of 2018, McCormick Place is the 179th busiest of Metra's 236 non-downtown stations, with an average of 124 weekday boardings.

The South Shore Line stops at McCormick Place for special events only and will not board passengers northbound or discharge passengers southbound.

== Bus connections ==
CTA bus routes

- 3 King Drive
- 21 Cermak
