= 63rd Street station (Metra) =

Commuter rail station in Chicago, Illinois

63rd Street

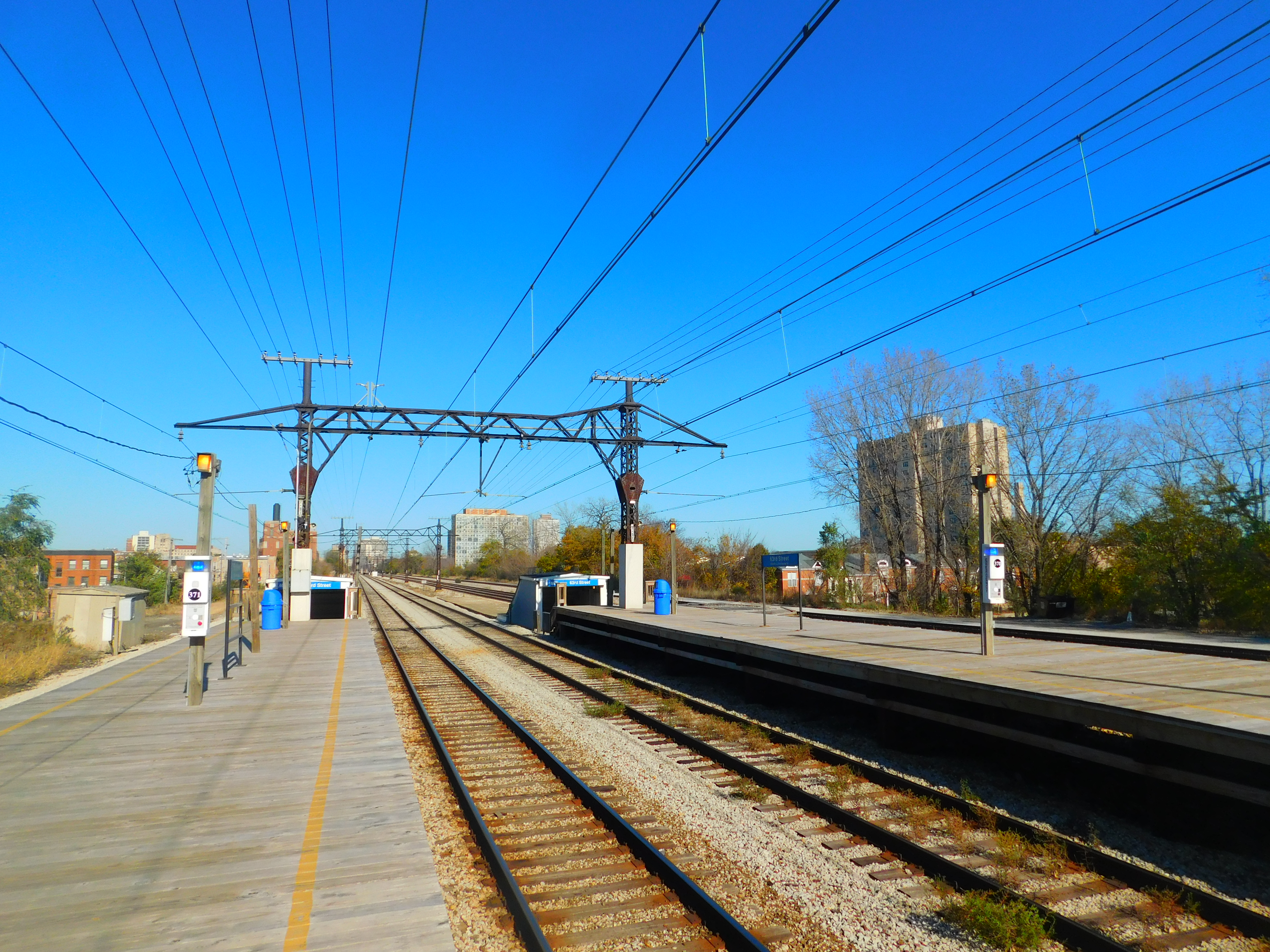
- 63rd Street station in November 2016.

General information
- Location: 63rd Street and Dorchester Street; Woodlawn, Chicago, Illinois
- Coordinates: 41.779785°N 87.590539°W
- Owner: Metra
- Line: University Park Sub District
- Platforms: 2 island platforms
- Tracks: 4
- Connections: CTA Bus

Construction
- Accessible: No

Other information
- Fare zone: 2 (Metra and South Shore)

History
- Opened: 1903
- Electrified: 1926
- Former names: Woodlawn Park; 63rd Street (Woodlawn)

Passengers
- 2018: 167 (avg. weekday) ▼44.1% (Metra)
- Rank: 169 out of 236

Services
Preceding station	Metra	Following station
75th Street/Grand Crossing toward University Park or Blue Island	Metra Electric Main Line & Blue Island Branch	59th/60th Street toward Millennium
Stony Island toward South Chicago	Metra Electric South Chicago Branch	59th/60th Street toward Millennium
Preceding station	NICTD	Following station
Hegewisch toward South Bend Airport	Lakeshore Corridor	57th Street toward Millennium Station
Monon Corridor does not stop here
Former services
Preceding station	NICTD	Following station
57th Street toward Millennium Station	South Shore Line	115th Street/Kensington toward South Bend
Preceding station	Chicago South Shore and South Bend Railroad	Following station
53rd Street toward Randolph Street	South Shore Line	115th Street/Kensington toward South Bend
Preceding station	Illinois Central Railroad	Following station
Kensington toward New Orleans	Main Line	53rd Street toward Chicago
67th Street toward Richton, 91st Street or Blue Island	Electric Suburban	59th Street toward Randolph Street
Preceding station	New York Central Railroad	Following station
Kensington toward Detroit	Michigan Central Railroad Main Line	Chicago Terminus
Kensington toward Cincinnati	Chicago – Cincinnati	Chicago Terminus
Preceding station	Chesapeake and Ohio Railway	Following station
Hammond toward Cincinnati	Chicago, Cincinnati & Louisville Railroad 1907–1911; 1925–1933	Chicago Terminus
Track layout
Location

63rd Street station is a commuter rail station within the city of Chicago that serves the Metra Electric District north to Millennium Station and south to University Park, Blue Island, and the Chicago neighborhood of South Chicago and the South Shore Line to Gary and South Bend, Indiana. Most South Shore Line trains do not stop at this station, except for one inbound train during the AM rush and two outbound trains during the PM rush on weekdays on the Lakeshore Corridor. As of 2018, the station is the 169th busiest of Metra's 236 non-downtown stations, with an average of 167 weekday boardings.

== History ==
The station, originally named Woodlawn, was built by the Illinois Central Railroad (ICRR) in 1903, and served both ICRR commuter trains and long-distance passenger trains until the railroad relinquished its passenger train service to Amtrak in 1971. A large combination station and office building for the Illinois Central was built in 1917, and demolished in the 1980s. The station had another island platform between the two non-electrified tracks on the eastern side to serve Illinois Central and some New York Central long-distance trains. It is now removed, but evidence still remains.

Named trains making stops at Woodlawn:

- Illinois Central:
  - City of New Orleans (to New Orleans)
  - Green Diamond (to St. Louis)
  - Louisiane (to New Orleans)
  - Panama Limited (to New Orleans)
  - Seminole (to Jacksonville, Florida)
- New York Central:
  - Cincinnati Special (to Cincinnati)
  - James Whitcomb Riley (to Cincinnati)

== Recent years ==
This also serves as a stop for Mount Carmel High School students, which is directly across from the station. The station was originally used as a local and express station until the schedules were shifted in 1975 to make 55th–56th–57th Street station the express station.

This is the last stop on the main line for trains of the South Chicago branch, which splits off south of the station. Prior to 1982, the Jackson Park branch of the South Side 'L' crossed the Metra Electric tracks on a bridge just north of this station. Trains stopped at nearby Dorchester station.

== Bus connections ==
CTA

- 63 63rd (Owl Service)
