= 18th Street station (Illinois) =

Commuter rail station in Chicago, Illinois

18th Street/Soldier Field

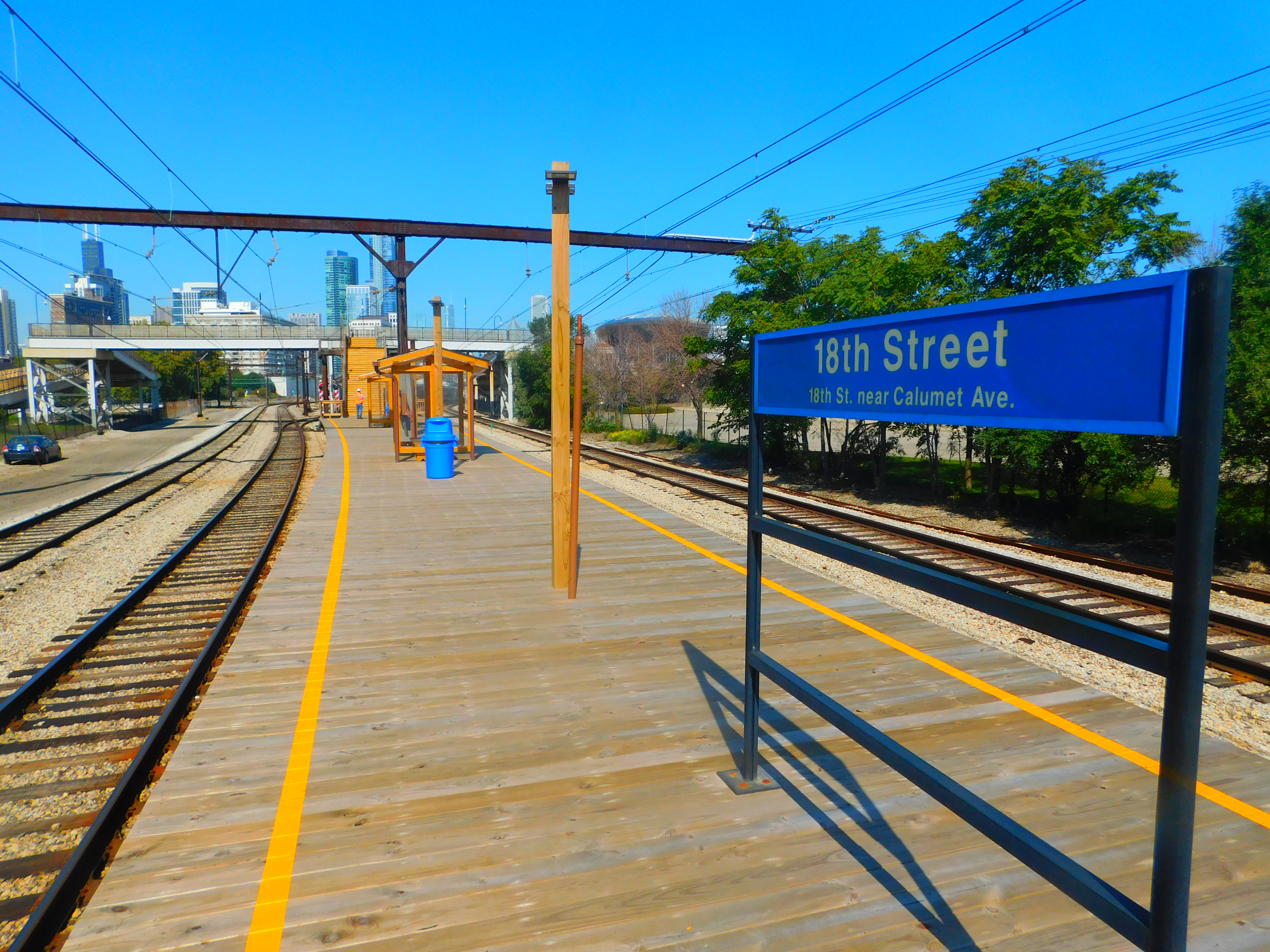
- 18th Street station in October 2015.

General information
- Location: 18th Street near Calumet Avenue; Near South Side, Chicago, Illinois
- Coordinates: 41.85790°N 87.61792°W
- Owner: Metra
- Line: University Park Sub District
- Platforms: 1 island platform
- Tracks: 4

Construction
- Accessible: No

Other information
- Fare zone: 2

History
- Electrified: 1926

Passengers
- 2018: 23 (average weekday) ▼45.2%
- Rank: 226 out of 236

Services
Preceding station	Metra	Following station
McCormick Place toward University Park, South Chicago or Blue Island	Metra Electric	Museum Campus/11th Street toward Millennium
Special events services
Preceding station	NICTD	Following station
57th Street toward South Bend International Airport	Lakeshore Corridor Game days at Soldier Field	Museum Campus/11th Street toward Millennium Station
Former services
Preceding station	Illinois Central Railroad	Following station
23rd Street toward Richton, 91st Street or Blue Island	Electric Suburban	Roosevelt Road toward Randolph Street
Track layout
Location

18th Street station is a commuter rail station on the Near South Side of Chicago, at 18th Street near Calumet Avenue. It serves the Metra Electric District north to Millennium Station and south to University Park, Blue Island, and South Chicago. As of 2018, 18th Street is the 226th busiest of Metra's 236 non-downtown stations, with an average of 23 weekday boardings.

The station is also occasionally served by South Shore Line trains from Gary and South Bend, Indiana, on an exceptional basis for Chicago Bears home games during football season. As part of a non-compete agreement with Metra, eastbound South Shore trains can only board passengers at stops along the Metra Electric, and westbound trains can only discharge passengers.

The station was originally built by the Illinois Central Railroad (ICRR). The railroad was first built in 1907.
