= 55th/56th/57th Street station =

Commuter rail station in Chicago, Illinois

55th/56th/57th Street

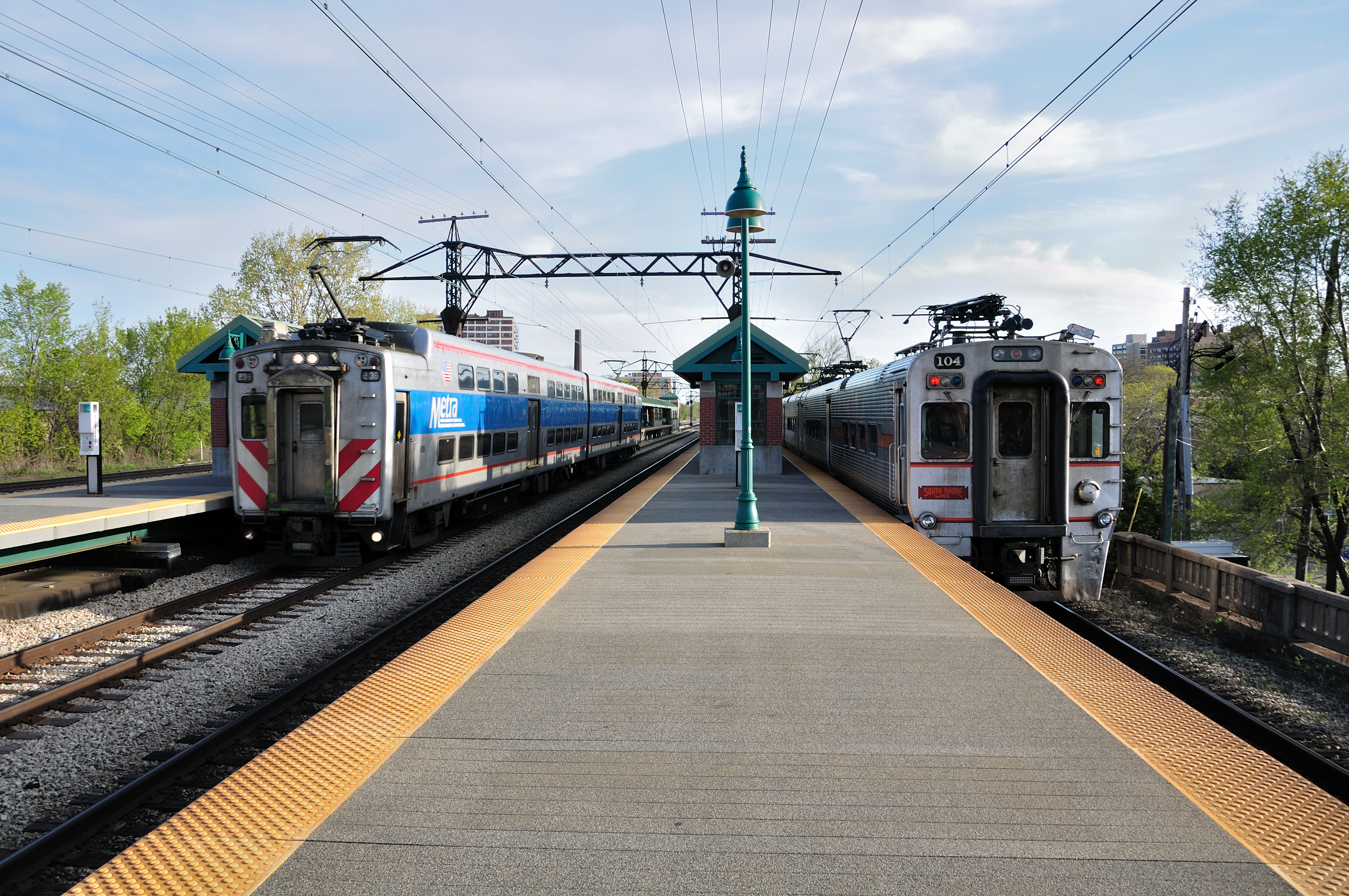
- An inbound Metra Electric train of Highliner cars (left) and an outbound South Shore Line train (right) meeting

General information
- Location: 55th to 57th Streets, at Lake Park Avenue; Hyde Park, Chicago, Illinois
- Coordinates: 41.793354°N 87.587476°W
- Line: University Park Sub District
- Platforms: 2 island platforms
- Tracks: 4
- Connections: CTA Bus

Construction
- Accessible: Yes

Other information
- Fare zone: 2 (Metra and South Shore)

History
- Rebuilt: 2002
- Electrified: 1926

Passengers
- 2018: 1,133 (avg. weekday) ▼26.5% (Metra)
- Rank: 39 out of 236

Services
Preceding station	Metra	Following station
59th/60th Street toward University Park, South Chicago or Blue Island	Metra Electric	51st/53rd Street toward Millennium
Preceding station	NICTD	Following station
63rd Street toward South Bend Airport	Lakeshore Corridor	Museum Campus/11th Street toward Millennium Station
Hegewisch toward Munster/Dyer	Monon Corridor peak hours	Museum Campus/11th Street toward Millennium Station
Special events services
Preceding station	NICTD	Following station
63rd Street toward South Bend International Airport	Lakeshore Corridor	18th Street or McCormick Place toward Millennium Station
Former services
Preceding station	Illinois Central Railroad	Following station
59th Street toward Richton, 91st Street or Blue Island	Electric Suburban	53rd Street toward Randolph Street
Track layout
Location

55th–56th–57th Street is a commuter rail station in Hyde Park, Chicago that serves the Metra Electric District north to Millennium Station and south to University Park, Blue Island, and South Chicago; and the South Shore Line to Gary and South Bend, Indiana. The South Shore Line calls the station 57th Street. It is the closest station to the Museum of Science and Industry, and also serves the residential neighborhood adjoining the University of Chicago.

As of 2018, the station is the 39th busiest of Metra's 236 non-downtown stations, with an average of 1,133 weekday boardings.

55th–56th–57th Street is the nearest ADA accessible station to the Obama Presidential Center. Riders can also access the center via 59th/60th Street/University of Chicago station located across the street.

== History ==
The South Shore Line began stopping at 57th Street on October 16, 1966, at noon. Prior to this, the South Shore Line had stopped at 53rd Street. The switch was made to better serve the University of Chicago and the Museum of Science and Industry. South Shore Line service was withdrawn from the station by 1985, with service returning by 2009.

This station, and the adjacent 53rd Street station, were rebuilt in 2002 with concrete platforms to replace wooden platforms built in the 1920s.

Until November 2014 (when the staffed station closed), this was the only station along the route outside of Downtown Chicago's two main stations that had a staffed ticket office, as many express trains on both lines stop at the station and it is the South Side's main station.

== Bus connections ==
CTA

- 15 Jeffery Local
- 28 Stony Island
- 55 Garfield (Owl Service)
- 171 University of Chicago/Hyde Park
