= Museum Campus/11th Street station =

Commuter rail station in Chicago, Illinois

Museum Campus 11th Street

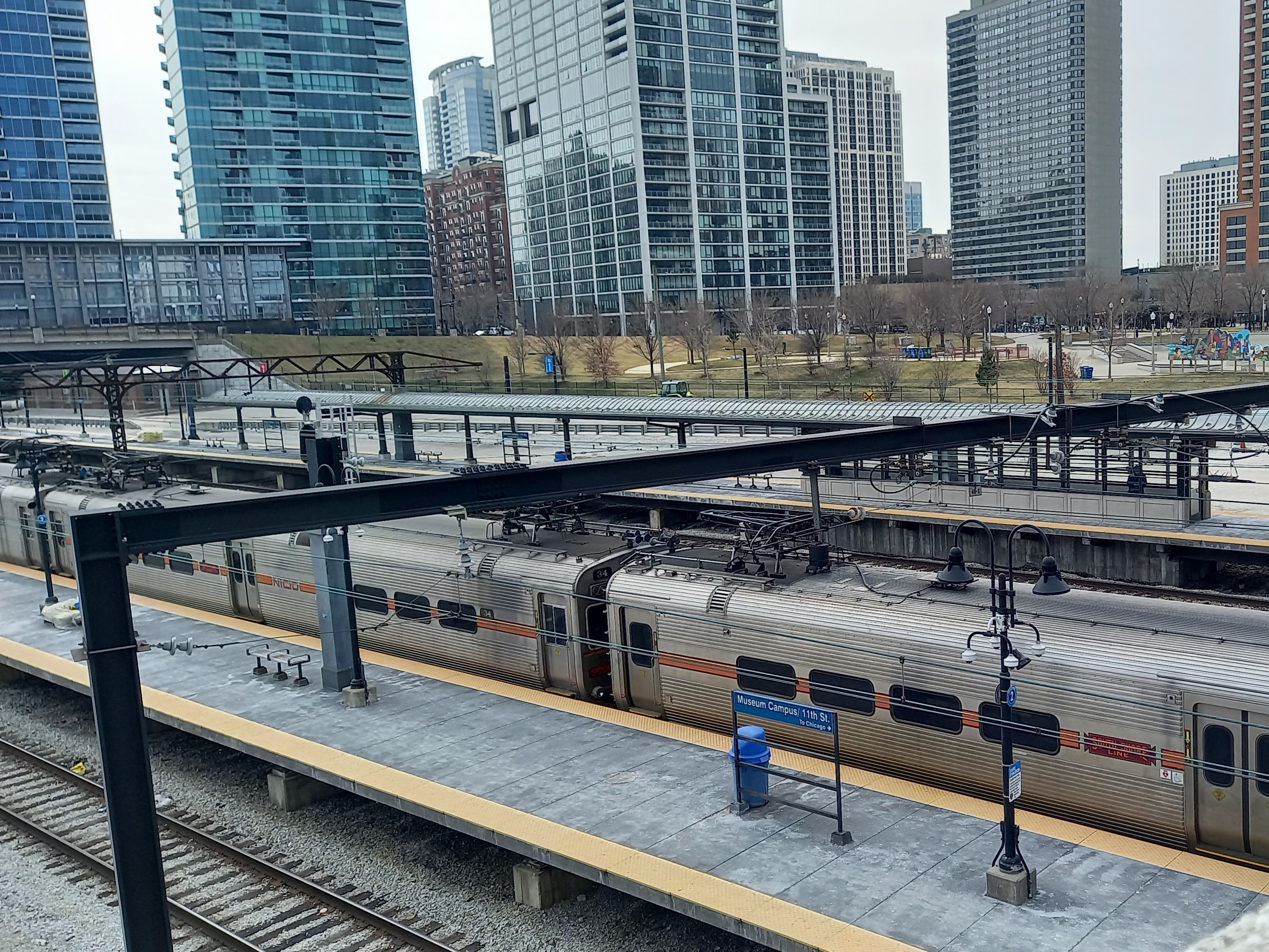
- Inbound South Shore Line train stopping at the station

General information
- Location: Michigan Avenue at 11th Street; Chicago Loop, Chicago, Illinois
- Coordinates: 41.868386°N 87.621192°W
- Owner: Metra
- Line: University Park Sub District
- Platforms: 2 island platforms
- Tracks: 5
- Connections: CTA Buses; Pace Buses

Construction
- Accessible: Yes

Other information
- Fare zone: 1 (Metra and South Shore)

History
- Rebuilt: 2008–2009
- Electrified: 1926
- Former names: Roosevelt Road; 12th Street

Services
Preceding station	Metra	Following station
18th Street toward University Park, South Chicago or Blue Island	Metra Electric	Van Buren Street toward Millennium
Preceding station	NICTD	Following station
57th Street toward South Bend International Airport	Lakeshore Corridor	Van Buren Street toward Millennium Station
57th Street toward Munster/Dyer	Monon Corridor peak hours	Van Buren Street toward Millennium Station
Special events services
Preceding station	NICTD	Following station
18th Street or McCormick Place toward South Bend International Airport	Lakeshore Corridor	Van Buren Street toward Millennium Station
Former services
Preceding station	Illinois Central Railroad	Following station
18th Street toward Richton, 91st Street or Blue Island	Electric Suburban	Van Buren Street toward Randolph Street
Halsted Street toward Addison	West Suburban	Van Buren Street toward Randolph Street
Track layout
Location

Museum Campus/11th Street (formerly Roosevelt Road) is a commuter rail station in downtown Chicago that serves the Metra Electric District north to Millennium Station and south to University Park, Blue Island and South Chicago; and the South Shore Line to Gary and South Bend, Indiana. Most South Shore Line trains stop at the station, and all but one early morning outbound Metra train stop at the station.

== History ==
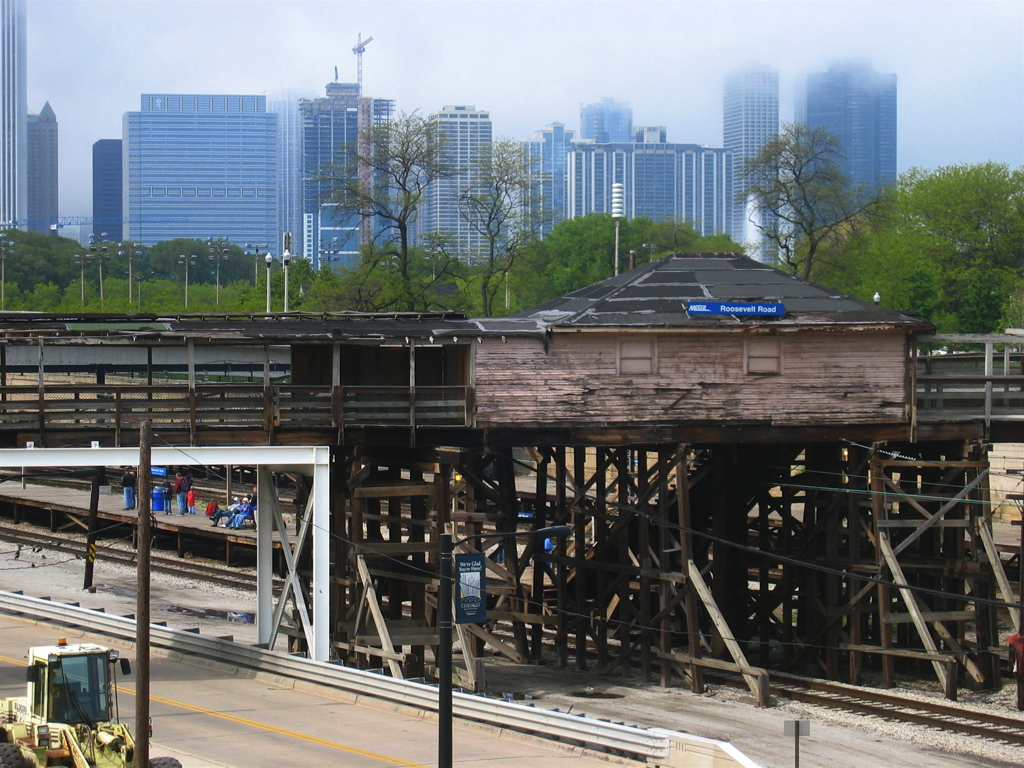
Former Roosevelt Road station

Roosevelt Road station was located where Roosevelt Road intersects the former Illinois Central Railroad line. The station was the former commuter platforms of Central Station, the long-distance IC passenger terminal that was previously located adjacent to this spot. The station structures appeared rickety and run-down, and have since been removed and replaced by a new station located at 11th Street. The station was renamed in 2009 following the rebuilding.

== Bus and rail connections ==
CTA Red Line, CTA Orange and Green Lines

- Roosevelt

CTA Buses

- 1 Bronzeville/Union Station
- 3 King Drive
- 4 Cottage Grove (Owl Service)
- X4 Cottage Grove Express
- 6 Jackson Park Express
- 12 Roosevelt
- 18 16th/18th
- 130 Museum Campus (summer service only)
- 146 Inner Lake Shore/Michigan Express
