= 67th Street station (Illinois) =

Commuter rail station in Chicago, Illinois

67th Street

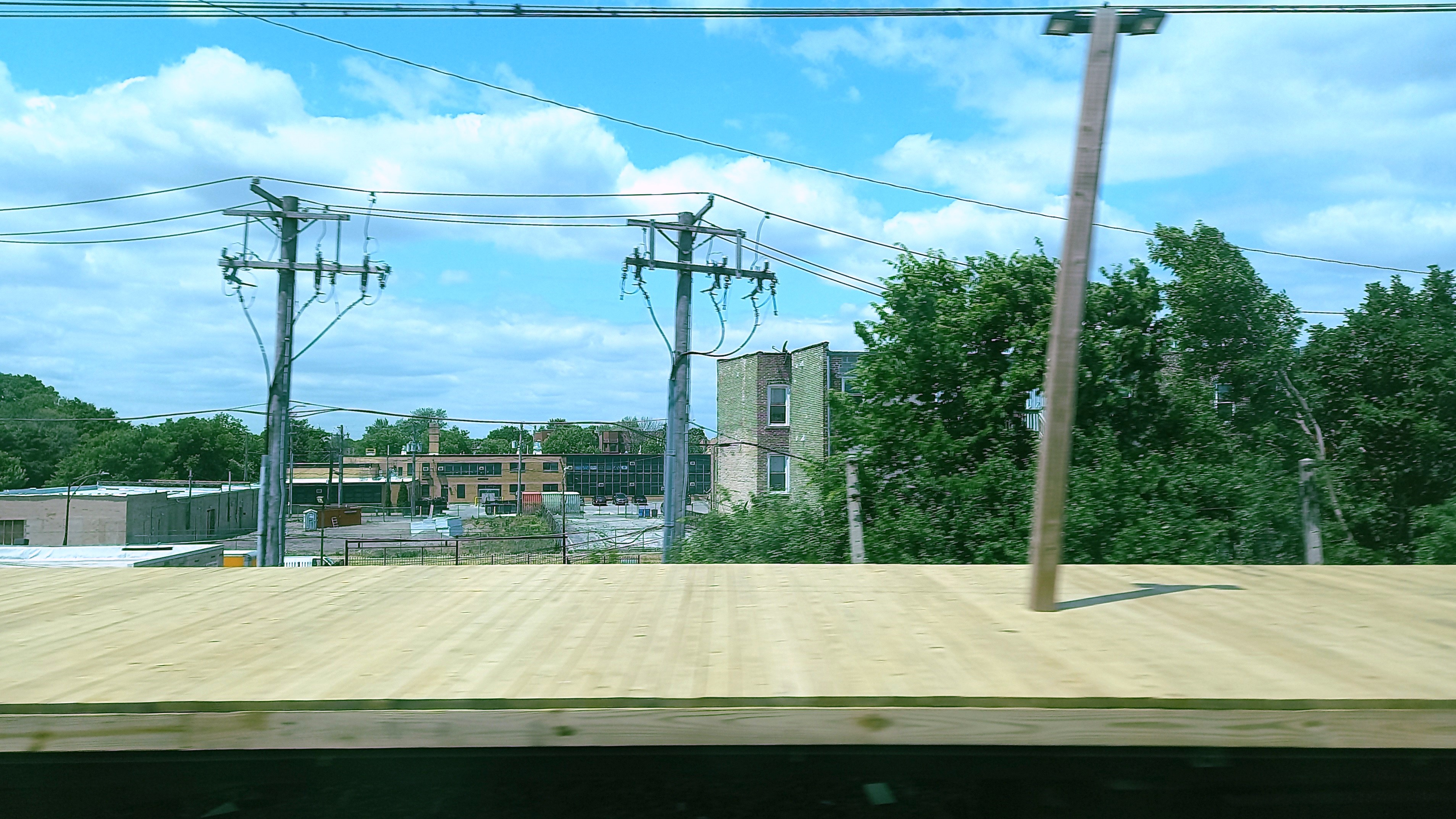
- The now-abandoned 67th Street station in June 2023

General information
- Location: 67th Street & Dorchester Street; Woodlawn, Chicago, Illinois
- Coordinates: 41.77345°N 87.59208°W
- Owner: Metra
- Line: University Park Sub District
- Platforms: 2 island platforms
- Tracks: 4

Other information
- Fare zone: B

History
- Closed: 1984

Former services
Preceding station	Metra	Following station
75th Street (Grand Crossing) toward University Park or Blue Island	Metra Electric Main Line & Blue Island Branch	63rd Street toward Randolph Street
Stony Island toward 91st Street (South Chicago)	Metra Electric South Chicago Branch	63rd Street toward Randolph Street
Preceding station	Illinois Central Railroad	Following station
72nd Street toward Richton or Blue Island	Electric Suburban Main Line & Blue Island Branch	63rd Street toward Randolph Street
Stony Island toward 91st Street	Electric Suburban South Chicago Branch	63rd Street toward Randolph Street
Track layout
Location

67th Street was a commuter rail station on the Metra Electric District in Chicago. The station was built on a solid-fill embankment with a pair of island platforms between the inner and outer tracks. Access was made via a pair of stairwells to street level situated underneath the 67th Street viaduct. The station was closed in 1984 due to low ridership. The stairwells to track level were bricked off, however both platforms still exist.
