= 51st/53rd Street/Hyde Park station =

Commuter rail station in Chicago, Illinois

51st/53rd St./Hyde Park

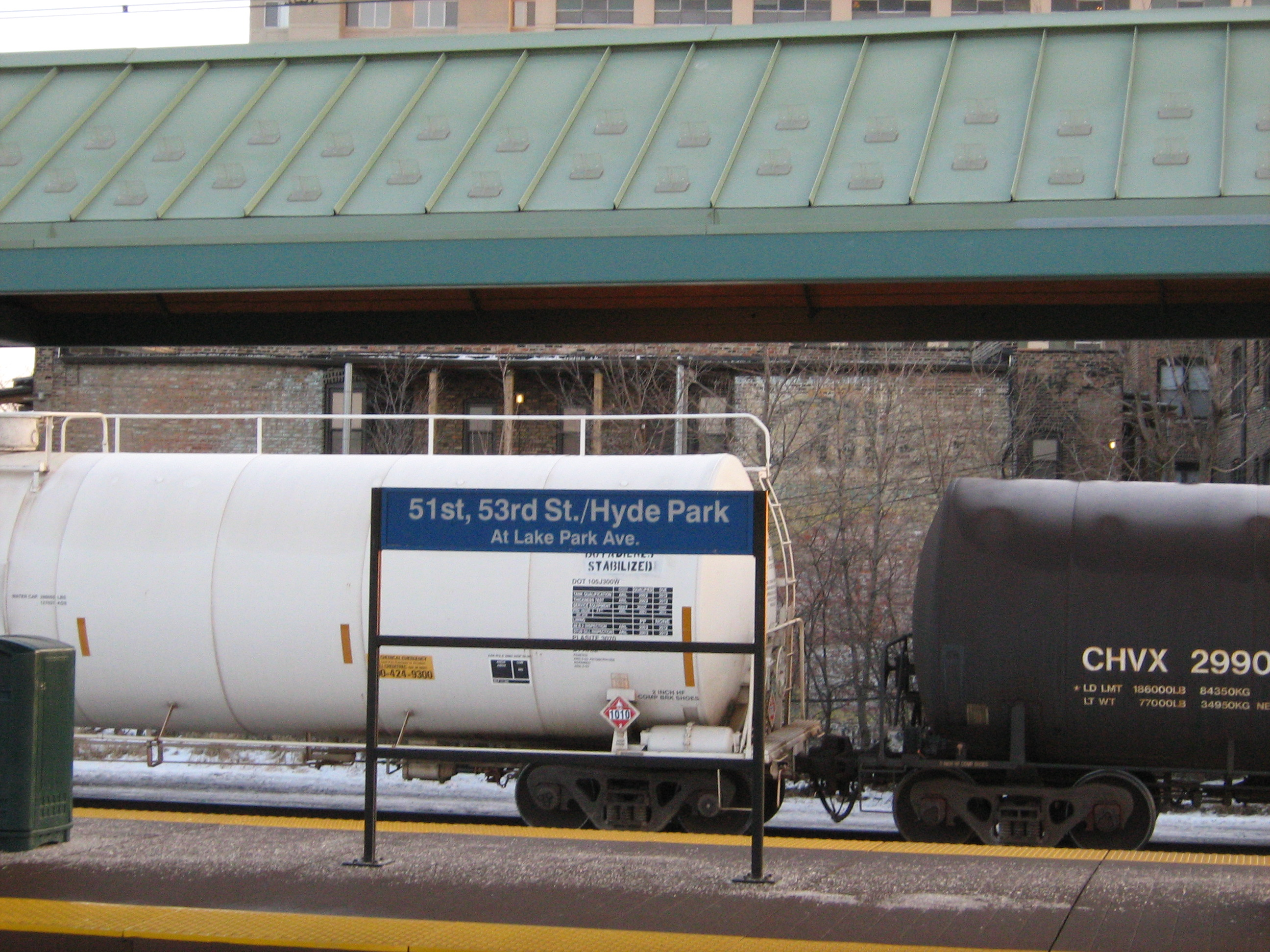
- Hyde Park/51st–53rd Street station

General information
- Location: 52nd Street at Lake Park Avenue; Hyde Park, Chicago, Illinois
- Coordinates: 41.8010°N 87.5872°W
- Owner: Metra
- Line: University Park Sub District
- Platforms: 2 island platforms (formerly 3)
- Tracks: 4
- Connections: CTA Bus

Construction
- Accessible: Yes

Other information
- Fare zone: 2

History
- Opened: 1856
- Rebuilt: 2002
- Electrified: 1926
- Former names: Madison Park

Passengers
- 2018: 671 (average weekday) ▲4.5%
- Rank: 78 out of 236

Services
Preceding station	Metra	Following station
55th/56th/57th Street toward University Park, South Chicago or Blue Island	Metra Electric	47th Street/Kenwood toward Millennium
Former services
Preceding station	Illinois Central Railroad	Following station
55th–56th–57th Streets toward New Orleans	Main Line	43rd Street toward Chicago
91st Street toward Richton, 91st Street or Blue Island	Electric Suburban	47th Street toward Randolph Street
Preceding station	Chicago South Shore and South Bend Railroad	Following station
63rd Street toward South Bend	South Shore Line	McCormick Place toward Randolph Street
Track layout
Location

51st/53rd Street/Hyde Park is a commuter rail station within the City of Chicago serves the Metra Electric District north to Millennium Station and south to University Park, Blue Island, and South Chicago. As of 2018, the station is the 78th busiest of Metra's 236 non-downtown stations, with an average of 671 weekday boardings. The station location, one of the oldest in the United States, has been in continuous use by commuters since 1856.

During peak commute hours, many express trains stop at this station. At off-peak hours, it is served mainly by local trains. Station entrances are located at East Hyde Park Boulevard (5100 S.)/Lake Park Avenue and at 53rd Street/Lake Park Avenue. The station is located near Kenwood Academy High School, the 53rd Street commercial district, and the Regents Park apartment complex.

The East Hyde Park Boulevard (51st Street) viaduct was once the site of a graffiti mural, painted by non-profit youth organization Higher Gliffs with Metra's permission. In September 2006, the murals were whitewashed, possibly by mistake.

The station was served by Illinois Central Railroad intercity-trains from Chicago to points south at an island platform on the two non-electrified tracks east of the electrified tracks. Amtrak's City of New Orleans, Illini, and Saluki still pass by the station without stopping. Prior to October 16, 1966, the South Shore Line also stopped at this station. On that date trains ceased calling at 53rd and instead began stopping at 57th Street, the next station south.

== Bus connections ==
CTA

- 2 Hyde Park Express
- 6 Jackson Park Express
- 15 Jeffery Local
- 28 Stony Island
- 171 University of Chicago/Hyde Park
- 172 University of Chicago/Kenwood

== See also ==
- Paul Cornell
