= Lakeshore Corridor =

Commuter rail line in Illinois and Indiana, US

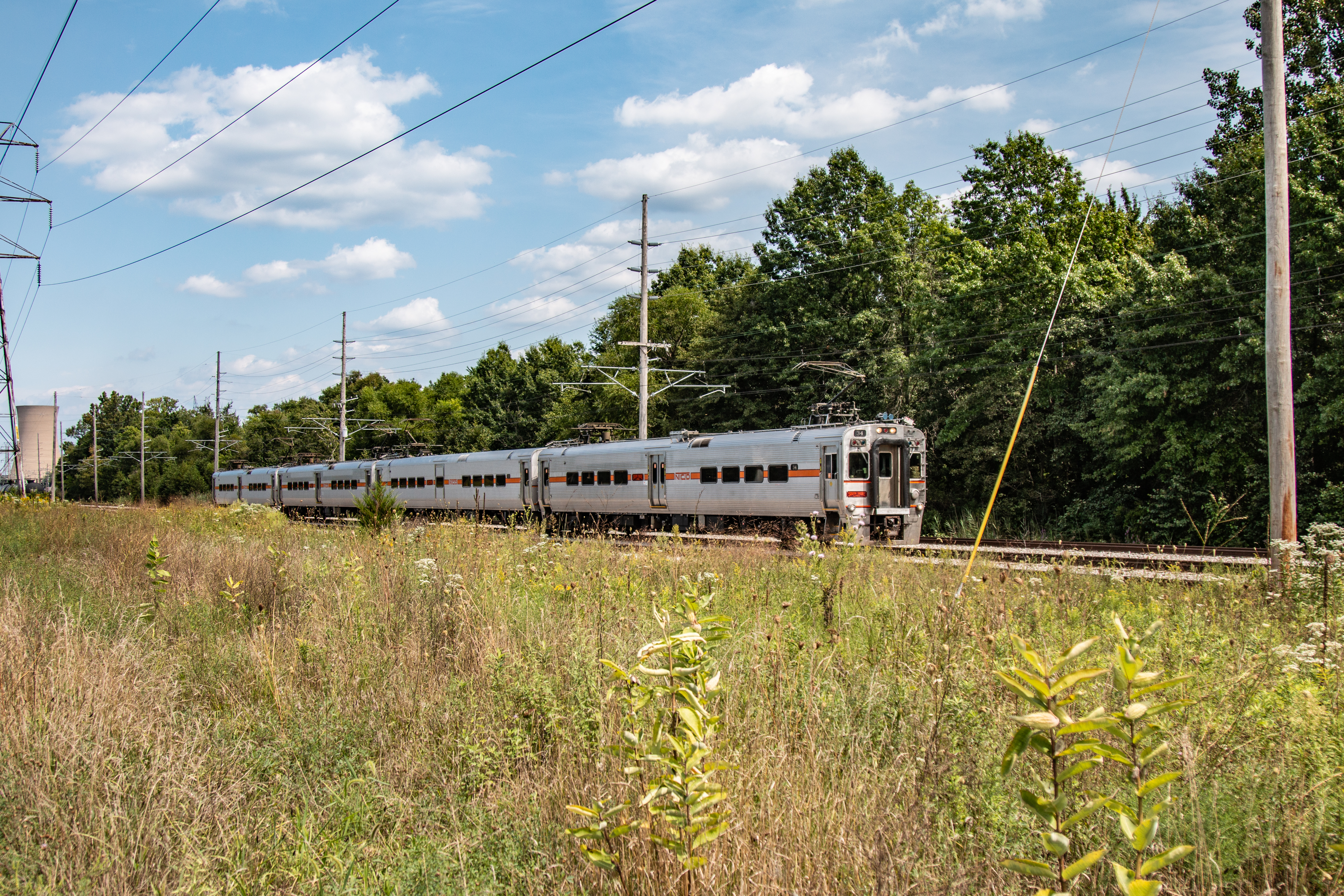
- A Lakeshore Corridor train west of Michigan City, Indiana

Overview
- Locale: Cook County, Illinois, and Northwest Indiana, United States
- Termini: Millennium Station; South Bend International Airport

Service
- Type: Commuter rail
- System: South Shore Line
- Operator: NICTD
- Rolling stock: Nippon Sharyo NICTD EMUs

History
- Opened: 1903; 123 years ago

Technical
- Line length: 90 mi (140 km)
- Number of tracks: 1-2
- Track gauge: 4 ft 8 1/2 in (1,435 mm)
- Electrification: Overhead line, 1,500 V DC
Route map
Key

The Lakeshore Corridor is a commuter rail line in Cook County, Illinois and Northwest Indiana that is part of the South Shore Line system. The line starts at Millennium Station in the Chicago Loop and shares its tracks with the Metra Electric District as they both run south through the South Side. In the neighborhood of Pullman, the line splits from the Metra Electric right of way, where it turns due southeast before reaching the Indiana state line and running east across the northwest part of the state, serving various municipalities along the way such as Hammond, East Chicago, Gary, Michigan City, and South Bend.

What is now branded as the Lakeshore Corridor has historically been the main line of the South Shore Line, dating back to its initial creation in 1903. Following the opening of a brand new branch line in 2026, which was officially branded as the Monon Corridor upon opening, the main line was officially given the retronym, the Lakeshore Corridor.

== Alignment ==
Departing South Bend International Airport, the South Shore Line's Lakeshore Corridor heads south alongside Bendix Drive, then west along Westmoor Street, before connecting with the tracks that ran to its former terminus. Between that point and Hudson Lake, Indiana, the Lakeshore Corridor runs parallel to Norfolk Southern's Chicago Rail Line, also used by Amtrak's Lake Shore Limited and Floridian, on the north side of the tracks. Just before Hudson Lake, the route crosses from St. Joseph County into LaPorte County and enters the Central Time Zone.

From Hudson Lake, the Lakeshore Corridor continues straight west to Michigan City. In Michigan City, the track runs parallel to 11th Street from Michigan Boulevard to Tennessee Street, where it crosses over to Tenth Street. There, the railroad has an at-grade diamond with Amtrak's Michigan Services, after which it runs until Sheridan Avenue on the west side of Michigan City, Leaving Michigan City, the track travels through Indiana Dunes State Park, crosses over the Chicago Line and runs parallel to it, this time on the south side, past Long Lake. At Gary, Indiana, the route heads west to service the Gary Airport, at times running parallel to the Indiana Toll Road, as far as Hammond, Indiana.

Just west of Hammond Gateway, the Lakeshore Corridor crosses into Illinois and Chicago city limits, at which point the track curves northwest, through the Hegewisch neighborhood and, after crossing the Bishop Ford Freeway and the Calumet River, converges with the Metra Electric District at a junction south of 115th Street/Kensington station. The Lakeshore Corridor then runs over the Metra Electric Line the rest of the way to Millennium Station.

The Lakeshore Corridor is quadruple tracked along the section shared with the Metra Electric line from Millennium Station to 115th Street/Kensington, double-tracked from Kensington to Michigan City, and single-tracked from there to South Bend International Airport.

== Station listing ==
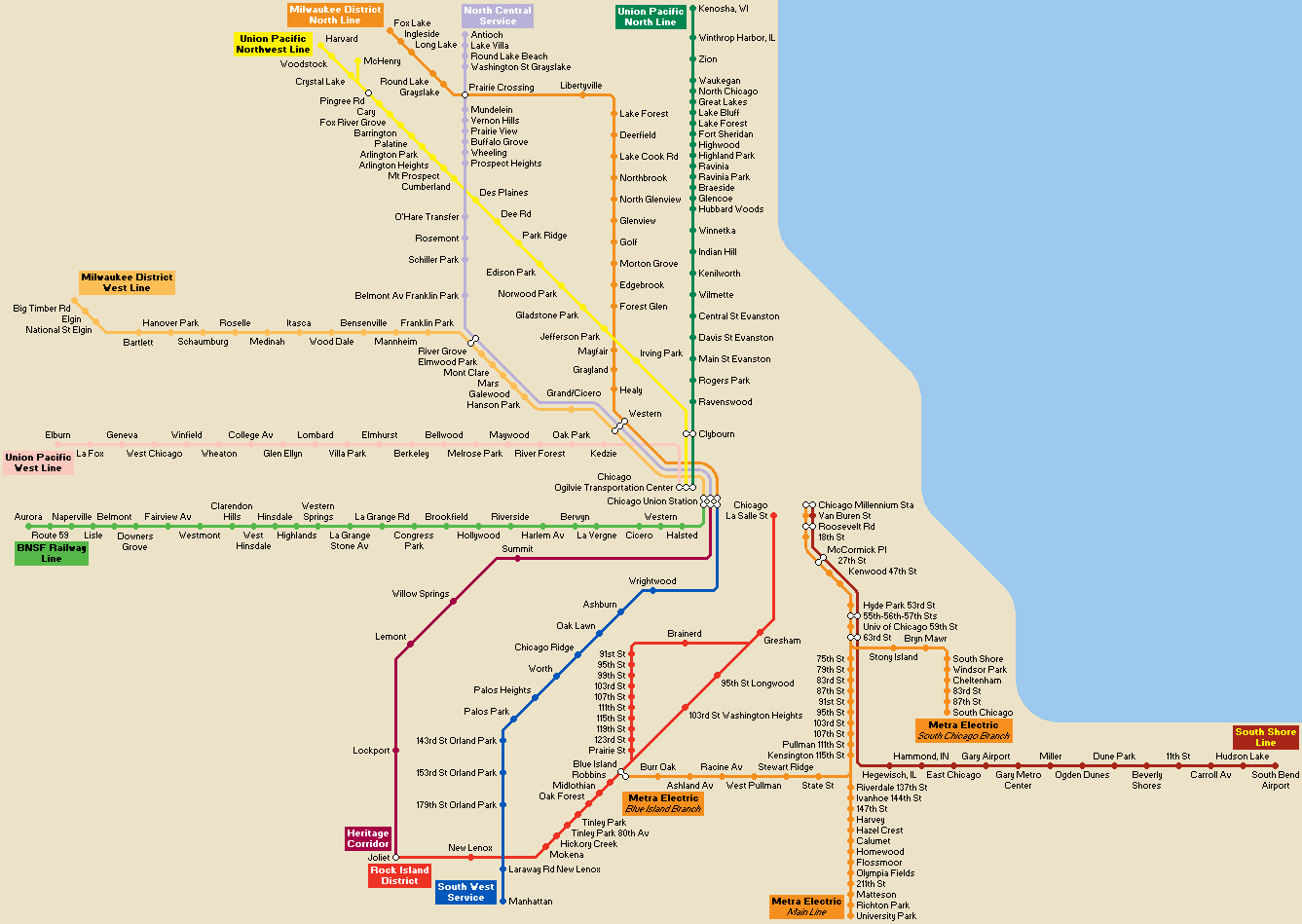
The South Shore Line and the Metra system as of 2012

The line operates over the tracks of the Metra Electric Line from Millennium Station to Kensington-115th Street. Metra owns the track in this territory. Per a long-standing non-compete clause with Metra and its predecessor, the Illinois Central Railroad, outbound South Shore Line trains to Indiana only stop at Metra Electric stations to receive passengers; inbound trains to Millennium Station only stop at Metra Electric stations to discharge passengers. This non-compete clause will cease to exist when Illinois' NITA Act comes into effect in late 2026, allowing passengers to use South Shore Line trains to travel to and from stations shared with Metra.

South Shore Line trains make the following station stops:

Fare zone	Location	Station	Mile (km)	Avg. weekday ridership (2019)	Connections and notes
1	Chicago, IL	Millennium Station	0	4,227	Metra: Metra Electric; Chicago "L": Red (at Lake), Green Brown Orange Pink Purple (at Washington/Wabash); CTA buses: 4 X4 6 19 20 26 60 N66 124 143 147 148 151 157; Pace: 855; VALPOtransit: ChicaGo Dash
1	Chicago, IL	Van Buren Street	0.8 (1.3)	977	Metra: Metra Electric; CTA buses: 1 3 4 X4 6 7 J14 26 28 126 130 147 148 151
1	Chicago, IL	Museum Campus/11th Street	1.4 (2.3)	166	Metra: Metra Electric; CTA buses: 1 3 4 X4 12 130 146
1	Chicago, IL	McCormick Place (special events only)	2.7 (4.3)	0	Metra: Metra Electric; CTA buses: 3 21
	Chicago, IL	53rd Street	6.5 (10.5)		South Shore service withdrawn October 16, 1966, replaced by 57th Street
2	Chicago, IL	57th Street	7.0 (11.3)	271	Metra: Metra Electric; CTA buses: 15 28 55 171
2	Chicago, IL	59th Street			South Shore service began by 1985, replacing 57th Street. South Shore service withdrawn by 2009.
2	Chicago, IL	63rd Street	7.9 (12.7)	3	Metra: Metra Electric; CTA buses: 63
2	Chicago, IL	115th Street/Kensington	14.5 (23.3)		South Shore service withdrawn February 15, 2012
	Chicago, IL	124th Street	16 (26)		Closed by 1965.
	Chicago, IL	Parsons	16 (26)		Closed by 1956.
	Chicago, IL	Altgeld	16 (26)		Opened by 1948, closed by 1961.
	Chicago, IL	Calumet Harbor	17 (27)		Named Bridge prior to 1943; closed by 1985.
	Chicago, IL	Ford City	17 (27)		Closed by 1959.
3	Chicago, IL	Hegewisch	19.0 (30.6)	862	CTA buses: 30; Pace: 358, 364
	Burnham, IL	Burnham	19 (31)		Closed by 1959.
4	Hammond	Hammond Gateway	20.8 (33.5)	1,345	South Shore Line: Monon Corridor; GPTC: R6
4	East Chicago	White Oak Ave	22 (35)		Opened by 1941, closed by 1957.
4	East Chicago	East Chicago	23.4 (37.7)	1,493	East Chicago Transit: E1, E2, E3; GPTC: R1
	East Chicago	Calumet	24 (39)		Closed by 1959.
	Hammond	Cudahy	25 (40)		Closed by 1959.
5	Gary	Gary/Chicago Airport	28.0 (45.1)	80	GPTC: R1; Originally named Clark Road.
5	Gary	Ambridge	29.2 (47.0)		Closed July 5, 1994
5	Gary	Buchanan Street	30 (48)		Closed by 1985.
5	Gary	Gary Metro Center	30.9 (49.7)	426	GPTC: R1, R3, BMX, L1, L2, L3, L5
5	Gary	Miller	34.7 (55.8)	339	GPTC: L2
6	Ogden Dunes	Portage/Ogden Dunes	38.9 (62.6)	237	
6	Portage	Midwest	40 (64)		Named Wilson prior to 1961; closed by 1985.
6	Burns Harbor	Bailly	43 (69)		Named Baileytown prior to 1965; closed by 1985.
6	Dune Acres	Dune Acres	44.7 (71.9)		Closed 1994.
6	Porter	Port Chester	46 (74)		Closed by 1985.
6	Porter	Dune Park	46.0 (74.0)	474	
	Tremont	Tremont	47.0 (75.6)		Closed June 2, 1986, replaced with Dune Park
	Indiana Dunes	Mt. Vernon	50 (80)		Closed by 1948.
7	Indiana Dunes	Kemil Road			Opened by 1985; closed July 5, 1994.
7	Beverly Shores	Beverly Shores	50.4 (81.1)	47	
	Pines	Pines	52 (84)		Named Tamarack prior to 1963; closed by 1985.
	Michigan City	Lake Shore	54 (87)		Closed by 1963.
8	Michigan City	Willard Avenue			Opened by 1985; closed July 5, 1994.
8	Michigan City	11th Street	55.8 (89.8)	102	Michigan City Transit: 1, 2, 3
8	Michigan City	Carroll Avenue	57.5 (92.5)	172	Michigan City Transit: 3
	Springfield	Springville	62 (100)		Closed by 1985.
9	Hesston	LaLumiere (Note: Spelling varied during the station's lifetime, also being listed in timetables as Lalumiere and Lalumier.)	65 (105)		Closed July 5, 1994.
	Hesston	Tee Lake	67 (108)		Closed by 1985.
	Hesston	Smith	68 (109)		Closed by 1985.
	LaPorte	Hillside	70 (110)		Closed by 1942.
10	Rolling Prairie	Rolling Prairie	71 (114.2)		Named Birchim prior to 1963; closed July 5, 1994.
10	Rolling Prairie	Liberty Bell	72 (116)		Closed by 1941.
10	Rolling Prairie	Sagunay	73 (117)		Closed by 1948.
10	Rolling Prairie	Lake Park	74 (119)		Closed by 1985.
10	Hudson Lake	Hudson Lake	74.6 (120.1)	1	
10	New Carlisle	New Carlisle	76.3 (122.8)		Closed July 5, 1994, planned to reopen by 2027
	Olive	Olive	79 (127)		Closed by 1948.
	Lydick	Lydick	83 (134)		Closed by 1985.
	Lydick	Chain O'Lakes	84 (135)		Closed by 1985.
	Ardmore	Fisher	85 (137)		Closed by 1941.
	South Bend	Bendix Drive	88 (142)		Closed by 1970.
11	South Bend	South Bend Airport	90.1 (145.0)	227	Transpo: 4; Greyhound Lines; Coach USA
11	South Bend	South Bend			Current Amtrak station; South Shore service withdrawn November 21, 1992
	South Bend	South Bend			Closed 1970; located in downtown South Bend

== Service patterns ==
The most recent schedule revision took effect on March 31, 2026, with the opening of the Monon Corridor.

=== Weekday schedule ===
In the westbound direction, 26 trains terminate at Millennium Station. Six of these trips run the whole length of the line from South Bend International Airport, while all other trips originate at other stops in Michigan City and Gary (8 trains from Carroll Avenue, 5 trains from 11th Street, and 7 trains from Miller). Some trips are "express" and do not make certain station stops; while mainly concentrated in the morning peak, some trips in the afternoon are also express.

In the eastbound direction, 27 trains originate at Millennium Station. Six trains continue all the way to South Bend International Airport, while 6 trains terminate at Miller and the remainder terminate at either Carroll Avenue or 11th Street.

In addition to service at Millennium Station, there are three trains that run only between Carroll Avenue and South Bend International Airport, with eastbound service in the early morning and westbound service in the late evening.

=== Weekend and holiday schedule ===
On weekends and holidays, there are ten trains to and from Millennium Station. In the westbound direction, four trains originate at Carroll Avenue while all others originate at South Bend International Airport; however, in the eastbound direction, all but two trains terminate at South Bend International Airport.

Three early morning shuttle trains run between Carroll Avenue and South Bend International Airport in the eastbound direction. There are no westbound South Bend-Carroll Ave shuttles on weekends.

Occasionally, McCormick Place and 18th Street are served as flag stops for special events at McCormick Place convention center and Soldier Field.

== See also ==
- Chicago South Shore and South Bend Railroad
- South Shore Line Airport Realignment
