= 115th Street/Kensington station =

Commuter rail station in Chicago, Illinois

115th Street/Kensington

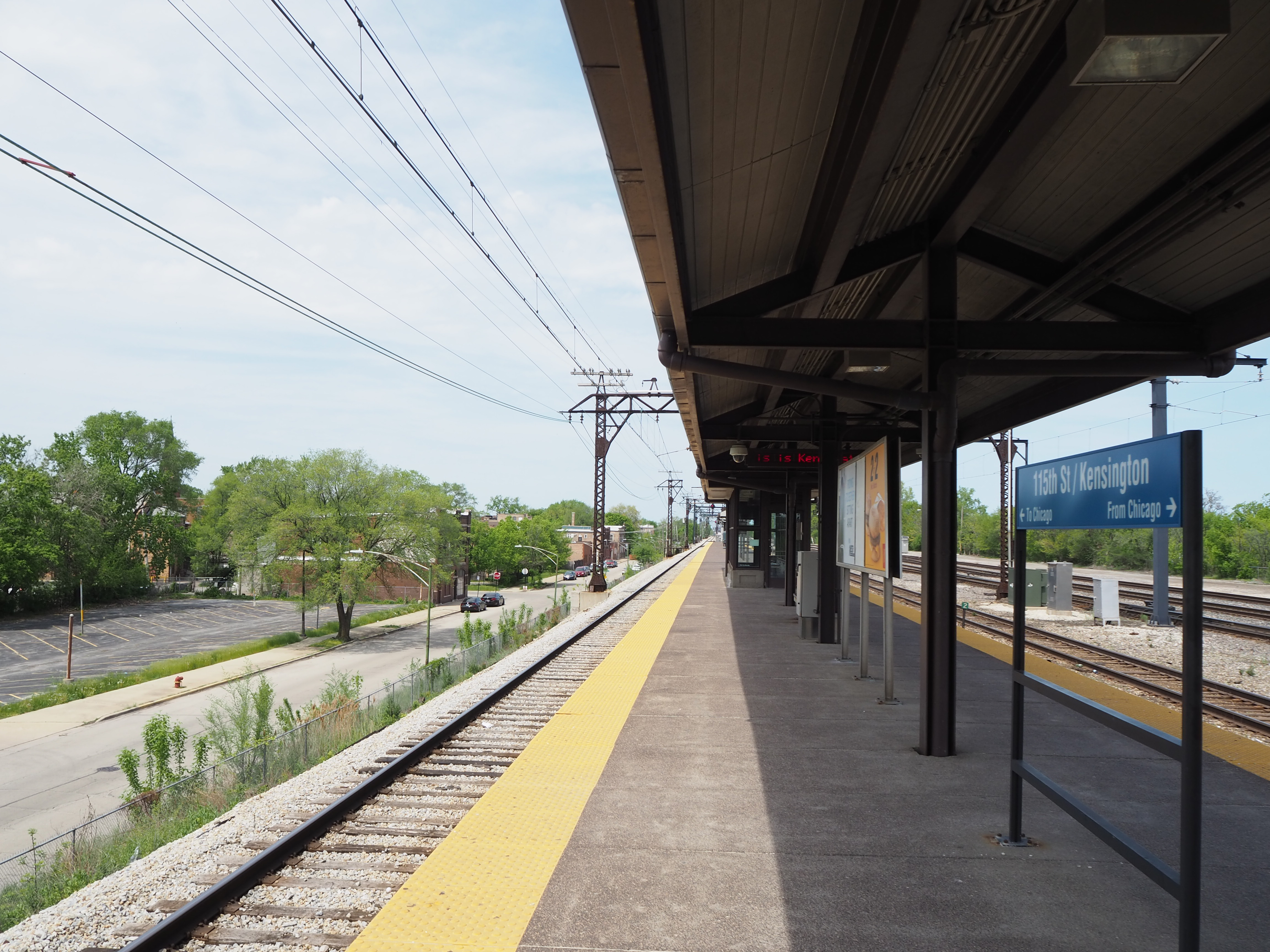
- 115th Street/Kensington station in May 2022.

General information
- Location: 115th Street and Cottage Grove Avenue; Pullman, Chicago, Illinois
- Coordinates: 41.686462°N 87.612027°W
- Owner: Metra
- Line: University Park Sub District
- Platforms: 1 Island platform (formerly 2)
- Tracks: 3
- Connections: CTA Bus

Construction
- Parking: Yes
- Accessible: Yes

Other information
- Fare zone: 2

History
- Opened: 1916
- Electrified: 1926

Passengers
- 2018: 1,136 (average weekday) ▲1.4%
- Rank: 37 out of 236

Services
Preceding station	Metra	Following station
Riverdale toward University Park	Metra Electric Main Line	111th Street/Pullman toward Millennium
State Street toward Blue Island	Metra Electric Blue Island Branch	111th Street/Pullman toward Millennium
Former services
Preceding station	NICTD	Following station
63rd Street toward Millennium Station	South Shore Line pre-2012	Hegewisch toward South Bend
Preceding station	Illinois Central Railroad	Following station
Harvey toward New Orleans	Main Line	63rd Street toward Chicago
130th Street (Wildwood) toward Richton	Electric Suburban Main Line	111th Street toward Randolph Street
State Street–Rose Lawn toward Blue Island	Electric Suburban Blue Island Branch	111th Street toward Randolph Street
Preceding station	New York Central Railroad	Following station
Hammond toward Detroit	Michigan Central Railroad Main Line	63rd Street toward Chicago
Harvey toward Cincinnati	Chicago – Cincinnati	63rd Street toward Chicago
Track layout
Location

115th Street/Kensington is a commuter rail station on the far south side of Chicago that serves the Metra Electric District north to Millennium Station and south to University Park and Blue Island. The station is located at 115th Street and Cottage Grove Avenue in the Pullman & West Pullman neighborhoods. It is the last station for Blue Island Branch trains before those split off of the main line for Blue Island. As of 2018, the station is the 37th busiest of Metra's 236 non-downtown stations, with an average of 1,136 weekday boardings. The South Shore Line diverges to Indiana immediately south of this station. It had previously stopped at this station prior to February 15, 2012, with the reconfiguration of the junction to minimize congestion.

In 1991, an advocacy group formed to press Metra to make necessary cosmetic and safety upgrades to this station, one of the busiest on the Metra Electric District. Dubbed "Operation Restore Kensington," the group pressured railroad officials to work closely with the city to upgrade parking, enhance station lighting, landscaping and security, and persuade local vendors to open concession stands in the station. For its efforts, O.R.K. monitored the railroad's efforts to build a brand new station and assisted with the railroad's efforts to increase station parking facilities. O.R.K. was disbanded in the 1990s.

The station was also served by Illinois Central intercity-trains from Chicago to points south.

A station typology adopted by the Chicago Plan Commission on October 16, 2014, assigns the 115th Street/Kensington station a typology of Local Activity Center. A Local Activity Center typology is primarily characterized by the Metra station being the central focus of a built-up and identifiable neighborhood.

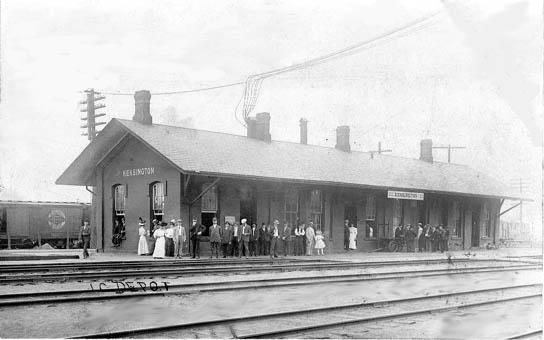
Photo of the original Kensington station

== Bus connections ==
CTA

- 4 Cottage Grove
- 111A Pullman Shuttle
- 115 Pullman/115th

Improvements:

- Newly paved parking area as of 2020.
- Improvement projects near Cottage Grove Avenue which is connected to the Pullman neighborhood improvements.

== See also ==
- Kensington, Chicago
