= Van Buren Street station =

Commuter rail station in Chicago, Illinois

Van Buren Street

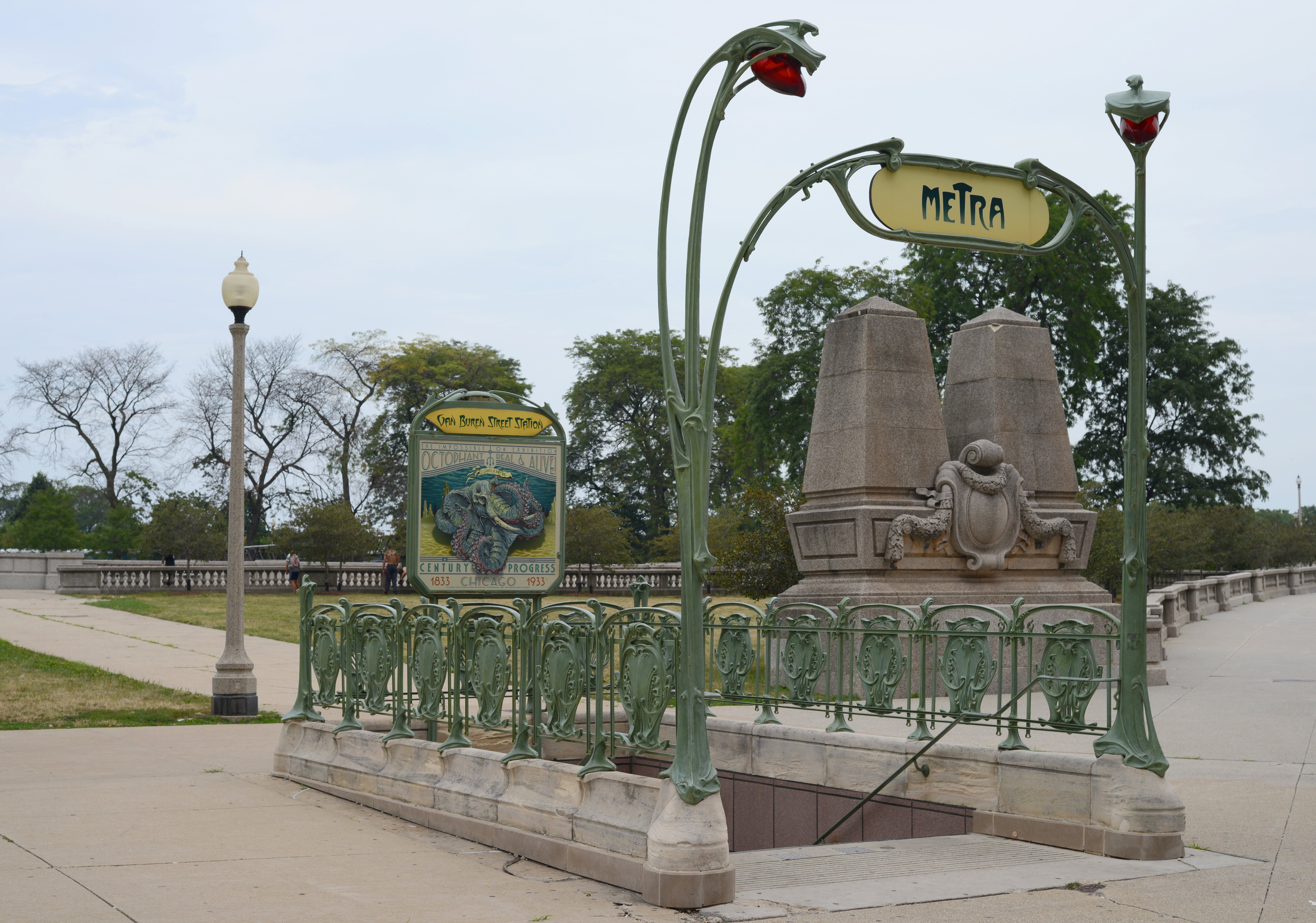
- Hector Guimard-inspired entrance located close to Grant Park

General information
- Location: 132 East Van Buren Street; Chicago Loop, Chicago, Illinois 60604
- Coordinates: (400 S/100 E); 41.877326°N 87.622844°W
- Owner: Metra
- Line: University Park Sub District
- Platforms: 1 side platform, 1 island platform
- Tracks: 4
- Connections: CTA Bus; Pace Buses

Construction
- Accessible: Yes

Other information
- Fare zone: 1 (Metra and South Shore)

History
- Rebuilt: 1896
- Electrified: 1926

Passengers
- 10,000 daily (Metra)

Services
Preceding station	Metra	Following station
Museum Campus/11th Street toward University Park, South Chicago or Blue Island	Metra Electric	Millennium Terminus
Preceding station	NICTD	Following station
Museum Campus/11th Street toward South Bend Airport	Lakeshore Corridor	Millennium Station Terminus
Museum Campus/11th Street toward Munster/Dyer	Monon Corridor peak hours	Millennium Station Terminus
Former services
Preceding station	Illinois Central Railroad	Following station
Roosevelt Road toward Richton, 91st Street or Blue Island	Electric Suburban	Randolph Street Terminus
Roosevelt Road toward Addison	West Suburban	Randolph Street Terminus
Track layout
Location

Van Buren Street station is a commuter rail station in downtown Chicago that serves the Metra Electric District to University Park, Blue Island, and South Chicago neighborhood; and the South Shore Line to Gary and South Bend, Indiana.

The station has three tracks, with one side and one island platform. One of the station's entrances is a replica of an Hector Guimard-designed, Art Nouveau-style Paris Métro entrance. The entrance was given to Chicago as a gift by the city of Paris in 2001.

A refurbishment project will begin in the near future, with the station receiving new entrances and a green roof. As part of this renovation, the Guimard replica station entrance will be removed and relocated to a new location to be determined by the City of Chicago. The South Shore Line is conducting a separate project to add a third platform to the station to allow for increased service.

== Bus connections ==
CTA Buses

- 1 Bronzeville/Union Station
- 3 King Drive
- 4 Cottage Grove (Owl Service)
- X4 Cottage Grove Express
- 6 Jackson Park Express
- 7 Harrison
- J14 Jeffery Jump
- 26 South Shore Express
- 126 Jackson
- 130 Museum Campus (Summer Service Only)
- 147 Outer DuSable Lake Shore Express
- 148 Clarendon/Michigan Express
- 151 Sheridan

== Gallery ==
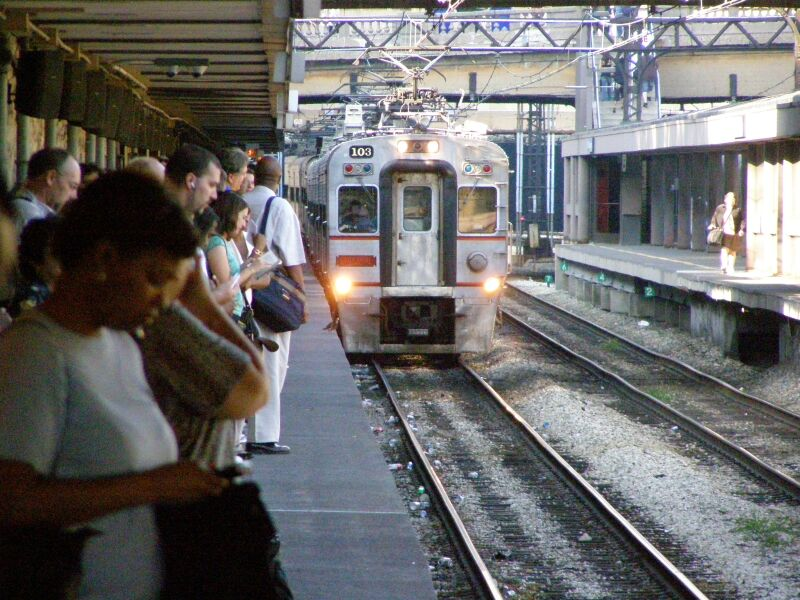
South Shore train approaching from Millennium Station

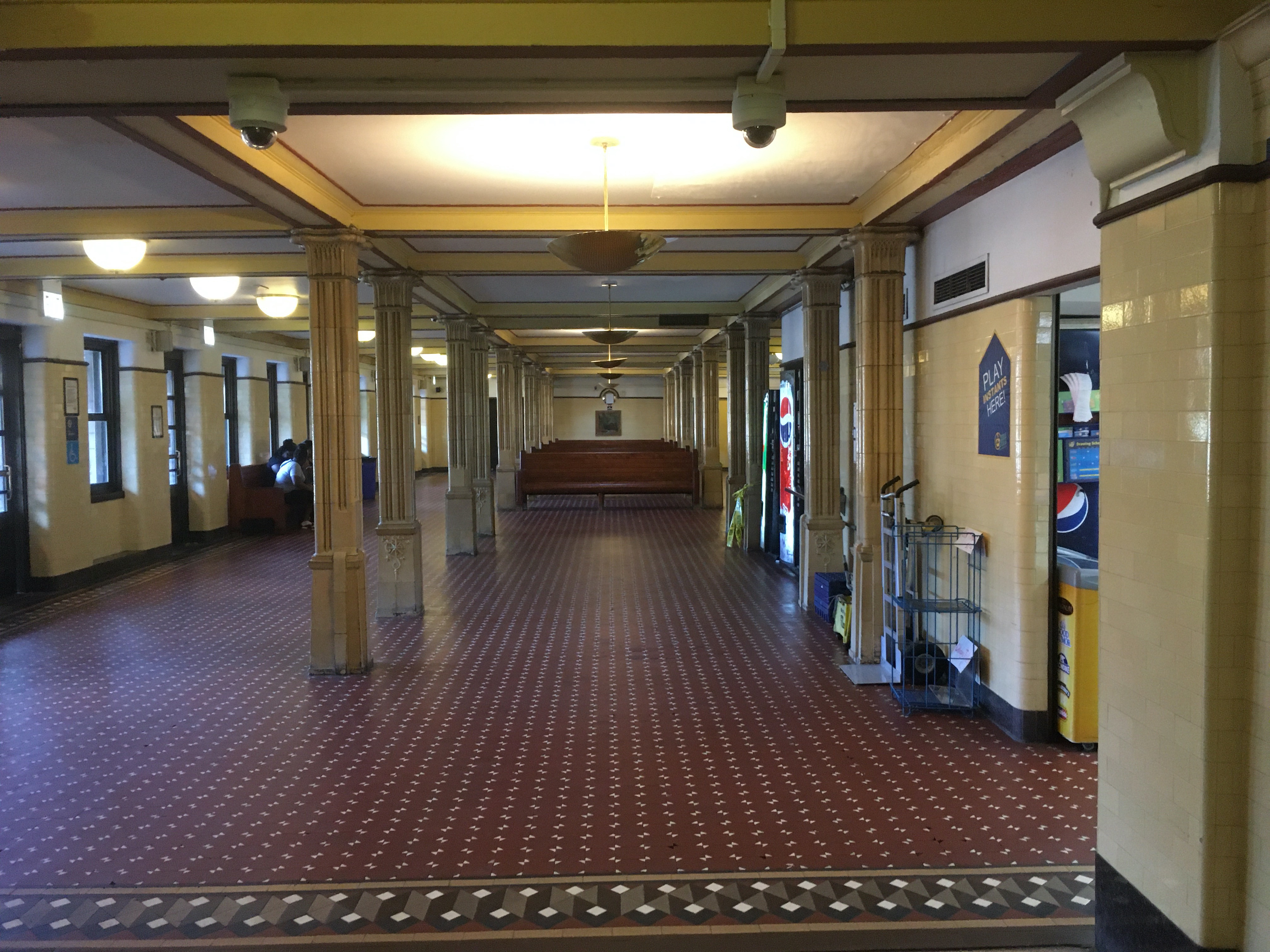
Interior of the Van Buren Street station

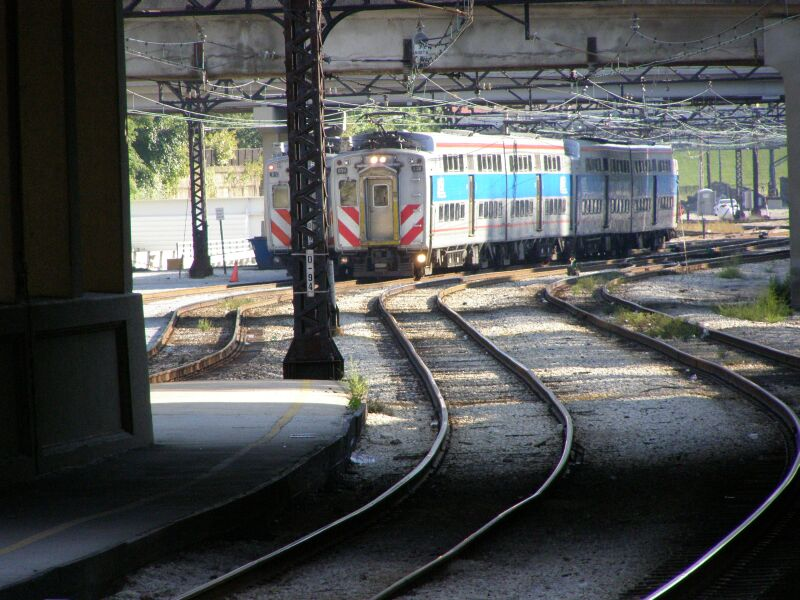
A Metra train approaching from Kensington and points south

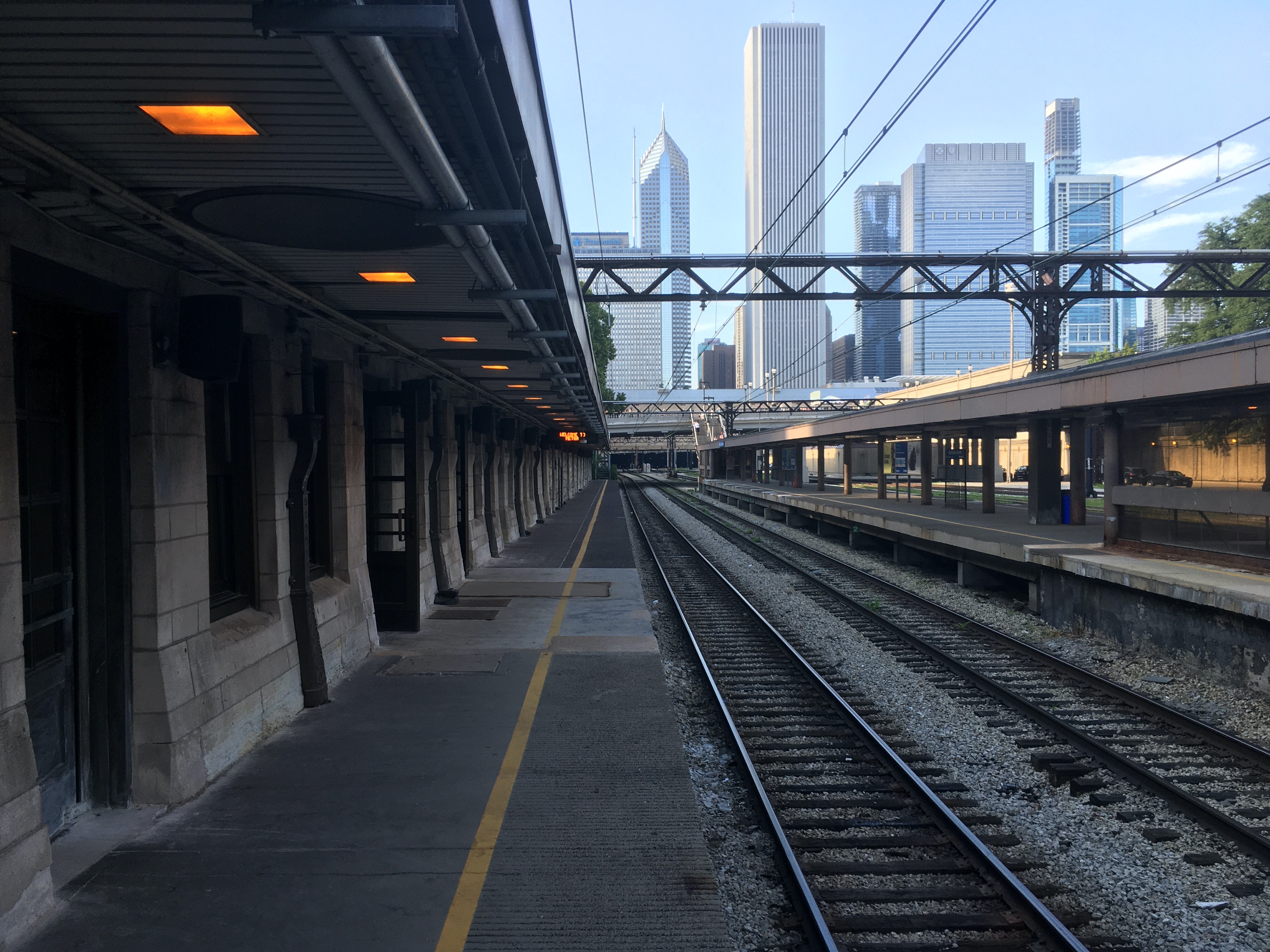
The downtown Chicago skyline as seen from Van Buren Street station in July 2019

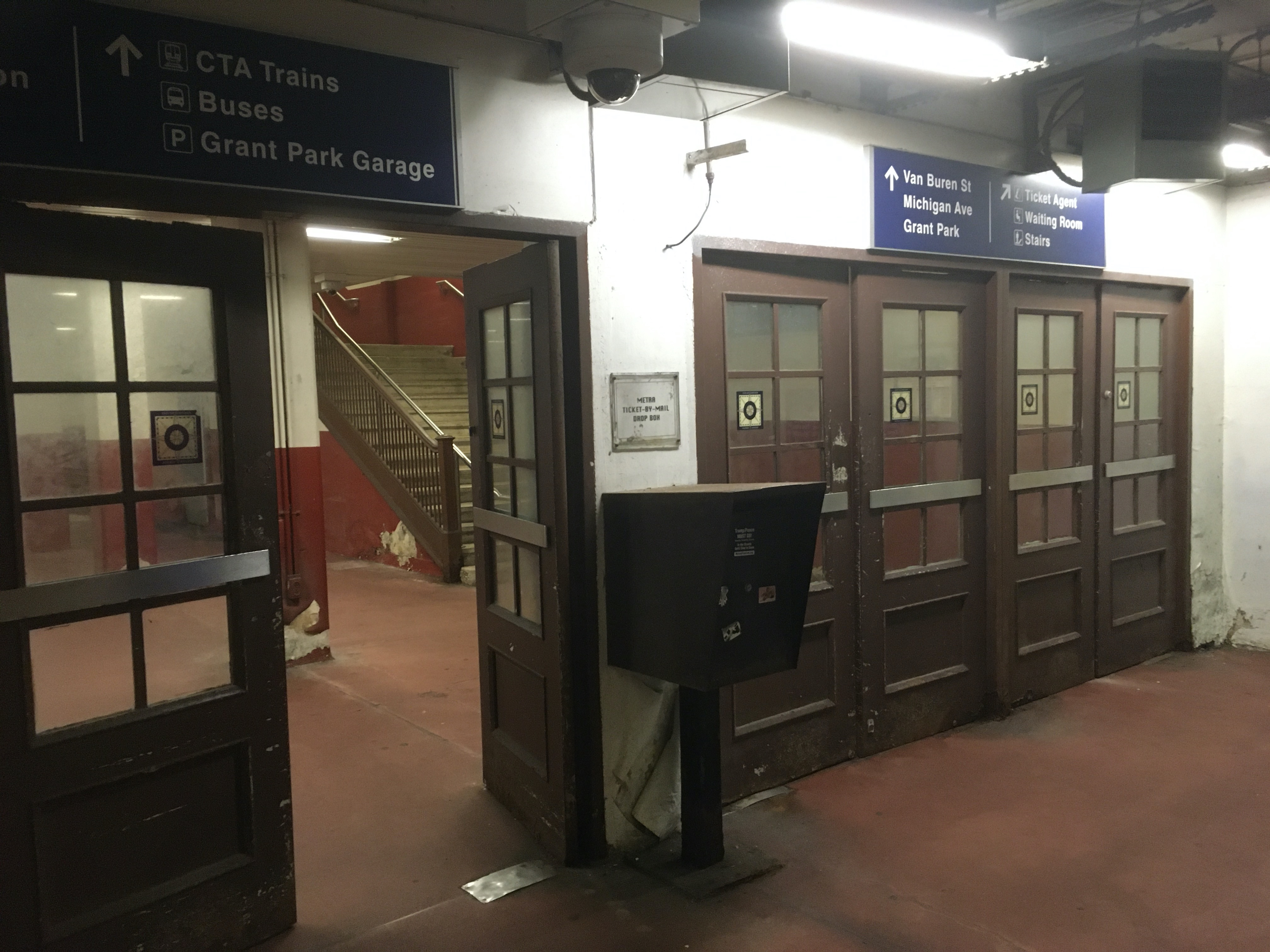
Signs direct people to various transit options and the Chicago Pedway

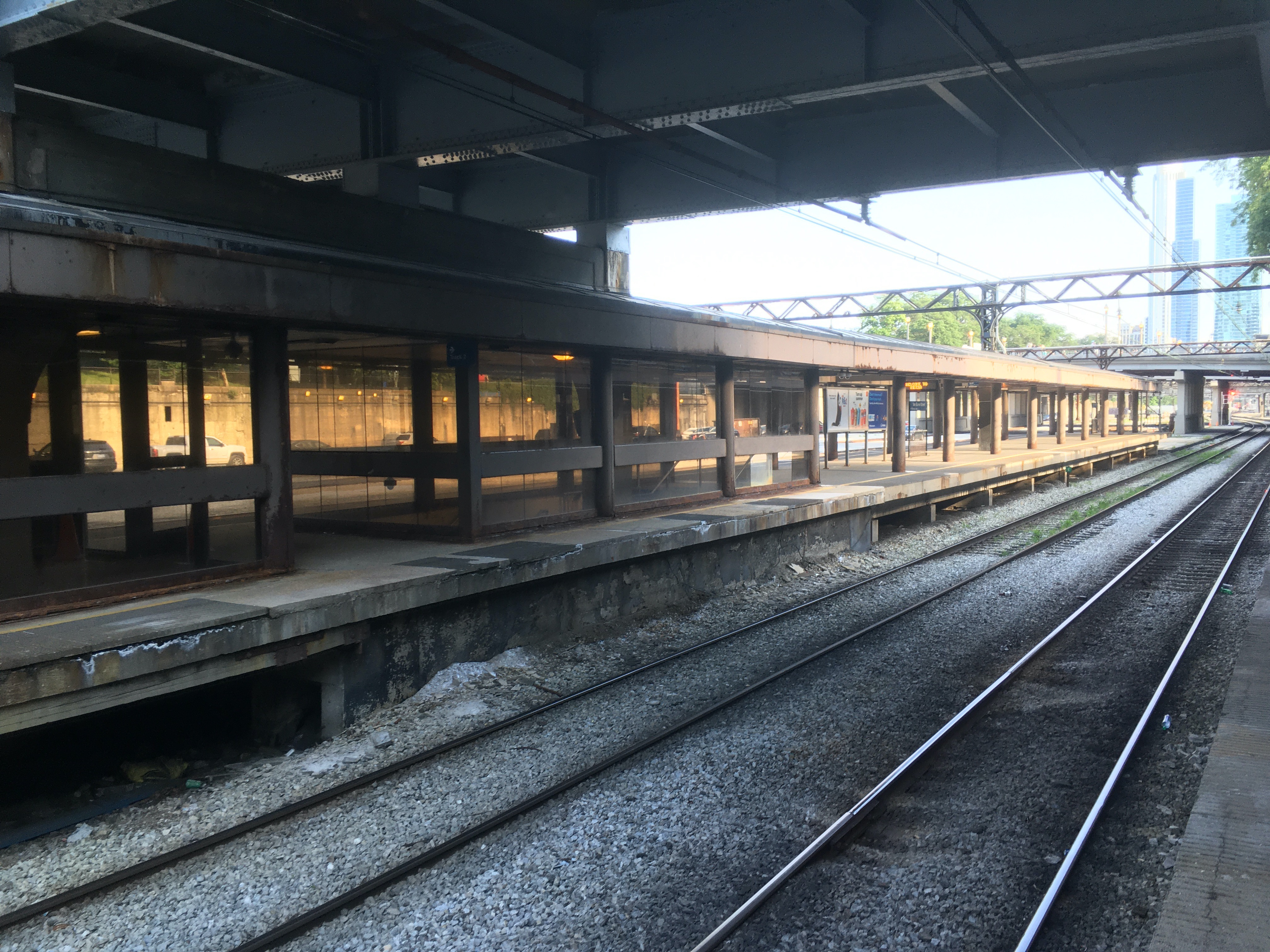
The other side of the station
