= Kensington, Chicago =

Neighborhood in Chicago

Coordinates: 41°40′41″N 87°36′26″W

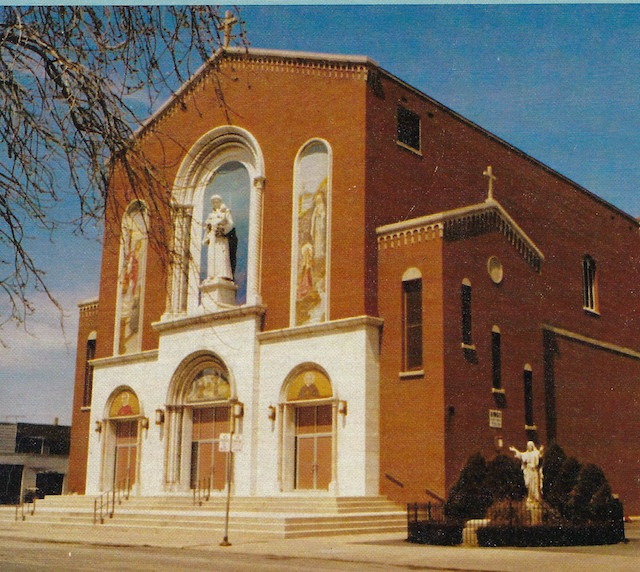
St. Anthony Catholic Church was built by the Italians of Kensington in 1913 as their parish church. It is still open today.

Kensington is a neighborhood in the Far South Side of Chicago. Founded as the town of Calumet Junction in 1852, it began as a small community of rail-workers servicing the junction of the Illinois Central and Michigan Central railroads. It was nicknamed "Bumtown" by neighbors, though the origin is unclear. When the Pullman Sleeping Car Company established itself nearby, Kensington swelled with workers that could not or would not live in the Pullman company town. The commercial district around Kensington station boomed as Pullman residents escaped the company run stores: the saloons along Front Avenue found particular success in serving the dry town's denizens. The 1894 Pullman strike was headquartered in a Kensington clubhouse. As the Far South Side developed and immigrants came seeking work, Italians moved into Kensington. They were soon the majority, and the neighborhood remained a vibrant Italian enclave until the 1970s. Today, Kensington is a Hispanic enclave centered around a smaller commercial district, and the Front Avenue saloons are gone.

== See also ==
- West Pullman, Chicago
- Kensington/115th Street station
- Pullman, Chicago
- Roseland, Chicago
