= South Bend station (South Shore Line) =

Commuter rail station in South Bend, Indiana

South Bend
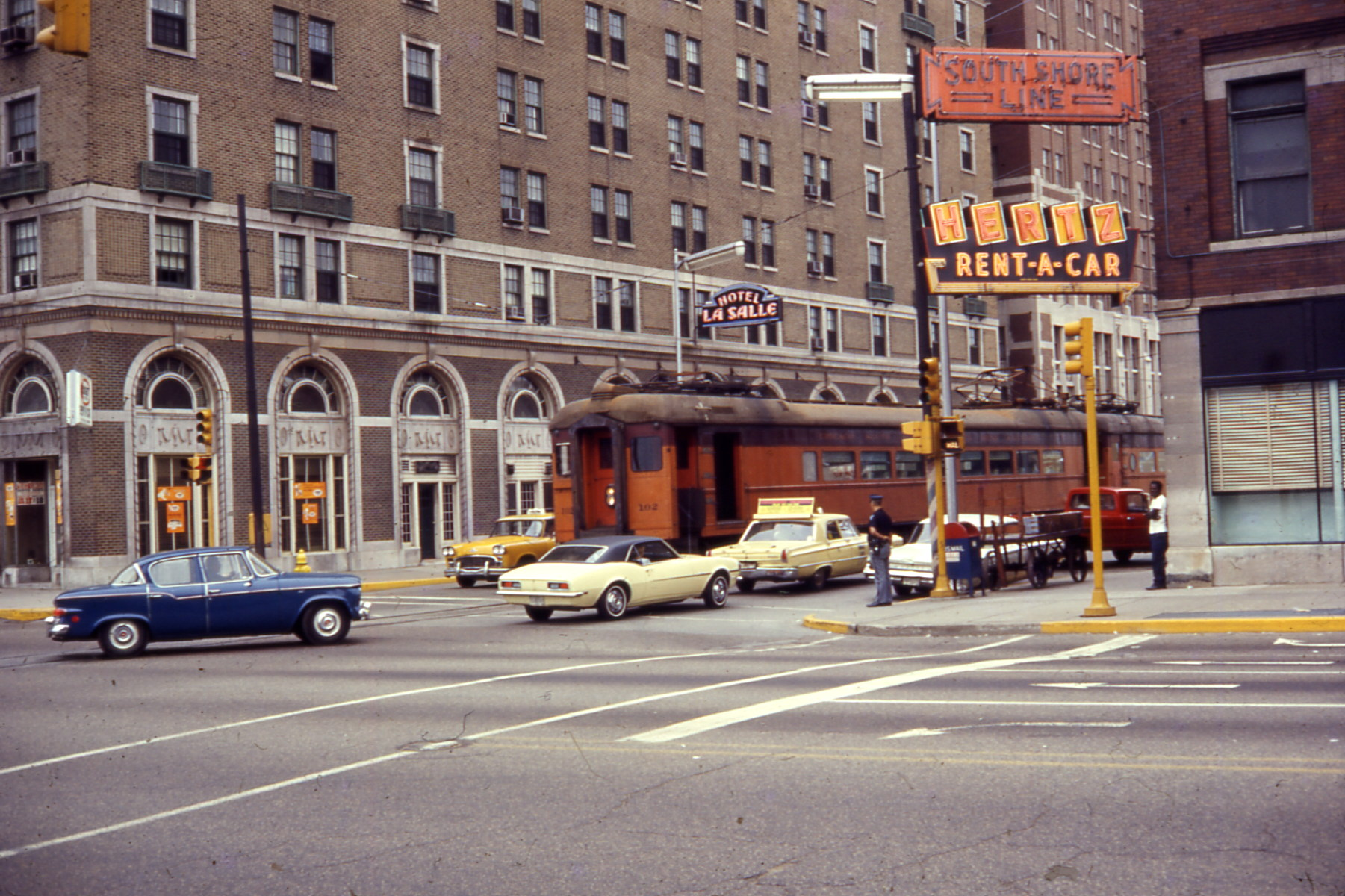

General information
- Location: LaSalle Ave. and Michigan St. South Bend, Indiana
- Coordinates: 41°40′45″N 86°15′02″W
- Tracks: 1

History
- Opened: August 3, 1921
- Closed: 1970
- Rebuilt: 1928
- Electrified: 1500v DC

Services
Preceding station	Chicago South Shore and South Bend Railroad	Following station
Bendix Drive toward Randolph Street	South Shore Line	Terminus
Location

South Bend was the eastern terminus of the South Shore Line located at the corner of LaSalle Avenue and Michigan Street in downtown South Bend, Indiana. It opened in 1921 and closed in 1970, when the South Shore Line eliminated street running within South Bend.

This station, situated on the site of a former Masonic Temple, was the South Shore's third South Bend station and opened on August 3, 1921. In 1928, the station was remodeled to resemble the 11th Street station in Michigan City. The redesigned station featured restrooms, waiting rooms, food concessions, and was staffed by a ticket agent. A tunnel connected the station with the LaSalle Hotel, located across the street. The LaSalle itself stood on the site of the Sheridan hotel, which had formerly housed the South Shore station.

The South Bend terminal remained in service until 1970, when the Chicago, South Shore and South Bend Railroad eliminated street running in South Bend by truncating the line. It was replaced by a new station at Washington Street.

== See also ==
- Proposed new South Shore Line station in South Bend
