= University Park station =

Commuter rail station in University Park, Illinois

University Park

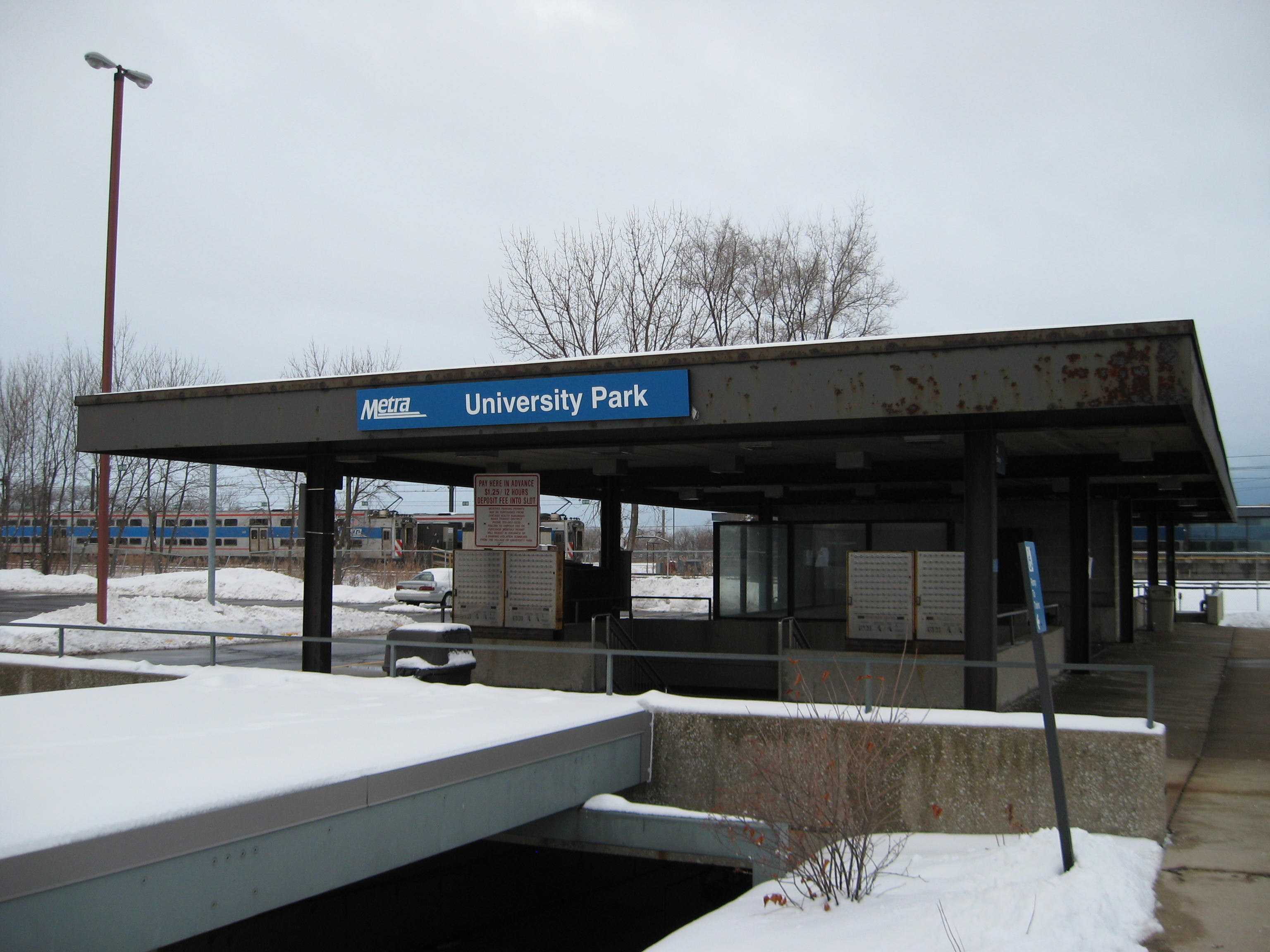
- University Park station in December 2010.

General information
- Location: 1900 University Parkway; University Park, Illinois 60484
- Coordinates: 41.4593°N 87.7234°W
- Owner: Metra
- Line: University Park Sub District
- Platforms: 1 island platform
- Tracks: 2 tracks
- Connections: Pace bus River Valley Metro bus

Construction
- Parking: Yes
- Accessible: Yes

Other information
- Fare zone: 3

History
- Opened: 1977
- Former names: Park Forest South

Passengers
- 2018: 808 (average weekday) ▼10.9%
- Rank: 64 out of 236

Services
Preceding station	Metra	Following station
Terminus	Metra Electric Main Line	Richton Park toward Millennium
Track layout
Location

University Park is a station on Metra's Metra Electric District line located in University Park, Illinois. University Park is the southern terminus of the Metra Electric main line and is 31.5 miles (50.7 km) away from the northern terminus at Millennium Station. The station is located on South Governor's Highway near West Stuenkel Road. In Metra's zone-based fare system, University Park is in zone 3. As of 2018, University Park is the 64th busiest of Metra's 236 non-downtown stations, with an average of 808 weekday boardings.

University Park station is located at grade level. The station consists of one island platform which serves two tracks; Canadian National tracks (ex-Illinois Central) parallel the Metra Electric tracks. The station has an unstaffed waiting room with a ticket vending machine. Parking is available at the station. University Park opened in 1977; Metra Electric service (then part of the Illinois Central Railroad) previously had terminated at Richton Park, the first stop after University Park.

The station is scheduled to be completely reconstructed in the near future.

== Station layout ==
University Park has an underground mezzanine containing ticket vending machines, as well as parking token machines. The platform serves two tracks. Both tracks continue into the yard, however, due to the frequency of the Metra Electric District, most trains do not continue into the yard. On the platform, two 24/7 shelters are available. Trains board on both sides of the platform, however, most trains departing to Chicago board from the inbound side.

== Bus connections ==
Pace

- 367 University Park (weekdays only)

River Valley Metro

- University Park Commuter Routes 1 and 2
