= Blue Island/Vermont Street station =

Commuter rail station in Blue Island, Illinois

Blue Island/Vermont St

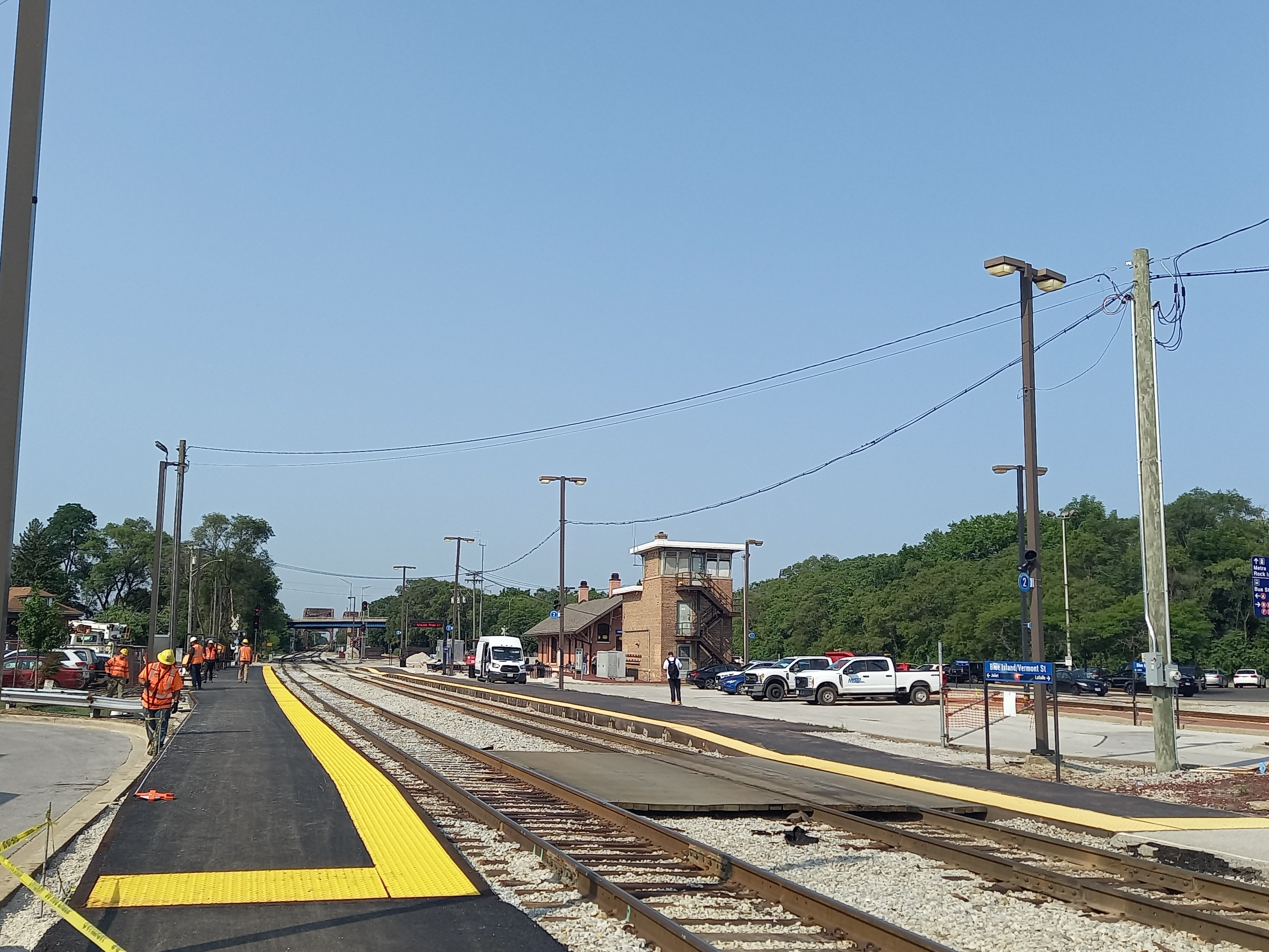
- Platforms for the Rock Island District station

General information
- Location: 2300 West Grove Street; Blue Island, Illinois
- Coordinates: 41.6548°N 87.6778°W
- Owner: City of Blue Island
- Lines: Joliet Subdistrict (Rock Island); Blue Island Subdistrict (Metra Electric)
- Platforms: 3 side platforms (Rock Island); 1 island platform (Metra Electric)
- Tracks: 4 (Rock Island); 3 (Metra Electric)
- Connections: Pace

Construction
- Parking: Yes
- Accessible: Yes (both lines)

Other information
- Fare zone: 2

History
- Opened: 1868
- Electrified: 1926 ( only)

Passengers
- 2018: 595 (average weekday) ▼13.5% (RI)
- Rank: 84 out of 236 (RI)
- 2018: 197 (average weekday) ▲8.8% (ME)
- Rank: 164 out of 236 (ME)

Services
Preceding station	Metra	Following station
Robbins toward Joliet	Rock Island Beverly Branch	Prairie Street weekday limited toward LaSalle
Robbins toward Joliet	Rock Island	103rd Street/Washington Heights toward LaSalle
at adjacent Blue Island station
Terminus	Metra Electric Blue Island Branch	Burr Oak toward Millennium
Former services
Preceding station	Metra	Following station
Robbins toward Joliet	Rock Island Rush hour only	Givins closed 1984 toward LaSalle
Preceding station	Chicago, Rock Island and Pacific Railroad	Following station
Joliet toward Colorado Springs	Main Line	Washington Heights toward Chicago
Robbins toward Joliet	Suburban Service via Main Line	Givins toward Chicago
Robbins toward Joliet	Suburban Service via Beverly	Blue Island Prairie Street toward Chicago
Preceding station	Illinois Central Railroad	Following station
at adjacent Blue Island station
Terminus	Electric Suburban Blue Island Branch	Burr Oak toward Randolph Street
Track layout
Location

Blue Island/Vermont Street is a Metra station in Blue Island, Illinois, servicing the Rock Island District and Metra Electric District Lines. On the Rock Island, it is 16.4 miles (26.4 km) from LaSalle Street Station. For the Metra Electric, it is the southern terminus of the Blue Island Branch, and is 18.9 miles (30.4 km) from Millennium Station.

On the Rock Island Line, as of 2022, Blue Island/Vermont Street is served by 74 trains (37 in each direction) on weekdays, by all 33 trains (16 inbound, 17 outbound) on Saturdays, and by all 28 trains (14 in each direction) on Sundays and holidays.

On weekdays, 16 inbound trains originate, and 16 outbound trains terminate, at Vermont Street. On weekends and holidays, six inbound trains originate, and six outbound trains terminate, at Vermont Street. All trains that terminate/originate from here travel along the Rock Island's Beverly Branch, with all Main Line trains originating or terminating at points further south.

On the Metra Electric Line, as of 2022, Blue Island is served by 18 trains (eight inbound, 10 outbound) on weekdays, and by eight trains (four in each direction) on Saturdays, with no service on the branch on Sundays or holidays.

The two stations share the same parking facilities and the same bus connections. Although these two stations are across the street from each other and trains do not use the same platform areas, the proximity of the two to each other functionally allows riders to transfer from one to the other with only a very short walk (less than an eighth of a mile) between them.

Blue Island/Vermont Street is one of the busiest stations on the Rock Island District. It is the centerpiece of the entire line, historically and presently. Many trains terminate here, most of them locals on the Beverly Branch, and most rush hour trains stop at this station, running express to and from this station. A coach yard is located just north of the station and is used to store out-of-service trains when not in use.

Vermont Street is a favorite of railfans due to its unique four-track setup, frequent train action, and switching movements. Later on in the day, Iowa Interstate Railroad runs a daily freight train along the Rock Island tracks, from Blue Island to Council Bluffs, Iowa. For this reason, this daily freight train is officially named the BICB. Blue Island's police and fire departments are located several blocks away from Vermont Street.

Blue Island/Vermont Street station and Blue Island station are both in zone 2 of Metra's zone-based fare system. As of 2018, Blue Island/Vermont Street station on the Rock Island District is the 84th busiest of Metra's 236 non-downtown stations, with an average of 595 weekday boardings. Blue Island station on Metra Electric is the 164th busiest of Metra's 236 non-downtown stations, with an average of 197 weekday boardings.

== History ==
Rock Island service was established in Blue Island in 1852, and the current brick station at Vermont Street replaced the original frame depot in 1868. The Beverly Branch splits from the main line here and runs at the base of the ridge serving stations in Blue Island and the Chicago neighborhoods of Morgan Park and Beverly before veering east to serve Brainard and reconnecting to the main line at the Gresham station at 87th and Vincennes. This branch line was created in 1889 through the influence of the Blue Island Land and Building Company to serve its interests in the development of what was then the village of Morgan Park and carries most of the passenger traffic for the area, although some rush-hour trains travel north-east on the main line. In 1891, the Metra Electric station was built as a branch of the Illinois Central's commuter line from Kensington-115th Street.

On July 12, 1971, the station began service to Amtrak trains. (The sited station list shows non-Amtrak stations, and mentions that at the top of the page. The cash-starved Rock Island could not afford to join Amtrak, and ran their own intercity passenger trains until Illinois withdrew the operating subsidy and service was terminated on December 31, 1978.) By the 1980s, the station became part of the Metra system.

== Tracks ==
The station has six tracks for in-service trains, four for the Rock Island and two for the Metra Electric. Of the Rock Island platforms, two are on the Beverly Branch, and two are on the main line. Each branch has one side platform, but all four tracks can be accessed. Most trains on the Beverly Branch terminate at this station, (except late at night,) and run inbound back to LaSalle Street Station.

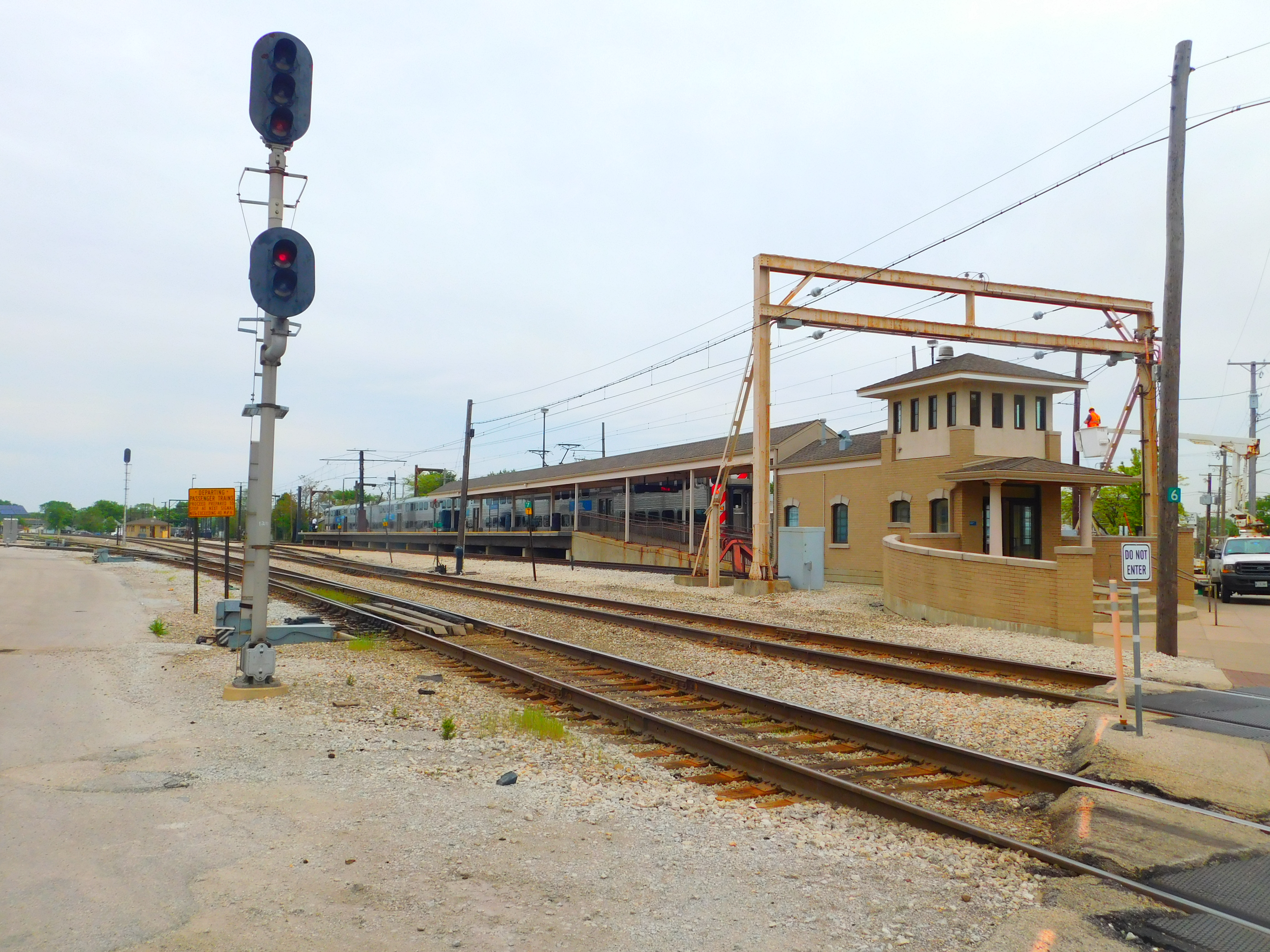
The Metra Electric station at Blue Island

The Metra Electric station, being a stub terminus, has two tracks and one island platform. It is currently the only accessible station on the Blue Island branch, and one of only two stations on the branch to have more than one track, the other being West Pullman where the line has a passing siding.

== Bus connections ==
Pace

- 348 Harvey/Riverdale/Blue Island (weekdays only)
- 349 South Western
- 359 Robbins/South Kedzie Avenue
- 385 87th/111th/127th (weekdays only)
