= Millennium Station =

Commuter rail station in Chicago, Illinois

Millennium Station

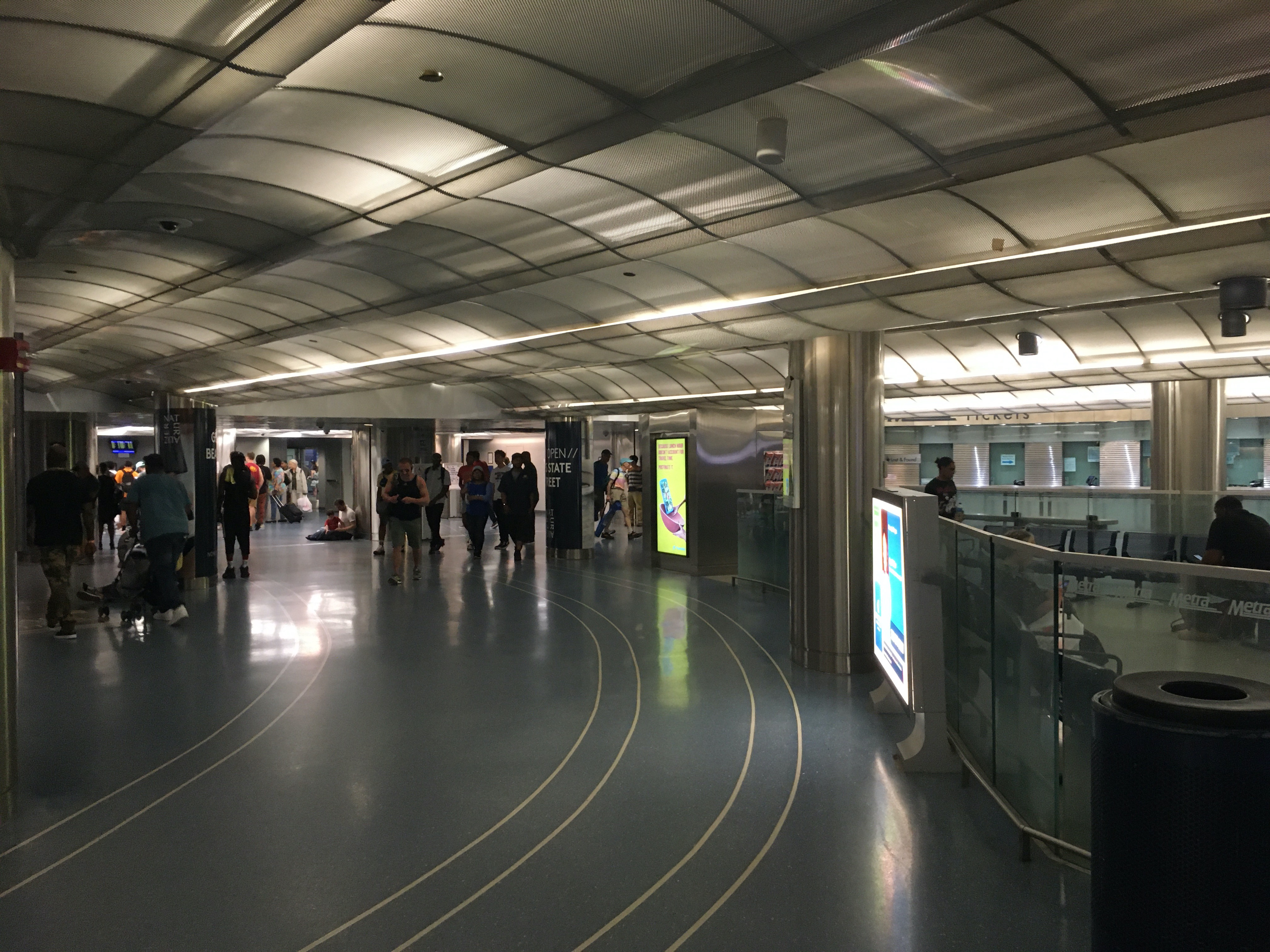
- Concourse of Millennium Station

General information
- Location: 151 East Randolph Street; Chicago Loop, Chicago, IL 60601
- Coordinates: (150 N/150 E); 41.88594°N 87.62345°W
- Owner: Metra
- Platforms: 6 island platforms (plus one unused)
- Tracks: 12 revenue (7 upper-level South Shore Line, 5 lower-level Metra), 1 non-revenue
- Connections: Brown Orange Pink Purple Green at Washington/Wabash; CTA Buses; Chicago Pedway

Construction
- Accessible: Yes

Other information
- Fare zone: 1 (Metra and South Shore)

History
- Opened: 1856, 1926
- Rebuilt: 1985, 2005
- Electrified: 1926
- Former names: Randolph Street Station or Randolph Street Terminal

Services
Preceding station	Metra	Following station
Van Buren Street toward University Park, South Chicago or Blue Island	Metra Electric	Terminus
Preceding station	NICTD	Following station
Van Buren Street toward South Bend Airport	Lakeshore Corridor	Terminus
Van Buren Street toward Munster/Dyer	Monon Corridor peak hours	Terminus
Former services
Preceding station	Illinois Central Railroad	Following station
Van Buren Street toward Richton, 91st Street or Blue Island	Electric Suburban	Terminus
Van Buren Street toward Addison	West Suburban	Terminus
Track layout
Location

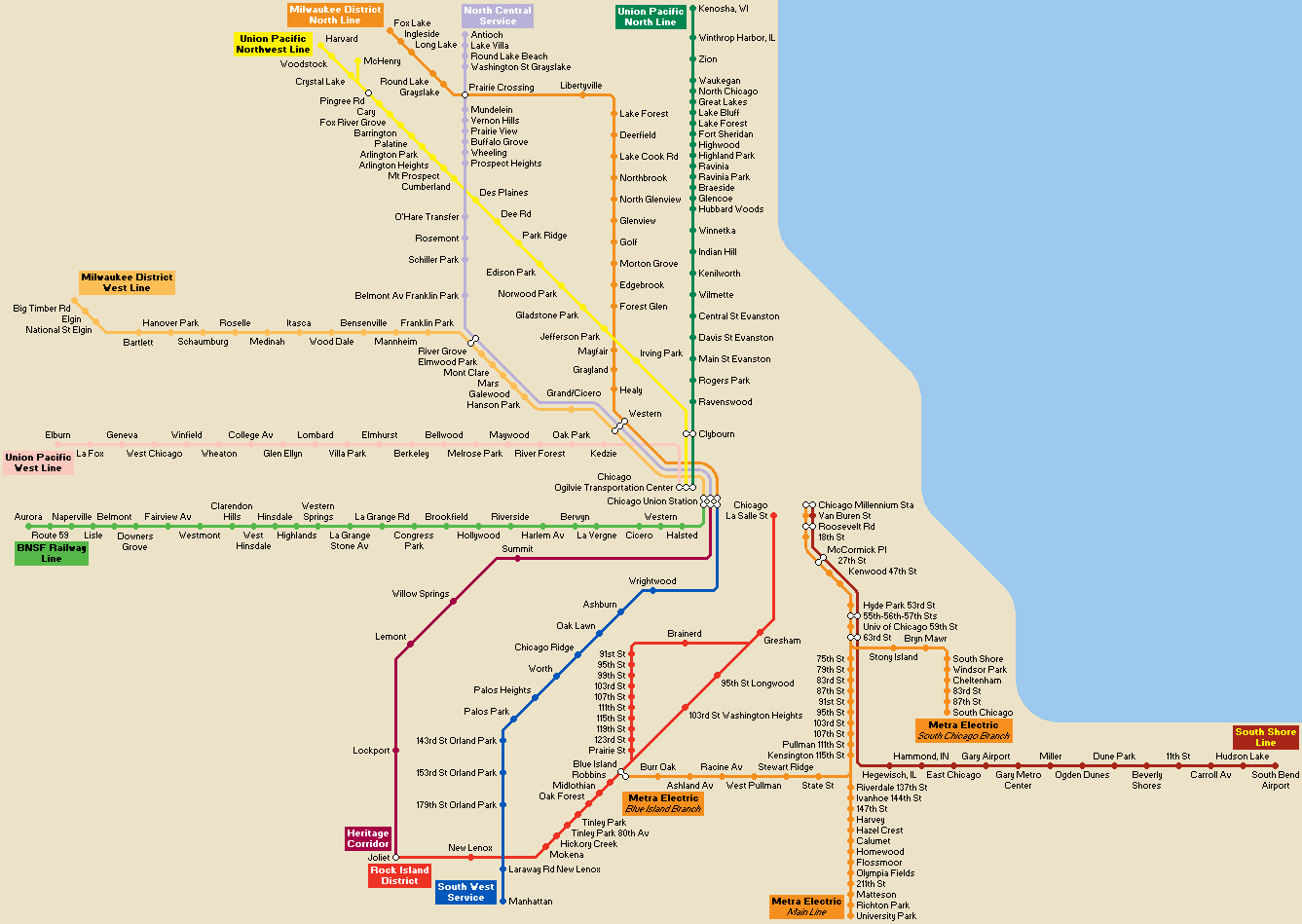
Commuter lines terminating at Randolph Street, shown in Panama Orange and Dark South Shore Burgundy on this schematic, serve Chicago's southern and eastern suburbs in Illinois and Indiana

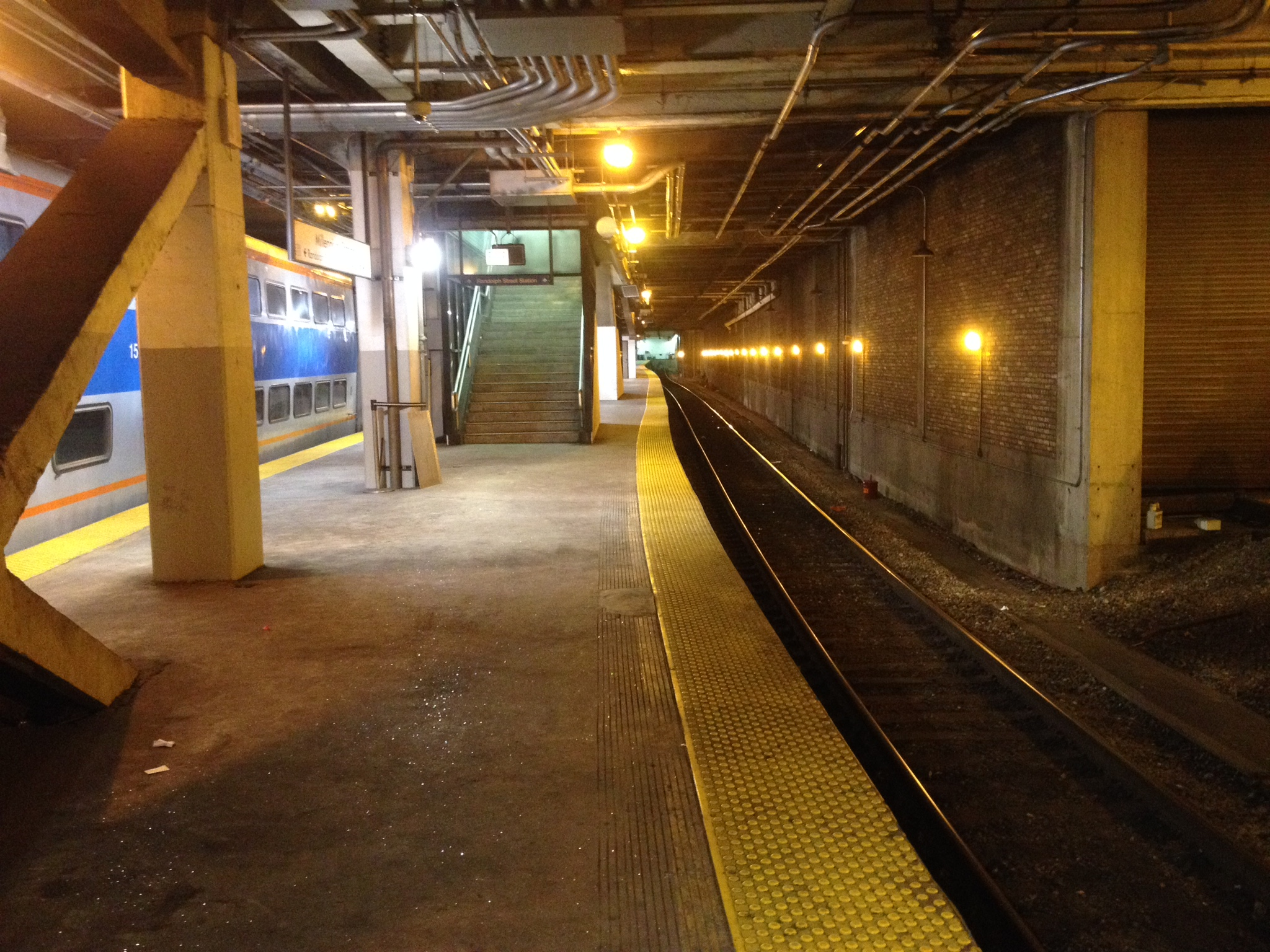
One of the platforms at Metra

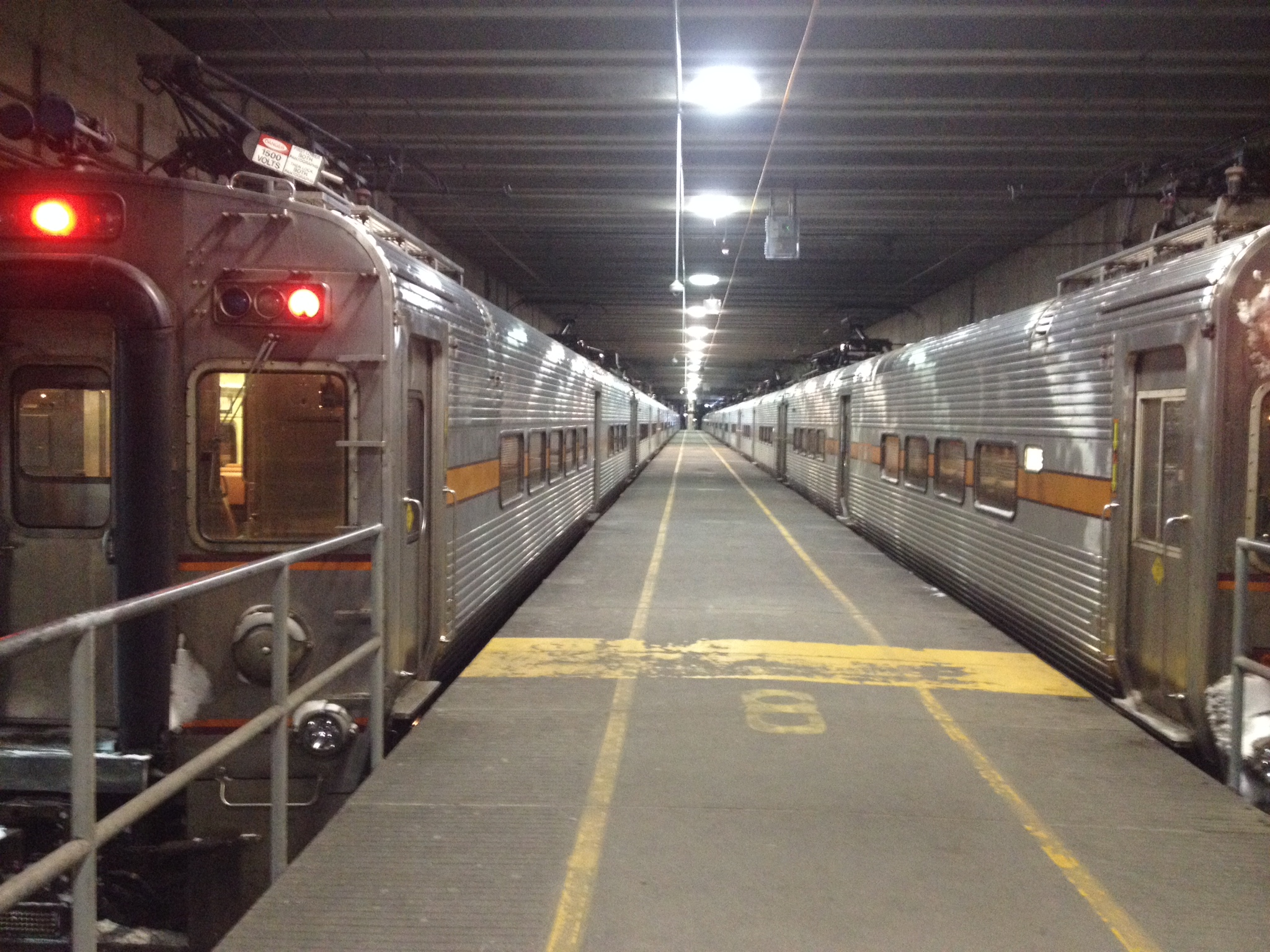
The platform of the South Shore Line

Millennium Station (previously known as Randolph Street Terminal and occasionally referred to as Randolph Street station or Randolph/South Water Street station) is a commuter rail terminal located in the Loop area of downtown Chicago. It marks the northern endpoint of the Metra Electric District, which goes to the southern suburbs of Chicago; it also serves as the western terminus for the South Shore Line, providing access to northern Indiana, as far as South Bend, Indiana.

Now located under Millennium Park, a terminal station (Great Central Station) was first established here in the 1800s by the Illinois Central Railroad (IC) but has gone through several re-configurations. Most recently, it was rebuilt with the park in the early 21st century and is owned by Metra through its operating arm, the Northeast Illinois Regional Commuter Railroad Corporation. Not counting commuters on the South Shore Line, over 18,000 people board Metra trains at Millennium Station each day. During peak periods, trains leave the terminal as frequently as twice a minute. It is the third-busiest train station in Chicago.

== History ==
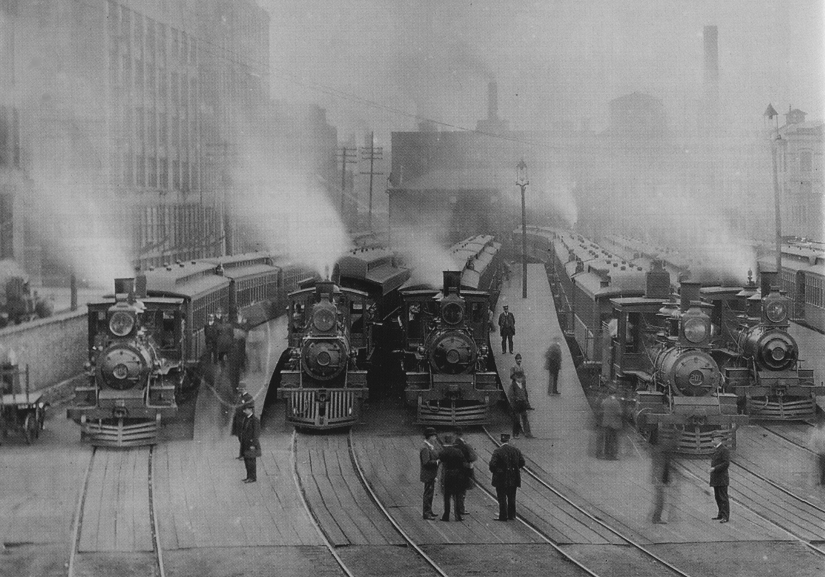
Randolph Street station, 1895

As Great Central Station, Randolph Street Terminal, along with Van Buren Street a few blocks south, was IC's primary downtown Chicago terminal until the completion in 1893 of Central Station (closed 1972) just south of Grant Park at today's Roosevelt Road. It still received many trains thereafter, but was of secondary importance. Its importance increased dramatically in 1926 with the electrification of commuter services on IC's main line and its Blue Island and South Chicago branches. Commuter trains from all three branches were now routed into the Randolph Street terminal, while intercity traffic continued to terminate at Central Station.

For many years, the station platforms were exposed and the ticketing facilities and the waiting room were located in the attached facility. The construction of Millennium Park gradually placed the entire station "underground." Randolph Street Station existed in a state of perpetual construction from the mid-1980s until 2005: exposed steel girders covered in flame retardant, unpainted plywood walls, bare concrete floors, and dim utility lights created a notoriously unfriendly, cave-like environment. Skidmore, Owings and Merrill was the architect for the station redesign. With the completion of construction in 2005, the station was renamed Millennium Station. However, many longtime Chicago-area residents still call it "Randolph Street Terminal."

== Station layout ==
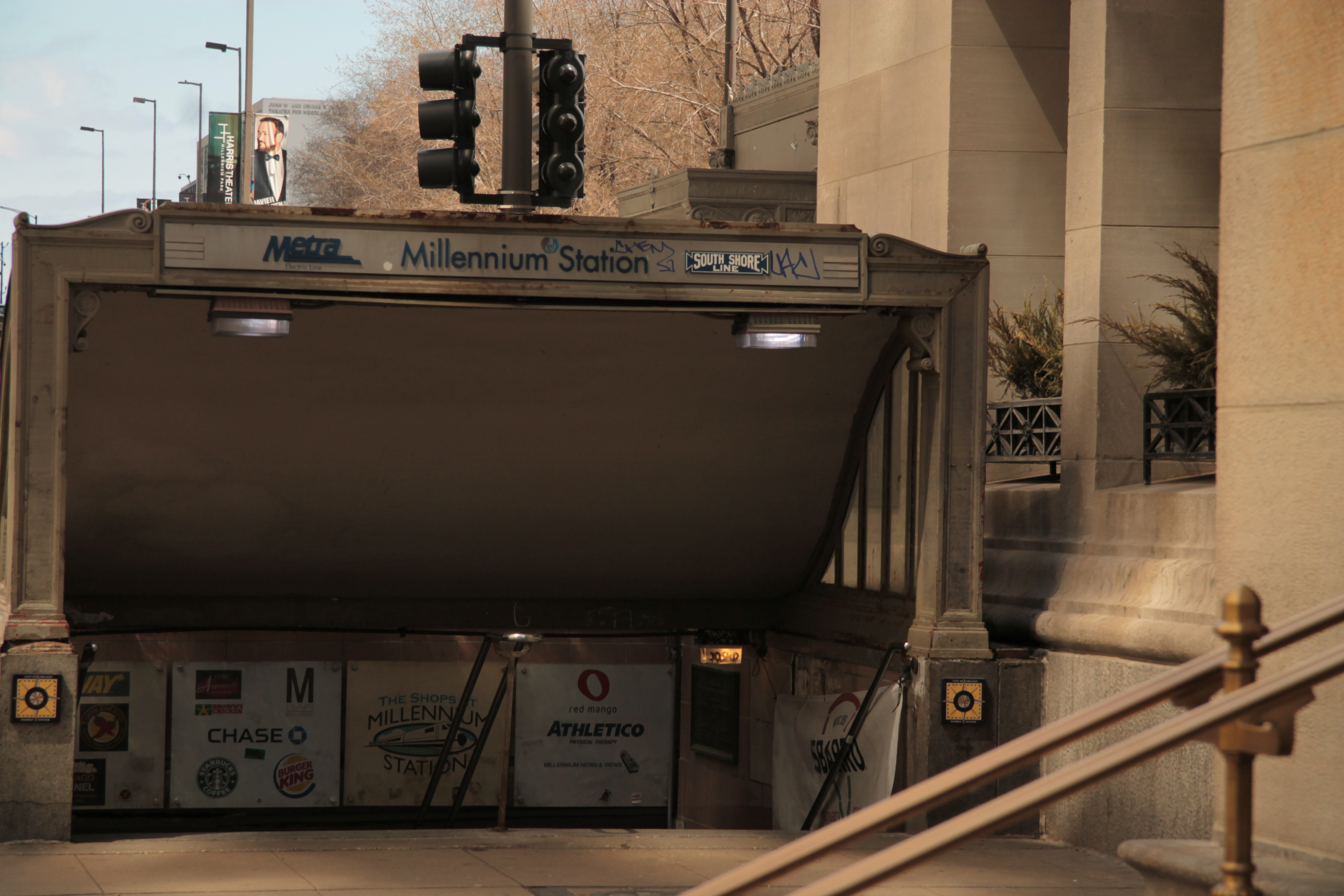
The main entrance located at the intersection of Randolph Street and Michigan Avenue.

The main entrance to the station is at the southwest corner of the intersection of Randolph Street and Michigan Avenue. From the entrance, a concourse lined with shops and restaurants leads to the main waiting area. The waiting area consists of a number of benches and ticket vending machines as well as a ticket counter and information desk for Metra.

From the waiting room, there is a passage to the upper-level South Shore Line platforms, and along this passage is a set of ticket windows for the South Shore Line. At the north end of the South Shore Line platforms, there is a set of ticket vending machines. On the lower level are the Metra tracks, accessed by staircases or ramps from the concourse. The Metra platforms have a secondary exit at Lower South Water Street on the north end. This exit is due to be reconstructed in the near future.

== Bus connections ==
CTA

- 3 King Drive
- 4 Cottage Grove (Owl Service)
- X4 Cottage Grove Express
- 6 Jackson Park Express
- 19 United Center Express
- 20 Madison
- 26 South Shore Express
- 60 Blue Island/26th
- N66 Chicago (Owl Service)
- 124 Navy Pier
- 143 Stockton/Michigan Express
- 147 Outer DuSable Lake Shore Express
- 148 Clarendon/Michigan Express
- 151 Sheridan
- 157 Streeterville/Taylor

Pace

- 855 Plainfield-East Loop Express

ChicaGo Dash

- Shuttle Service between Downtown Chicago and Valparaiso (Rush Hour Only)

== Pedway connections ==
Millennium Station acts as a central hub for various connections within the Chicago Pedway, linking it to numerous hotels, residential and office buildings, "L" stations, and other prominent sites. The pedway features a variety of shops, restaurants, and services. Although certain sections are accessible around the clock, the majority shut down by 7:00 PM on weekdays and 6:00 PM on weekends, limiting access during off-hours.

=== Westbound corridor ===
- Smurfit–Stone Building
- Chicago Cultural Center
- The Heritage at Millennium Park
- Washington/Wabash station
- Macy's
- Lake/State station
- Block 37
- Washington/Dearborn station
- Richard J. Daley Center
- Cook County Building

=== Eastbound corridor ===
- Harris Theater
- Jay Pritzker Pavilion

=== Northbound corridor ===
- Two Prudential Plaza
- Aon Center
- Lakeshore Athletic Club
- Fairmont Hotel
- Park Millennium Condominiums
- Aqua building

=== Via South Water Street exit ===
- Boulevard Towers
- Illinois Center
- Hyatt Regency Chicago
- Columbus Plaza
- Renaissance Hotel
- Swissotel Chicago
- Aqua building

== In popular culture ==
In the 2008 film The Dark Knight, there is a brief shot where the Batpod is driven through Millennium Station's concourse during a chase scene.
