= South Shore, Chicago =

Community area in Chicago, Illinois

South Shore
- Community area
- Community Area 43 – South Shore
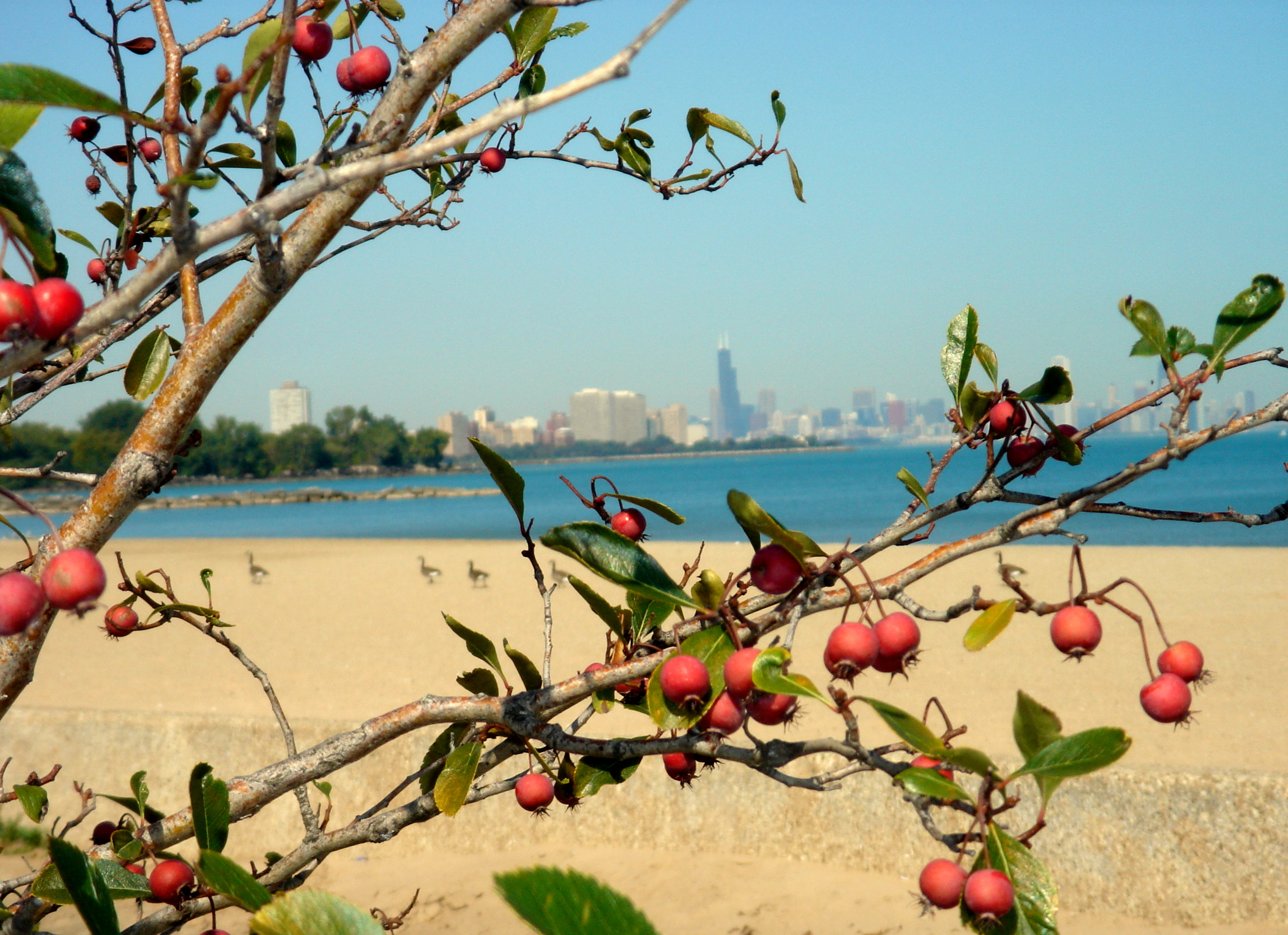
- Rainbow Beach along the shore of Lake Michigan.

- Location within the city of Chicago
- Coordinates: 41°45.6′N 87°34.8′W
- Country: United States
- State: Illinois
- County: Cook
- City: Chicago
- Neighborhoods: list: Jackson Park Highlands; South Shore

Area
  - Total: 2.99 sq mi (7.74 km^{2})

Population (2024)
  - Total: 53,588
  - Density: 17,900/sq mi (6,920/km^{2})

Demographics 2024
  - White: 3.6 %
  - Black: 90.0%
  - Hispanic: 3.1%
  - Asian: 0.4%
  - Other: 2.9%
- Time zone: UTC−6 (CST)
  - Summer (DST): UTC−5 (CDT)
- ZIP Codes: parts of 60619, 60637, and 60649
- Median household income: $26,425
- Source: U.S. Census, Record Information Services

South Shore is one of the 77 community areas of Chicago in Illinois, United States. Located on the city's South Side, the area is named for its location along the city's southern lakefront. Although South Shore has seen a greater than 40% decrease in residents since Chicago's population peaked in the 1950s, the area remains one of the most densely populated neighborhoods on the South Side. The community benefits from its location along the waterfront, its accessibility to Lake Shore Drive, and its proximity to major institutions and attractions such as the University of Chicago, the Museum of Science and Industry, and Jackson Park.

== History ==
Like all of the City of Chicago, the South Shore community area was originally inhabited by a number of Algonquian peoples, including the Mascouten and Miami. After the expulsion of Native Americans by white settlers in the nineteenth century, it became characterized by small settlements including Essex, Bryn Mawr, Parkside, Cheltenham Beach, and Windsor Park. The area is bounded by 67th and 79th streets to the north and south and by Stony Island Avenue and Lake Michigan to the west and east. In 1861, the Illinois General Assembly incorporated Hyde Park Township, which included South Shore. The area's population grew as workers in the nearby steel industry settled in the area. Following the June 29, 1889 elections, the South Shore community area was annexed into the City of Chicago with the entirety of Hyde Park Township. The location of the World's Columbian Exposition in nearby Jackson Park prompted the sale of land and building lots. As in other parts of Chicago, the desire for affordable housing at the start of the twentieth century led to the large scale construction of bungalows. Unlike other areas in which bungalows were built en masse, South Shore's bungalow residents were largely affluent. Additionally, South Shore was the destination for white flight from Washington Park as immigrants and African Americans moved there.

After racially restrictive covenants were declared unconstitutional by Shelley v. Kraemer, African American families began to move into historically white neighborhoods such as South Shore. The South Shore Commission initiated a program they called "managed integration", designed to check the physical decline of the community and to achieve racial balance. The initiative was largely unsuccessful on both counts. Per the 1950 census, South Shore had 79,000 residents and was 96% white. A 1951 University of Chicago study estimated that over 20% of the neighborhood's residents were Jewish. In 1960, the population had dropped to 73,000 residents and was 90% white and 10% Black. Like many other urban neighborhoods across the United States undergoing racial change and tensions, many of the white residents began to choose to move to new locations. By 1970, the population had risen to 81,000 and was 69% black and 28% white as South Shore itself became a victim of white flight. By 1980, the population had fallen slightly to 78,000, but was 94% black.

By the late 1990s South Shore had developed into a middle-class African American community. The Chicago Park District purchased the waning South Shore Country Club in 1972, converting it into a cultural center.

== Neighborhoods and sub-areas ==
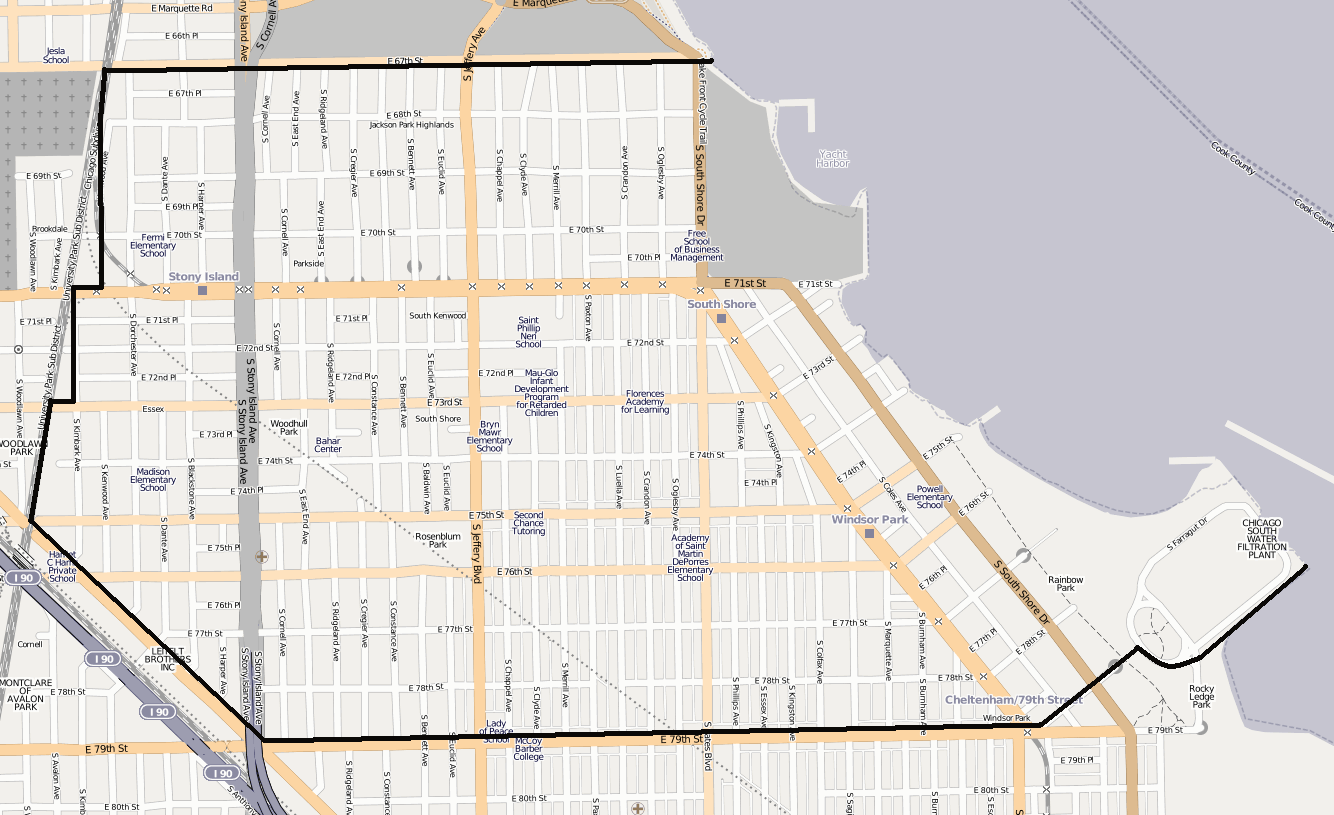
Map of the South Shore neighborhood.

=== Jackson Park Highlands ===
The Jackson Park Highlands District is a sixteen block area bounded by East 67th Street on the north. East 71st Street on the south, South Cregier Avenue on the west, and South Jeffrey Boulevard on the east.

The Jackson Park Highlands District is a historic district in the South Shore community area of Chicago. The district was built in 1905 by various architects. It was designated a Chicago Landmark on October 25, 1989.

=== Jeffery–Cyril Historic District ===
The Jeffery–Cyril Historic District is a national historic district in the South Shore neighborhood of Chicago, Illinois. The district comprises a cluster of six apartment buildings on Jeffery Boulevard, 71st Place, and Cyril Avenue. All six buildings were built between 1927 and 1929. The district was added to the National Register of Historic Places on May 5, 1986.

=== South Shore Bungalow Historic District ===
The South Shore Bungalow Historic District is a residential historic district in the South Shore neighborhood of Chicago, Illinois. The district contains 229 Chicago bungalows and twenty other residential buildings built between 1911 and 1930. The district was added to the National Register of Historic Places on December 10, 2008.

== Architecture ==
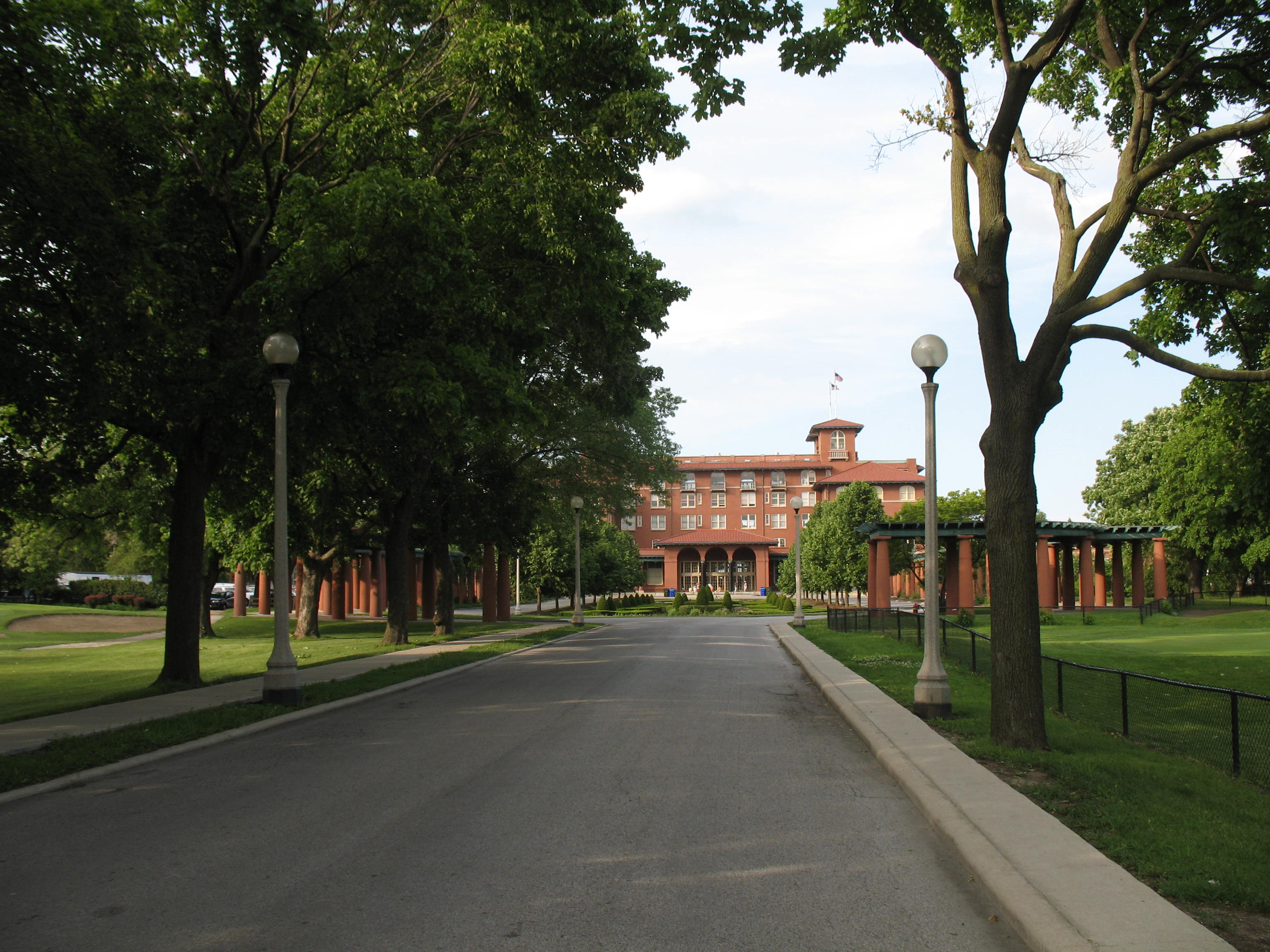
South Shore Cultural Center

The South Shore Cultural Center, previously the South Shore Country Club, began as a lakefront retreat for the wealthiest of Chicago's movers and shakers. The firm of Marshall and Fox, architects of the Drake, Blackstone, and Edgewater Beach hotels, were hired to design an opulent, Mediterranean-style clubhouse for a membership that included some of Chicago's most prominent families. The grounds provided private stables and members-only beach, and golf course. Tennis, horseback riding, and skeet shooting were enjoyed by guests the likes of Jean Harlow, Will Rogers, and Amelia Earhart.

Between the first and second World Wars, a housing boom brought a development of luxury cooperative apartments and mansions to the neighborhood surrounding the club. In 1974 the club held its last members-only event. The Chicago Park District owns the property. It has been restored to its original design and is open to the public.

An ongoing issue in the South Shore and surrounding South Chicago neighborhoods is that they are one of the few remaining Chicago lakefront neighborhoods that lack a fully publicly accessible neighborhood shoreline.

Severe storms eroded the former Manhattan Beach between the South Shore Cultural Center and the northern end of Rainbow Beach. After a lengthy legal battle, developer Henry Dubin won the right to develop properties that were completely submerged by Lake Michigan, constructing a condominium complex atop an enormous concrete slab covering the extent of the formerly dry plot of land. Ordinarily submerged properties would become state property, allowing maintenance of a continuous public shoreline. This small stretch of privately held lakefront property marks the southern terminus of the Chicago Lakefront Trail, and pedestrians and cyclists must travel inland along South Shore Drive to reach the lakefront public lands farther south.

South of Rainbow Beach is the former site of the South Works steel mill. While this huge lakefront plot of land is planned to include public lakefront park facilities, it is currently undeveloped and undergoing environmental remediation. Steelworkers Park provides publicly accessible lakefront parkland, but most of this section of the lake shore is industrial brownfield that is not open to the public. Quantum Shore, a technology and industrial campus focused on quantum computing, is being developed on part of the former steel mill property.

At the northern end of South Shore is the historic district of Jackson Park Highlands, one of Chicago's greatest examples of structural history and 19th-century architecture, with a number of homes in the style of American Foursquare, Colonial Revival, and Renaissance Revival on suburban-sized lots. While much of the South Shore neighborhood has suffered from abandonment and demolition of older architecture, this section has maintained most of its historic character in good condition.

Located in the Bryn Mawr section of South Shore is the Allan Miller House at 7121 South Paxton Avenue. Commissioned by advertising executive Allan Miller, this home is an example of Prairie-style architecture in the area. Built in 1915, it is Chicago's only surviving building designed by John Van Bergen, a former member of Frank Lloyd Wright's architecture firm.

== Politics ==
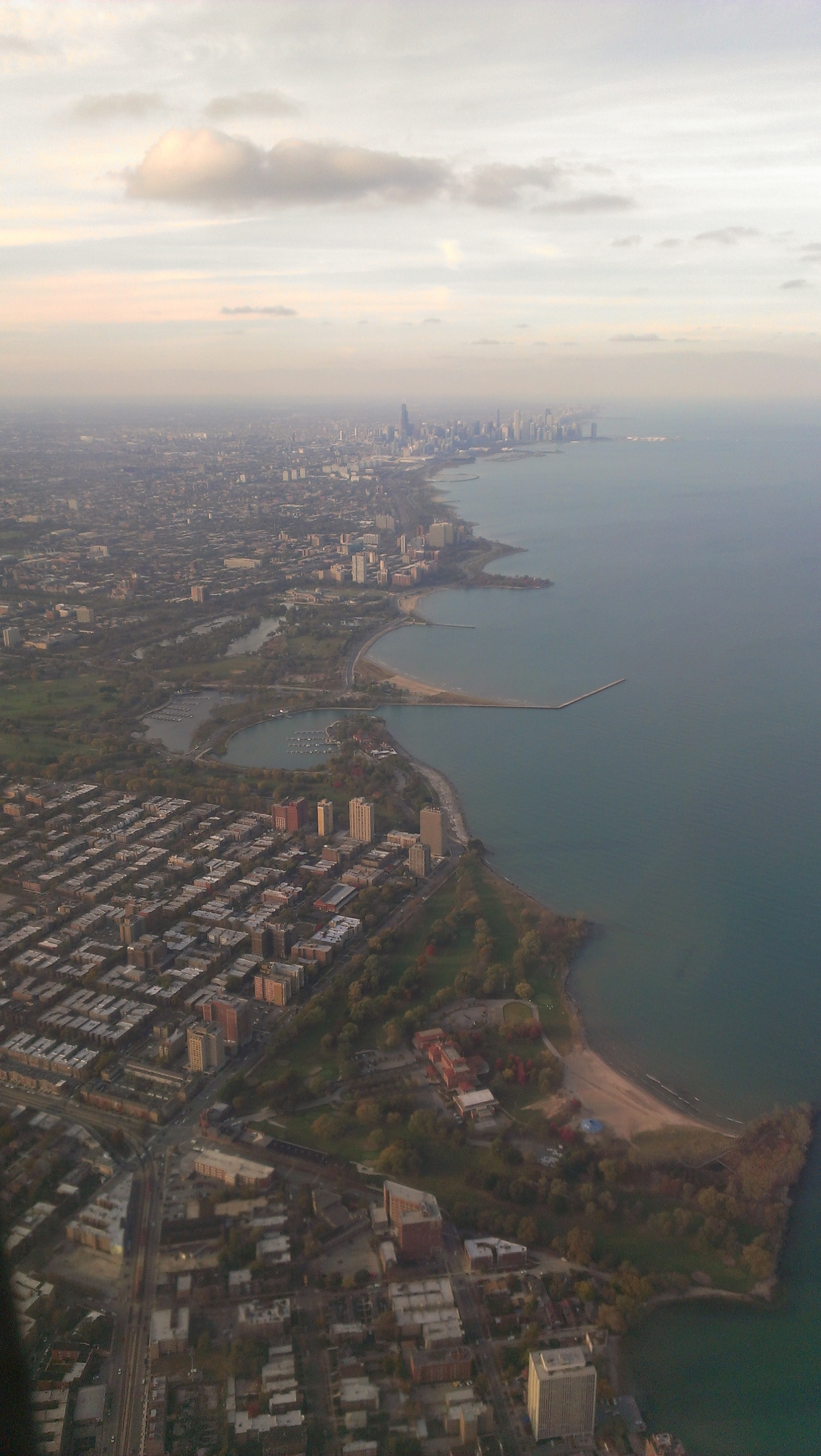
Aerial view of South Shore and Hyde Park in 2015

The South Shore community area has supported the Democratic Party in the past two presidential elections by overwhelming margins. In the 2016 presidential election, the South Shore cast 18,130 votes for Hillary Clinton and cast 373 votes for Donald Trump (96.07% to 1.98%). In the 2012 presidential election, South Shore cast 22,515 votes for Barack Obama and cast 222 votes for Mitt Romney (98.77% to 0.97%).

== Crime and policing ==
On July 14, 2018, the community clashed with the Chicago Police Department after a local barber, Harith Augustus, was shot multiple times by a police officer at 71st Street and Chappel Avenue. Body camera footage without audio was released immediately contrary to past practices of months-long waits for video in other police shootings. Footage taken by body cameras of other officers has not been released.

== Culture and religion ==
The Nation of Islam National Center and Mosque Maryam are at 7351 South Stony Island Avenue. The National Black United Front has its headquarters in the community.

The Roman Catholic Archdiocese of Chicago operates Catholic churches. On July 1, 2020, Our Lady of Peace, St. Bride, and St. Philip Neri in South Shore and Our Lady Gate of Heaven Church in Jeffery Manor will merge.

== Transportation ==
The South Shore community area has five stations along the South Chicago Branch of the Metra Electric District. In South Shore, the South Chicago Branch runs the median of along East 71st Street, making stops at Stony Island, Bryn Mawr, and South Shore stations before turning southeast along South Exchange Avenue to make stops at Windsor Park and Cheltenham stations. In addition, the 75th Street station is on the Greater Grand Crossing side of the border between that area and South Shore.

== Education ==
Chicago Public Schools operates district public schools.

Urban Prep Academies has a South Shore Campus.

Muhammad University of Islam, a Nation of Islam-affiliated primary and secondary school, is adjacent to the Mosque Maryam.

In 2024, 24.9 percent of adults over the age of 25 had a bachelor's degree or higher, an increase from 16.0 percent in 2000. 88.3 percent of adults had graduated high school, an increase from 78.2 percent in 2000.

Historical population
| Census | Pop. | Note | %± |
|---|---|---|---|
| 1930 | 78,755 | | — |
| 1940 | 79,593 | | 1.1% |
| 1950 | 79,336 | | −0.3% |
| 1960 | 73,086 | | −7.9% |
| 1970 | 80,527 | | 10.2% |
| 1980 | 77,743 | | −3.5% |
| 1990 | 61,517 | | −20.9% |
| 2000 | 61,556 | | 0.1% |
| 2010 | 49,767 | | −19.2% |
| 2020 | 53,971 | | 8.4% |

== Notable people ==
- Marshall Bennett (1915–2018), real estate developer credited with creating the modern industrial park. He was a childhood resident of South Shore.
- Bo Diddley (1928–2008), singer, guitarist, songwriter and music producer. He resided in South Shore.
- Frank Drake (born 1930), astrophyscist and co-founder of Project Ozma. He was a childhood resident of 7347 South Crandon Avenue and a graduate of South Shore High School.
- Stanley Elkin (1930–1995), novelist, short story writer, and essayist. He was a childhood resident of South Shore.
- Larry Ellison (born 1944), co-founder of Oracle Corporation. He was raised in the South Shore community area by his adoptive parents.
- James T. Farrell (1904–1979), novelist, short-story writer and poet. He resided at 2023 East 72nd Street.
- Enrico Fermi (1901–1954), physicist and the creator of the world's first nuclear reactor. He resided in South Shore.
- Thomas Patrick Gerrity (1913–1968), General in the United States Air Force who commanded the Air Force Logistics Command from 1967 until his death one year later. He resided at 7838 South Excanaba Avenue for a time.
- Fred Goetz (1897–1934), Chicago Outfit member and a suspected participant in the Valentine's Day Massacre. He resided at 7827 South South Shore Drive at the time of his murder.
- S. I. Hayakawa (1906–1992), U.S. Senator from California from 1977 to 1983. At the time of the 1940 United States census, Hayakawa resided at 1715 East 67th Street.
- Fred Holstein (1942–2004), folk singer. He was raised in the South Shore community area.
- Murray Humphreys (1899–1965), member of the Chicago Outfit. He resided at 7710 S. Bennett Ave. for most of his criminal career.
- Robert Irving III (born 1953), musician and longtime South Shore resident.
- Jacqueline Jackson (born 1944), peace activist and wife of Jesse Jackson. She resided in South Shore for a time.
- Jesse Jackson (1941–2026), activist, Baptist minister, and politician. Jackson moved to South Shore in 1960 after his financial supporters purchased him a home in the area.
- Jesse Jackson Jr. (born 1965), member of the United States House of Representatives from Illinois's 2nd congressional district, son of Jesse and Jacqueline Jackson, and husband of Sandi Jackson. He was raised in South Shore and, as of 2018, is a current resident of South Shore.
- Jonathan Jackson (born 1966), businessman, activist, and son of Jesse and Jacqueline Jackson. He was a childhood resident of South Shore.
- Sandi Jackson (born 1963), politician and wife of Jesse Jackson Jr. She resided in South Shore during her political career.
- Santita Jackson (born 1963), singer, political commentator, and daughter of Jesse and Jacqueline Jackson. She was a childhood resident of South Shore.
- Jeremiah Jae (born 1989), rapper, record producer, and multi-media artist. He is a South Shore resident.
- Ferguson Jenkins (born 1942), professional baseball player. He resided at the home of fellow player Billy Williams for a time during their professional careers.
- Gene Krupa (1909–1973), jazz drummer, bandleader and composer. He was a childhood resident of South Shore.
- Ramsey Lewis (born 1935), jazz composer, pianist and radio personality. He resided in South Shore.
- Marv Levy (born 1925), football coach. He was raised in the South Shore neighborhood.
- David Mamet (born 1947), playwright. His family moved from Hyde Park to South Shore while he was a teenager.
- Raymond S. McKeough (1888–1979), member of the United States House of Representatives from Illinois's 2nd congressional district. He resided at 7815 South Euclid Avenue while in Congress.
- Carol Moseley Braun (born 1947), first African American woman elected to the United States Senate. She lived in South Shore during her political career.
- Michelle Obama (born 1964), 44th First Lady of the United States. She was born and raised in South Shore.
- Suze Orman (born 1951), author, financial advisor, motivational speaker, and television host.
- Jabari Parker (born 1995), professional basketball player. He was raised in South Shore.
- Mandy Patinkin (born 1952), actor and singer. He was a childhood resident of South Shore.
- Elia W. Peattie (1862–1935), author, journalist and critic. She resided near East 74th Street and South South Shore Drive for much of her life.
- Harry Mark Petrakis (1923–2021), novelist known for depictions of Greek-American life. He resided at 7603 South Ridgeland Avenue for a time.
- Dean Richards (born 1954), film critic and entertainment reporter for WGN-TV. He was raised in South Shore.
- Craig Robinson (born 1962), college basketball coach.
- Carlo Rotella, professor and recipient of the 2006 Guggenheim Fellowship. He was raised at South Oglesby Avenue and East 71st Street.
- Sebastian Rotella, foreign correspondent, investigative journalist, and novelist. He was a childhood resident of South Shore.
- Bashir Salahuddin (born 1976), actor, writer, and comedian. He was raised in South Shore on South Constance Avenue.
- Gale Sayers (1943–2020), professional football player. He resided in South Shore during his time with the Chicago Bears.
- Elmer Schnackenberg (1889–1968), Judge of the United States Court of Appeals for the Seventh Circuit. He resided at 2706 East 75th Place during his first tenure in the Illinois House of Representatives.
- Deborah Senn (1949–2022), 7th Insurance Commissioner of Washington from 1993 to 2001. She was raised in the South Shore neighborhood.
- Johnny Torrio (1882–1957), early member of the Chicago Outfit. Torrio resided in South Shore for a portion of his criminal career before being incarcerated in Waukegan.
- Richard B. Vail (1895–1955), member of the U.S. House of Representatives from Illinois's 2nd district during the 80th and 82 U.S. Congresses. He resided at 6946 South Bennett Avenue while a Congressman.
- Charles R. Walgreen, Sr. (1873–1939), businessman who founded Walgreens. He resided at 6912 South Shore Drive in 1928.
- James Watson (1928–2025), scientist and co-author of the paper which deduced the double helix structure of DNA. He was raised at 7922 South Luella Avenue and graduated from South Shore High School.
- Lee Weiner (born 1939), activist and member of the Chicago Seven. He was a childhood resident of South Shore.
- Kanye West (born 1977), rapper. West was raised at 7815 S. South Shore Drive.
- Billy Williams (born 1938), professional baseball player. He purchased a home near East 74th Street and South Constance Avenue in 1966. Williams resided in South Shore until moving to Glen Ellyn, Illinois in 1974.
- Jerald Walker, Guggenheim winning author and National Book Award Finalist
