= 75th Street station =

75th Street station may refer to:

- 75th Street/Grand Crossing station, a Metra station in Chicago on the Metra Electric main line
- 75th Street/Windsor Park station, a Metra station in Chicago on the Metra Electric South Chicago branch
- 75th Street–Elderts Lane station, a New York City Subway station on the J and Z trains
