= South Shore station =

Commuter rail station in Chicago, Illinois

South Shore

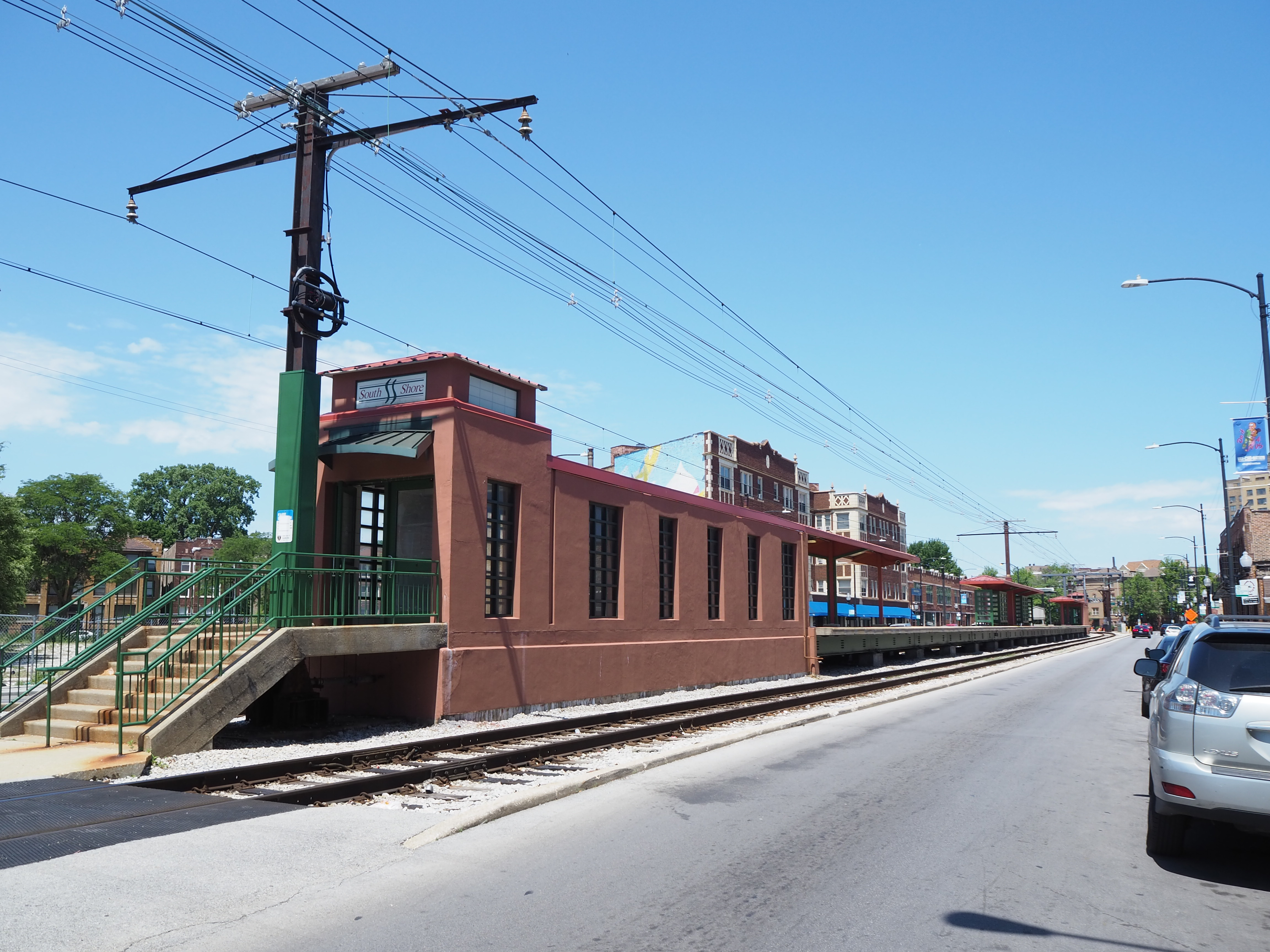

General information
- Location: 71st Street near Yates Boulevard & US 41 (South Shore Drive); South Shore, Chicago, Illinois
- Coordinates: 41.7655°N 87.5659°W
- Owner: Metra
- Line: South Chicago Subdistrict
- Platforms: 1 island platform
- Tracks: 2
- Connections: CTA Bus

Construction
- Parking: Street-side
- Accessible: Yes

Other information
- Fare zone: 2

History
- Rebuilt: 1999
- Electrified: 1926

Passengers
- 2018: 121 (average weekday) ▼33.5%
- Rank: 180 out of 236

Services
Preceding station	Metra	Following station
Bryn Mawr toward Millennium	Metra Electric South Chicago Branch	75th Street/Windsor Park toward South Chicago
Former services
Preceding station	Illinois Central Railroad	Following station
Windsor Park toward 91st Street	Electric Suburban South Chicago Branch	Bryn Mawr toward Randolph Street
Track layout
Location

South Shore station is an electrified commuter rail station along the South Chicago Branch of the Metra Electric District, in the South Shore neighborhood of Chicago. Metra gives the official located at 71st Street near Yates Boulevard and South Shore Drive (U.S. Route 41), however the station is actually located on nearby Exchange Avenue, and is 10.28 miles (16.54 km) away from the northern terminus at Randolph Street Station. In Metra's fare-based system, South Shore Station is in zone 2. As of 2018, South Shore is the 180th busiest of Metra's 236 non-downtown stations, with an average of 121 weekday boardings.

Along with Windsor Park and Cheltenham stations, South Shore Station is one of three that run along the median of Exchange Avenue, just southeast of 71st Street, which contains Stony Island Avenue and Bryn Mawr stations. Limited side-street parking is available for this station along 72nd Street between Exchange Avenue and Yates Boulevard. Bus connections are provided by the Chicago Transit Authority.

== Bus connections ==
CTA

- 6 Jackson Park Express
- 26 South Shore Express (weekdays only)
- 71 71st/South Shore
