= 27th Street station =

Commuter rail station in Chicago, Illinois

27th Street

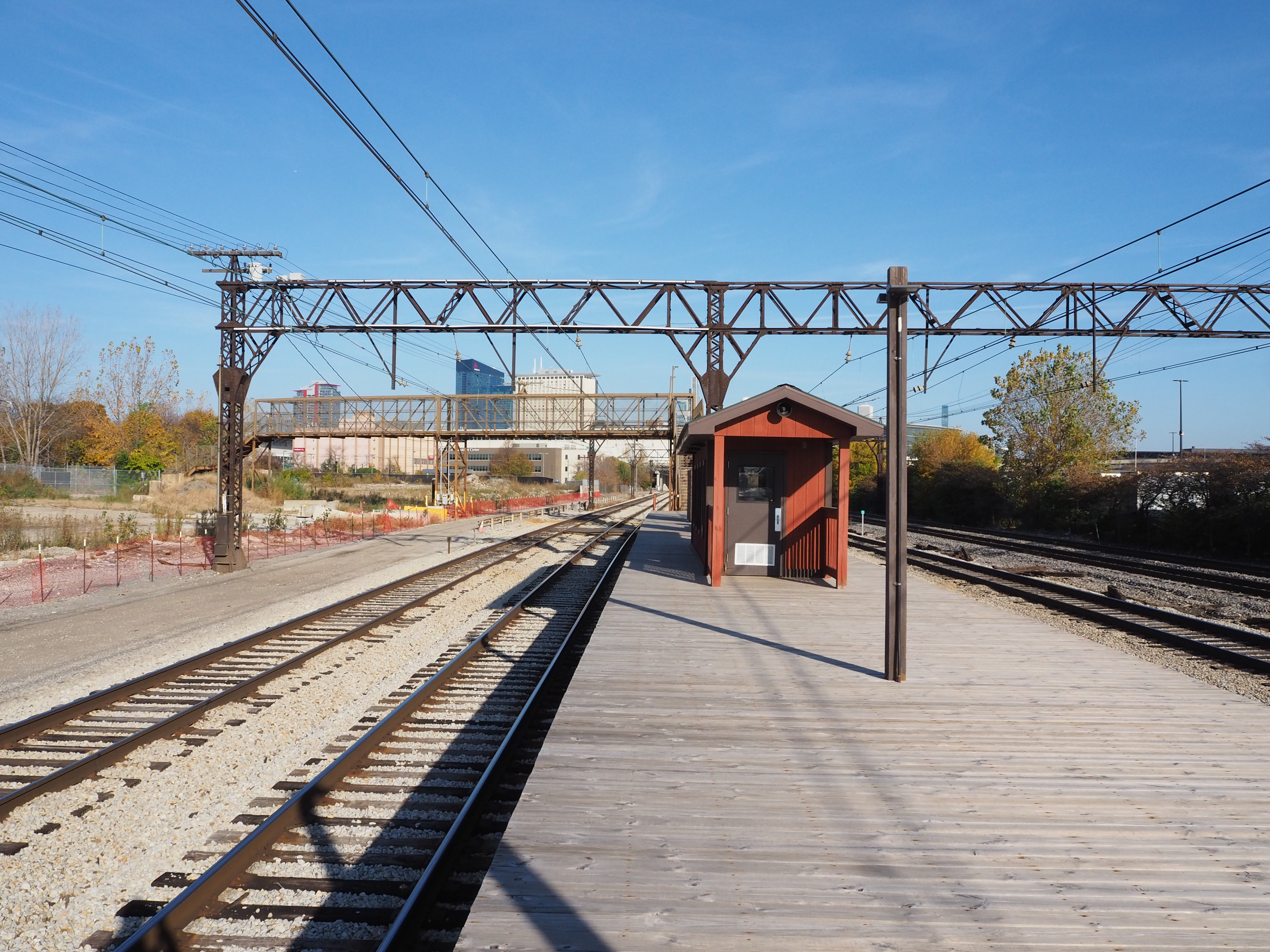
- 27th Street station in November 2024

General information
- Location: 27th Street, East of Ellis Avenue; Douglas, Chicago, IL
- Coordinates: 41.84602°N 87.61412°W
- Owner: Metra
- Line: University Park Sub District
- Platforms: 1 island platform
- Tracks: 4

Construction
- Accessible: No

Other information
- Fare zone: 2

History
- Electrified: 1926

Passengers
- 2018: 12 (average weekday) ▼60%
- Rank: 233 out of 236

Services
Preceding station	Metra	Following station
47th Street/Kenwood toward University Park, South Chicago or Blue Island	Metra Electric	McCormick Place toward Millennium
Former services
Preceding station	Illinois Central Railroad	Following station
31st Street toward Richton, 91st Street or Blue Island	Electric Suburban	23rd Street toward Randolph Street
Track layout
Location

27th Street station is a commuter rail station in the Douglas neighborhood of Chicago that serves the Metra Electric District north to Millennium Station and south to University Park, Blue Island, and South Chicago. As of 2018, 27th Street is Metra's least-used station, with an average of 12 weekday boardings.

The station was originally built by the Illinois Central Railroad (ICRR). It directly served Michael Reese Hospital until the hospital closed in 2008. It was the site of Chicago's worst rail disaster, the 1972 Chicago commuter rail crash.

== Connections ==
CTA buses

- 3 King Drive
- 21 Cermak
