= World's Columbian Exposition Terminal Station =

Temporary train station in Chicago, IL

Terminal Station
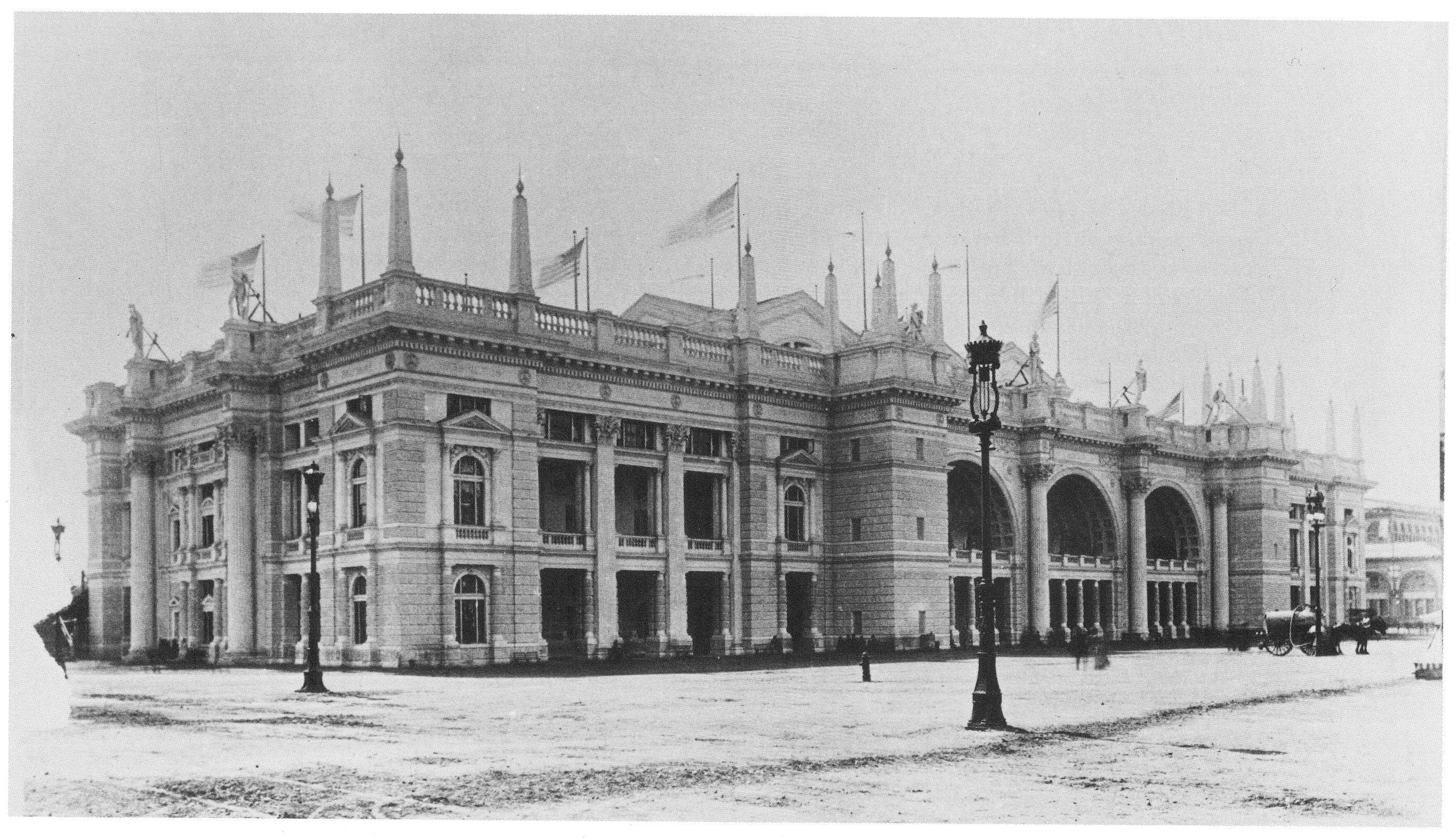

General information
- Location: Jackson Park; Chicago, Illinois
- Coordinates: 41.77504°N 87.58329°W

History
- Opened: 1 May 1893
- Closed: 30 October 1893

Other services
Preceding station	Illinois Central Railroad	Following station
Park Side Terminus	World's Fair branch	Terminus
Preceding station	Baltimore and Ohio Railroad	Following station
Terminus	Main Line World's Fair branch	South Chicago toward Jersey City
Preceding station	Columbian Intramural Railway	Following station
Chicago Junction toward North Loop	Main Line	Colonnade toward South Loop
Location

Terminal station (also referred to as Union Depot on some maps) was a temporary train station serving the World's Columbian Exposition in Chicago, Illinois.

== Gallery ==
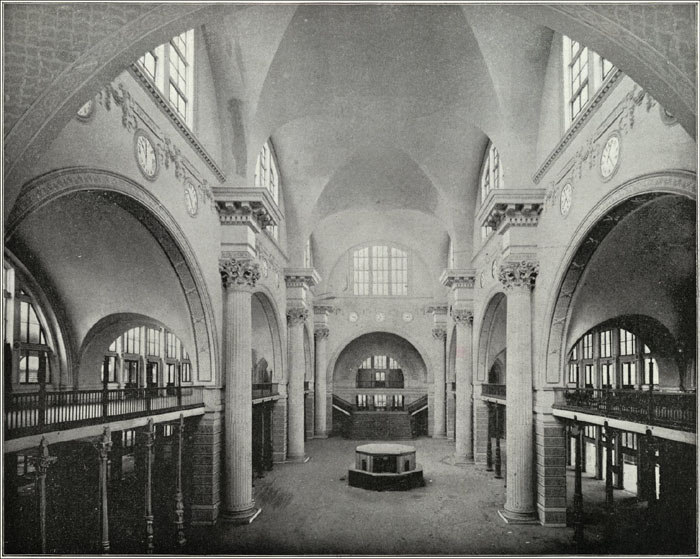
Station interior

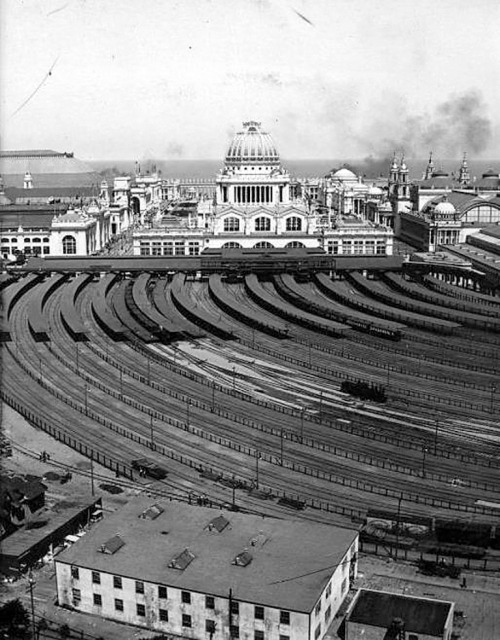
Station platforms
