= Bryn Mawr station (Metra) =

Commuter rail station in Chicago, Illinois

Bryn Mawr

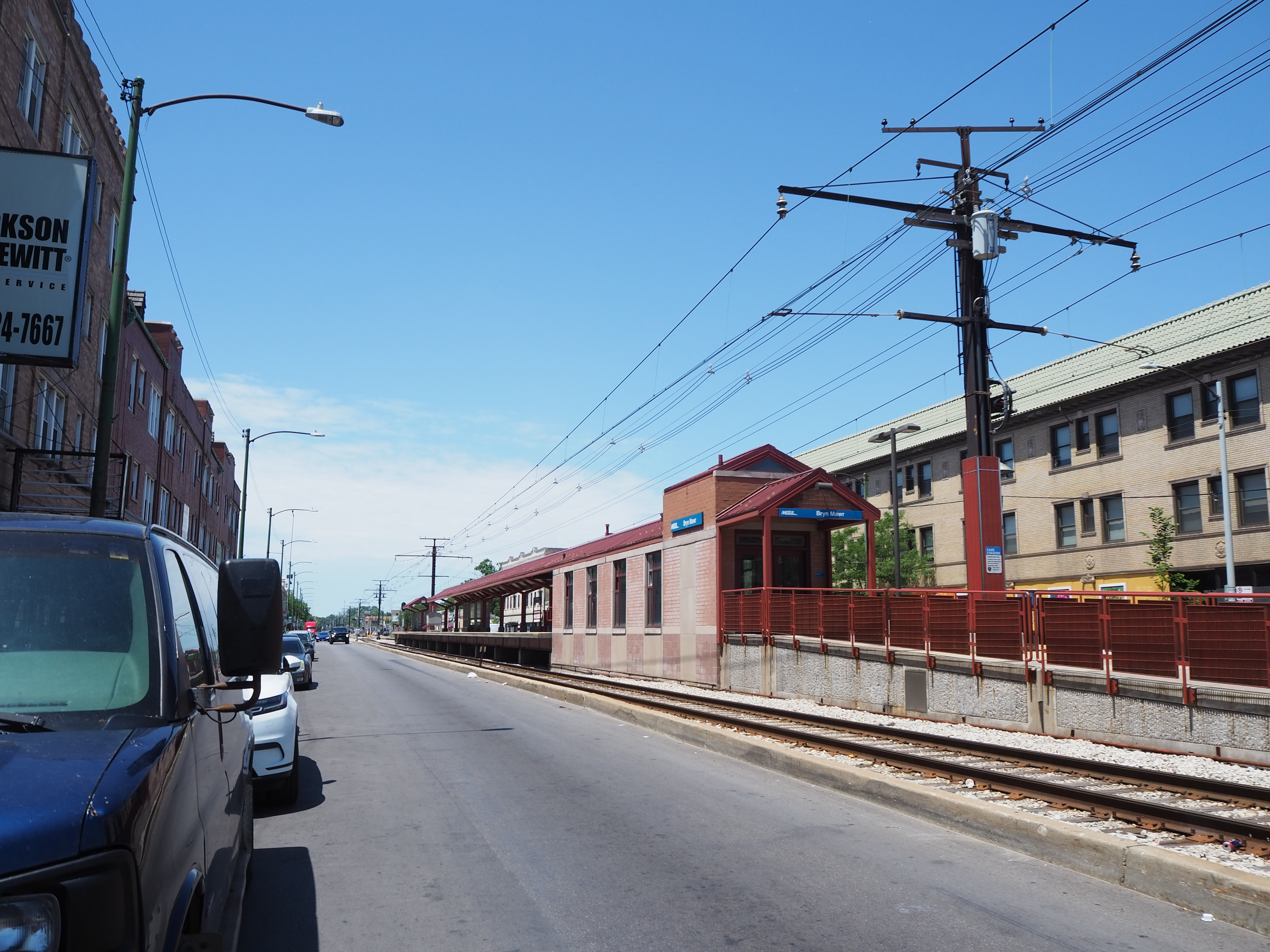

General information
- Location: 71st Street at Jeffery Boulevard; South Shore, Chicago, Illinois
- Coordinates: 41.7661°N 87.5771°W
- Owner: Metra
- Line: South Chicago Subdistrict
- Platforms: 1 island platform
- Tracks: 2
- Connections: CTA Buses

Construction
- Parking: No
- Accessible: Yes

Other information
- Fare zone: 2

History
- Rebuilt: 2006
- Electrified: 1926

Passengers
- 2018: 73 (average weekday) ▼34.8%
- Rank: 201 out of 236

Services
Preceding station	Metra	Following station
Stony Island toward Millennium	Metra Electric South Chicago Branch	South Shore toward South Chicago
Former services
Preceding station	Illinois Central Railroad	Following station
South Shore toward 91st Street	Electric Suburban South Chicago Branch	Stony Island Avenue toward Randolph Street
Track layout
Location

Bryn Mawr (better known as 71st and Jeffery) is a station on the Hyde Park/South Chicago branch of the Metra Electric District. It is located at 71st Street and Jeffery Boulevard, which is 9.66 miles (15.55 km) away from the northern terminus at Randolph Street Station. In Metra's fare-based system, Bryn Mawr Station is in zone 2. As of 2018, Bryn Mawr is the 201st busiest of Metra's 236 non-downtown stations, with an average of 73 weekday boardings. The station is named for the former name of the neighborhood at the time the line was built, when it was part of Hyde Park Township.

Along with Stony Island Avenue station, Bryn Mawr is one of two stations that run along the median of 71st Street. South Shore station is located just southeast of that end of that median. No parking lots are available for this station, but there are bus connections provided by the Chicago Transit Authority.

== Bus connections ==
CTA

- N5 South Shore Night Bus (Owl Service – overnight only)
- J14 Jeffery Jump
- 15 Jeffery Local
- 71 71st/South Shore
