= 83rd Street/South Chicago station =

Commuter rail station in Chicago, Illinois

83rd Street/South Chicago

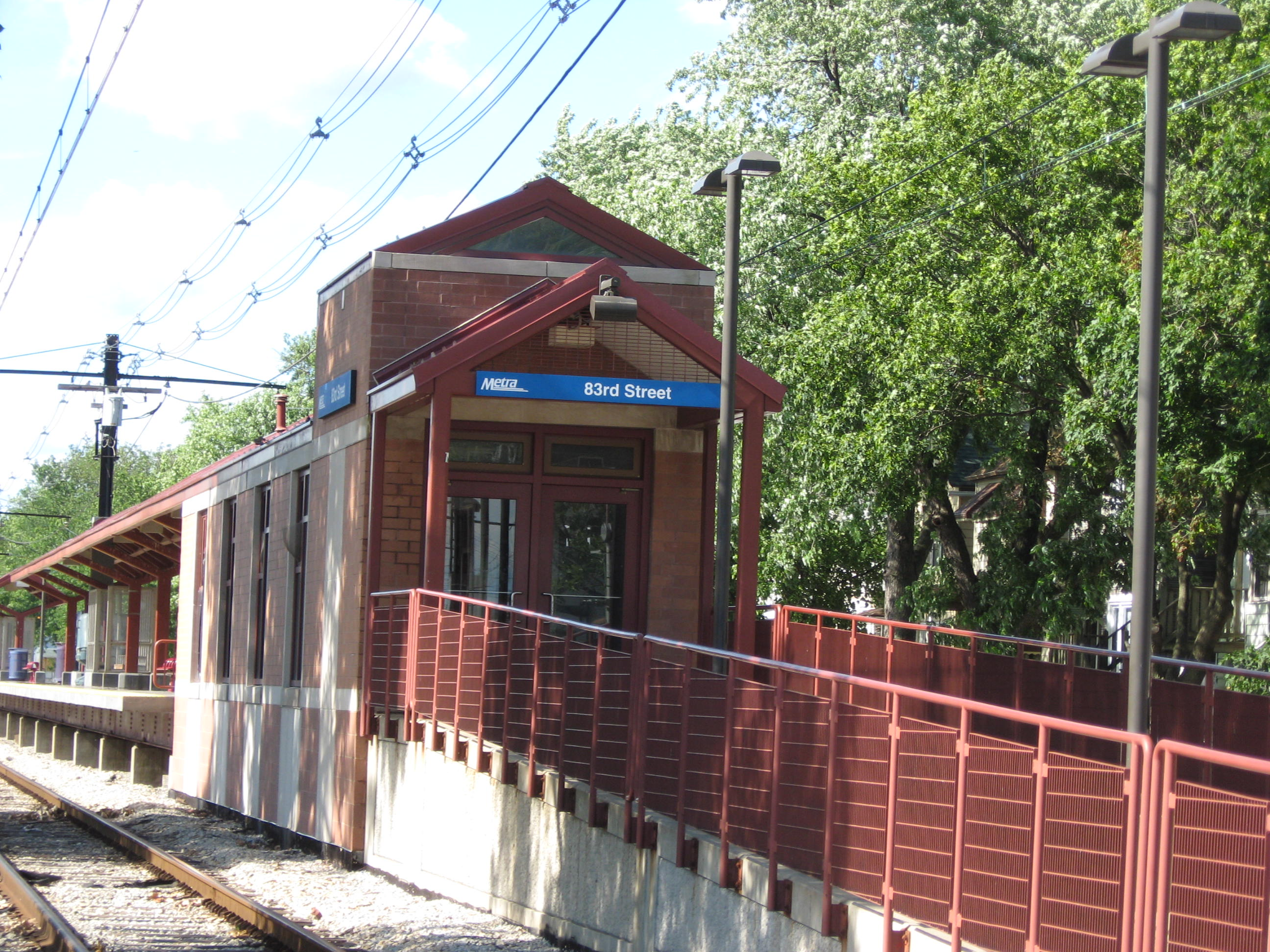
- 83rd Street/South Chicago station

General information
- Location: 83rd Street and Commercial Avenue; South Chicago, Chicago, Illinois
- Coordinates: 41.7447972°N 87.5514129°W
- Owner: Metra
- Line: South Chicago Subdistrict
- Platforms: 1 island platform
- Tracks: 2
- Connections: CTA Bus

Construction
- Structure type: Closed-sheltered platform
- Parking: Yes
- Accessible: Yes

Other information
- Fare zone: 2

History
- Electrified: 1926

Passengers
- 2018: 74 (average weekday) ▼28.2%
- Rank: 200 out of 236

Services
Preceding station	Metra	Following station
79th Street/Cheltenham toward Millennium	Metra Electric South Chicago Branch	87th Street/South Chicago toward 93rd Street
Former services
Preceding station	Illinois Central Railroad	Following station
87th Street toward 91st Street	Electric Suburban South Chicago Branch	79th Street toward Randolph Street
Track layout
Location

83rd Street/South Chicago station is an electrified commuter rail station along the South Chicago Branch of the Metra Electric District on the South Side of the city of Chicago. The station is located on 83rd Street at Commercial Avenue near Russell Square Park, and is 11.97 miles (19.26 km) away from the northern terminus, Millennium Station. In Metra's zone-based fare system, 83rd Street is in zone 2. As of 2018, 83rd Street is the 200th busiest of Metra's 236 non-downtown stations, with an average of 74 weekday boardings.

West of this station is another Metra Electric station along 83rd Street known as 83rd Street/Avalon Park along the Main Branch. Station-side and on-street parking are available next to the 83rd Street railroad crossing. South of the station, the line curves southeast onto another abandoned railroad right-of-way as it heads towards 93rd Street station in South Chicago.

== Bus connections ==
CTA

- N5 South Shore Night Bus (Owl Service – overnight only)
- 26 South Shore Express (weekdays only)
- 71 71st/South Shore
