= 75th Street/Windsor Park station =

Commuter rail station in Chicago, Illinois

75th/Windsor Park

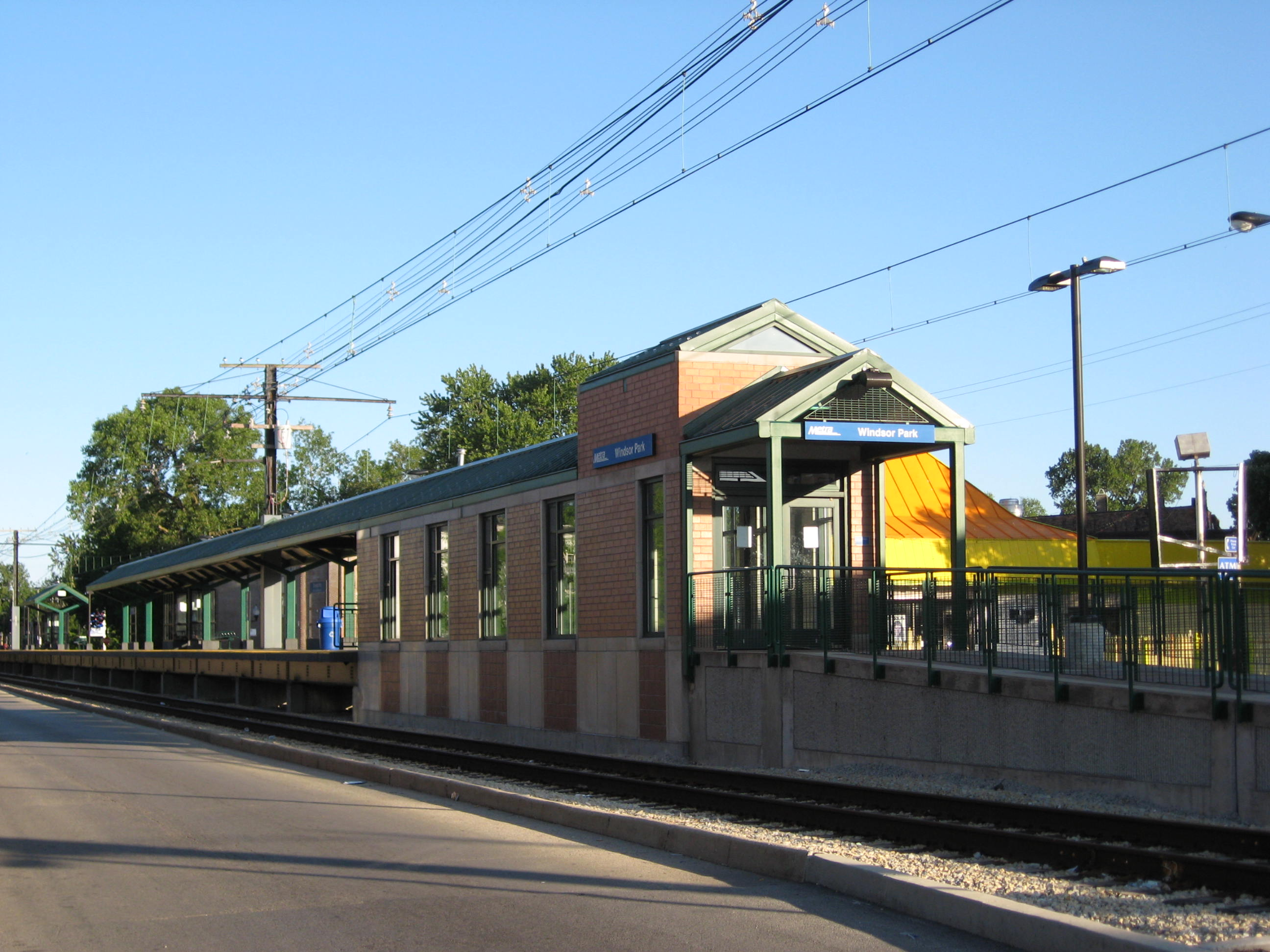
- Windsor Park Metra station

General information
- Location: 75th Street & Exchange Avenue; South Shore, Chicago, Illinois
- Coordinates: 41.7585°N 87.5595°W
- Owner: Metra
- Line: South Chicago Subdistrict
- Platforms: 1 island platform
- Tracks: 2
- Connections: CTA Buses

Construction
- Parking: Street-side
- Accessible: Yes

Other information
- Fare zone: 2

History
- Rebuilt: 2008
- Electrified: 1926

Passengers
- 2018: 68 (average weekday) ▼28.4%
- Rank: 202 out of 236

Services
Preceding station	Metra	Following station
South Shore toward Millennium	Metra Electric South Chicago Branch	79th Street/Cheltenham toward South Chicago
Former services
Preceding station	Illinois Central Railroad	Following station
79th Street toward 91st Street	Electric Suburban South Chicago Branch	South Shore toward Randolph Street
Track layout
Location

75th Street/Windsor Park station is a station on the South Chicago Branch of the Metra Electric District Line. It is located at 75th Street in the median of Exchange Avenue and is 10.88 miles (17.51 km) away from the northern terminus at Millennium Station. In Metra's zone-based fare system, Windsor Park Station is in Zone 2. As of 2018, Windsor Park is the 202nd busiest of Metra's 236 non-downtown stations, with an average of 68 weekday boardings.

Part of 75th Street-Windsor Park station's name is also shared with another 75th Street Metra Electric station at Grand Crossing on the main line. Parking is available along northbound Exchange Avenue between 75th Place and 75th Street and along both sides of Saginaw Avenue, south of southbound Exchange Avenue. The station was renovated in 2008.

== Bus connections ==
CTA

- N5 South Shore Night Bus (Owl Service – overnight only)
- 71 71st/South Shore
- 75 74th/75th
