= Stony Island station =

Commuter rail station in Chicago, Illinois

Stony Island

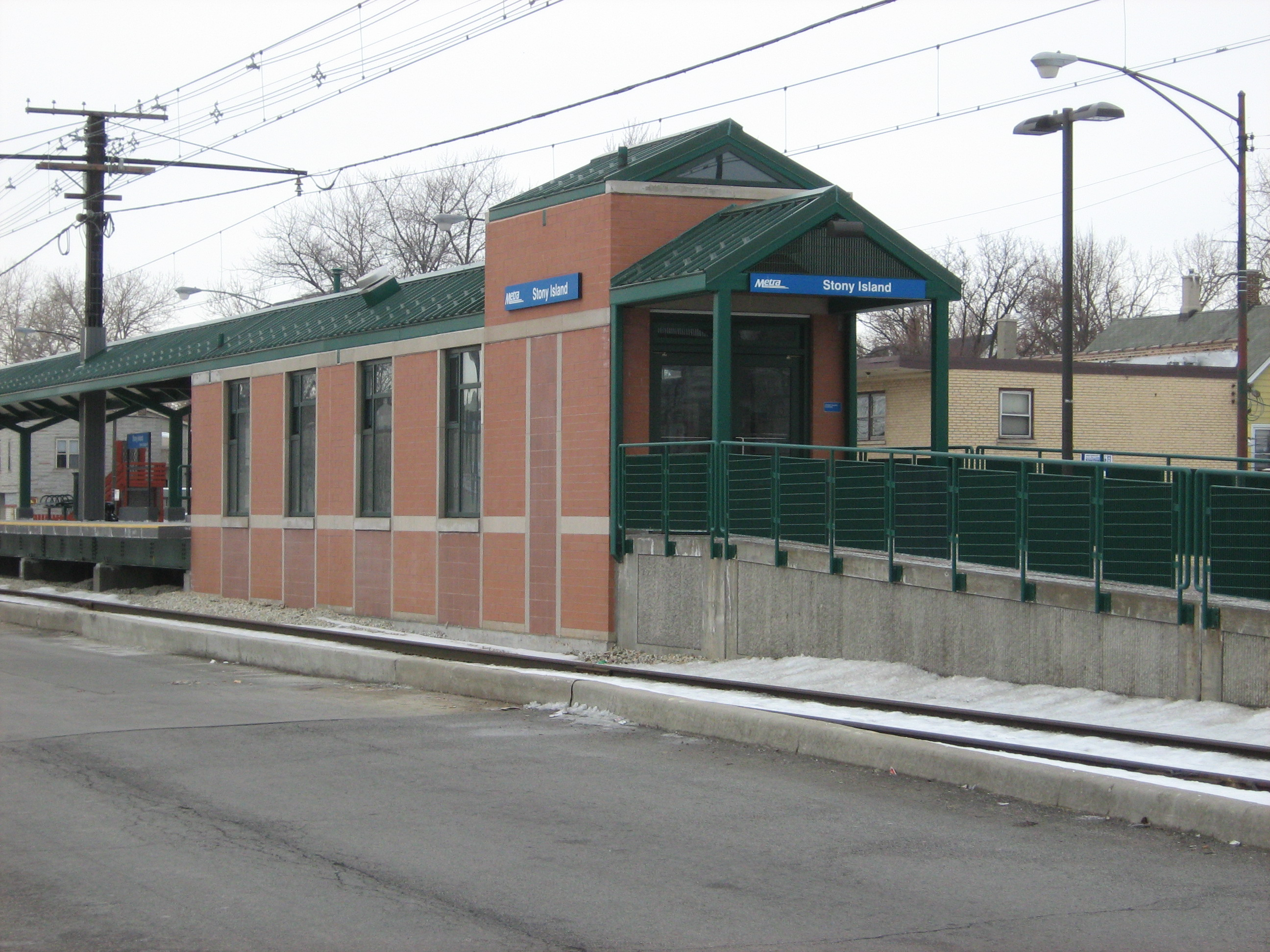
- Stony Island Metra Electric station as seen from eastbound 71st Street.

General information
- Location: 71st Street and Stony Island Avenue; South Shore, Chicago, Illinois
- Coordinates: 41.7661°N 87.5872°W
- Owner: Metra
- Line: South Chicago Subdistrict
- Platforms: 1 island platform
- Tracks: 2
- Connections: CTA Bus

Construction
- Parking: No
- Accessible: Yes

Other information
- Fare zone: 2

History
- Electrified: 1926

Passengers
- 2018: 99 (average weekday) ▼9.2%
- Rank: 189 out of 236

Services
Preceding station	Metra	Following station
63rd Street toward Millennium	Metra Electric South Chicago Branch	Bryn Mawr toward South Chicago
Former services
Preceding station	Illinois Central Railroad	Following station
Bryn Mawr toward 91st Street	Electric Suburban South Chicago Branch	67th Street toward Randolph Street
Terminus	World's Fair branch	Terminal Terminus
Track layout
Location

Stony Island station is the first electrified commuter rail station on the South Chicago Branch of the Metra Electric District, on 71st Street west of the intersection with Stony Island Avenue, 9.10 miles (14.65 km) from the northern terminus at Randolph Street Station. In Metra's fare-based system, Stony Island is in zone 2. As of 2018, Stony Island is the 189th busiest of Metra's 236 non-downtown stations, with an average of 99 weekday boardings.

Along with Bryn Mawr, Stony Island is one of two stations that run along the median of 71st Street. South Shore station is just southeast of that end of that median. No parking lots are available at the station; bus connections are provided by the Chicago Transit Authority.

The station is mentioned in Robert A. Heinlein's 1942 novella The Unpleasant Profession of Jonathan Hoag.

== Bus connections ==
CTA

- 28 Stony Island
- 71 71st/South Shore
