= Stony Island Avenue =

Major north-south street in Chicago, Illinois, U.S.

- 1600 East
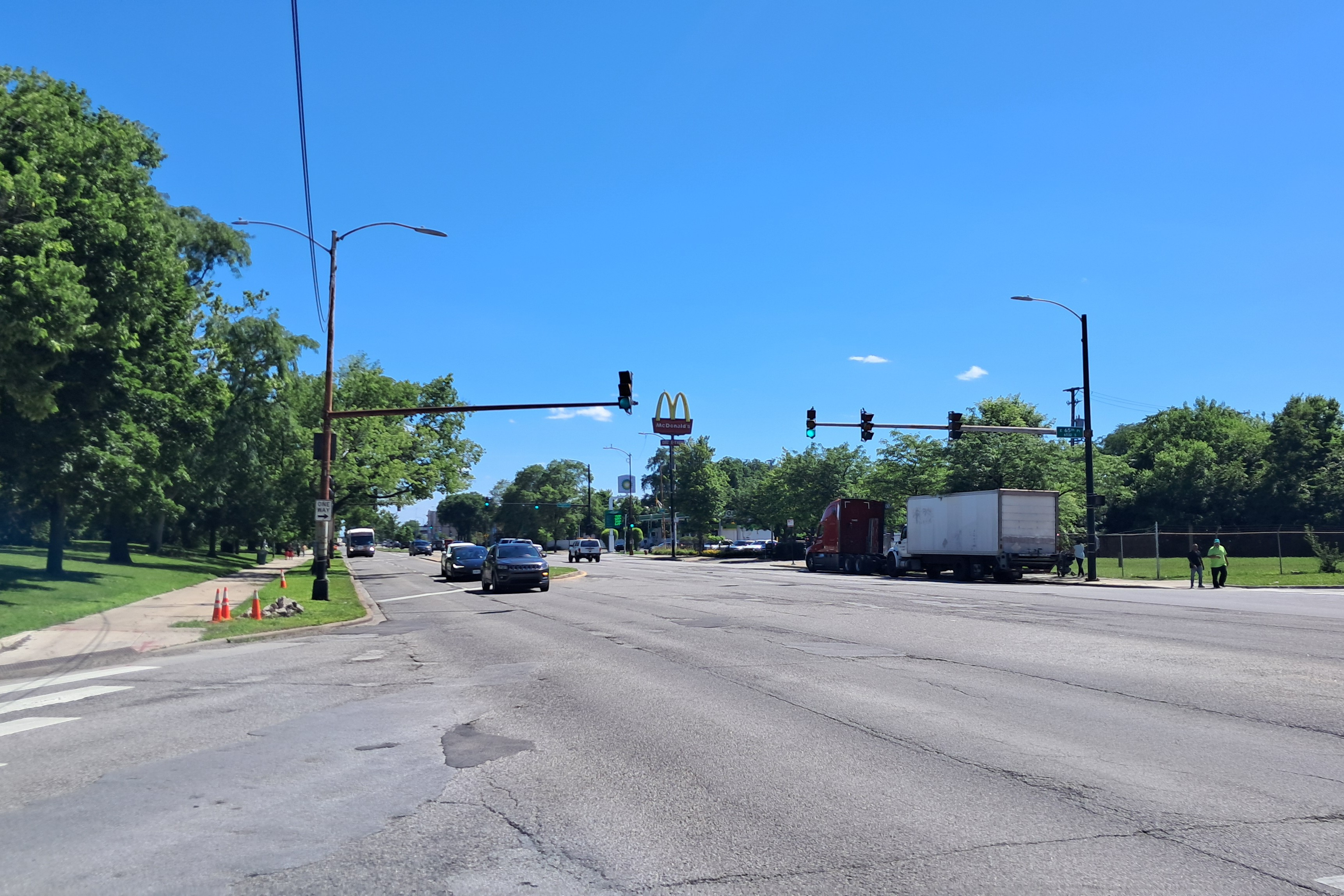
- Stony Island Avenue at 65th Place and Cornell Drive, June 2026
- Interactive map of Stony Island Avenue
- Location: Chicago
- South end: County Line Road at the Will / Kankakee County border
- North end: 56th Street (5600 South)

Stony Island Avenue is a major street on South Side of the city of Chicago, designated 1600 East in Chicago's street numbering system. It runs from 56th Street south to the Calumet River. Stony Island Avenue continues sporadically south of the Calumet in the southern suburbs, running alongside the Bishop Ford Freeway, sometimes as a frontage road. It terminates at County Line Road on the border of Will and Kankakee Counties.

== Route description ==
Running roughly parallel to the Illinois Central Railroad, Stony Island Avenue forms the western boundary of Jackson Park, former home of the World's Columbian Exposition of 1893 and current home of the Museum of Science and Industry. Buildings of the University of Chicago line its western side, as does the national headquarters of the historically black Alpha Kappa Alpha sorority. Between 59th and 60th streets the Midway Plaisance runs westward to connect Jackson Park to Washington Park a mile away. Shortly after leaving the Hyde Park neighborhood sits Hyde Park Career Academy at 63rd Street. The Barack Obama Presidential Center is situated across the high school.

Stony Island becomes an extremely wide thoroughfare between 67th and 94th streets. At 71st Street there is a Metra Electric District Stony Island Avenue station. Just south of 71st was the famous Moo & Oink Grocery Store that closed its doors in 2011. At 73rd Street is the Nation of Islam's Mosque Maryam. At 75th Street is Jackson Park Hospital. Stony Island meets 79th Street, and South Chicago Avenue forming a major and large intersection, with the ramps of the Chicago Skyway overhead. Adjacent to this intersection on 79th Street is the New Regal Theater famous as The Avalon, a Chicago Landmark.

At about 92nd Street, Stony Island passes to the west of the geographical feature for which it was named, a stony hill that was once an island when the glacial Lake Chicago covered the area thousands of years ago. Early pioneers gave this hill—located in the present day neighborhood of Calumet Heights, Chicago (also referred to as Pill Hill for the large number of doctors who used to live in the area), at 41°43′42″N 87°34′47″W—the name Stony Island because at a distance it looked like an island set in a tractless prairie sea. (See also the nearby Blue Island.) At the intersection with 93rd Street is the Bronzeville Children's Museum. It is the only African-American children's museum in the U.S. South of 103rd Street, Stony Island Ave. enters the heavily industrialized region of Lake Calumet.

At some points in the south suburbs, street signs for Stony Island Avenue are misspelled as Stoney Island Avenue.

=== Expressway ===
Interstate 494
- Location: Chicago, Illinois
- Existed: 1950s–1966

Between 103rd Street and the US 12 / US 20 (95th Street), there is a significant gap in the road. This gap is filled by the Stony Island Avenue expressway, which runs for approximately two miles (three kilometers) between I-94 (Bishop Ford Freeway) and 95th Street. At its northern end, the road reverts to at-grade status.

During the 1960s, the expressway was to have been the southern terminus of I-494, which also would have included an upgraded Lake Shore Drive in its routing. This plan was abandoned in 1966 as the I-494 designation was moved to the now-canceled Crosstown Expressway.

==== Exit list ====
The entire route is in Chicago, Cook County. All exits are unnumbered.

mi	km	Destinations	Notes
0.00	0.00	I-94 east (Bishop Ford Freeway) – Indiana	Southern terminus of the Stony Island Avenue expressway; I-94 west exit 65
0.8	1.3	103rd Street	
1.3	2.1	I-94 west (Bishop Ford Freeway) to I-57 south – Wisconsin, Memphis	I-94 east exit 65; northbound access via 103rd Street interchange
1.9	3.1	US 12 / US 20 (95th Street)	At-grade intersection; northern terminus of the Stony Island Avenue expressway; road continues as Stony Island Avenue
1.000 mi = 1.609 km; 1.000 km = 0.621 mi

== Transportation ==
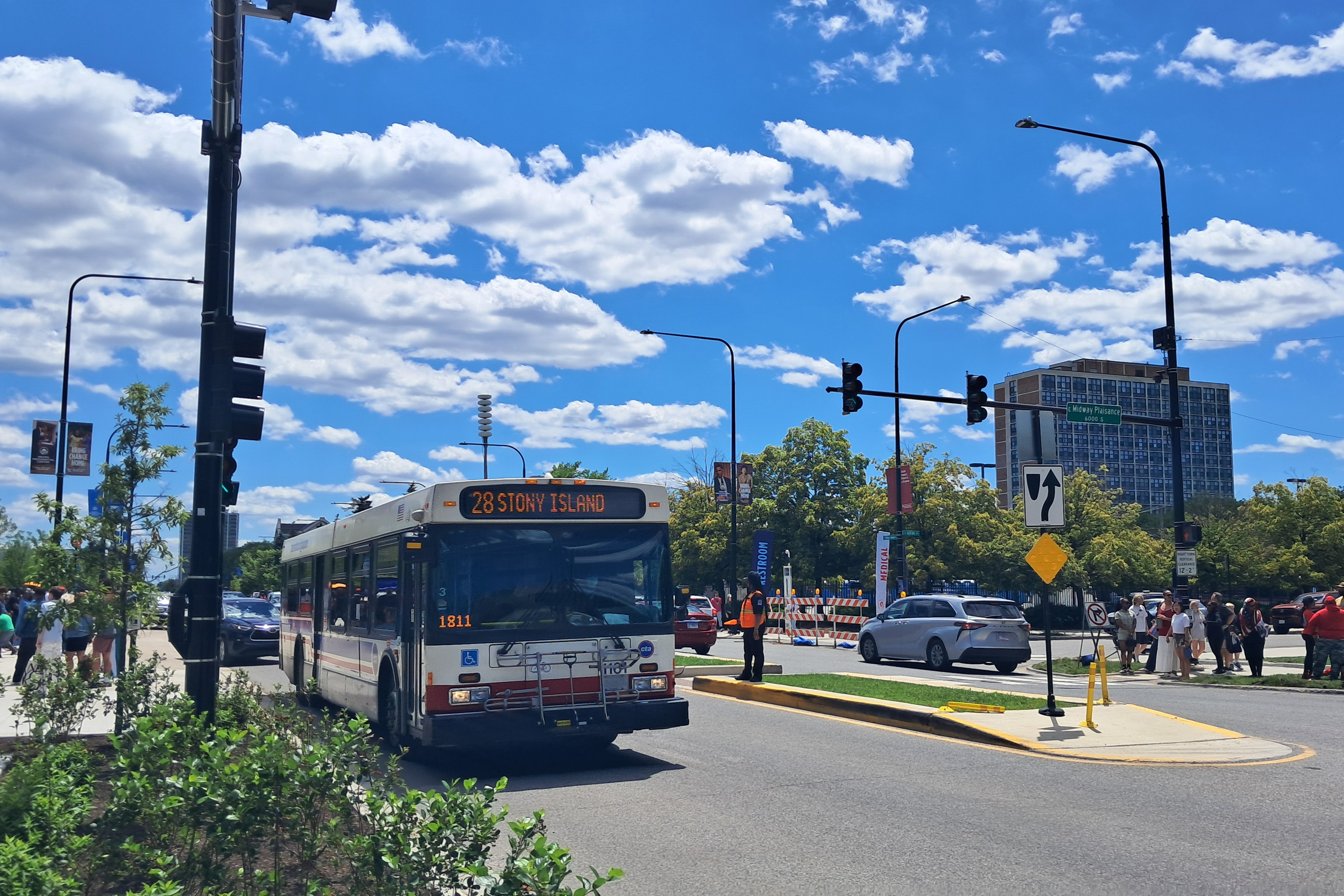
CTA route 28 bus at Midway Plaisance

Stony Island Avenue is primarily served by 28 Stony Island, running from the 103rd Street bus garage, providing a transfer to other bus routes (including Pace bus route 353), to a bus turnaround at 47th Street/Lake Park Avenue near a Metra station. On weekdays, route 28 buses may begin/end at Olive–Harvey College; during weekday rush hours, buses may travel through Lake Shore Drive and downtown toward Chicago Union Station.

CTA bus routes 2 (Hyde Park Express), N5 (South Shore Night Bus), 6 (Jackson Park Express), 15 (Jeffery Local), 95 (95th), and Pace bus route 353 run along the road in short segments. At 71st Street, the Stony Island station on the South Chicago branch of the Metra Electric serves Stony Island Avenue.
