= 87th Street/South Chicago station =

Commuter rail station in Chicago, Illinois

87th Street/South Chicago

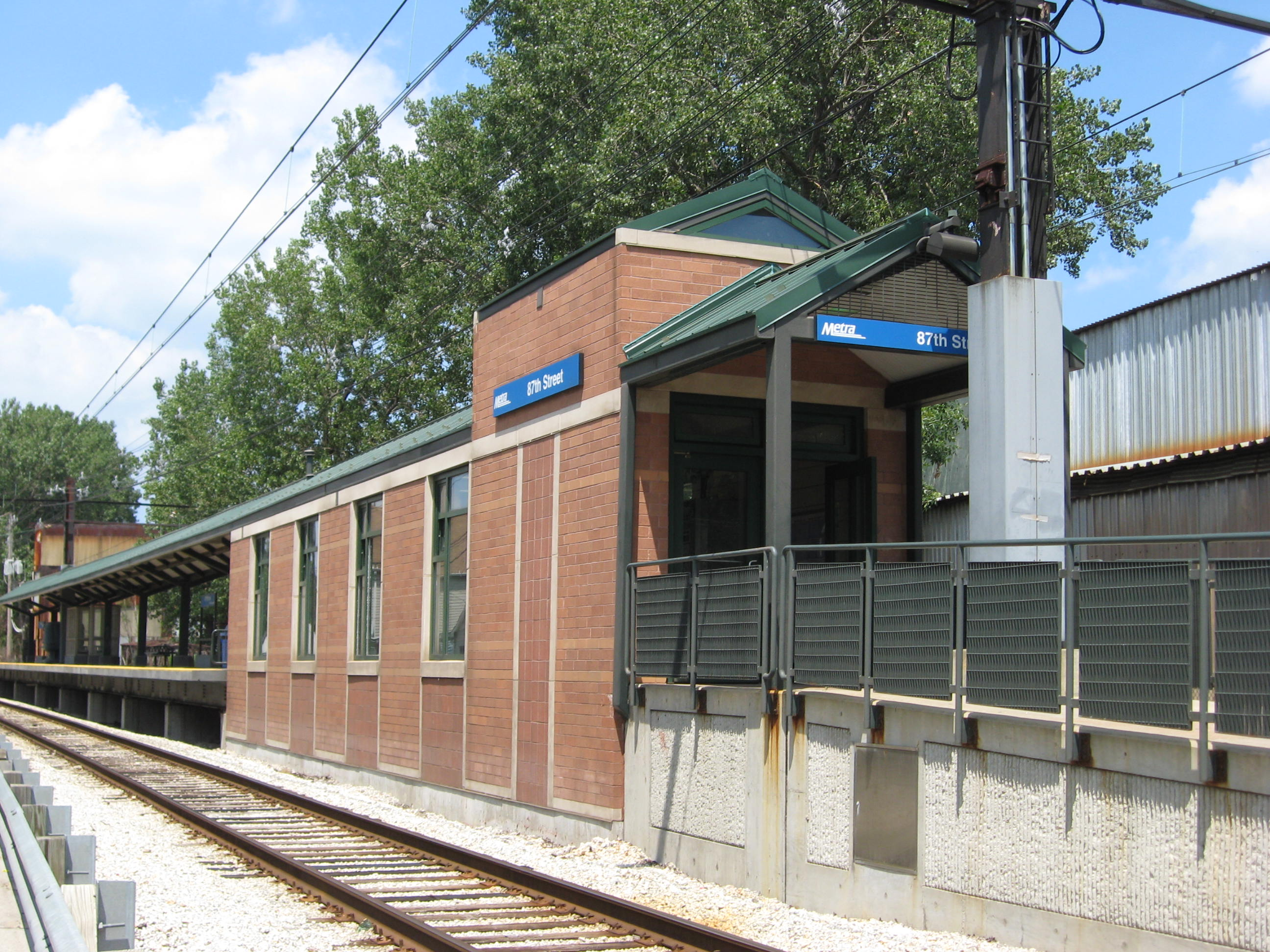
- 87th Street/South Chicago station from the alley north of the East 87th Street grade crossing

General information
- Location: 87th Street, east of Commercial Avenue; South Chicago, Chicago, Illinois
- Coordinates: 41.7379°N 87.5482°W
- Owner: Metra
- Line: South Chicago Subdistrict
- Platforms: 1 Island platform
- Tracks: 2
- Connections: CTA Bus

Construction
- Structure type: Closed-sheltered platform
- Parking: Yes; street-side
- Accessible: Yes

Other information
- Fare zone: 2

History
- Electrified: 1926

Passengers
- 2018: 106 (average weekday) ▲17.8%
- Rank: 186 out of 236

Services
Preceding station	Metra	Following station
83rd Street/South Chicago toward Millennium	Metra Electric South Chicago Branch	93rd Street Terminus
Former services
Preceding station	Illinois Central Railroad	Following station
91st Street Terminus	Electric Suburban South Chicago Branch	83rd Street toward Randolph Street
Track layout
Location

87th Street station is a station on the South Chicago Branch of the Metra Electric District on the southeast side of Chicago, United States. The station is located at 87th Street, two block East of Commercial Avenue, and is 12.51 miles (20.13 km) away from the northern terminus, Millennium Station. In Metra's zone-based fare system, 87th Street is in zone 2. As of 2018, 87th Street is the 186th busiest of Metra's 236 non-downtown stations, with an average of 106 weekday boardings.

Though Metra gives the address for the station as being at 87th Street east of Commercial Avenue, it is actually closer to South Baltimore Avenue. The tracks run along the east side of a one-lane alley behind South Baltimore Avenue, which spans only from 86th Street to 87th Street.

West of this station is another Metra Electric station along 87th Street known as 87th Street (Woodruff) along the main line. Parking is available at this station, but only street-side along 87th Street, on the south side between Houston and Burley Avenues, and on the north side between the tracks and Baltimore Avenue.

== Bus connections ==
CTA

- 87 87th
