= 47th Street/Kenwood station =

Commuter rail station in Chicago, Illinois

47th Street/Kenwood

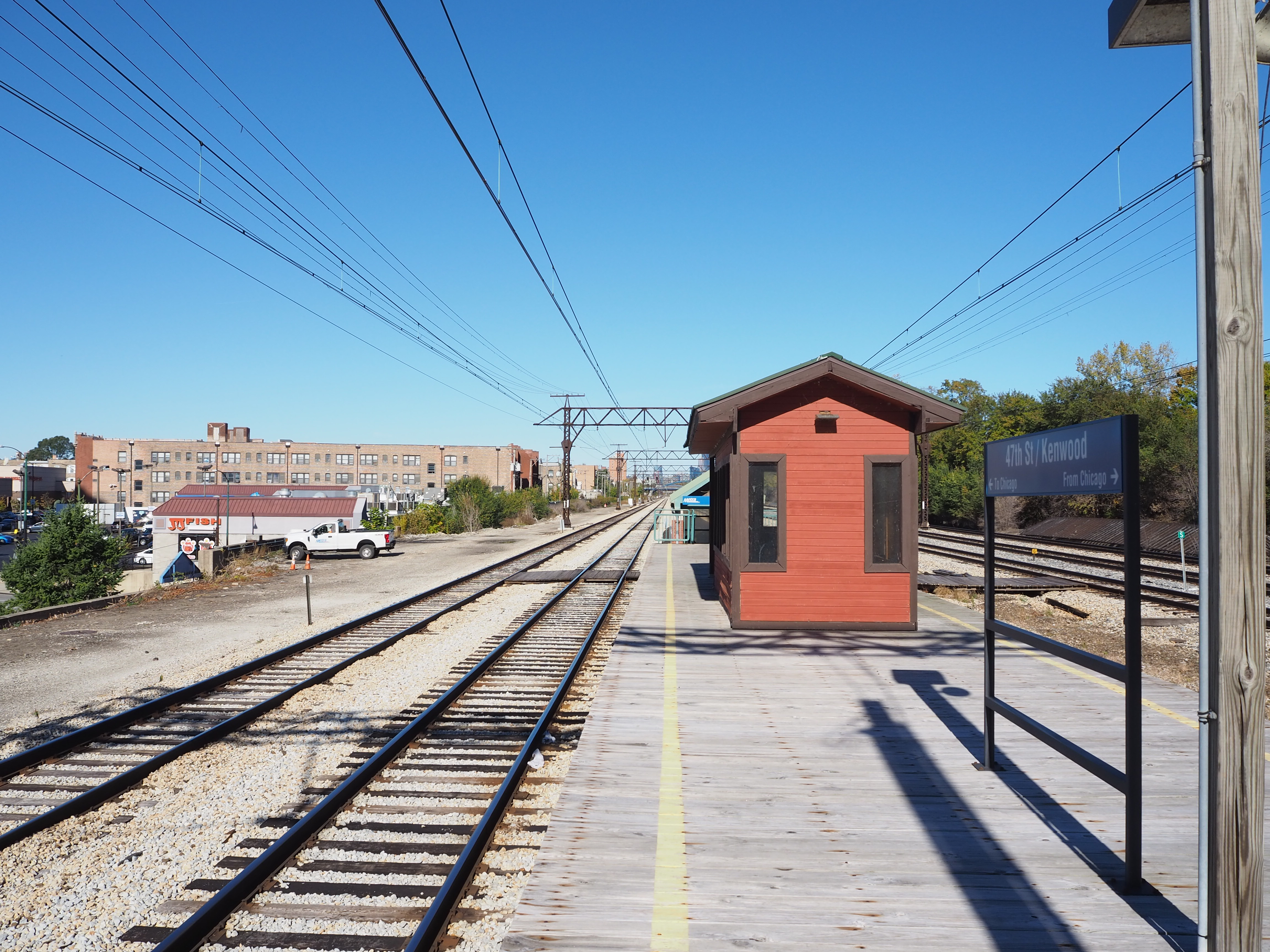
- 47th Street/Kenwood station in October 2024

General information
- Location: 47th Street near Lake Park Avenue; Kenwood, Chicago, Illinois
- Coordinates: 41.80987°N 87.59138°W
- Owner: Metra
- Line: University Park Sub District
- Platforms: 1 island platform
- Tracks: 4
- Connections: CTA Bus

Construction
- Accessible: No

Other information
- Fare zone: 2

History
- Electrified: 1926
- Former names: Kenwood

Passengers
- 2018: 94 (average weekday) ▲14.6%
- Rank: 191 out of 236

Services
| Preceding station | Metra | Following station |
|---|---|---|
| 51st/53rd Street toward University Park, South Chicago or Blue Island | Metra Electric | 27th Street toward Millennium |
Former services
| Preceding station | Illinois Central Railroad | Following station |
|---|---|---|
| 53rd Street toward Richton, 91st Street or Blue Island | Electric Suburban | 43rd Street toward Randolph Street |
Track layout
Location

47th Street/Kenwood is a commuter rail station within the city of Chicago that serves the Metra Electric District north to Millennium Station and south to University Park, Blue Island, Illinois, and the neighborhood of South Chicago. As of 2018, the station is the 191st busiest of Metra's 236 non-downtown stations, with an average of 94 weekday boardings. Passengers can only exit the train from the first car. The first station at this location was originally built by the Illinois Central Railroad (ICRR).

== Bus connections ==
CTA

- 2 Hyde Park Express
- 6 Jackson Park Express
- 28 Stony Island
- 47 47th
