= 79th Street/Cheltenham station =

Commuter rail station in Chicago, Illinois

79th Street/Cheltenham

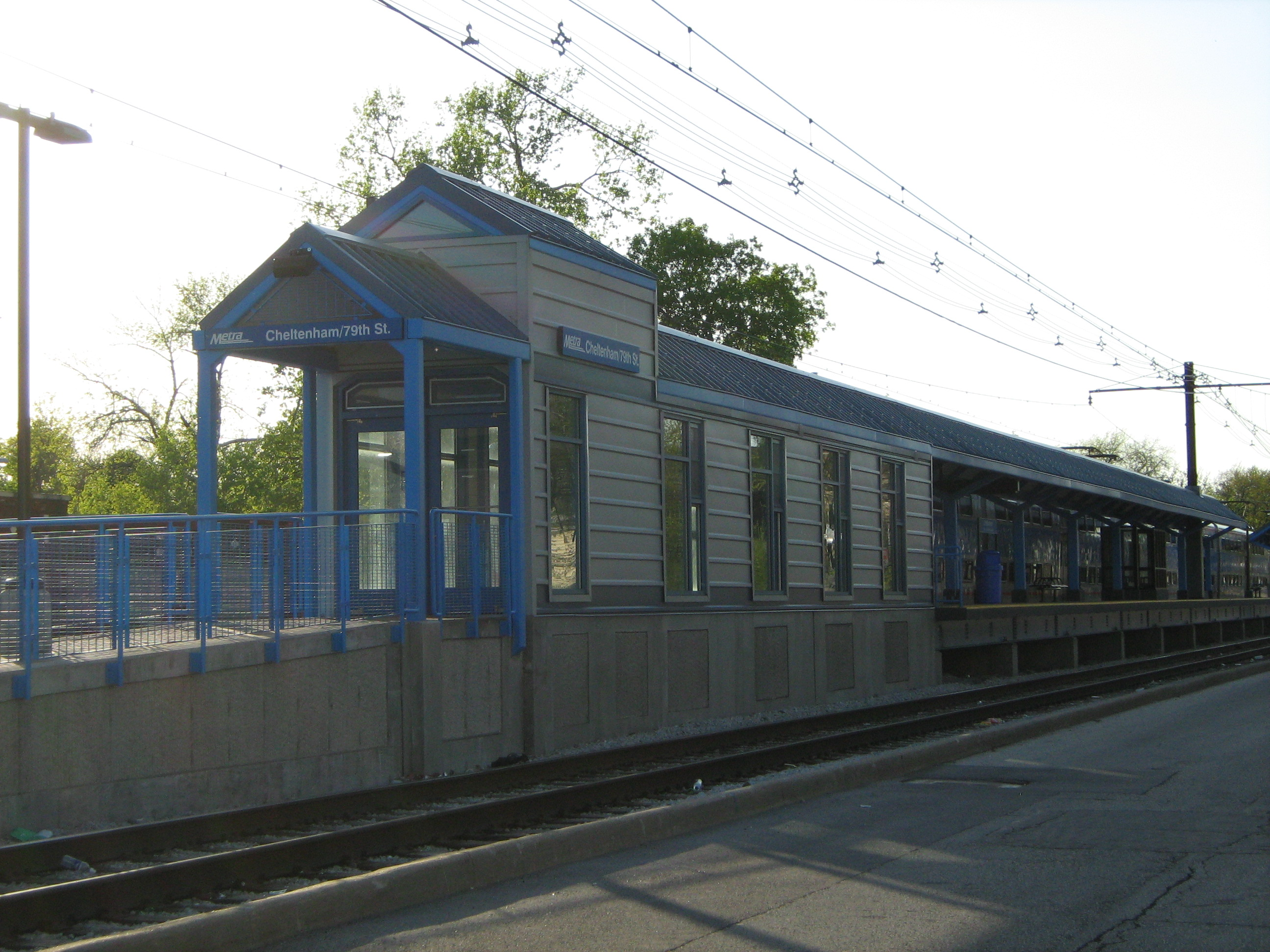
- 79th Street/Cheltenham Metra Electric station as seen from northbound Exchange Avenue

General information
- Location: 79th Street & Exchange Avenue; South Shore, Chicago, Illinois
- Coordinates: 41.7521°N 87.5527°W
- Owner: Metra
- Line: South Chicago Subdistrict
- Platforms: 1 island platform
- Tracks: 2

Construction
- Parking: Street-side
- Accessible: Yes

Other information
- Fare zone: 2

History
- Rebuilt: 2008
- Electrified: 1926

Passengers
- 2018: 47 (average weekday) ▼14.5%
- Rank: 213 out of 236

Services
Preceding station	Metra	Following station
75th Street/Windsor Park toward Millennium	Metra Electric South Chicago Branch	83rd Street/South Chicago toward 93rd Street
Former services
Preceding station	Illinois Central Railroad	Following station
83rd Street toward 91st Street	Electric Suburban South Chicago Branch	Windsor Park toward Randolph Street
Track layout
Location

79th Street/Cheltenham is a station on the Hyde Park/South Chicago branch of the Metra Electric District. The station is located along the median of Exchange Avenue, approximately one city block north of East 79th Street, and is 11.49 miles (18.49 km) away from the northern terminus at Millennium Station. As of 2018, Cheltenham is the 213th busiest of Metra's 236 non-downtown stations, with an average of 47 weekday boardings.

West of this station is another Metra Electric station along 79th Street known as 79th Street/Chatham along the Main Branch. Street-side parking is available only on Cheltenham Place, which also intersects with 79th Street and Northbound Exchange Avenue. The station was recently renovated in 2008 as part of Metra's redevelopment program for the South Chicago branch.

According to a 2014 study commissioned by the Regional Transportation Authority, the Cheltenham station is an urban neighborhood station. The surrounding area of such stations is predominantly residential with greater density and some commercial near the station.

== Bus connections ==
CTA

- 79 79th (Owl Service)
