= Metra Electric District =

Electric commuter rail line in Chicago, Illinois, USA

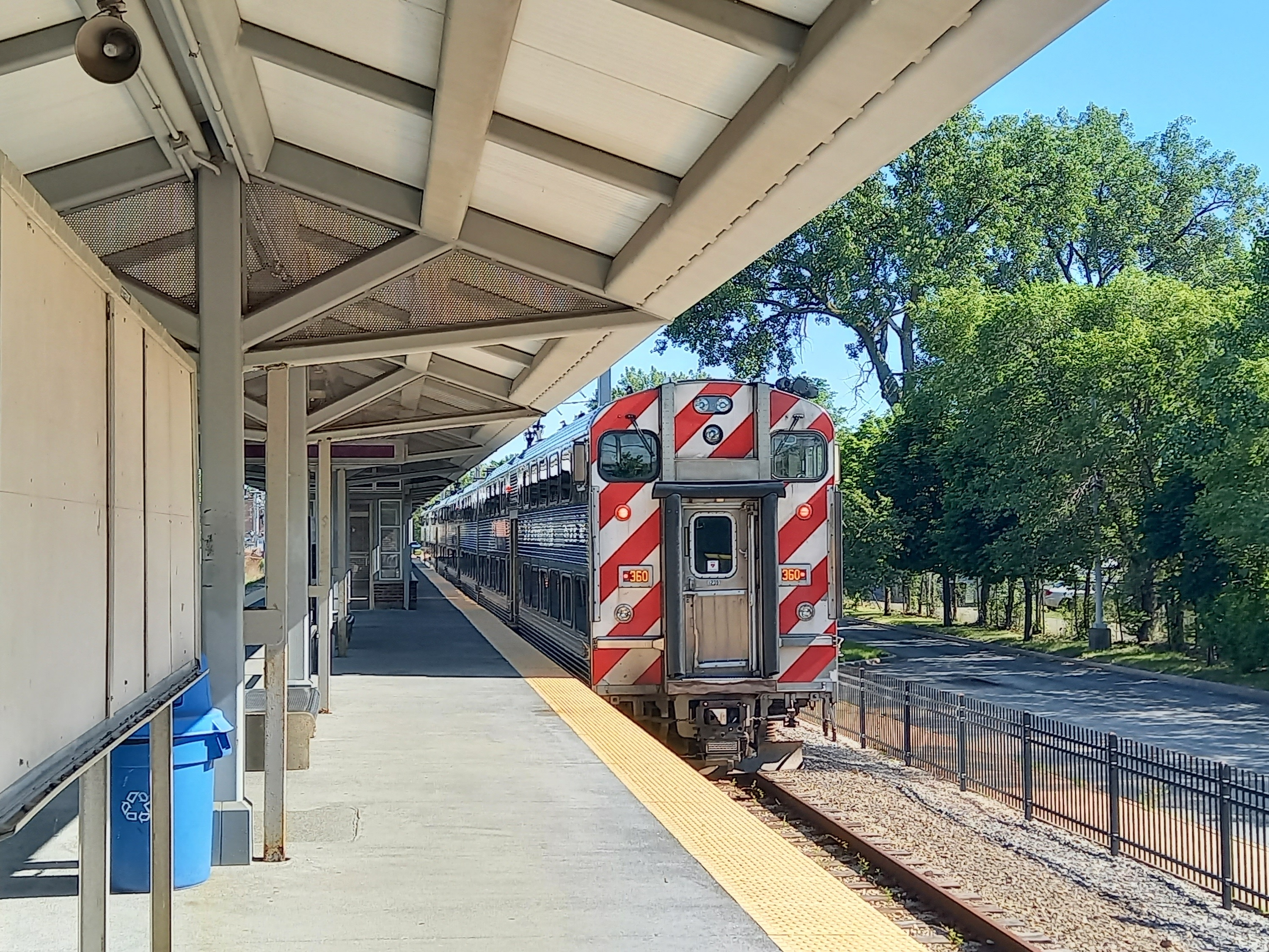
- A train at 93rd Street/South Chicago station

Overview
- Owner: Metra
- Locale: Chicago, Illinois, United States
- Termini: Millennium Station; 93rd Street/South Chicago, Blue Island, University Park
- Stations: 49 (total); 19 (to 93rd Street); 29 (to Blue Island); 34 (1 under reconstruction) (to University Park)
- Website: metra.com/train-lines/me

Service
- Type: Commuter rail
- System: Metra
- Services: 3
- Operator: Metra
- Daily ridership: 34,000 (weekday average; 2014)
- Ridership: 3,687,221 (2025)

Technical
- Line length: 13.2 miles (21.2 km) (to 93rd Street); 18.9 miles (30.4 km) (to Blue Island); 31.5 miles (50.7 km) (to University Park)
- Track gauge: 4 ft 8 1/2 in (1,435 mm) standard gauge
- Electrification: Overhead line, 1,500 V DC
- Operating speed: 65 miles per hour (105 km/h) (top)
Route map
Metra Electric District highlighted in orange
- ‡ = temporarily closed for reconstruction
Key
- Mileage source

The Metra Electric District (MED or ME) is an electrified commuter rail line owned and operated by Metra which connects Millennium Station (formerly Randolph Street Station), in downtown Chicago, with the city's southern suburbs. As of 2018, it is the fifth busiest of Metra's 11 lines, after the BNSF, UP-NW, UP-N, and UP-W Lines with nearly 7.7 million annual riders. While Metra does not explicitly refer to any of its lines by color, the timetable accents for the Metra Electric District are printed in bright "Panama orange" to reflect the line's origins with the Illinois Central Railroad (IC) and its Panama Limited passenger train. Apart from the spots where its tracks run parallel to other main lines, it is the only Metra line running entirely on dedicated passenger tracks, with no freight trains operating anywhere on the route (the only exceptions perhaps being occasional work or repair trains). The line is the only one in the Metra system with more than one station in Downtown Chicago, the only line with no stations in fare zone 4, and also has the highest number of stations (49) of any Metra line.

It is the only Metra line powered by overhead lines, the only line with high-level platforms and level boarding, and the only line with three service branches. Trains operate on 1,500 V DC. The main line north of Kensington/115th Street is shared with the Northern Indiana Commuter Transportation District's South Shore Line, an electric interurban line through northern Indiana to South Bend.

== Service ==
The Electric District has more frequent service than any other Metra line. As of August 2023, Metra operates 131 trains (64 inbound and 67 outbound) on the line on weekdays. On the main line, 27 inbound trains originate from University Park, four from Homewood, and three from Kensington/115th Street, while three outbound trains terminate at Kensington/115th Street, four at Homewood, and the remaining 26 at University Park. There are also 20 inbound and 22 outbound trains (42 total) on the South Chicago (93rd Street) branch, as well as ten inbound and 12 outbound (22 total) trains on the Blue Island branch (one outbound train to Blue Island, No. 245, originates from Kensington/115th Street, not Millennium Station).

On Saturdays, Metra operates 41 roundtrip trains on the line, including 21 on the main line to University Park, 16 trains on the South Chicago branch, and four on the Blue Island branch.

On Sunday and holidays, Metra operates 22 trains on the line, with 12 roundtrips operating on the main line to University Park and 10 trains operating on the South Chicago branch. Service on the Blue Island branch is suspended during these times.

The trunk stretch of the line shared between all branches from Millennium Station to 63rd Street is the most heavily traveled section on the entire Metra system. At 55th-56th-57th Street, passengers may transfer between main line and South Chicago/Blue Island branch services, as well as to South Shore Line service to Indiana.

The Metra Electric District has the best on-time performance of all Metra lines, averaging only one late train a month in 2014.

Trains operate at a maximum speed of 65 miles per hour (105 km/h); as of February 2024, work is underway to increase the maximum speed to 79 miles per hour (127 km/h), with an increase to 90 miles per hour (140 km/h) in certain sections potentially following.

== History ==
=== Steam era ===
The line was built by the Illinois Central Railroad, one of the first commuter services outside the major metropolitan areas of the northeastern United States. It opened on July 21, 1856 between the IC's then-downtown station, Great Central Station, (now Millennium Station) and Hyde Park. Part of the line was elevated for the World's Columbian Exposition of 1893 in Jackson Park.

The line predates the 1871 Great Chicago Fire, and ran on a trestle just offshore in Lake Michigan. After the fire, remains of buildings destroyed by the fire were dumped into the lake, creating landfill that forms the foundation of Grant Park, which the Metra Electric District runs through.

Two branches were added: from Brookdale southeast to South Chicago in the early 1880s, and from Kensington southwest to Blue Island in the early 1890s, both later electrified along with the main line.

When the IC moved its intercity operations to Central Station in 1893, it built Randolph Street Terminal on the former site of Great Central to handle its growing commuter operations.

=== Electric IC era ===
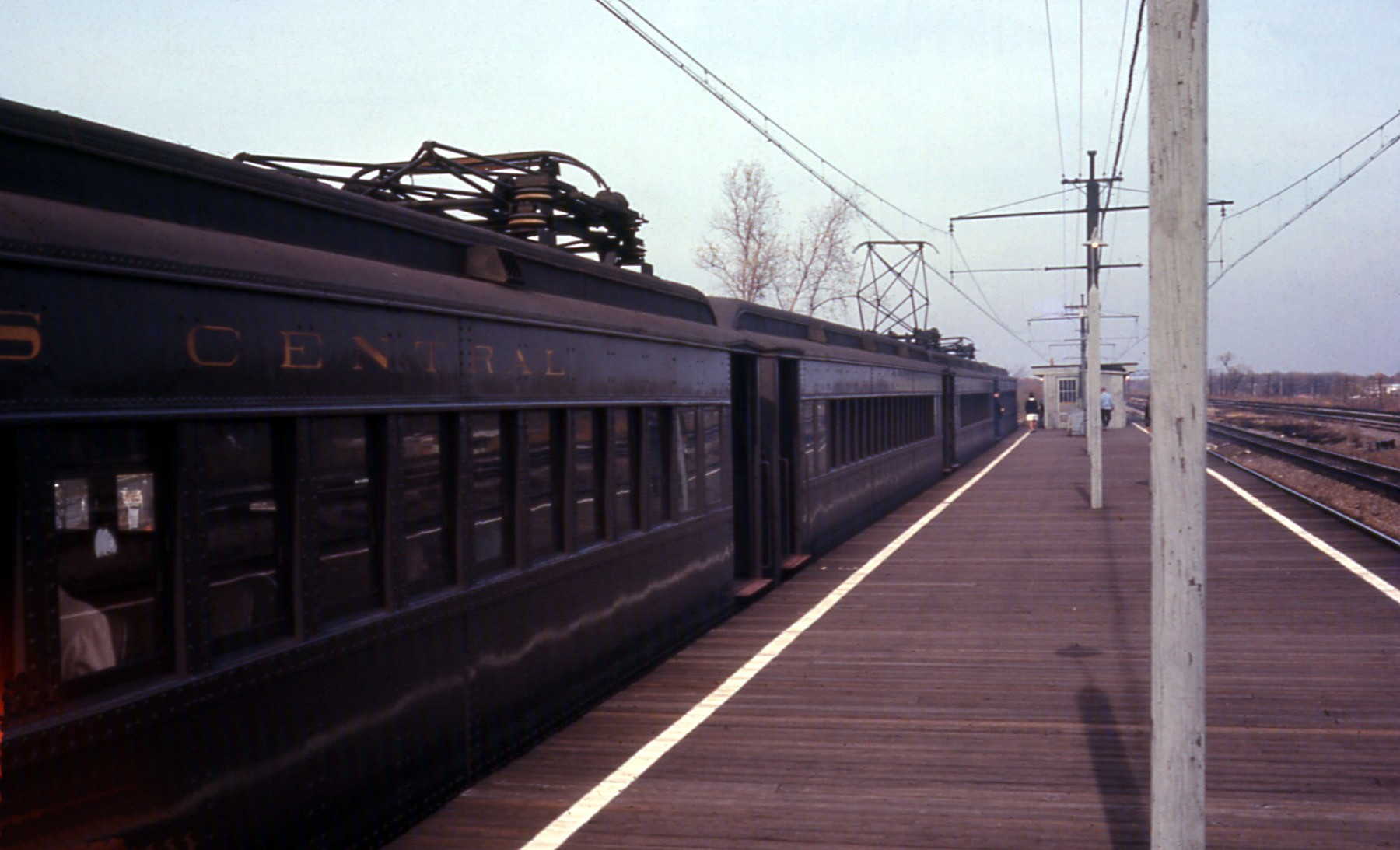
An Illinois Central train at Richton Park in 1968

By the early 20th century the IC operated up to 300 steam-hauled trains each day. In 1919, the IC and the Chicago city government collaborated on a grade separation project from the far south suburb of Homewood into the city. They also dug a trench from the near south side into the city proper, eliminating all grade crossings on the main line except one just south of the Richton Park station. The University Park extension required the line to cross a very long private driveway. The South Chicago branch runs at grade, crossing many city streets.

The grade crossing elimination project was followed by electrification. The IC electrified the commuter tracks in 1926, from downtown to Matteson. In addition to the removal of all grade crossings, the tracks were separated from, and moved to the west side of, the two freight and inter-city tracks. At McCormick Place just south of downtown Chicago, the two non-electrified tracks to Central Station crossed over the new electric alignment. The electric tracks continued north to Randolph Street Terminal.

Service was extended 1.1 miles (1.8 km) southward from Matteson to Richton Park, a new station at the south end of the coach storage yard, in 1946. The main line had six tracks between Roosevelt Road (Central Station) and 53rd Street (reduced to four in 1962), four to 111th Street, then two. The South Chicago branch is double tracked, and the Blue Island branch has a single track with a passing siding at West Pullman.

The "IC Electric" was once Chicago's busiest suburban railroad, and carried a great deal of traffic within the city as well as to suburban communities. The three lines carried 26 million passengers in 1927, the first full year of electrified operation. Ridership rose to 35 million in 1929, and reached an all-time peak of 47 million in 1946, when 128,000 passengers boarded each day. Between 1935 and 1949, the South Chicago branch was served by trains every 10 minutes all-day.

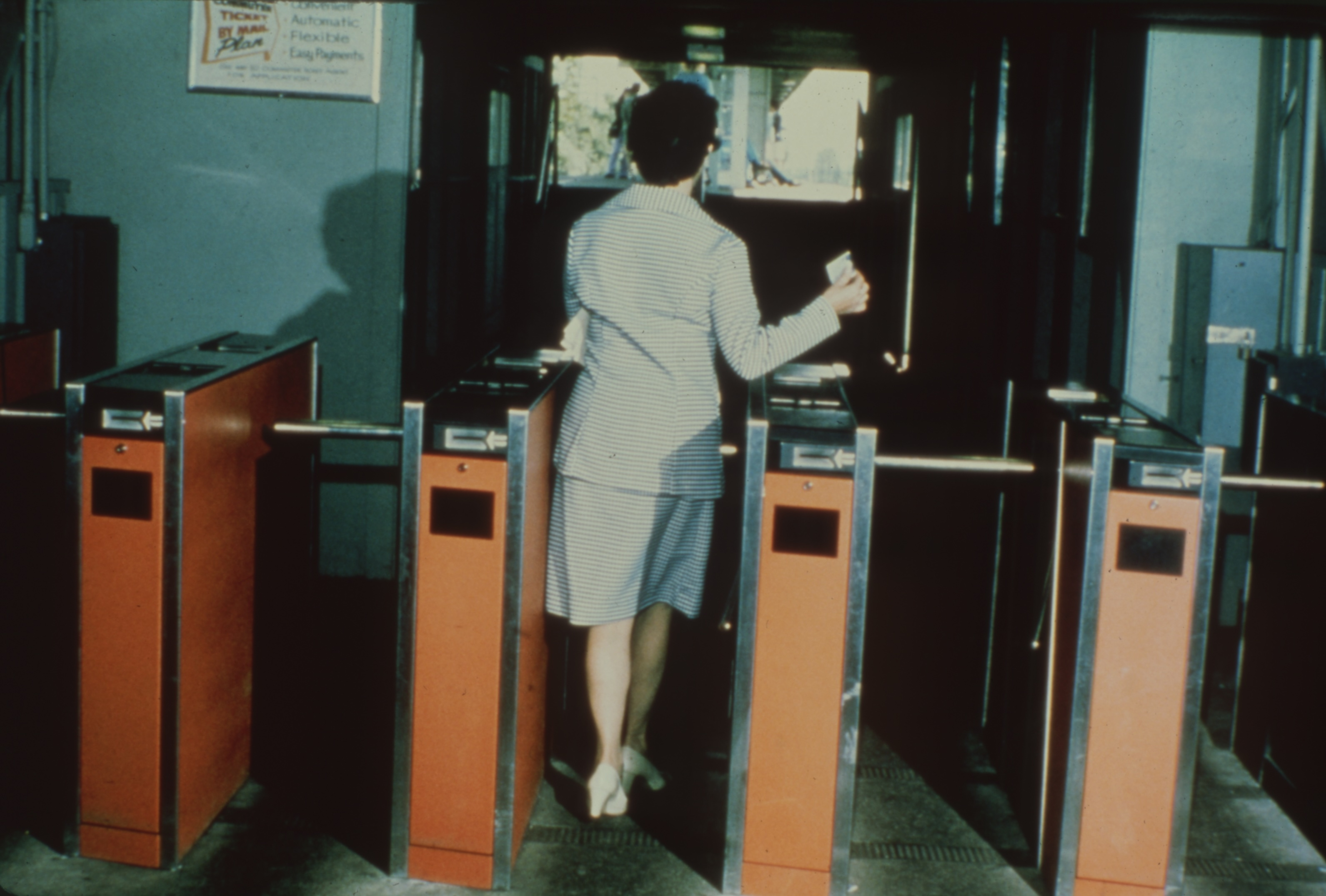
Turnstiles in use at a station on the line, circa 1970s

Faced with declining ridership as urban transportation patterns changed, the Illinois Central attempted to modernize the IC Electric system from 1966, implementing an automatic ticketing scheme called Automated Revenue Collection System (ARCS), which comprised a system of faregates and magnetic cards scanned by passengers when entering and exiting stations. This was intended to enable the reduction of train crews from three—engineer, conductor, and ticket collector—to just two, eliminating the position of the ticket collector. However, labour dispute arbitration and a 1969 strike forestalled these plans.

By 1960, ridership on the IC Electric had fallen to less than 54,000 daily, the line was a loss-maker most years, and ridership was overwhelmingly concentrated in commuting peak hours. The system's rolling stock still dated to the original 1920s electrification but funds were not available for their replacement. The system's position degraded severely from 1969, when the Dan Ryan branch of the Chicago "L" opened. That line, subsidised and publicly operated, in contrast to the unsubsidised IC Electric, operated with cost-effective one-person crews, and attracted customers with lower fares, better off-peak service, and integration with the city bus network. In response to declining ridership, the Illinois Central began to raise fares, starting from a price very similar to that of the "L" but rising to 1973 to a price 40% greater.

In 1972 the IC Electric, with assistance of public funding from the Chicago South Suburban Mass Transit District, procured new rolling stock in the Highliner railcars. Although highly modern compared to the railway's existing fleet, they had fewer doors than the old coaches, and also featured the interior layout of the gallery cars designed to facilitate fare collection despite the use of automated faregates, a design optimized for long-haul suburban service but ill-suited to the line's former role as urban rapid transit. This mirrored progressive declines in service; through 1949, the South Chicago Branch had 10-minute headways, but this service had fallen to 30-minute frequency patterns by 1974. Frequency, however, increased on the mainline and the Blue Island Branch from every 40 minutes to every 30 minutes, reflecting a shift from urban to suburban service.

==== 1972 collision ====
The Illinois Central Gulf commuter rail crash, the worst rail accident in Chicago history, occurred on October 30, 1972. A commuter train made up of new lightweight bi-level Highliner cars, inbound to Randolph Street Station during the morning rush hour, overshot the 27th Street platform and backed up into the station. The bi-level train had already tripped the signals to green for the next train, an older, heavy steel single-level express train. As the bi-level train was backing up at 11 miles per hour (18 km/h), it was struck by the single-level train at full speed. The single-level train telescoped the bi-level train, killing 45 passengers and injuring hundreds more, primarily in the bi-level train. A major contributing factor was that Illinois Central Gulf used a dark gray color scheme on the front ends of the Highliner fleet, which was very difficult to see on the cloudy morning of the accident. After the accident the ends of all of the ICG 1926 heavyweight still in use and Highliner MU fleet were partially painted with bright orange added for additional visibility.

=== RTA era ===
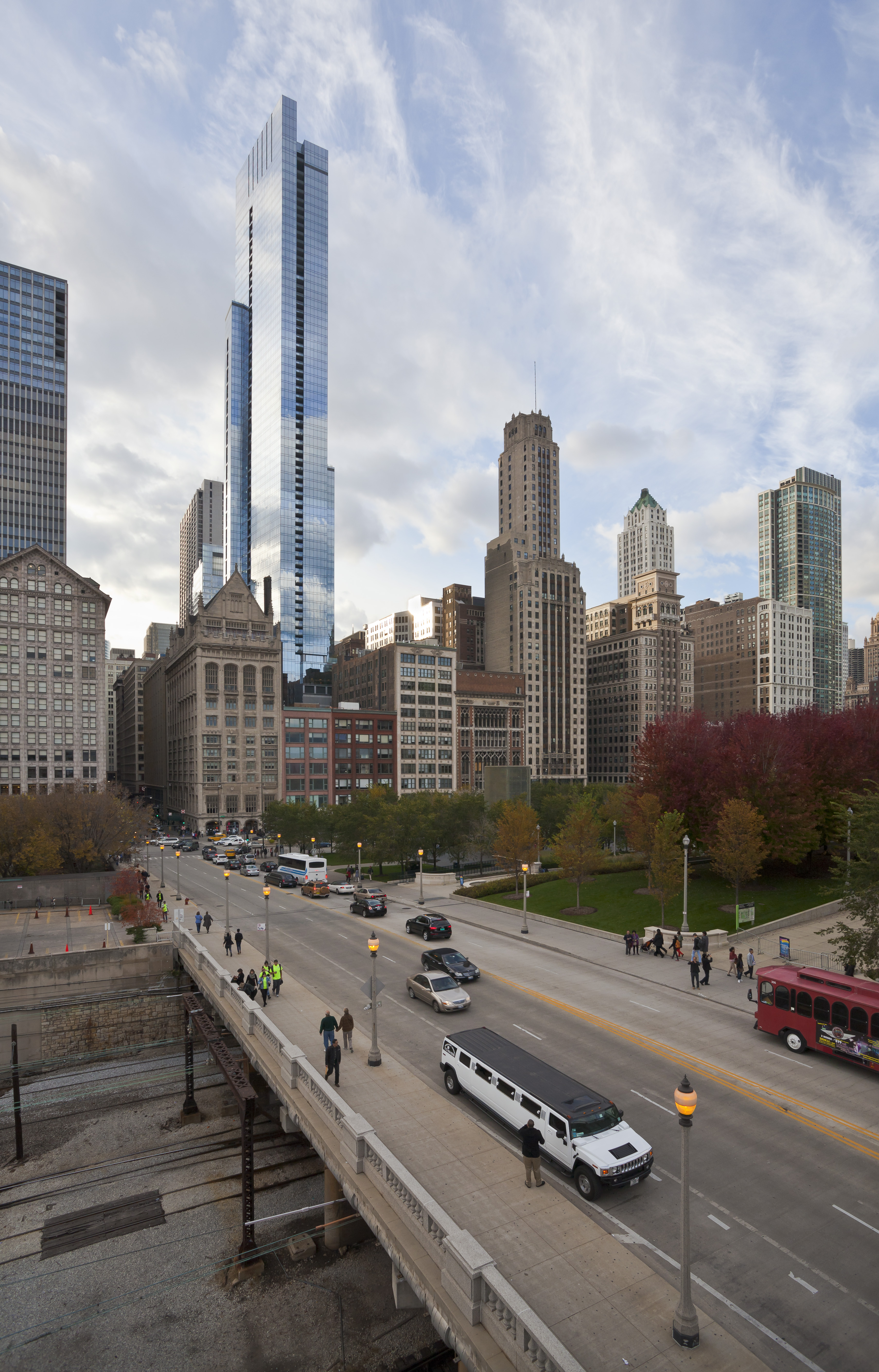
Monroe Street, to the south of which (lower left) the Metra tracks emerge from the tunnel into Millennium Station

In 1976 the Regional Transportation Authority signed a contract with Illinois Central Gulf to fund its commuter service. The next year an extension of 2.3 miles (3.7 km) was built to the current terminal at University Park (originally named Park Forest South). On May 1, 1987, Metra bought the line and its branches for $28 million ($79.3 million adjusted for inflation). The line is now operated by Northeast Illinois Regional Commuter Rail Corporation, Metra's operating subsidiary. Two inter-city freight tracks retained by the ICG are now part of the Canadian National Railway, used by Amtrak's City of New Orleans, Illini and Saluki trains.

From 1988 onward, Randolph Street Terminal was under near-perpetual construction. The construction of Millennium Park moved the station completely underground, and in 2005 it was renamed Millennium Station.

The Metra Electric is the only line on the Metra system in which all stations (except 18th and 47th Streets, both flag stops) have ticket vending machines. The machines originally sold magnetically encoded tickets which unlocked the turnstiles. People with paper tickets or weekend passes, on reduced fares or who had trouble with the vending machines had to use a blue or orange pal phone to contact an operator who would unlock the turnstiles. Complaints from passengers who missed their trains caused Metra to remove the turnstiles in November 2003.

The main line and South Chicago branch run daily, but the Blue Island Branch does not operate on Sundays or holidays. A unique feature of the Metra Electric schedule is the similarity of the weekday and Saturday timetables. Many express trains run throughout the day in both directions. On other Metra lines, express service operates exclusively during the morning and afternoon rush hours. It is the only Metra line where all trackage is used exclusively for commuter service. Freight trains and Amtrak trains run on a pair of adjacent tracks owned by the Canadian National Railroad.

Off-peak and Saturday service is frequent, while Sunday service operates hourly north of 63rd Street and every 2 hours south of 63rd.

On January 4, 2021, fares on the Metra Electric line, along with the Rock Island line, were cut in half for all passengers.

Since July 2024, a fourth track is being constructed from Museum Campus to Millennium stations to accommodate increased services on the South Shore Line.

== Potential expansion or service alterations ==
=== Gold Line and Gray Line proposals ===
The proposed Gold Line, derived from the earlier and more extensive Gray Line plan would have the Electric District operate more like a rapid transit line, by running trains more frequently (every ten minutes between 6am and midnight) with reduced-fare transfers to CTA buses and trains. Unlike the current service, which bypasses many stations to reach suburban stations more quickly, it would make all stops within the city. It would run from Millennium Station to South Chicago (93rd Street) at an estimated cost at $160 million. Since the Gold Line was proposed, the idea of providing rapid transit service along Chicago's south lakefront has gained considerable support from neighborhoods along its route. Despite its popular support, officials from CTA and Metra have largely dismissed the plan, focusing on other expansion projects. In response to this and other concerns, in 2009 the RTA and the Chicago Department of Transportation authorized $450,000 for a "South Lakefront Study" that is anticipated to yield either one or two new transit projects that are eligible for Federal transit funding. The study was completed in November 2012, and is now available on the City of Chicago's website.

=== Peotone extension ===
An extension to Peotone, Illinois, the Proposed Chicago south suburban airport, or even Kankakee, with a stop in Monee has been considered since the SouthWest Service was extended to Manhattan.

As part of the transition from the Regional Transportation Authority to the Northern Illinois Transit Authority, Metra will be required to undertake a study evaluating the possibility of an extension from University Park to Kankakee.

=== 2017 service expansion ===
On May 24, 2017, Metra announced new schedule proposals for the line. The new schedule will provide rapid service for the Hyde Park stations every 20 minutes on weekdays until 7 p.m. and every half-hour on Saturdays. The proposed schedule also calls for boosting service on the main line from 63rd Street to Kensington, from every two hours to every hour. However, the proposed schedule also calls for the elimination of lightly used Blue Island trains, including all Saturday service.

After reviewing community feedback, Metra decided to keep four Saturday Blue Island trains and one late night trip to South Chicago. The new service went into effect September 11, 2017.

=== MED 90 ===
Since 2024, Metra has been evaluating increasing top speeds on the Metra Electric main line from 65 miles per hour (105 km/h) to 90 miles per hour (140 km/h). Metra points to the line's infrastructure advantages compared to other lines such as electrification, four main tracks on most of the route, grade-separation, and Metra having full ownership of the tracks with no freight train traffic. Some additional infrastructure improvements and testing will need to be conducted before raising speeds.

== Ridership ==
Between 2014 and 2019, annual ridership declined 23% from 9.4 million to 7.3 million passengers. Due to the COVID-19 pandemic, ridership dropped to 2,019,403 passengers in 2020 and to 1,836,723 in 2021. The line's 3,687,221 riders in 2025 made it the fifth busiest Metra line.

== Rolling stock ==
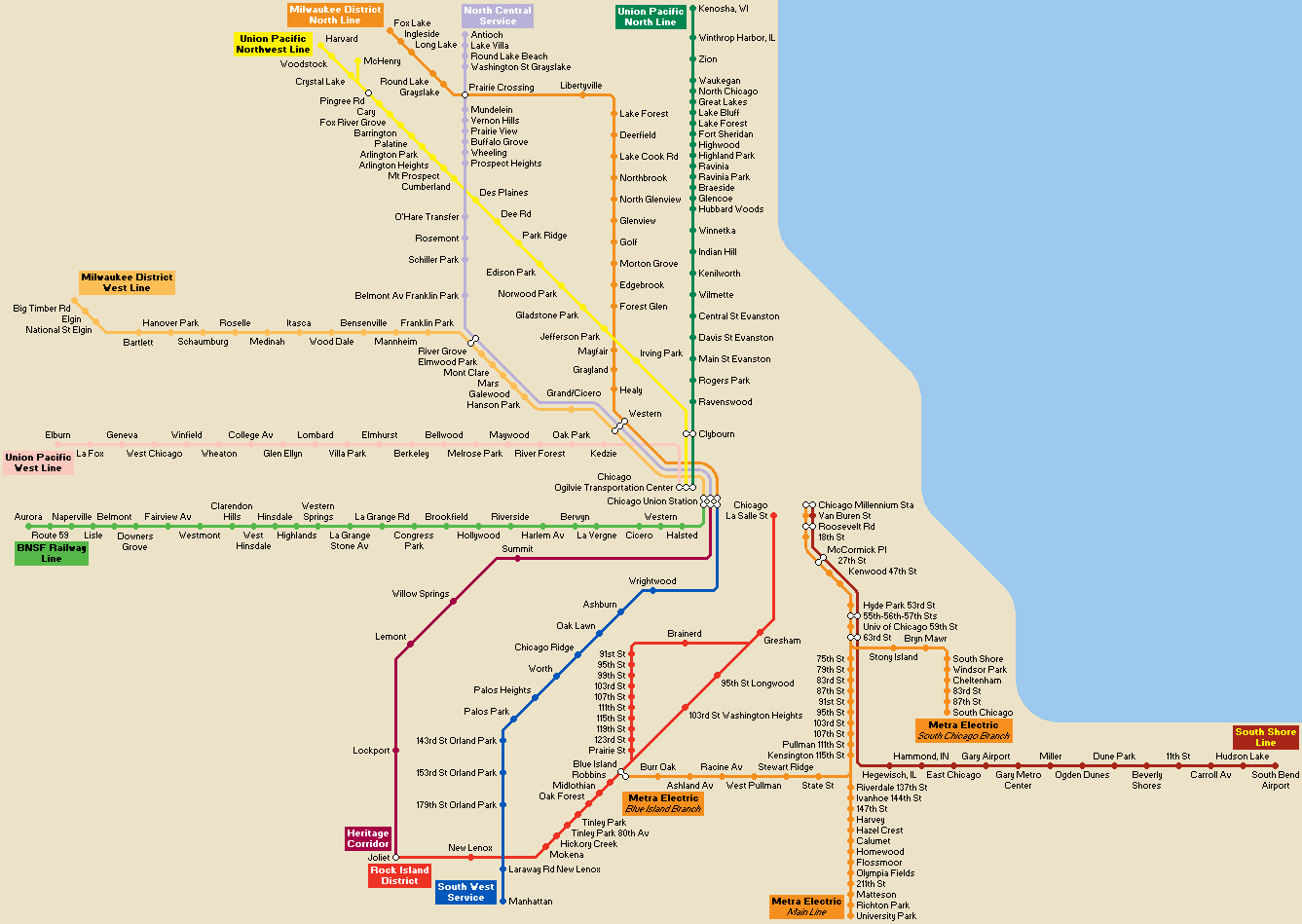
Metra Electric District lines are in Panama Orange, South Shore in Dark Burgundy.

The Metra Electric District uses second-generation bi-level Highliner multiple unit cars built by Nippon Sharyo. Those were supplemented by additional EMUs built at Nippon Sharyo's Rochelle, Illinois facility opened in 2012. In 2005, these began to replace the original Highliner fleet built by St. Louis Car Company and Bombardier in the 1970s.

On February 12, 2016, the original Highliners left on their last run in revenue service. Metra confirmed in a Facebook post that twenty-four cars are being sent to museums around the Midwestern United States, including the Illinois Railway Museum, while an unconfirmed source stated that some cars were sent to Mendota, Illinois to be scrapped.

Numbers	Type	Year built	Builder	Status
1227-1387	Highliner II	2012–2016	Nippon Sharyo	In Service
1201-1226	Highliner II	2005	Nippon Sharyo	In Service
1501-1630	Highliner	1971-1972	St. Louis	Retired
1631-1666	Highliner	1978-1979	Bombardier	Retired
1100-1229	EMU coach	1926	Pullman	Retired
1230-1239	EMU coach	1928	Pullman	Retired
1301-1320	EMU trailer	1921	Pullman	Retired
1321-1345	EMU trailer	1924	Pullman	Retired
1346-1430	EMU trailer	1926	Standard Steel	Retired
1431-1440	EMU Trailer	1928	Pullman	Retired

== Stations ==
=== Main branch ===
County	Zone	Location	Station	Connections and notes
Cook	1	Chicago	Millennium Station	South Shore Line: Lakeshore Corridor, Monon Corridor; Chicago "L": Red (at Lake), Green Brown Orange Pink Purple (at Washington/Wabash); CTA buses: 3 4 X4 6 19 20 26 60 N66 124 143 147 148 151 157; Pace: 850, 851, 855; ChicaGo Dash
Cook	1	Chicago	Van Buren Street	South Shore Line: Lakeshore Corridor, Monon Corridor; CTA buses: 1 3 4 X4 6 7 J14 26 126 130 147 148 151
Cook	1	Chicago	Museum Campus/11th Street	South Shore Line: Lakeshore Corridor, Monon Corridor; Chicago "L": Red Green Orange (at Roosevelt); CTA buses: 1 3 4 X4 6 12 18 130 146
Cook	2	Chicago	18th Street	
Cook	2	Chicago	McCormick Place	CTA buses: 3 21
Cook	2	Chicago	27th Street	CTA buses: 3 21
Cook	2	Chicago	31st Street	Closed between 1960 and 1965
Cook	2	Chicago	35th Street	Closed between 1939 and 1957
Cook	2	Chicago	39th Street (Oakland)	Closed between 1939 and 1957
Cook	2	Chicago	43rd Street	Closed between 1960 and 1965
Cook	2	Chicago	47th Street/Kenwood	CTA buses: 2 6 28 47
Cook	2	Chicago	51st/53rd Street/Hyde Park	CTA buses: 2 6 15 28 171 172
Cook	2	Chicago	55th/56th/57th Street	South Shore Line: Lakeshore Corridor, Monon Corridor; CTA buses: 15 28 55 171
Cook	2	Chicago	59th/60th Street/UChicago	CTA buses: 2 6 15 28
Cook	2	Chicago	63rd Street	South Shore Line: Lakeshore Corridor; CTA buses: 63
Cook	2	Chicago	67th Street	Closed 1984
Cook	2	Chicago	72nd Street	Closed between 1960 and 1965
Cook	2	Chicago	75th Street/Grand Crossing	CTA buses: 30 75
Cook	2	Chicago	79th Street/Chatham	CTA buses: 79
Cook	2	Chicago	83rd Street/Avalon Park	
Cook	2	Chicago	87th Street/Woodruff	CTA buses: 87
Cook	2	Chicago	91st Street/Chesterfield	
Cook	2	Chicago	95th Street/CSU	CTA buses: 4 X4 N5 95 100 115
Cook	2	Chicago	103rd Street/Rosemoor	CTA buses: 4 34 106 115
Cook	2	Chicago	107th Street	CTA buses: 4 115
Cook	2	Chicago	111th Street/Pullman	CTA buses: 4 111A 115
Cook	2	Chicago	115th Street/Kensington	CTA buses: 4 111A 115
Cook	2	Chicago	130th Street/Wildwood	Closed between 1960 and 1965
Cook	2	Riverdale	Riverdale	Pace: 348
Cook	2	Riverdale	Ivanhoe	
Cook	2	Harvey	147th Street/Sibley	Pace: 350, 352
Cook	2	Harvey	Harvey	Pace: 348, 349, 350, 352, 354, 356, 360, 361, 364, 890
Cook	2	Hazel Crest	Hazel Crest	Pace: 356
Cook	2	East Hazel Crest	Calumet	Pace: 356
Cook	3	Homewood	Homewood	Amtrak: City of New Orleans, Illini and Saluki; Pace: 356, 359
Cook	3	Flossmoor	Flossmoor	
Cook	3	Olympia Fields	Olympia Fields	
Cook	3	Olympia Fields	211th Street/Lincoln Highway	Pace: 357
Cook	3	Matteson	Matteson	
Cook	3	Richton Park	Richton Park	
Will	3	University Park	University Park	Pace: 367; River Valley Metro: University Park 1, University Park 2

=== South Chicago branch ===
The branch leaves the mainline south of the former 67th Street station.

County	Zone	Location	Station	Connections and notes
Cook	2	Chicago	Stony Island	CTA buses: 28 71
Cook	2	Chicago	Bryn Mawr	CTA buses: N5 J14 15 71
Cook	2	Chicago	South Shore	CTA buses: 6 26 71
Cook	2	Chicago	75th Street/Windsor Park	CTA buses: N5 71 75
Cook	2	Chicago	79th Street/Cheltenham	CTA buses: 79
Cook	2	Chicago	83rd Street/South Chicago	CTA buses: N5 26 71
Cook	2	Chicago	87th Street/South Chicago	CTA buses: 87
Cook	2	Chicago	91st Street/South Chicago	Closed in 2001, replaced by 93rd Street/South Chicago
Cook	2	Chicago	93rd Street/South Chicago	CTA buses: N5 26 30 71 87 95

=== Blue Island branch ===
The branch leaves the main line south of 115th Street/Kensington.

County	Zone	Location	Station	Connections and notes
Cook	2	Chicago	State Street	CTA buses: 34
Cook	2	Chicago	Stewart Ridge	
Cook	2	Chicago	West Pullman	CTA buses: 8A 108; Pace: 352, 359
Cook	2	Chicago	Racine Avenue	
Cook	2	Calumet Park	Ashland/Calumet Park	
Cook	2	Calumet Park	Burr Oak	Pace: 359
Cook	2	Blue Island	Blue Island	Metra: Rock Island (at Blue Island/Vermont Street); Pace: 348, 349, 359, 385
