= 75th Street/Grand Crossing station =

Commuter rail station in Chicago, Illinois

75th Street/Grand Crossing

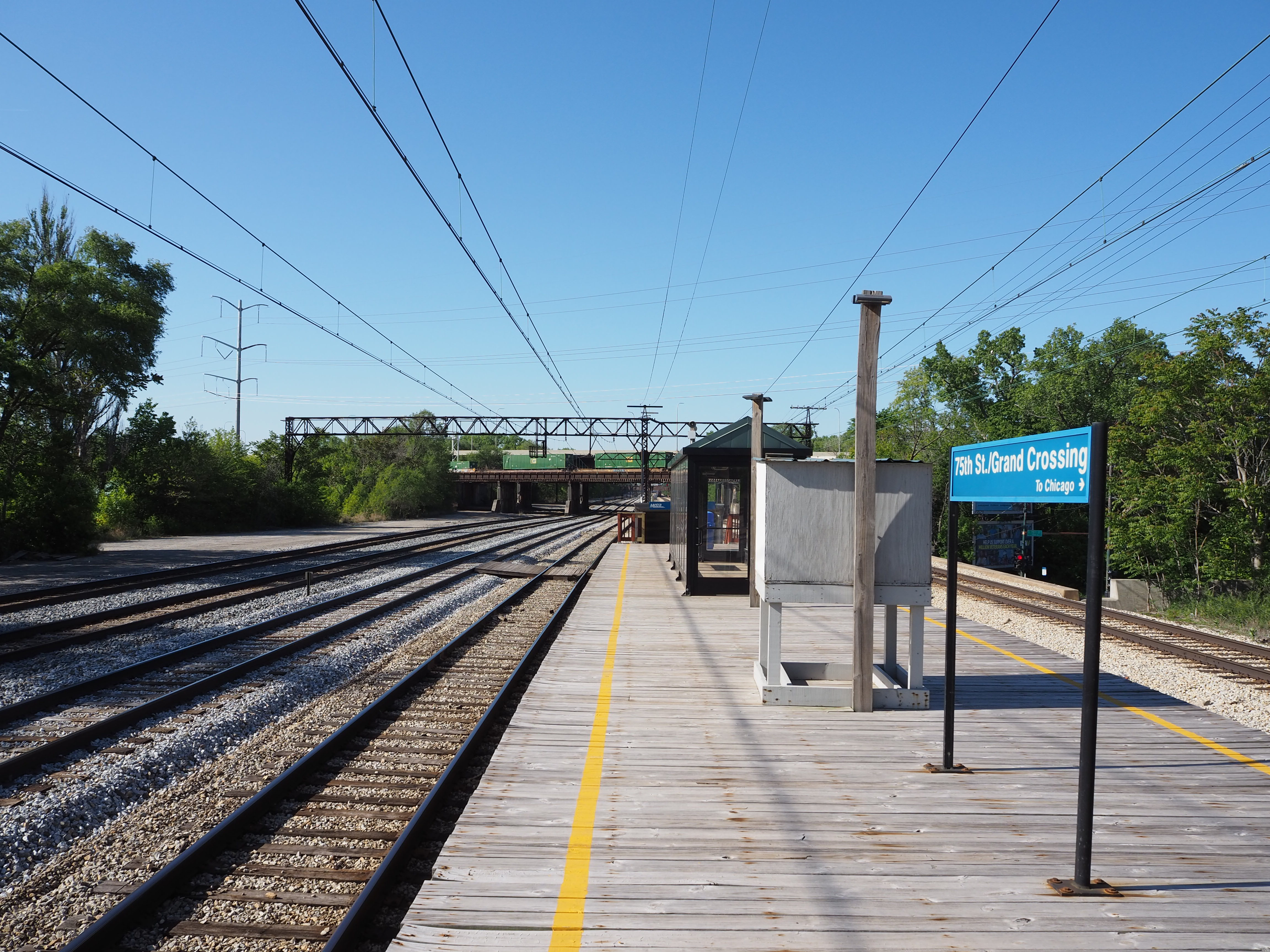
- 75th Street (Grand Crossing) station in May 2023

General information
- Location: 75th Street and South Chicago Avenue; Greater Grand Crossing, Chicago, Illinois
- Coordinates: 41.7591°N 87.5954°W
- Owner: Metra
- Line: University Park Sub District
- Platforms: 1 Island platform
- Tracks: 4
- Connections: CTA Bus

Construction
- Accessible: No

Other information
- Fare zone: 2

History
- Rebuilt: 1969
- Electrified: 1926

Passengers
- 2018: 14 (average weekday) ▼50%
- Rank: 231 out of 236

Services
Preceding station	Metra	Following station
79th Street/Chatham toward University Park or Blue Island	Metra Electric Main Line & Blue Island Branch	63rd Street toward Millennium
Former services
Preceding station	Illinois Central Railroad	Following station
79th Street toward Richton or Blue Island	Electric Suburban Main Line & Blue Island Branch	72nd Street toward Randolph Street
Track layout
Location

75th Street/Grand Crossing is an electrified commuter rail station along the Metra Electric Main Line in the Greater Grand Crossing neighborhood of Chicago, Illinois. It is located at and over both 75th Street and South Chicago Avenue, and is 9.3 miles (15.0 km) away from the northern terminus at Millennium Station. In Metra's zone-based fare system, Grand Crossing is in zone 2. As of 2018, the station is the 231st busiest of Metra's 236 non-downtown stations, with an average of 14 weekday boardings.

75th Street station is the first station on the main line after the South Chicago Branch diverges.

No parking is available for this station, however the Chicago Transit Authority does provide bus service here.

== History ==
The station and the neighborhood that surrounds it were named for the Grand Crossing, an on-grade railway junction constructed in 1853 by mutual agreement between the Lake Shore and Michigan Southern Railway (New York Central) and the Illinois Central Railroad in settlement of a right-of-way feud. By 1912, this on-grade crossing was eliminated when the successor line to the LS & MS was elevated. The now abandoned Nickel Plate Railroad tracks also crisscrossed the area. Another elevated crossing was constructed for the Chicago Skyway in 1958. As of 2011, these lines are owned by Metra, Canadian National Railway, and Norfolk Southern Railway.

== Bus connections ==
CTA

- 30 South Chicago (Monday–Saturday only)
- 75 74th/75th
