= 93rd Street/South Chicago station =

Commuter rail station in Chicago, Illinois

93rd Street/South Chicago

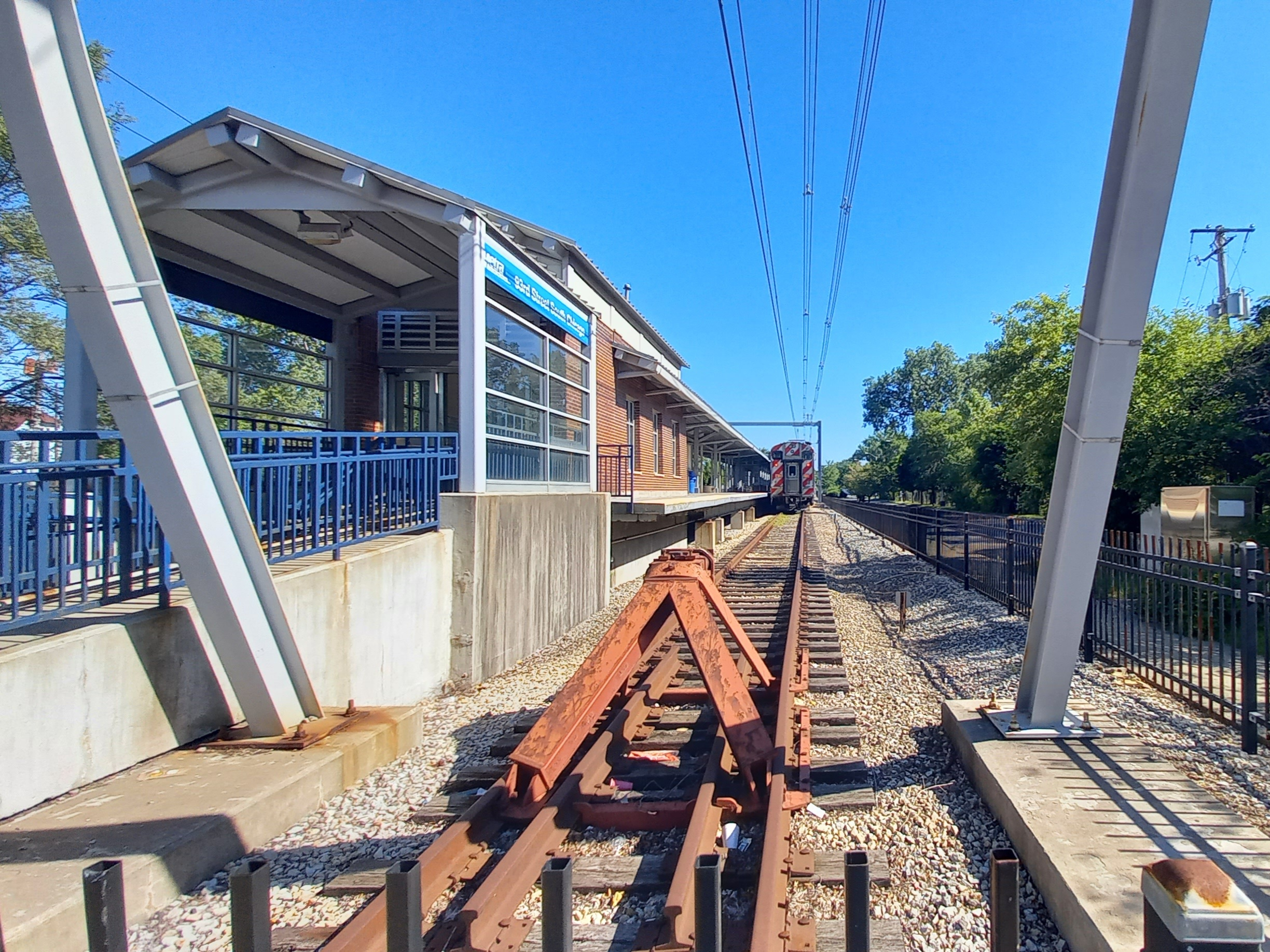
- 93rd Street station with a Highliner train in the background (June 2024)

General information
- Location: 93rd Street near Baltimore Avenue; South Chicago, Chicago, Illinois
- Coordinates: 41.7269°N 87.5478°W
- Owner: Metra
- Line: South Chicago Subdistrict
- Platforms: 1 island platform
- Tracks: 2
- Connections: CTA Bus

Construction
- Parking: Yes; Vendors
- Accessible: Yes

Other information
- Fare zone: 2

History
- Opened: 2001

Passengers
- 2018: 472 (average weekday) ▼23.7%
- Rank: 101 out of 236

Services
Preceding station	Metra	Following station
87th Street/South Chicago toward Millennium	Metra Electric South Chicago Branch	Terminus
Track layout
Location

93rd Street/South Chicago station is a Metra Electric District station on East 93rd St and South Baltimore Avenue (9300 S, 3300 E) in Chicago's South Chicago neighborhood. The station provides transport services to Chicago's South Chicago, South Deering, and East Side neighborhoods. The station is located 13.0 miles (20.9 km) southeast of Millennium Station, the line's northern terminus at Randolph/South Water Street in downtown Chicago. As of 2018, South Chicago (93rd Street) is the 101st busiest of Metra's 236 non-downtown stations, with an average of 472 weekday boardings.

The South Chicago Branch, a 4.7-mile (7.6 km) spur line, was built for the Illinois Central Railroad (IC). The IC operated the South Chicago Branch from startup in 1883 until the line was sold, with the rest of Metra Electric, to the public sector in 1987. The line was electrified in 1926. In 2001, Metra built the 93rd Street terminus as a replacement for the 91st Street (South Chicago) terminal.

This station is the only outbound Metra terminus located within the corporate limits of the city of Chicago. It is 6 blocks south of the 87th Street Metra Electric South Chicago Branch station. Travel time to Van Buren/Jackson Street station in Downtown Chicago is about 35 minutes.

A station typology adopted by the Chicago Plan Commission on October 16, 2014 assigns the South Chicago 93rd Street station a typology of Local Activity Center. A Local Activity Center is primarily characterized by the Metra station being the central focus of a built-up and identifiable neighborhood.

== History ==
South Chicago (91st Street) was a commuter rail station on the Metra Electric District's South Chicago branch at East 91st Street and South Baltimore Avenue in Chicago's South Chicago neighborhood. The station provided service to the South Chicago, South Deering, Hegewisch, and East Side neighborhoods. In Metra's zone-based fare system, 91st Street was in zone B.

In June 1991, the 91st Street station caught fire after the victory of the Chicago Bulls in the 1991 NBA Finals led to a series of looting incidents during the night. In 2001, Metra constructed a new terminal two blocks south, at 93rd Street, to replace the damaged station. The new South Chicago station was dedicated June 4, 2001.

== Bus connections ==
CTA

- N5 South Shore Night Bus (Owl Service – overnight only)
- 26 South Shore Express (weekdays only)
- 30 South Chicago
- 71 71st/South Shore
- 87 87th
- 95 95th
