= Metra =

Suburban railroad operator in the Chicago metropolitan area, Illinois, US

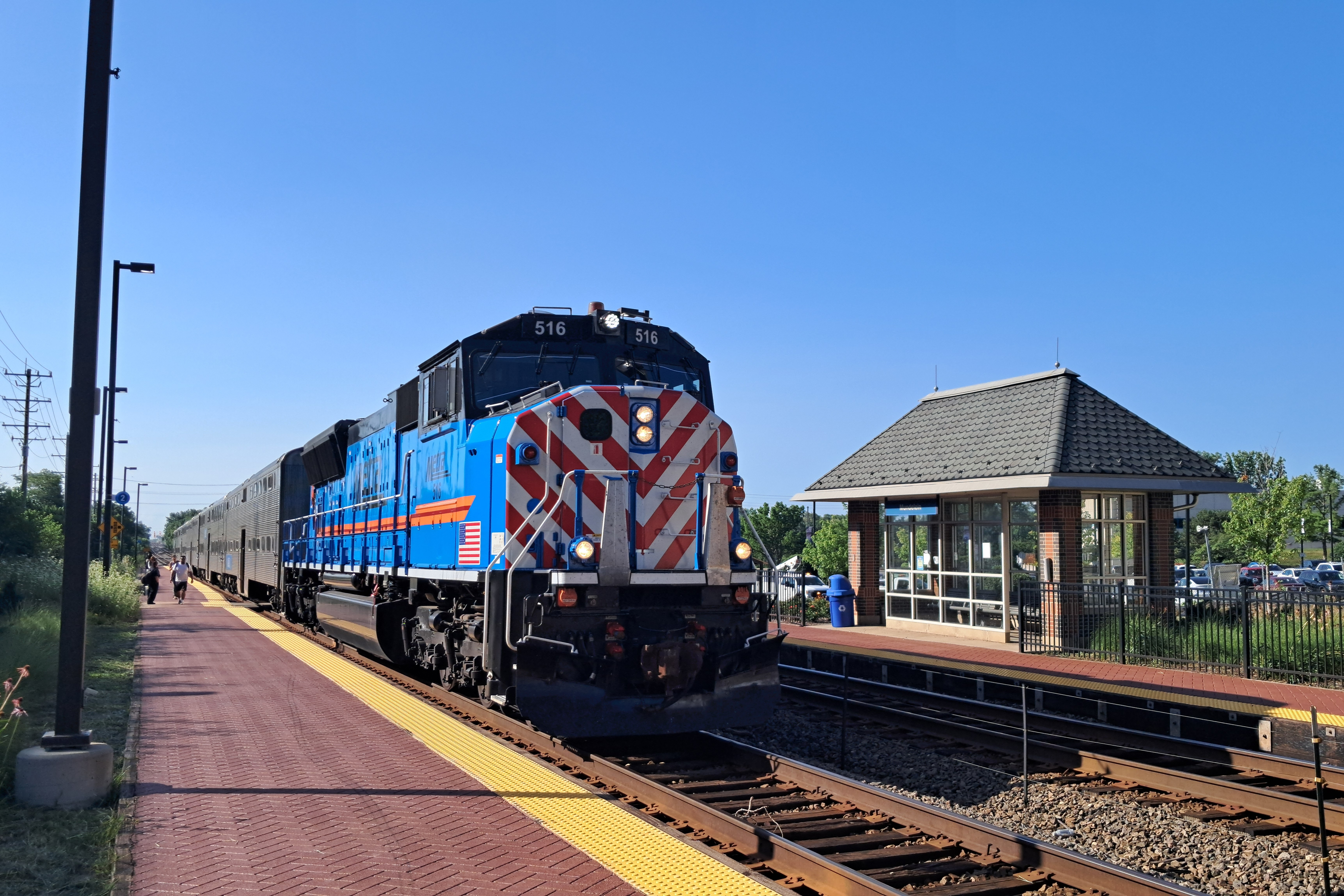
- A Metra train at Mundelein station, July 2026

Overview
- Owner: Northern Illinois Transit Authority (NITA)
- Locale: Chicago metropolitan area, United States
- Transit type: Commuter rail
- Number of lines: 11
- Number of stations: 242 year-round, 1 seasonal, 1 under construction
- Daily ridership: 167,400 (weekdays, Q2 2026)
- Annual ridership: 37,950,100 (2025)
- Chief executive: James M. Derwinski
- Headquarters: 547 W Jackson Blvd, Chicago, IL 60661
- Website: metra.com

Operation
- Began operation: June 8, 1984
- Operators: Metra, BNSF Railway
- Reporting marks: METX

Technical
- System length: 487.5 miles (784.6 km)
- Track gauge: 4 ft 8 1/2 in (1,435 mm) standard gauge
- Electrification: Metra Electric District: Overhead line, 1,500 V DC; Other lines: none
System map
Key
Fare zones
Connections

Metra, officially the Commuter Rail Division of the Northern Illinois Transit Authority, (reporting mark METX) is a commuter rail system in the Chicago metropolitan area that forms part of the Northern Illinois Transit Authority (NITA). It serves the city of Chicago, suburban Cook County, the five Illinois collar counties, and Kenosha, Wisconsin. It operates 243 stations and 11 commuter rail services from four terminal stations in downtown Chicago.

Metra is the fourth busiest commuter rail system in the United States by ridership and the largest and busiest commuter rail system outside the New York City metropolitan area. In 2025, the system had a ridership of approximately 38 million, or about 167,400 per weekday as of the second quarter of 2026. The estimated busiest day for Metra ridership occurred on November 4, 2016—the day of the Chicago Cubs 2016 World Series victory rally, with a record 460,000+ passengers.

Metra is the descendant of numerous passenger rail services dating to the 1850s. The present system dates to 1974, when the Illinois General Assembly established the Regional Transportation Authority (RTA) to consolidate transit operations in the Chicago area, including commuter rail as a public utility. The RTA's creation was a result of the anticipated withdrawal of commuter service operated and owned by various private railroad companies in the 1970s. In a 1983 reorganization, the RTA placed commuter rail under a newly formed Commuter Rail Division, which branded itself as Metra in 1985. As of May 2025, the BNSF Railway remains the only private freight rail company under a purchase-of-service agreement with Metra. Metra owns all rolling stock and is responsible for all stations along with the respective municipalities. Since its inception, Metra has directed more than $5 billion into the commuter rail system of the Chicago metropolitan area alongside the CTA. In January 2023, Metra rolled out a new real-time train tracking website to allow passengers greater visibility into their commute.

On September 1, 2026, Metra's new parent agency, the Northern Illinois Transit Authority (NITA), replaced the RTA. The NITA Act (SB 2111) that established the new parent agency took effect on June 1, 2026.

== History ==
=== Early Chicago commuter rail ===
Since the 19th century, Chicago has been a major hub in the North American rail network. It has more trackage radiating in more directions than any other city in North America. Railroads set up their headquarters in the city and Chicago became a center for building freight cars, passenger cars and diesel locomotives. Early commuter services were run by the Chicago, Burlington and Quincy, Chicago and North Western, and Milwaukee Road.

By the 1930s, Chicago had the world's largest public transportation system, but commuter rail services started to decline. By the mid-1970s, the commuter lines faced an uncertain future. The Burlington Northern, Milwaukee Road, Chicago and North Western and Illinois Central had been losing money for several years, and were using trainsets with passenger cars dating as far back as the 1920s.

=== Formation of the RTA ===
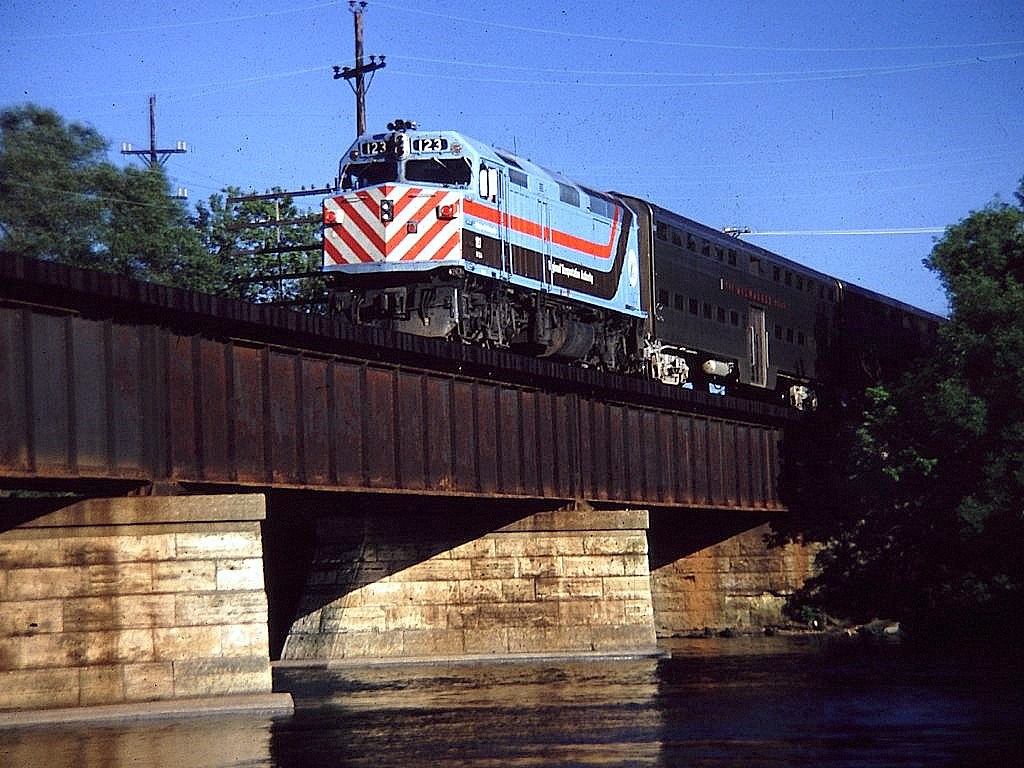
RTA EMD F40PH No. 123 crossing the Fox River in Elgin, Illinois, in 1981

To provide stability to the commuter rail system, the Illinois General Assembly formed the Regional Transportation Authority in 1974. Its purpose was to fund and plan the Chicago region's public transportation. After initially using second-hand equipment, the RTA took delivery of the first new EMD F40PH locomotives in 1976. That F40PH fleet is still in service today. The companies that had long provided commuter rail in the Chicago area continued to operate their lines under contract to the RTA.

Less than a decade later the RTA was already suffering from ongoing financial problems. Additionally, two rail providers, the Rock Island Line and the Milwaukee Road, went bankrupt, forcing the RTA to create the Northeast Illinois Regional Commuter Railroad Corporation to operate their lines directly in 1981 and 1982 respectively. In 1983 the Illinois Legislature reorganized the agency. That reorganization left the Regional Transportation Authority in charge of day-to-day operations of all bus, heavy rail and commuter rail services throughout the Chicago metropolitan area. It was also responsible for directing fare and service levels, setting up budgets, finding sources for capital investment and planning. A new Commuter Rail Division was created to handle commuter rail operations; along with CTA and Pace, it was one of RTA's three "service boards".

=== Metra branding ===
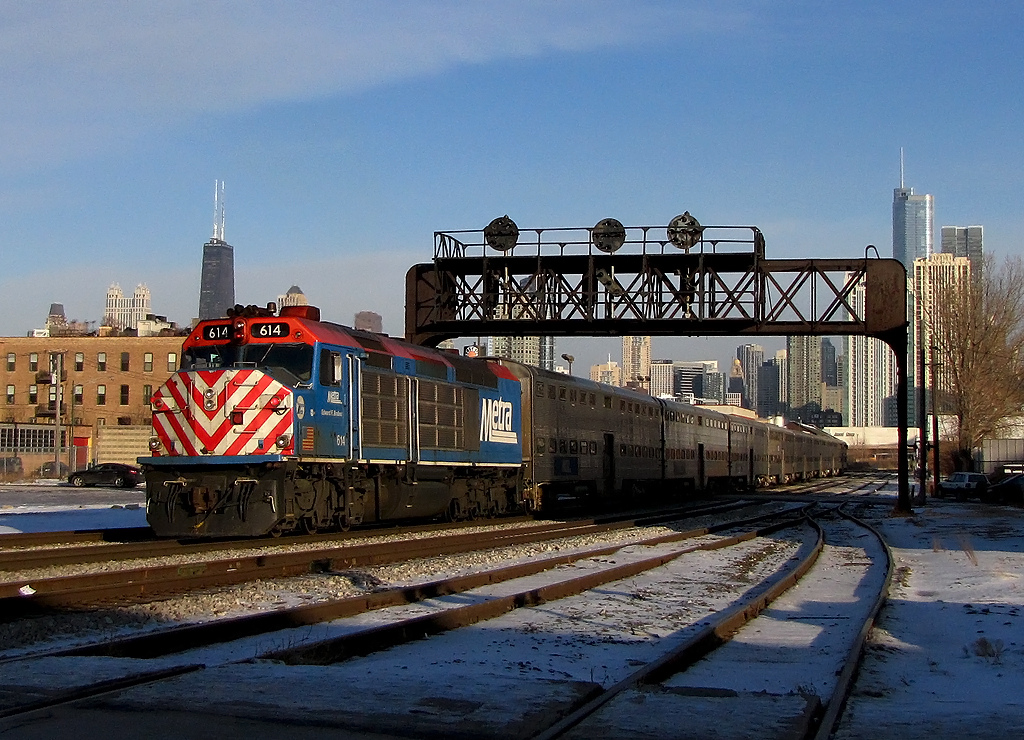
Metra EMD F40C No. 614 in Chicago

The board of the RTA Commuter Rail Division first met in 1984. In an effort to simplify the operation of commuter rail in the Chicago area, in July 1985 it adopted a unified brand for the entire system–Metra, or Metropolitan Rail. The newly reorganized Metra service helped to bring a single identity to the many infrastructure components serviced by the Regional Transportation Authority's commuter rail system. However, the system is still legally known as the Commuter Rail Division of the RTA.

Today, Metra's operating arm, the Northeast Illinois Regional Commuter Railroad Corporation, operates seven Metra owned routes. Four other routes continue to be operated by Union Pacific (formerly Chicago & North Western) and BNSF (formerly Burlington Northern) under contract to Metra. Service throughout the network is provided under the Metra name (in keeping with Metra's goal of providing a single identity for all commuter rail in the region). Metra also owns all rolling stock, controls fares and staffing levels, and is responsible for most of the stations. However, the freight carriers who operate routes under contract use their own employees and control the right-of-way for those routes.

In 2023, the Union Pacific Railroad announced plans to transfer operations of the three Union Pacific lines to Metra by the first quarter of 2024 with Union Pacific continuing to own and maintain the right-of-way. After many delays, the actual transfer was finally completed in May 2025 with the only thing left to negotiate was the track usage and other related fees. The fees negotiations were still not completed by the end of 2025.

=== Growth and expansion ===
In the late 20th and early 21st centuries, Metra experienced record ridership and expanded its services. In 1996, Metra organized its first new line, the North Central Service, running from Union Station to Antioch. By 2006, it added new intermediate stops to that same route, extended the Union Pacific West Line from Geneva to Elburn and extended SouthWest Service from Orland Park to Manhattan. In 2012, it boasted 95.8% average on-time performance (measured only for a train's arrivals at its last station no more than six minutes late). It also posted its fourth highest volume in its history despite decreases in employment opportunities in downtown Chicago.

Metra continued to seek expansion options and to improve passenger service. Over the past three decades, Metra has invested more than $5 billion into its infrastructure. That investment has been used to purchase new rolling stock, build new stations, renovate tracks, modernize signal systems and upgrade support facilities. In addition to core improvements on the Union Pacific Northwest and Union Pacific West Lines, planning advanced on two new Metra routes, SouthEast Service and the Suburban Transit Access Route ("STAR" Line). In 2023, Metra announced plans to extend the Milwaukee District West Line to Rockford, Illinois, with intermediate stops at Huntley and Belvidere, by 2027. In August 2024, Metra ran hourly shuttles on the North Central Service between O'Hare International Airport and Union Station during the Democratic National Convention, leading some to question whether more frequent service to O'Hare could be permanently obtained. Such an agreement would require contracts with the two freight railroads - Canadian National, which owns some of the NCS track, and CPKC, which dispatches trains on another portion of the route. Additionally, improved service to O'Hare would likely require major infrastructure upgrades to track, sidings, crossovers, and flyovers, with the potential for dedicated rolling stock another consideration.

=== Corruption ===
Metra also has been marred by allegations and investigations of corruption. In April 2002, board member Don Udstuen resigned from both Metra and his executive job with the Illinois State Medical Society, after admitting to taking bribes to steer Metra contracts to firms associated with former legislator Roger Stanley and pleading guilty to his part in Illinois's Operation Safe Road scandal.

In April 2010, Metra's executive director, Phil Pagano, faced investigation for taking an unauthorized $56,000 bonus and was later found to have improperly received $475,000 in vacation pay. The day that the agency's board was scheduled to discuss his fate, Pagano stepped in front of a moving Metra train in an apparent suicide. Around the time of Pagano's death, allegations also surfaced that a Metra employee demanded a $2,000 payoff from the studio that used Metra in the 2011 film Source Code. That employee was later relieved of his duties, and retired.

In June 2013, Metra CEO Alex Clifford abruptly resigned his position with no public comment. It was later reported that his exit had been demanded by the Metra board, which negotiated an $871,000 severance package including a non-disclosure agreement. Clifford's ouster was allegedly arranged because he rejected requests for patronage hiring and promotion, including a request to promote a longtime supporter of State Representative Michael Madigan. In the wake of this scandal, five board members resigned. In August 2013, the remaining board members unanimously elected Don Orseno as interim CEO. (The six-member board was operating with reduced membership and thus lacked the authority to elect a permanent CEO. Orseno and Alex Wiggins shared duties as co-executive directors.) Orseno's long railroad career, beginning with work to set up trains and check doors for the Chicago, Rock Island and Pacific Railroad played favorably in the board's decision. By October 2013, local officials had restored Metra's board to 11 members. After reviewing four candidates, the re-constituted board formally appointed Orseno CEO of Metra in January 2014. In 2014, "a lengthy history of political patronage hiring at" Metra was reported, based on past files.

=== Underfunding ===
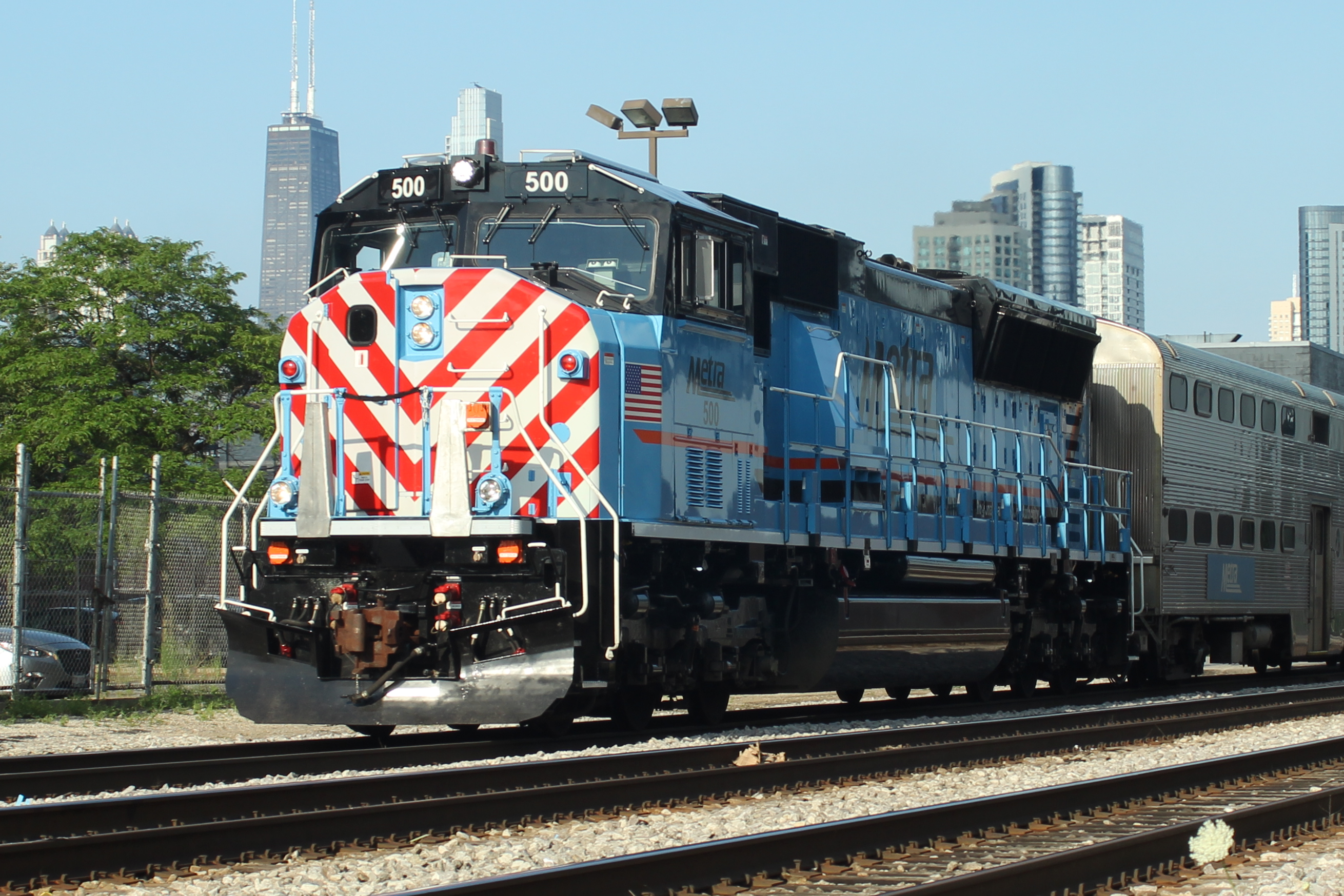
Metra purchased used, re-purposed freight locomotives known as the SD70MACH to cost-effectively address its aging fleet

For a long time, Metra was not being funded enough to keep most equipment and rolling stock up to date. On average, the agency received approximately $700 million a year, but Metra claims to need about $2 billion a year, which only since 2020 has been accomplished. Because of this, Metra had to cut back on new rolling stock, instead resorting to their Rebuild Programs, in which they rebuild railcars and locomotives with newer state of the art utilities. Rebuilds cost only a fraction as much as buying new rolling stock, such as with their Amerail built cars. Rebuild programs can rebuild aging cars for approximately $650,000, whereas buying that same railcar new would be approximately $3 million.

=== Metra under NITA ===
Metra will acquire Stadler FLIRT battery-electric multiple units to implement regional rail on the Beverly branch

On September 1, 2026, Metra's parent agency, the Regional Transportation Authority (RTA), was officially replaced by the new Northern Illinois Transit Authority (NITA). The creation of NITA is part of the implementation of state legislation (NITA Act, SB 2111) signed into law in December 2025. The NITA Act addresses underfunding and service coordination issues Metra and its peer agencies CTA and Pace have dealt with for years. NITA will receive $1.2 billion more in operating funds than what the RTA received. NITA will assume full authority to set fares, undertake service planning, manage and planning for capital projects, and link the distribution of operating funds to Metra with service outcomes. Metra will continue to have full control of day-to-day operations. The NITA Act also calls out specific tasks for Metra and its partners which include:

- Launch a regional rail pilot on the Rock Island District by 2027;
- Study extending the Metra Electric District to Kankakee;
- Assist IDOT in studying improvements to the Joliet Gateway Center to accommodate future service to Peoria;
- End the non-compete agreement with the South Shore Line, allowing people to use South Shore Line trains to travel between Metra Electric stations.

In addition to the initiatives required by the NITA Act, Metra has a long-term goal of moving to a regional rail model of operation and away from a commuter rail model of operation in response to changing ridership habits as a result of the COVID-19 pandemic. In October 2026, Metra released its draft Systemwide Network Plan for public review, which outlines how it plans to implement regional rail. The draft plan includes regional rail corridor summaries for all lines, except the Hertiage Corridor, and introduces a new proposed crosstown service between O'Hare Transfer and 80th Avenue/Tinley Park (with an option to also travel on the BNSF Line) via through-running at Chicago Union Station.

== Operations ==
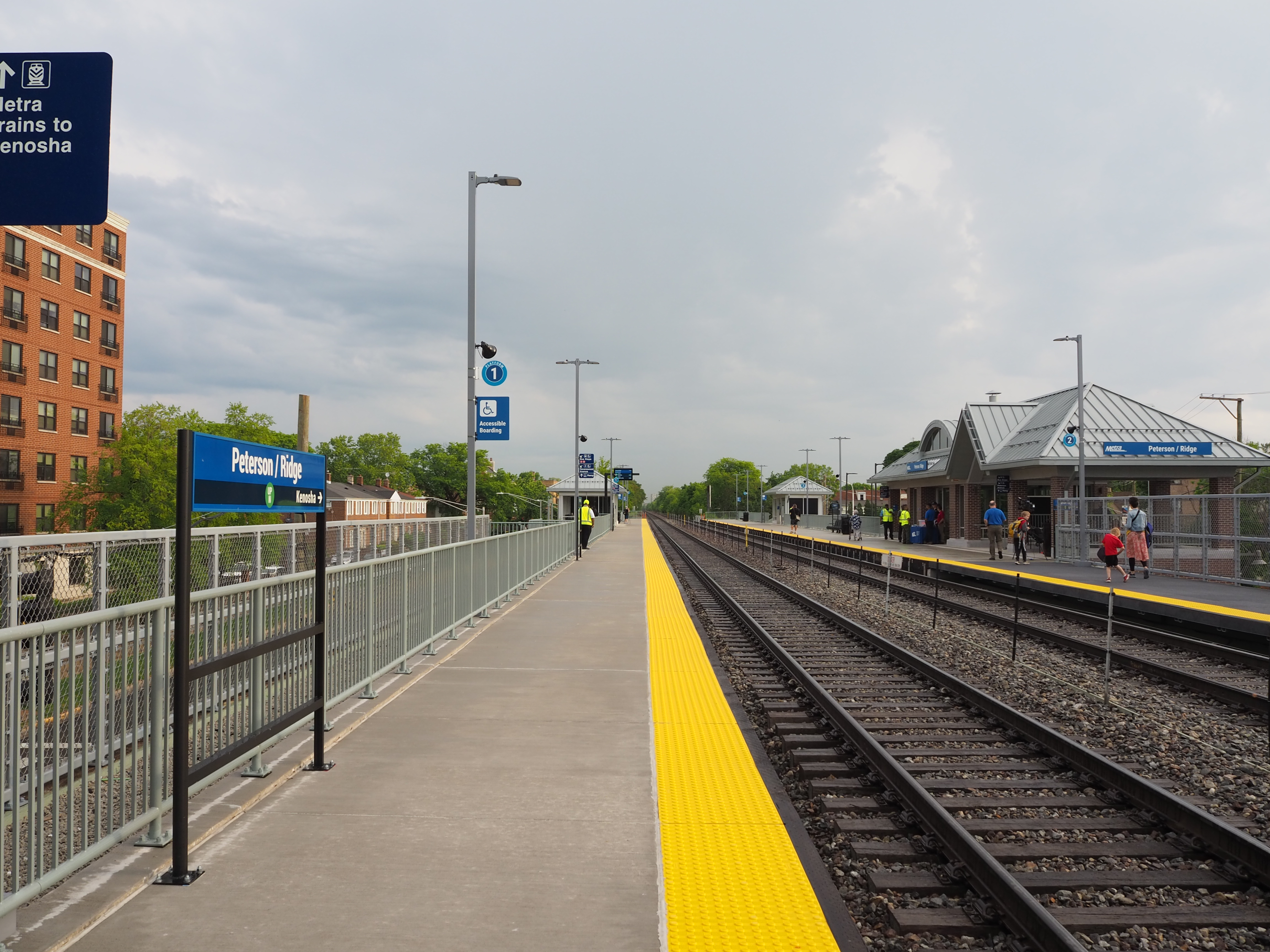
Peterson/Ridge, the newest station on the Metra system.

=== Stations ===
Metra serves passengers through stations throughout the Chicago metropolitan area. Each station, unless a route or branch terminus, provides travel toward (inbound) and away from (outbound) downtown Chicago. Therefore, a passenger can connect between the city and a suburb or between two points in the suburbs using Metra service. Although Metra's commuter rail system is designed to connect points all over the Chicago metropolitan area, it does provide some intracity connections within Chicago.

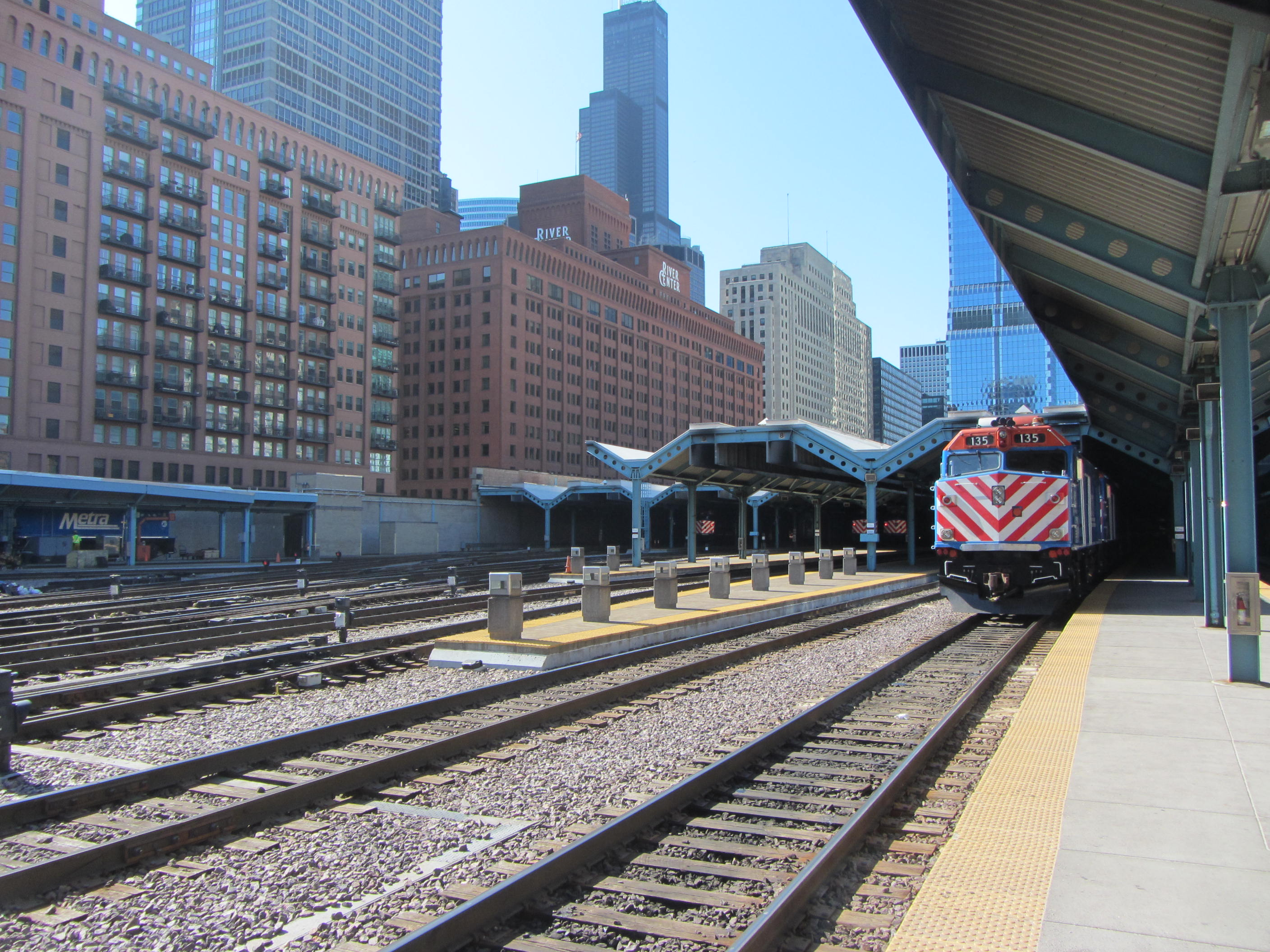
Metra trains at Ogilvie Transportation Center

Metra trains originate from one of four stations in downtown Chicago. Six lines originate at Union Station. The three Union Pacific lines originate at Ogilvie Transportation Center, formerly and still popularly called North Western Station. The Rock Island District originates at LaSalle Street Station. The Metra Electric District originates at Millennium Station, formerly and still often called Randolph Street Terminal. All four terminals are situated within walking distance of the Chicago Loop, so Metra passengers can easily transfer to a different Metra line upon their arrival downtown. Metra's urban-centric service remains popular with suburban commuters working downtown, reverse commuters, and those who visit Chicago for recreational activities and tourism.

Stations are found throughout Chicago, as well as in suburban Cook, DuPage, Kane, Lake, McHenry, and Will counties—an area largely coextensive with the inner ring of the Chicago metropolitan area. One station is located in Kenosha, Wisconsin, making it the only station located outside the NITA service area.

=== Routes ===
Metra operates on 11 lines, most of which date from the mid-19th century. One line (the BNSF Line) is operated under a purchase-of-service agreement and is operated by BNSF Railway. The other ten lines are operated by the Northeast Illinois Regional Commuter Rail Corporation (NIRC), Metra's operating subsidiary; eight of these primarily run over track owned by other railroads, while two (the Electric and Rock Island districts) run entirely on Metra-owned track. The three lines out of Ogilvie Transportation Center (formerly North Western Station) were operated by the Union Pacific Railroad until 2025. Inbound trains on every line at all times run through to their Chicago terminus, however, many outbound trains do not run through to their respective lines' terminus (for example, most trains on the UP-NW do not run through to Harvard, instead terminating at Crystal Lake).

Routes are named either by their private freight rail operator, their historical rail operator or corridor, their direction in relation to downtown Chicago, or their power source. A route's color is usually in reference to a historical passenger train service.

In March 2025, Metra launched a survey to begin the process of re-naming and re-coloring all of its lines using a unified and consistent structure. Its two main proposals include the Cardinal Direction System, which will group lines based on cardinal directions (using the prefixes "N", "W", or "S" followed by a number) in relation to downtown Chicago and color them based on their downtown terminal, and the 'M' for Metra System, which will give all lines the prefix "M" followed a number 1 through 14 and color them all the same color. In both proposals, the branches of the Rock Island and Metra Electric would become separate lines, whereas the UP-NW's McHenry branch will remain part of the main line. Metra expects to complete the roll-out of new names and signs by early 2029.

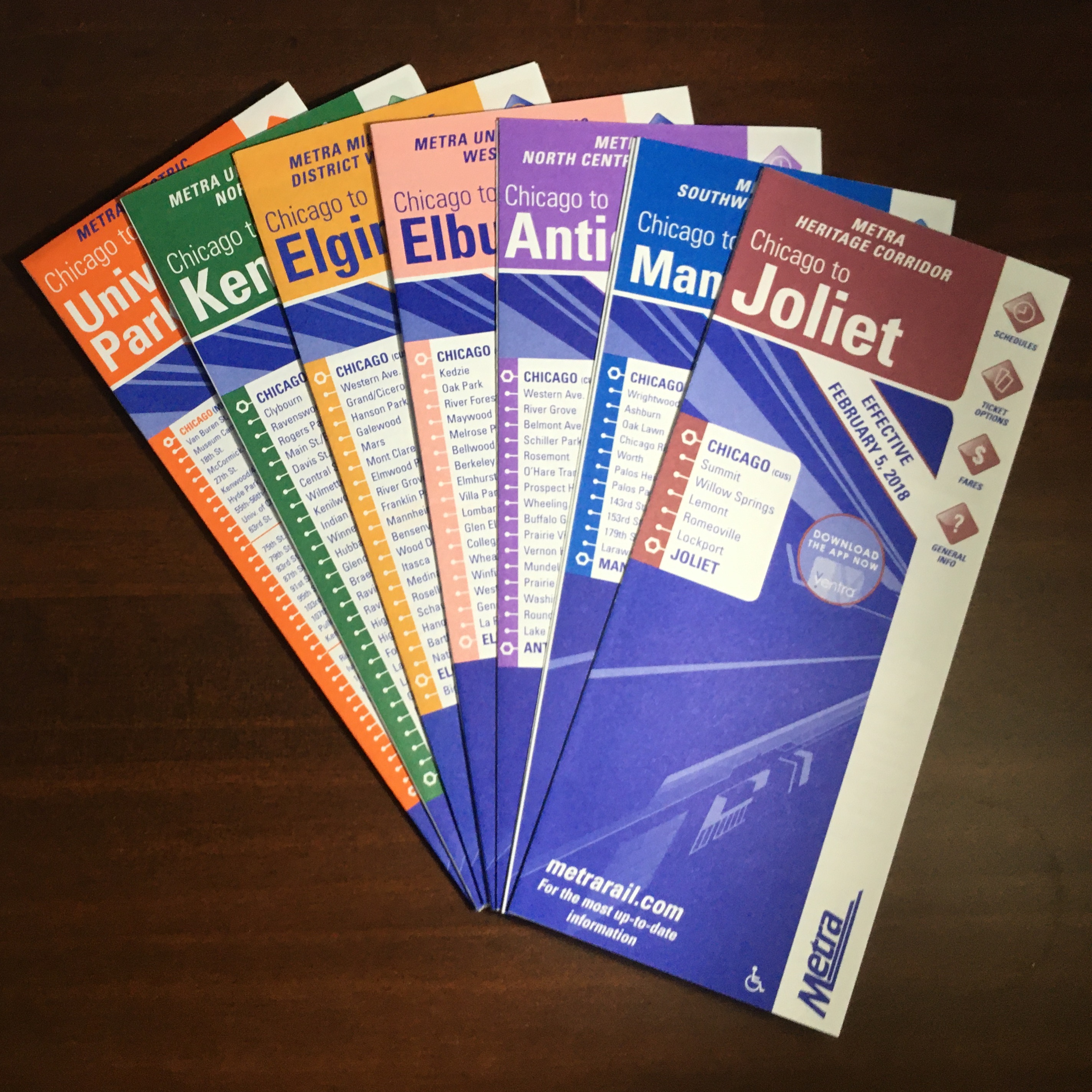
Various timetables (2018–19)

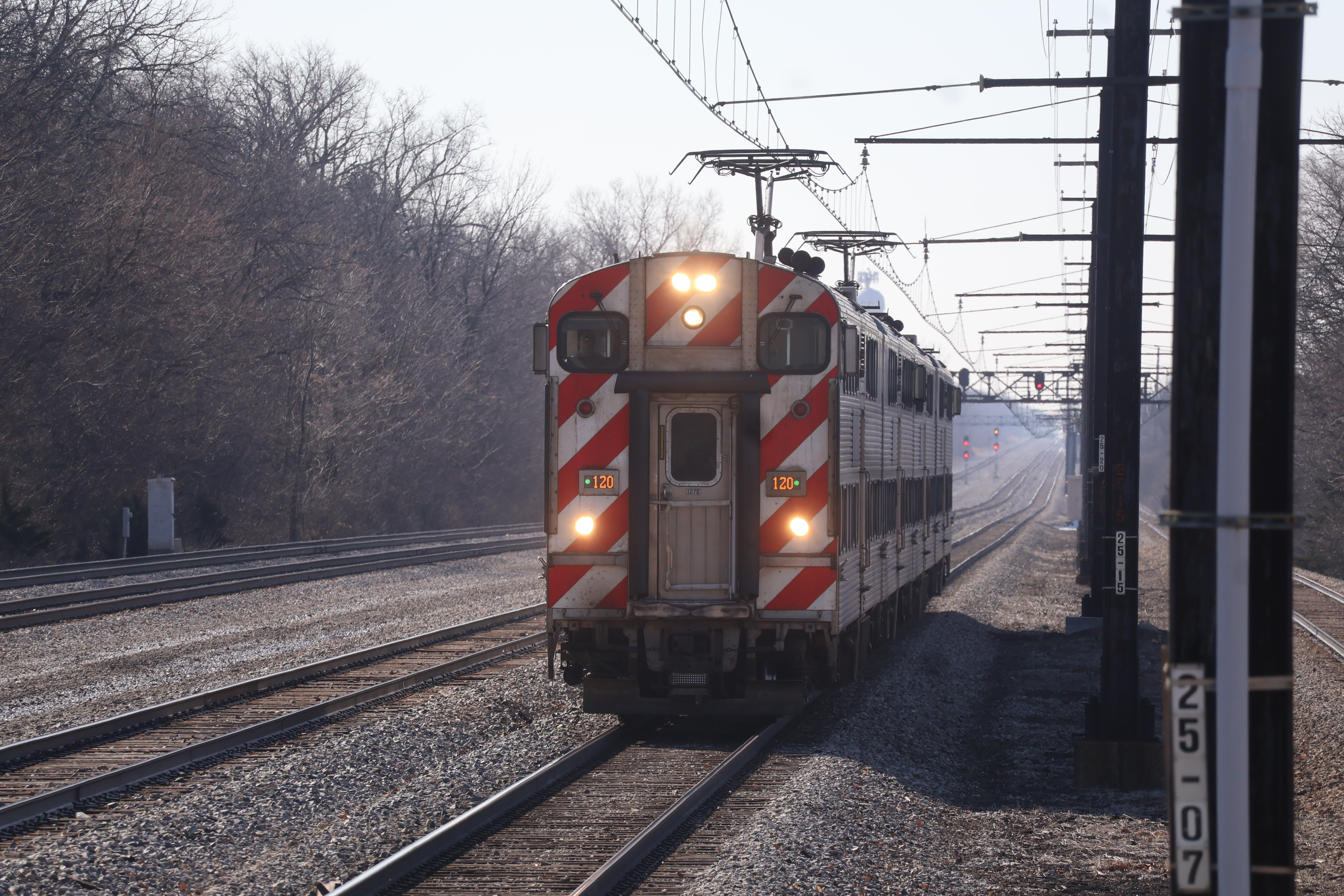
Metra Electric Highliner II

BNSF Line

The BNSF Line is a 37.5-mile (60.4 km) route from Chicago Union Station to the Aurora Transportation Center in Aurora, Illinois. It had an average of 63,000 weekday passenger trips in 2018–2019, making Metra's busiest line. It is operated by BNSF Railway through a purchase-of-service agreement.

Heritage Corridor

The Heritage Corridor (HC) is a 37.2-mile (59.9 km) route from Chicago Union Station to the Joliet Gateway Center in Joliet, Illinois during weekday rush hours only in the peak direction. It had an average of 2,600 weekday passenger trips in 2018–2019, making it Metra's least-busiest line.

Metra Electric District

The Metra Electric District (MED) is a 31.5-mile (50.7 km) electrically-powered route from Millennium Station to University Park, Illinois, with an additional 9.1 miles (14.6 km) of branch lines serving Blue Island (except Sundays and holidays) and 93rd Street/South Chicago. The line had an average of 28,100 passenger weekday trips in 2018–2019. As mandated by the NITA Act (SB 2111), Metra will study extending the MED to Kankakee, Illinois.

Milwaukee District North Line

The Milwaukee District North Line (MD-N) is a 49.5-mile (79.7 km) route from Chicago Union Station to Fox Lake, Illinois. The line had an average of 22,100 weekday passenger trips in 2018–2019.

Milwaukee District West Line

The Milwaukee District West Line (MD-W) is a 39.8-mile (64.1 km) route from Chicago Union Station to Big Timber Road in Elgin, Illinois; on weekends and holidays, service terminates at the Elgin Transportation Center in downtown Elgin. The line had an average of 20,600 weekday passenger trips in 2018–2019.

North Central Service

The North Central Service (NCS) is a 52.8-mile (85.0 km) route from Chicago Union Station to Antioch, Illinois. It had an average of 5,600-weekday passenger trips in 2018–2019. It does not run at all on weekends and holidays. The NCS has a station that serves O'Hare International Airport (ORD).

Rock Island District

The Rock Island District (RI) is a 40.0-mile (64.4 km) route (not inclusive of the 6.6-mile (10.6 km) Beverly Branch) to the southwest and southern suburbs. The line has 26 stations on two branches from LaSalle Street Station to the Joliet Gateway Center in Joliet, Illinois. Some trains branch off onto a local track and terminate at Blue Island/Vermont Street. It had an average of 26,900 weekday passenger trips in 2018–2019. Metra plans to debut its new Stadler FLIRT equipment on the Beverly Branch in 2027-2028.

SouthWest Service

The SouthWest Service (SWS) is a 40.8-mile (65.7 km) route from Chicago Union Station to Manhattan, Illinois, though most trains end at 179th Street/Orland Park in Orland Park, Illinois. It had an average of 9,600-weekday passenger trips in 2018–2019. It does not run at all on Sundays and holidays, and Saturday service is currently suspended. Metra plans to eventually move SWS trains from Chicago Union Station to LaSalle Street Station as part of the CREATE 75th Street Corridor Improvement Project.

Union Pacific North Line

The Union Pacific North Line (UP-N) is a 51.6-mile (83.0 km) route from Ogilvie Transportation Center to Kenosha, Wisconsin, making it the only Metra line that travels outside of Illinois and outside the NITA service area. Most trains, however, end in Waukegan, Illinois. The line had an average of 34,600 weekday passenger trips in 2018–2019, making Metra's third-busiest line. There is a seasonal stop that serves the Ravinia Festival.

Union Pacific Northwest Line

The Union Pacific Northwest Line (UP-NW) is a 63.2-mile (101.7 km) route from Ogilvie Transportation Center to Harvard, Illinois, with most trains ending in Crystal Lake, Illinois. During weekdays except for holidays, service also includes a 7.59-mile (12.21 km) branch line to McHenry, Illinois. The line had an average of 40,100 weekday passenger trips in 2018–2019. It is Metra's longest line and second-busiest line

Union Pacific West Line

The Union Pacific West Line (UP-W) is a 43.6-mile (70.2 km) route running from Ogilvie Transportation Center to Elburn, Illinois. The line had an average of 27,900 weekday passenger trips in 2018–2019. There have been ongoing efforts to extend the line to DeKalb, Illinois.

==== New routes in development ====
In 2023, the Illinois Department of Transportation selected Metra as the agency to run restored rail service to Rockford. New stations will be built in Belvidere and Rockford. There were plans for a station in Huntley, but the village government backed out of the project in October 2025. The new route will share tracks with the Milwaukee District West Line from Chicago to Elgin, but will run as a separate service. Construction is scheduled to begin in Spring 2026, with a service start date of 2027.

View of one of the existing through-running tracks at Chicago Union Station

In October 2026, as part of its draft Systemwide Network Plan for regional rail, Metra has introduced a new proposed crosstown service that would run between O'Hare Transfer on the North Central Service and 80th Avenue/Tinley Park on the Rock Island District. This was in response to public feedback desiring travel on Metra without having to transfer downtown. The Metra Electric was considered as another southern leg, but was passed over in favor of the RI due infrastructure compatibility reasons. Metra says that crosstown service would require $5.1 billion in infrastructure investments such as constructing additional through-running tracks at Chicago Union Station, a new connection between Union Station and the RI, additional rail cars and signals, among other needs. An alternative routing using the BNSF Line for service between O'Hare and Aurora is also being considered pending additional infrastructure requirements.

==== Other proposed routes ====
Metra proposed two routes in the early 2000s: the SouthEast Service (SES), which would connect some portions of the southern suburbs with downtown Chicago; and the Suburban Transit Access Route (STAR Line), which would connect various suburbs with each other without going into downtown. As of 2020, only the SouthEast Service is still being considered.

In August 2024, Metra operated a temporary pilot project where it ran daily and hourly train service from Union Station to O'Hare Transfer station on the North Central Service. It coincided with the 2024 Democratic National Convention. Metra plans to use the findings of the pilot project to explore the idea of launching a dedicated, frequent O'Hare Airport Express Service.

On December 16, 2025, Illinois Governor JB Pritzker signed the Northern Illinois Transit Authority Act (NITA, SB 2111) into law. A provision of the new law requires Metra to launch a study to explore the possibility of extending the Metra Electric District to Kankakee.

==== Pre-Metra routes ====
Several commuter lines were discontinued before Metra was established. The Illinois Central West Line from present-day Millennium Station to Addison, Illinois, (closed 1931), Pennsylvania Railroad line to Valparaiso, Indiana, (closed 1935), New York Central line from LaSalle Street Station to Elkhart, Indiana, (closed 1964), and four Chicago & North Western lines to St. Charles, Aurora, Freeport, and Kenosha-Harvard (all municipalities in Illinois and Wisconsin, closed 1930–51). The Burlington Route had service between Aurora and West Chicago, Illinois (closed 1943). Chicago Eastern Illinois operated commuter service on this line out of Dearborn Station to Dolton and Momence, respectively. The Chicago and Eastern Illinois commuter line to Momence, Illinois, ended in 1935, while the Chicago and Western Indiana service to Dolton, Illinois, was discontinued in 1964. Chicago Great Western had commuter service to DeKalb, Illinois (closed 1906). Santa Fe service to Joliet, Illinois (closed 1903). However, Metra runs service to Joliet, Illinois, on two routes: Heritage Corridor and Rock Island District.

=== Ridership ===
Ridership has been slowly declining on all but one line since 2014, as seen below. The figures post-2020 have been drastically affected by the ongoing COVID-19 pandemic. Though monthly reports from 2024 show heavy improvement over 2021 figures, they are still below pre-pandemic levels. Peak-direction ridership is at only 56% of pre-pandemic ridership, while other types of weekday travel are between 80% and 95% recovery rates. Systemwide, Saturday and Sunday ridership has fully recovered to pre-pandemic numbers.

==== Annual ridership ====
Annual ridership by line
Line	2014	2015	2016	2017	2018	2019	2020	2021	2022	2023	2024	2025
BNSF Line	16,658,357	16,400,290	16,325,320	16,235,817	15,822,652	15,468,014	3,659,617	2,483,782	4,509,000	6,171,000	6,849,000	7,580,000
Heritage Corridor	729,139	723,803	718,015	727,202	728,467	734,098	177,838	82,197	183,000	253,000	288,000	342,000
Milwaukee District North Line	7,237,913	7,094,564	6,934,684	6,818,808	6,610,059	6,549,143	1,556,783	1,094,292	1,908,000	2,846,000	3,161,000	3,488,000
Milwaukee District West Line	6,946,268	6,771,637	6,621,104	6,349,963	6,143,996	5,904,808	1,480,973	1,059,742	1,729,000	2,307,000	2,544,000	2,791,000
Metra Electric District	9,415,916	9,054,649	8,642,365	8,149,977	7,716,121	7,282,993	2,019,403	1,836,723	3,140,000	3,888,000	3,760,000	3,700,000
North Central Service	1,817,335	1,758,118	1,730,494	1,684,357	1,640,984	1,589,905	340,682	146,668	325,000	536,000	608,000	669,000
Rock Island District	8,544,753	8,305,273	8,112,784	7,923,588	7,578,330	7,338,133	1,952,547	1,669,273	2,610,000	3,066,000	3,159,000	3,375,000
SouthWest Service	2,659,040	2,604,292	2,538,273	2,457,418	2,420,921	2,356,767	574,815	305,167	557,000	845,000	977,000	1,114,000
Union Pacific North Line	9,328,441	9,248,834	9,220,477	9,030,120	8,689,776	8,552,117	2,300,363	1,954,284	3,069,000	4,418,000	4,831,000	5,246,000
Union Pacific Northwest Line	11,609,358	11,301,755	11,183,739	10,910,882	10,597,680	10,384,356	2,602,403	1,962,084	3,287,000	4,633,000	5,182,000	5,737,000
Union Pacific West Line	8,423,188	8,367,264	8,375,067	8,332,483	8,139,344	7,883,185	1,945,886	1,486,536	2,411,000	3,293,000	3,692,000	4,050,000
Total	83,369,706	81,630,476	80,402,319	78,620,612	76,088,329	74,043,156	18,611,311	14,080,749	23,728,000	31,988,000	35,052,000	38,091,000

Annual ridership by year
Year	Ridership
2008	86,806,452
2009	82,284,563
2010	81,378,384
2011	82,626,562
2012	81,368,285
2013	82,267,348
2014	83,369,706
2015	81,630,476
2016	80,402,319
2017	78,620,612
2018	76,088,329
2019	74,043,516
2020	18,611,311
2021	14,080,749
2022	23,728,000
2023	31,988,000
2024	35,052,000
2025	38,091,000

=== Connections ===
Newly installed bike rack inside a Metra gallery coach car

Transportation in Chicago consists of a public transportation infrastructure allowing for intermodal connections to local, regional, national and international transportation services. Parking lots are available adjacent to most suburban Metra stations for passengers connecting with their train by car. Most parking lots are operated by the municipality they are located in. Fees and fines are also assessed by the local municipality; however, parking is usually free on weekends and most holidays. Since 2024, Metra has allowed bikes all of its trains regardless of the time of day, however, conductors continue to reserve the right to deny bikes for reasons such as overcrowding.

NITA's two other service boards, the Chicago Transit Authority (CTA) and Pace Suburban Bus, connect with many Metra stations in downtown Chicago and in the suburbs. NITA coordinates fares, schedules, and service standards for all three service boards in order to ensure regional coordination and integration. Metra schedules will be designed to allow for timed connections to CTA and Pace buses and "L" trains, and vice versa.

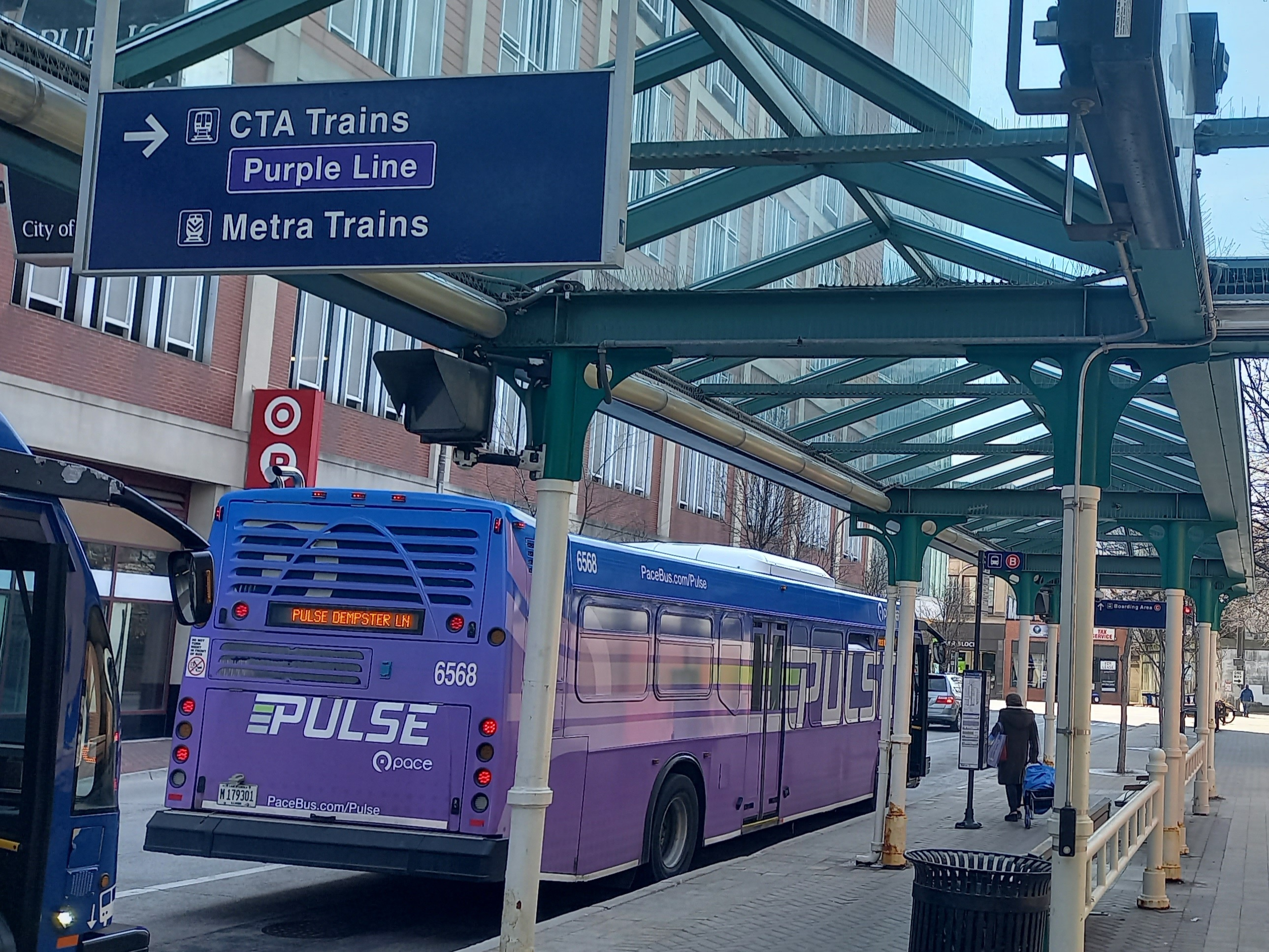
The Davis Street/Evanston station on the UP-N has connections to Pace and CTA buses, and the CTA Purple Line.

The CTA's Chicago "L" rapid transit system has transfers with Metra at some Chicago stations. Most "L" lines traverse the Loop allowing nearby access to all downtown Metra terminals. There are also transfer points between Metra and the "L" outside of the Loop, such as transfers from the Union Pacific Northwest Line to the Blue Line at Irving Park and Jefferson Park Transit Center; from the Union Pacific North Line to the Purple Line at Evanston Davis Street; and from the Union Pacific West Line to the Green Line at Oak Park. "L" trains announce downtown Metra connections on board when announcing the next "L" stop.

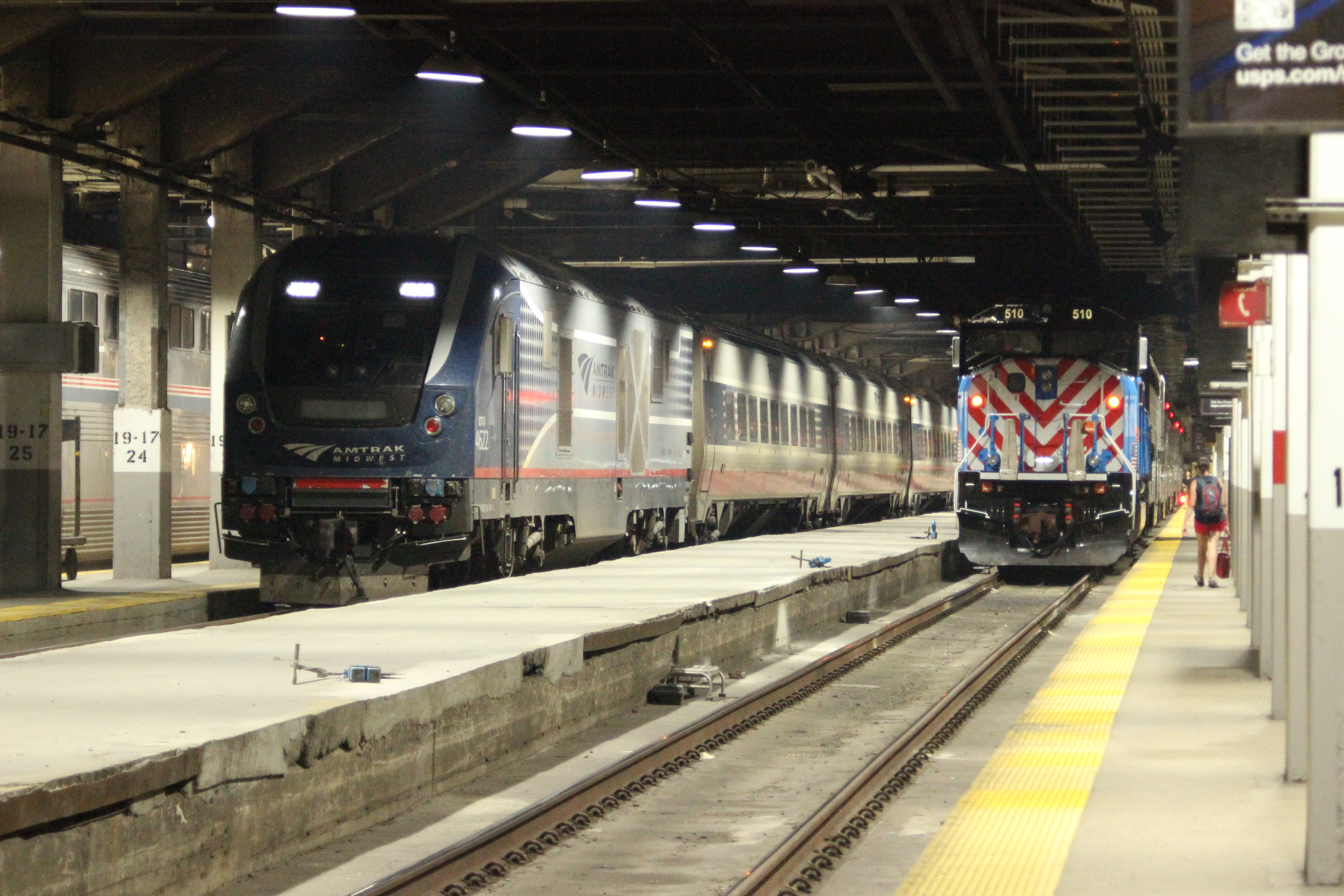
Amtrak and Metra trains at Chicago Union Station

Union Station doubles as both a Metra station and Amtrak's station in Chicago. In addition to Illinois Service and Hiawatha, Amtrak trains run nationwide including service to states spanning both coastlines. Passengers connecting from Ogilvie Transportation Center can access Union Station through its north platforms on the opposite side of Madison Street, with Millennium and LaSalle stations also within a short walking distance of Union Station as well. A number of suburban Metra stations are also shared with Amtrak as well. In addition, many intercity bus lines connect with passengers outside of Union Station.

The Northern Indiana Commuter Transportation District (NICTD) operates the South Shore Line, a two-route commuter and interurban rail service connecting Chicago with Northwest Indiana and South Bend. Its two routes, the Lakeshore Corridor and Monon Corridor, originate at Millennium Station and operate along much of the Chicago portion of the Electric District line, as far south as 115th Street/Kensington. The passage of the NITA Act (SB 2111) ended a long-standing non-compete agreement in which passengers were not allowed to use South Shore Line trains for travel between stations that are also served by Metra.

Many outlying terminal stations have connections to other public transit systems in nearby metropolitan areas. At Elburn station, there is connection to DeKalb Public Transit's Route 12, which provides service to DeKalb and Northern Illinois University. At Kenosha, several Kenosha Area Transit bus routes and the Kenosha streetcar serve the Metra station, along with Coach USA's Wisconsin Coach Lines commuter service to Racine and Milwaukee. University Park station was served by an express commuter bus operated by Kankakee's River Valley Metro MTD, but the route is currently suspended.

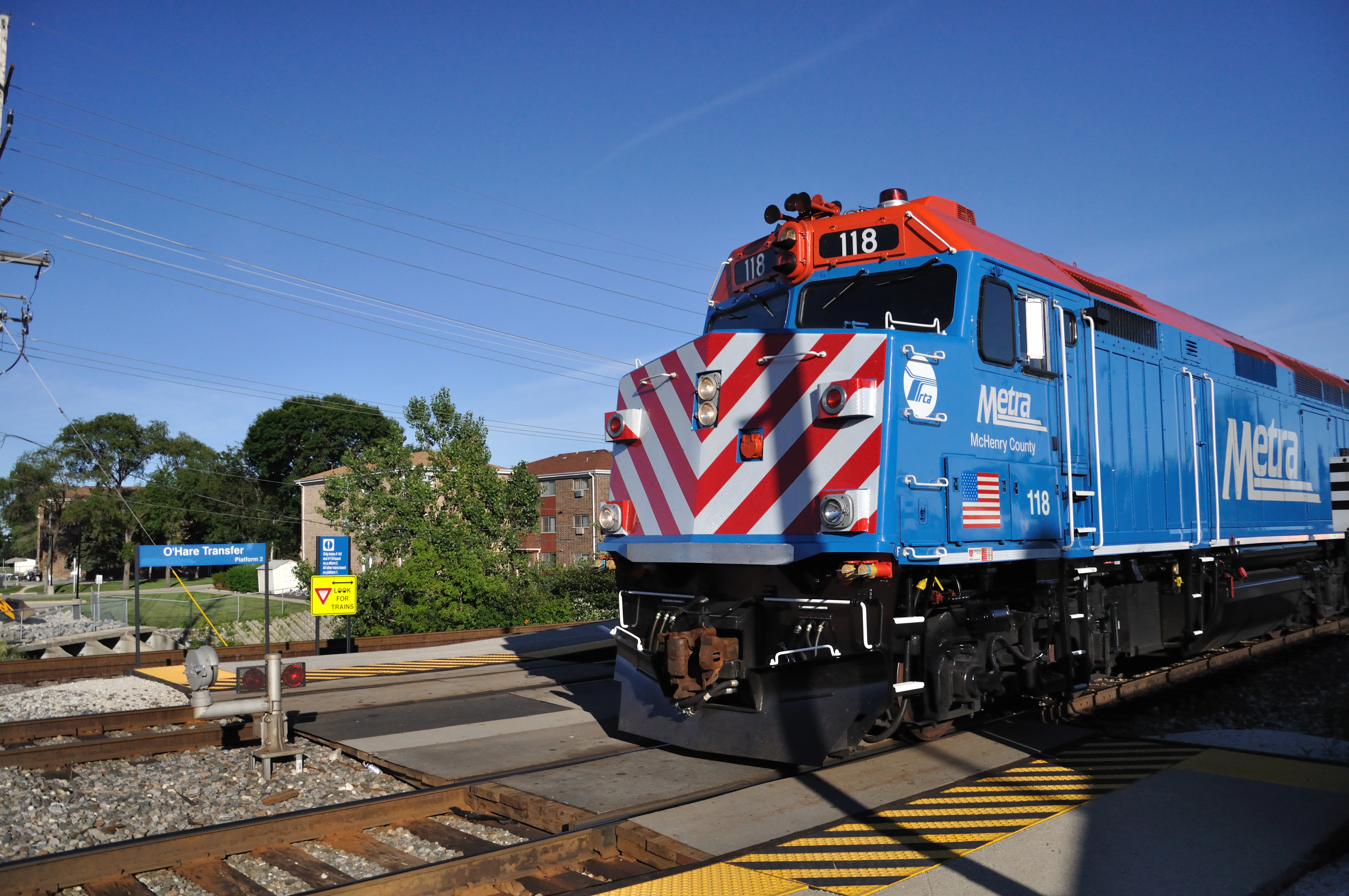
Metra train at the O'Hare Transfer station on the North Central Service

Metra serves Chicago's O'Hare International Airport through O'Hare Transfer station on the North Central Service, although primarily during weekday rush periods, and there is no service on weekends. There is no Metra station that directly serves Chicago's Midway International Airport. Alternatively, O'Hare and Midway Airports can be accessed via connections to the CTA's Blue and Orange Lines respectively.

=== Positive train control ===
In regards to the PTC mandate that passed Congress, Metra took steps to meet the deadline. Metra concluded that the December 31, 2015, mandate to have PTC running was an unreasonable requirement. This aligned with the stance taken by much of the railroad industry. This is due to a variety of factors including but not limited to: delays from the government, and the fundamental complexity of building a program from the ground up. Moreover, Metra estimates the cost of implementing the system on their 1,100 miles (1,800 km) of track in the Chicago region to be over $200 million. The fear is this unfunded mandate will divert scarce capital funds from other essential needs. This includes building and maintaining existing tracks, stations, signals, and other equipment that ensures a safe operating environment for all of Metra's passengers. However, Metra recognizes the need for PTC but needed a more reasonable timeline to implement such a program. This recognition is partially based on Metra's previous accident history. Two noteworthy events were a pair of accidents on the Rock Island District within a span of a couple of years. The first event was a derailment that occurred on October 12, 2003, when a train flew through a 10 mph crossing at 68 mph. A second very similar occurrence happened on September 17, 2005, but was more serious. The latter derailment killed two passengers and injured 117. Both of these incidents could have been prevented if PTC were in place. In both circumstances, PTC would have overridden the engineer and slowed the train down to the appropriate speed to prevent an accident from occurring.

Recently, Metra has taken significant steps in the process to fully implementing PTC. On April 22, 2015, the Metra board approved an $80 million contract to Parsons Transportation Group. Parsons was the sole bidder and speaks to the complexities of the project. They will be in charge of incorporating various devices from GPS, radio, to trackside antennas into one cohesive system. The group has some experience in this sector previously as Parsons worked with the southern California commuter rail agency Metrolink to install their system.

By the year 2020, Metra completed installation of the Positive Train Control. This came at a capital cost of $400 million and an annual operating cost of $20 million. Metra's PTC system works with the trains of 12 other railroad companies.

== Fare system and ticketing ==
Metra tickets can purchased from the Ventra mobile app, however, Ventra machines do not sell Metra tickets.

Fare is determined by the distance traveled by a passenger. Each station along every route has generally been placed in a specific zone (Zones 1 through 4) based on its distance from its respective downtown station. Multiple stations can be placed in the same zone even though they are on the same line.

=== Purchase methods and validation ===
Tickets can be purchased from the Ventra mobile app or dedicated Metra ticket vending machines at select stations using cash or card (Ventra machines do not sell Metra tickets). Certain ticket/pass types can only be purchased from the Ventra mobile app. Ventra transit cards are not accepted as Metra tickets, but transit value stored on cards can be used to pay for Metra tickets on the mobile app. One-way tickets can be purchased on-board from the conductor using cash. On February 1, 2024, Metra closed all staffed ticket windows across its entire system.

Passengers show their valid ticket (either on their smartphone from the Ventra app or paper ticket) to the conductor once on board. Metra does not use turnstiles, unlike CTA "L" trains.

=== Distanced-based zone system ===
On February 1, 2024, Metra reduced the number of fare zones from 10 to 4 and labeled each of the four zones by number instead of letter. This was proposed in an effort to simplify its fare structure. In addition, trips not entering or exiting the downtown area (zone 1) are subjected to a flat $3.75 fee.

Historically, the downtown terminals and stations in the vicinity of downtown were classified as zone 'A' and each additional zone represented an added 5 miles (8.0 km) from the downtown terminus. There were originally thirteen fare zones: zones A, B, C, D, E, F, G, H, I, J, K, and M (zone L would not have any stations since 1984 when Hartland station closed on the Northwest Line). Zones K and M were merged into zone J on July 15, 2018, reducing the number of zones to ten.

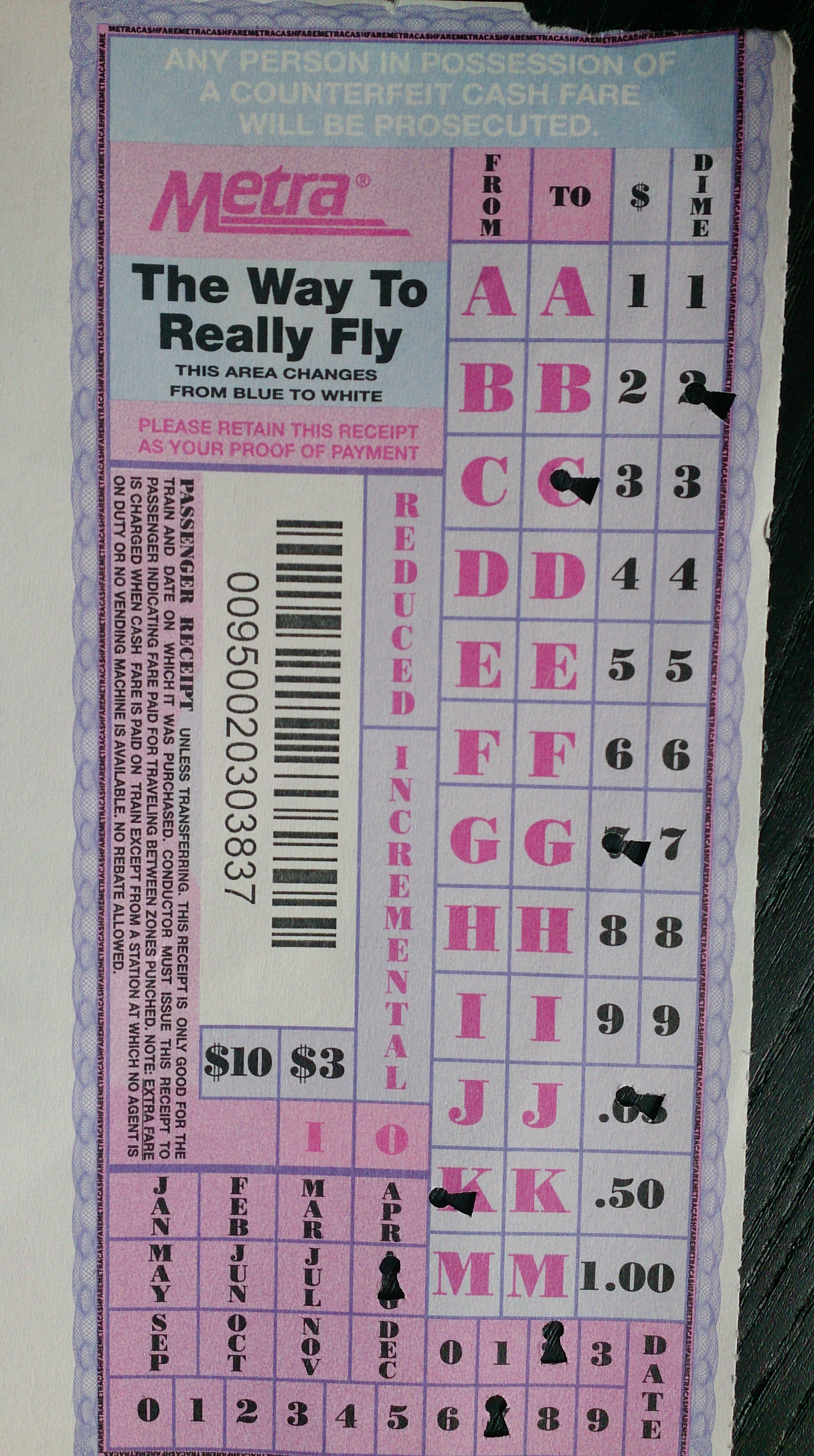
Metra one-way paper ticket, typically sold by on-board by conductors and paid with cash.

=== Tickets ===
Several ticketing options exist for passengers. Riders may choose to purchase one-way tickets, day passes, regional day passes, day pass five-packs, weekend passes, monthly passes, or regional connect passes.

- A one-way ticket is used for one-way travel between two stations. One-way tickets can be purchased from ticket vending machines at stations, from the Ventra app, or on the train from a conductor. Conductors will charge an extra $5 if a ticket machine was available at the passenger's departing station.
- A day pass provides unlimited rides on one calendar day for all stations in between two zones for twice the cost of a one-way ticket between those two zones. Day passes can be purchased in stations or in the Ventra app but are not for sale on board trains.
- A regional day pass (Ventra app only) is available for an additional $2.50 to full/reduced fare day pass holders and full/reduced fare Saturday, Sunday, or Holiday day pass holders. It allows for unlimited travel on the entire CTA and Pace systems and unlimited travel within the selected Metra zones (weekdays) or the entire Metra system (weekend days and holidays).
- A day pass five-pack (Ventra app only) provides five day passes between two zones determined at the time of purchase. Day pass five-packs can be shared between passengers and expire 90 days after the date of purchase. Day pass five-packs can only be purchased with the Ventra app.
- A Saturday, Sunday, or Holiday day pass provides unlimited travel between any and all zones for one passenger on a Saturday, Sunday, or certain holidays. Weekend day passes can be purchased in stations, on board trains (with no surcharge), or with the Ventra app. As of 2024, Saturday or Sunday weekend passes cost $7.
- A weekend pass (Ventra app only) provides unlimited travel between any and all zones for one passenger on a Saturday and Sunday. In the past, weekend passes were extended to include holidays adjacent to the weekend, but this practice seems to have ended. Weekend passes are only available within the Ventra app. As of 2024, weekend passes cost $10.
- A monthly pass provides unlimited travel between any two zones for one passenger on every day of a respective month. Monthly passes can be used on any line within the specified zones. Monthly passes can be purchased from ticket vending machines, or from the Ventra app.
- A regional connect pass (Ventra app only) is available for an additional $30 to monthly pass holders and allows for unlimited travel on the entire CTA and Pace system and the selected Metra zones. This replaced the former Pace PlusBus and CTA Link-Up.
- A U-Pass+ is a pilot fare program where students at the University of Illinois at Chicago (UIC) purchased an enhanced CTA U-Pass for a reduced fare price for unlimited travel on the CTA and Metra for the semester. Currently, U-Pass+ is not available to other participating colleges and universities other than UIC.

=== Reduced fare programs ===
Metra allows some travelers to purchase reduced fare tickets or even ride for free. These reduced fare and free ride programs are administered by Metra and NITA. Some pre-college students, youth, senior citizens, members of the United States Armed Forces and persons with disabilities may qualify for these programs. Time-based and geographical restrictions apply to these programs and passengers must ensure they qualify before attempting to purchase special tickets or ride for free. Cook County launched The Fair Transit pilot on January 4, 2021, scheduled to initially last for three years. Under the pilot, all riders on the Metra Electric and Rock Island lines will pay Metra's reduced fare rates.

On the Union Pacific North Line, passengers headed to an event at Ravinia Park may ride to the event for free after showing their Ravinia Festival e-ticket to the conductor.

=== Fare policy under NITA ===
Beginning September 1, 2026, the Northern Illinois Transit Authority (NITA) will assume full control over fare policy for Metra, along with the CTA and Pace. NITA plans to introduce fare capping and expand reduced fare programs with the aim of establishing a more unified regional fare system. The NITA Act mandates that a universal fare system must implemented by early 2030.

== Safety and security ==
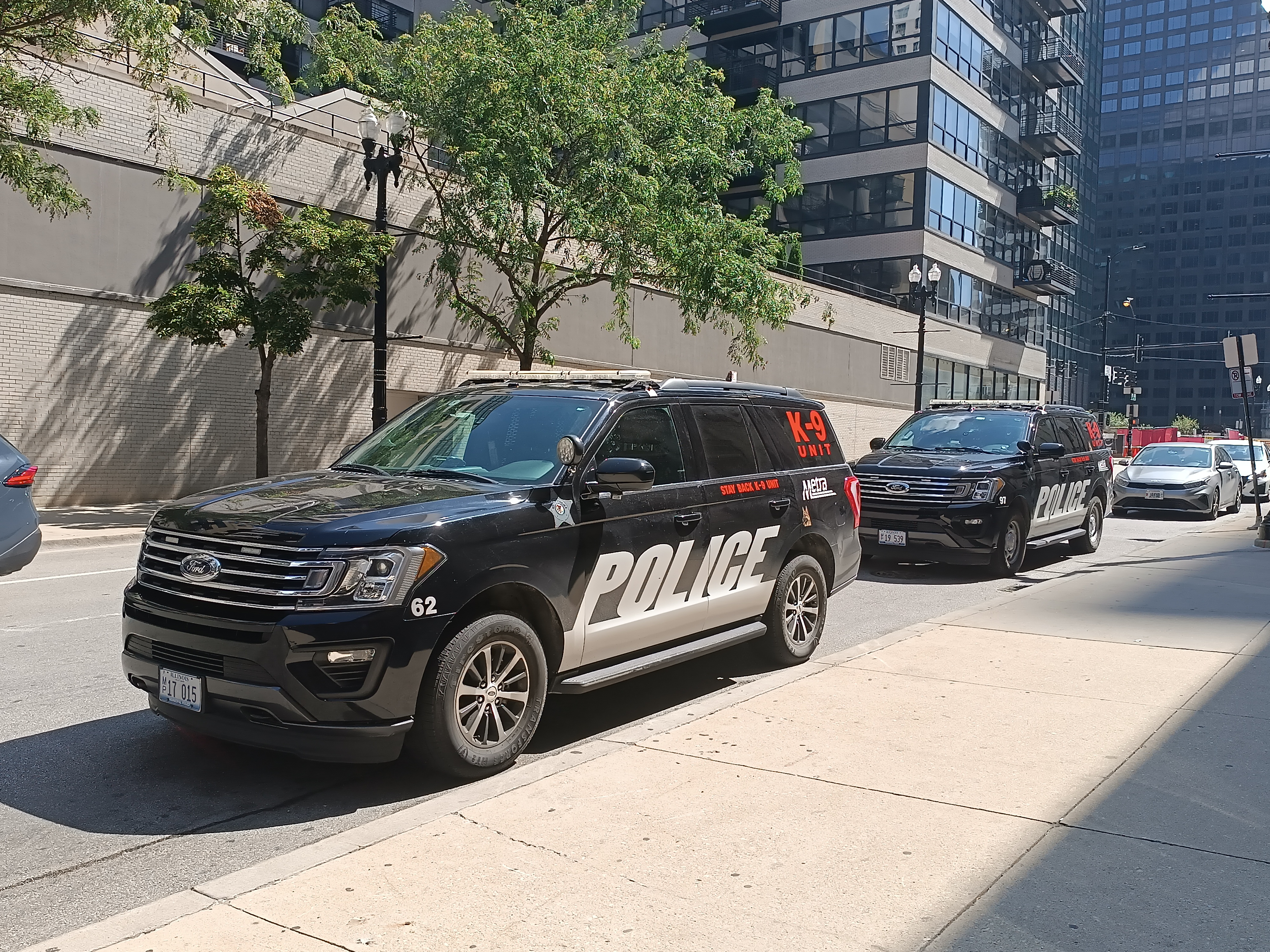
Metra police K-9 unit

Metra employees, the Metra Police Department and other public safety agencies are responsible for maintaining safety and security on its lines, aboard its trains and at stations all to various degrees. Although rail transport is one of the safest forms of land travel, compromises to Metra's safety and security can occur through pedestrian accidents, suicide attempts, vehicle collisions, derailment, terrorism and other incidents. Failing to maintain safety and security can result in equipment and infrastructure damage, extensive service disruptions, traumatic injuries and loss of life. Therefore, Metra and other agencies consider safety a top priority and dedicate a significant amount of resources to combat these dangers.

Starting in the early summer of 2013, Metra has announced plans to up police patrols on to the seven lines the agency operates: the Milwaukee Districts North and West, the North Central Service, the Heritage Corridor, South West Service, Rock Island, and Electric District. The police patrols will not be on the BNSF and Union Pacific train lines because those lines are operated by the railroads that own them and security falls to those companies. When asked why there were increasing patrols spokesman Michael Gillis said, "There is no particular reason, other than the fact that we want to be more proactive and more deliberately visible to our riders".

=== Law enforcement ===
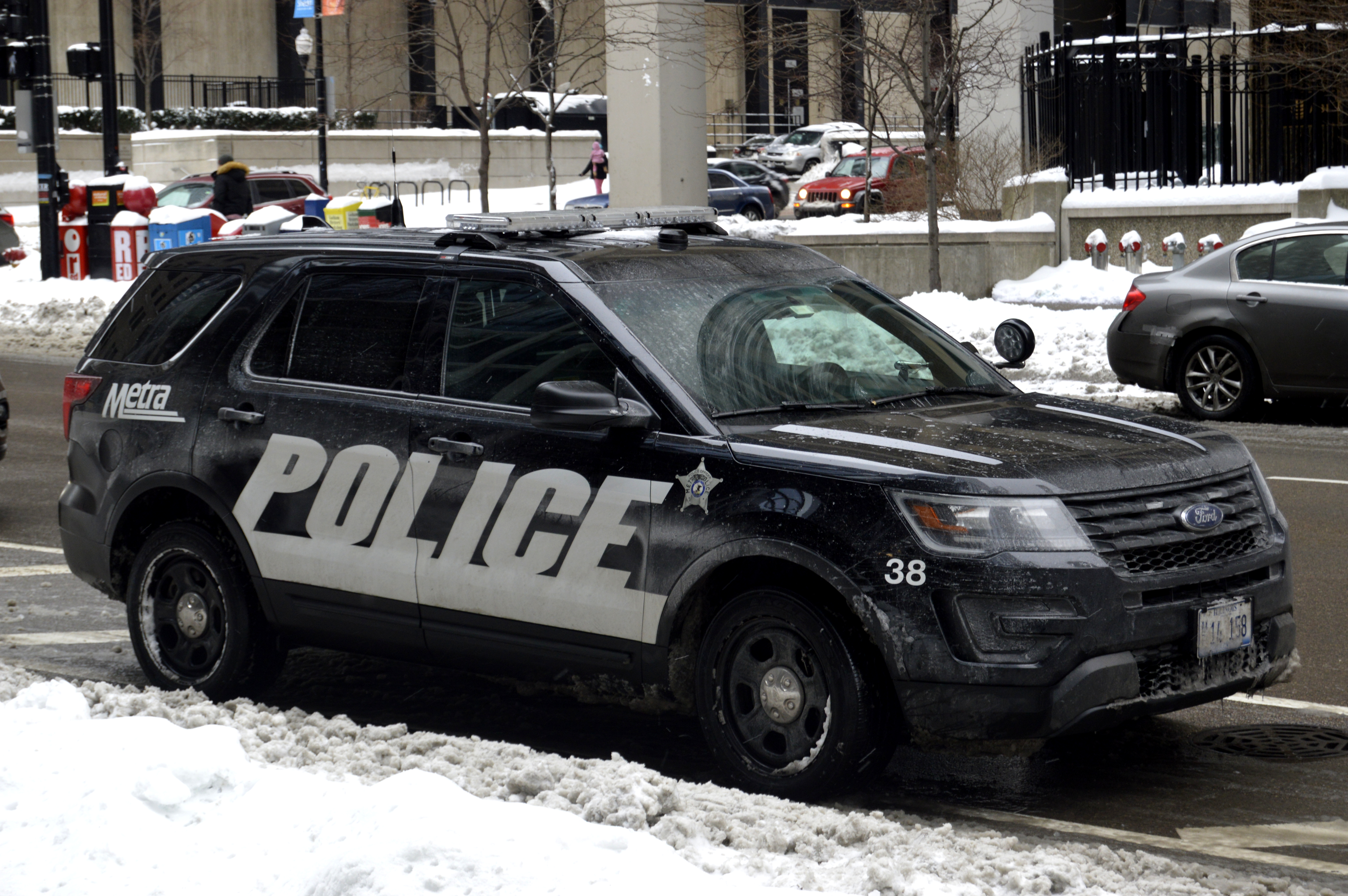
Metra police vehicle

The Metra Police Department is a special law enforcement agency charged with providing police services to passengers, employees, equipment and property. The department has more than 100 police officers and is responsible for the safety of all routes and stations. In an effort to help coordinate emergency preparedness and incident management, all Metra police officers are certified in the National Incident Management System. In addition, Metra police works with the Chicago Police Department as a member of the Chicago Alternative Policing Strategy. Thomas A. Cook was the only Metra police officer that has been killed in the line of duty thus far.

=== Rail safety ===
The focus on rail safety by Metra comes from many fronts beyond operations including emergency preparedness and public awareness. The setup of railway platforms, use of grade crossing signals and horn blasts make up a critical system used to communicate movements of commuter trains to pedestrians and vehicles. Outside of these operational components, Metra aggressively pursues safety through public awareness. Metra utilizes its own Operation Lifesaver program and uses it to help spread safety messages. Metra also holds events promoting rail safety at schools and organizes a safety poster contest awarding winners with prizes and features their posters on monthly passes and at stations.

Metra has been honored with several E. H. Harriman Awards for employee safety, most recently with a Bronze award in class B (line-haul railroads with between 4 and 15 million employee hours per year) for 2005. Previous Harriman Awards conferred to Metra include Gold awards for 2003 and 2004 and a Silver award for 2002.

Metra expects to implement positive train control on its entire system in 2019, four years after the federally mandated 2015 deadline.

=== Incidents ===
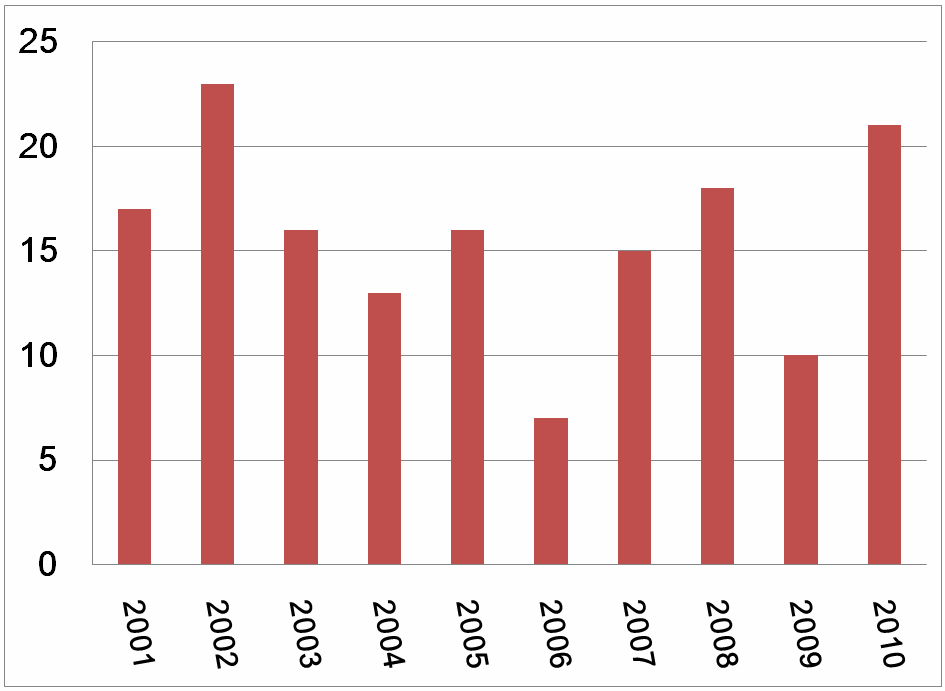
Metra related fatalities: The bar graph above shows the number of non-employee, Metra related deaths (listed vertically). This graph uses data from the previous decade and is organized by year (horizontally).

There were 156 non-employee fatalities involving Metra equipment and Metra owned track between 2001 and 2010. On average 15 people were killed annually based on data from that decade. The highest number of fatalities in a year throughout that time occurred in 2002, with 23 deaths and in 2010, with 21 deaths. The majority of these fatalities occurred at grade crossings and on railway involving an impact with a train; only four deaths involved passengers aboard the train.

The worst commuter rail disaster in Illinois occurred before the formation of Regional Transportation Authority. The 1972 Chicago commuter rail crash consisted of a two-train collision at 27th Street station on what is now the Metra Electric, then under the control of the Illinois Central. The collision resulted in 45 deaths and 332 injuries. Two decades later, Metra experienced its first rail disaster, the 1995 Fox River Grove bus–train collision. This accident involved a collision of a Union Pacific Northwest Line train and a school bus at a grade crossing resulting in 21 injuries and the deaths of seven high school students. In 2003, another incident involved a Rock Island District train derailing while switching from one track to another, injuring 45 passengers. In 2005, a train carrying 200 passengers along the same stretch of track derailed and then collided with a steel bridge resulting in two deaths and 117 injured. The cause of both accidents was ruled to be human error; the trains were going at speeds in excess of 68 miles per hour (109 km/h) when they should have been going 10 miles per hour (16 km/h).

On May 11, 2022, a Metra train collided with a box truck at Clarendon Hills station on the BNSF Line, resulting in four injuries, and one death. The passenger who was killed, a 72-year-old woman from Downers Grove, was ejected from a window of the train during the collision. This incident, as of May 2022, is the second incident in Metra's history that resulted in a passenger fatality.

In addition to the loss of life, injuries, damage and service disruptions caused by accidents, Metra and other transportation agencies have been involved in multimillion-dollar lawsuits and settlements stemming from safety failures. These failures have also resulted in updated safety policies and adjustments of equipment and warning devices.

== Rolling stock ==
=== Current locomotives ===
All of Metra's locomotives are diesel-electric locomotives. The bulk of its locomotive fleet consists of F40PH locomotives. The Electric District uses electric multiple units.

Builder	Model	Road Numbers	Year built	Notes	Image
EMD	SW1	2	1946	Originally owned by the Illinois Central Railroad, later sold to the Rock Island Railroad.	
EMD	SW1200	3	1954	Originally Milwaukee Road	
EMD	SW1500	4–6, 8–9	1967–68, 1971–72	Originally Southern Pacific	
EMD	GP23ECO	10–11	1969, 1966	Two GP23ECOs from Progress Rail. Both built as GP40s.	
EMD	GP15-1/GP15N	12–15	1982	Three GP15-1s and one GP15N from Union Pacific as part of the transfer of commuter operations to Metra. Former GP15-1s were UPY 723, 728, and 729, and the GP15N was UPY 711.	
EMD	F59PHI	73–93	1998	Nos. 73–87 ex-Pacific Surfliner; Nos. 88–93 ex-Amtrak Cascades; Entered service in October 2018.; No. 79 painted in lightning bolt livery; No. 90 in Chicago and North Western Railway heritage livery; remainder in modified Surfliner livery.; Mostly stored at various locations.	
EMD	F59PH	94–99	1988	Nos. 97–99 ex-AMT; Entered service in 2015.; Nos. 94–96 stored at Antioch.	
EMD	F40PH-3	100–149, 173–184, 216, 217	1977, 1979–81, 1983, 1988–89	Nos. 100–149 rebuilt to –3 specifications between 2008 and 2012; undergoing a second rebuild starting in 2022.; No. 104 carries a City of Chicago commemorative livery.; No. 120 carries a veterans commemorative livery.; Nos. 174–184 rebuilt between 2016 and 2017.; No. 173 rebuilt in 2018 to replace wrecked F40PHM-2 No. 205.; No. 216 ex-TCRX, née-Amtrak 375; it entered Metra service in 2010.; No. 217 ex-VRE V32, née-Amtrak 364. It entered Metra service in 2017.	
EMD	F40PH	150–153, 155–157, 160, 162–172	1983	Retirement in progress, being replaced by SD70MACHs.	
EMD	F40PHM-3	185–204, 206–214	1991–1992	Last F40PH series locomotives built by EMD.; Rebuilt to –3 specifications from F40PHM-2 between 2016 and 2020.; No. 211 painted in Chicago, Burlington & Quincy heritage livery.	
MPI	MP36PH-3C	401–427	2003–2004	Converted from MP36PH-3S.; No. 402 painted in Illinois bicentennial livery.; No. 405 painted in Milwaukee Road heritage livery, named for Richard P. Oppenheim.; No. 425 painted in Rock Island heritage livery, named for Don Orseno.	
EMD	SD70MACH	500–541	1999–2000	Rebuilt from SD70MAC locomotives built between 1992 and 2004.; As of March 25, 2024, 24 units had been rebuilt, of 42 total, replacing F40PH-2 units (150–172) and some F40PH-3 units (100–149 and 215–216, except No. 104).; The first unit was delivered in October 2022.; Deliveries occurred at a rate of about one per month through 2022 and 2023. The first units entered revenue service in late 2023.; No. 500 painted in RTA heritage livery.; No. 525 painted in America 250th Anniversary livery.	

==== Retired locomotives ====
Builder	Model	Road Numbers	Year Built	Notes	Image
EMD	F7	305, 308	1949	Donated to the Illinois Railway Museum. 305 has been restored as Chicago and North Western 411, while 308 is still painted in Metra colors.	
EMD	E8	507–510, 512–522	1950–53	508, 516, and 518 sold to IPH. 515 is now owned by the Illinois Railway Museum as of December 2021. 522 is owned by LWV and was renumbered 101. 519 is privately owned, numbered MREX 97. Currently located at the Arizona Railway Museum in Chandler, Arizona. 513 is on display at The Historic Railpark and Train Museum in Bowling Green, Kentucky being displayed as Louisville and Nashville 796.	
EMD	E9	511	1955	Owned by UP and cosmetically restored to original number of UP 949.	
EMD	F40C	600–614	1974	Built as MILW 40-54. 611 (ex. MILW 51) was donated to the Railroading Heritage of Midwest America in March 2026. 614 (ex. MILW 54) was donated to the Illinois Railway Museum in February 2025. Remainder scrapped.	
EMD	SW1500	7	1968	Sold to NRE in Dixmoor, Illinois in 2015 due to an internal engine failure, and was scrapped due to site's closure in 2020.	
EMD	SW1	1	1938	Originally owned by the Illinois Central Railroad, later sold to the Rock Island Railroad. #1 was modified with MU Car couplers and was the oldest operating locomotive in the U.S. that is not preserved. It was used to transfer cars from Metra Electric at Blue Island to the Blue Island wheelhouse to maintain a proper wheel profile on Metra Electric MU cars. Retired & auctioned off in June 2021 due to an internal engine failure.	
EMD	F40PHM-2	205	1992	Number 205 was wrecked in a CSX Derailment on March 8, 2018, while en route for refurbishment. It was scrapped on site.	
EMD	F40PH-2	154, 158, 159, 161	1983	Sold to MxV Rail.	

=== Coaches ===
Numbers	Type	Heritage	Year built	Builder	Disposition
740–751, 753–780, 782–787	Coach	Burlington Route	1955–65	Budd	Rebuilt in 1973
796–815	Coach/Cab	Burlington Northern	1973	Budd	
816–820	Coach	Burlington Northern	1973	Budd	
7100–7121	Coach	Burlington Northern	1977–78	Budd	
6001–6194	Coach	Metra	2002–08	Nippon Sharyo	No. 6103 converted into a café car in 2025.
6201-6207	Coach	Metra	2020	Nippon Sharyo	Acquired in 2020 as part of a settlement deal with Nippon Sharyo.
7200–7283	Coach	Milwaukee Road, Rock Island	1961–74	Budd	7242-7256 Built for the Rock Island in 1965, rest built for the Milwaukee Road between 1961-74.
7284-7381	Coach	RTA	1978-80	Budd	
7400–7497	Coach	Metra	1996–98	Amerail	Rebuilt in 2012
TBD	Coach	Metra	2027-present	Alstom	On order. Alstom Coradia bilevel coaches. Initial order includes 200 cars, with an option for 300 more. First delivery expected in January 2027.
8200–8238	Coach/Cab	Milwaukee Road, Rock Island	1961–74	Budd	8220-8224 Built for the Rock Island in 1965, rest built for the Milwaukee Road between 1961-74. Some have been converted to coaches.
8239–8275	Coach/Cab	RTA	1978–80	Budd	Some have been converted to coaches.
8400–8478	Coach/Cab	Metra	1994–98	Morrison-Knudsen/Amerail	Mainly assigned to the UP lines. 8400-8413 Built by M-K, 8414-8478 Built by Amerail
8501–8608	Coach/Cab	Metra	2002–08	Nippon Sharyo	
TBD	Coach/Cab	Metra	2027-present	Alstom	On order. Alstom Coradia bilevel coaches. Initial order includes 200 cars, with an option for 300 more. First delivery expected in January 2027.
7700–7866	Coach	Chicago and North Western	1960–70	Pullman-Standard	12 coaches sold to MARC and later reacquired by 2015. Some bike cars.
7868	Coach/bike car	Rock Island	1970	Pullman-Standard	
8743, 8749	Coach/bike car	Chicago and North Western	1960–68	Pullman-Standard	

==== Former coaches ====
Numbers	Type	Heritage	Year built	Builder	Disposition
700-739	Coach	Burlington Route	1950-1953	Budd	Sold to Federated Railways Leasing, planned to be used for MiTrain and WALLY Commuter services, plans never materialized. 6 units sold to WeGo Star. Two preserved at the Illinois Railway Museum.
790-795	Coach/Cab	Burlington Route	1965	Budd	Sold to Federated Railways Leasing, planned to be used for MiTrain and WALLY Commuter services, plans never materialized. 2 units sold to WeGo Star. One preserved at the Illinois Railway Museum.
7600–7613	Coach	Chicago and North Western	1955	St. Louis	Two preserved at the Illinois Railway Museum.
7650–7681	Coach	Chicago and North Western	1956	Pullman-Standard	One preserved at the Illinois Railway Museum.
7867, 7869–7871	Coach	Rock Island	1970	Pullman-Standard	
7880	Coach (former Parlor)	Chicago and North Western	1958	Pullman-Standard	Sitting Abandoned in Bensenville, IL as of November 2026.
7881–7885	Coach	Rock Island	1970	Pullman-Standard	
7900–7901	Club Car	Chicago and North Western	1955	St. Louis	
8700–8748	Coach/Cab	Chicago and North Western	1960–68	Pullman-Standard	One preserved at the Illinois Railway Museum.
8750–8763	Coach/Cab	Chicago and North Western	1960–68	Pullman-Standard	One preserved at the Illinois Railway Museum.

==== Private club coaches ====
Numbers	Type	Heritage	Year built	Builder	Disposition
553	Private railroad car	Chicago and North Western	1949	ACF	In storage
555	Private railroad car	Chicago and North Western	1949	ACF	Retired

=== Multiple units ===
Metra's electric units, except for the future battery electric multiple units, are also known as Highliners.

Numbers	Model	Type	Heritage	Year built	Builder	Status	Image
1227–1238	Highliner II	MU Coach	Metra	2012	Nippon Sharyo	Operating	
1239–1279	Highliner II	MU Coach	Metra	2013	Nippon Sharyo	Operating	
1280–1386	Highliner II	MU Coach	Metra	2014–2016	Nippon Sharyo	Operating	
TBD	FLIRT Akku	Battery electric multiple unit	Metra	2024-present	Stadler	On order. 16 trainsets. Initial service entry scheduled for late 2027. To be used on the Rock Island Beverly Branch.	

==== Retired ====
Numbers	Model	Type	Heritage	Year built	Builder	Status
1201–1226	Highliner	MU Coach	Metra	2005	Nippon Sharyo	Leased by NICTD in 2021 on a 15 year lease.
1501–1630	Highliner	MU Coach	Illinois Central	1971–1972	St. Louis	Retired
1631–1666	Highliner	MU Coach	Illinois Central	1978–1979	Bombardier	Retired

== See also ==
- Transportation in Chicago
- Chicago "L"
- Chicago Transit Authority
- Pace Suburban Bus
- South Shore Line
