= Metra Police Department =

Transit police in metropolitan Chicago

- Patch of the Metra Police Department

Agency overview
- Formed: 1983

Jurisdictional structure
- Operations jurisdiction: United States

Operational structure
- Sworn members: 150+
- Agency executive: Daniel O'Shea

Website
- metra.com/metra-police

The Metra Police Department is the railroad police of Metra, the commuter rail system of the Chicago metropolitan area. Its primary function is to protect Metra passengers, employees, assets (trains and stations), enforce criminal laws, traffic laws, and ordinances that directly or indirectly relate to the Metra system. Metra police officers are fully sworn officers just like the officers of any municipal police department, responsible for the safety and security of the Metra system, which consists of 243 stations on 11 rail lines.

== History ==
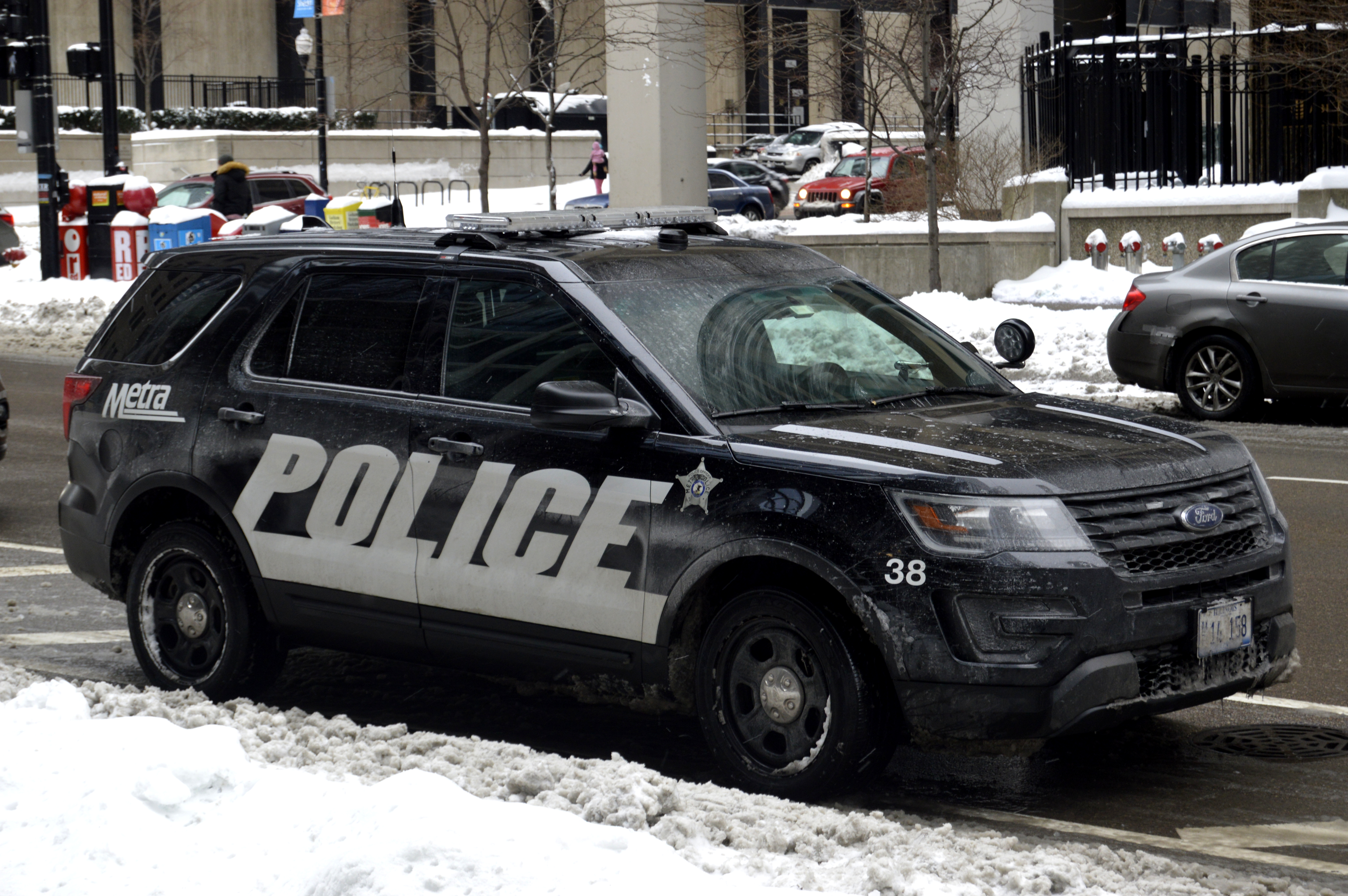
A Ford Police Interceptor Utility of Metra Police

In 1974, the Illinois State Legislature created the Regional Transportation Authority (RTA). When the RTA reorganized in 1983, Metra was created. This act empowers all the sub units of the RTA to establish and maintain police forces. The Metra Police Department was created at that time.

== Powers and authority ==
The RTA Act states that these police departments have the authority of municipal police officers. The main focus of department is the six-county transit operation, however due to the great distances between rail lines, off-property arrests occur on a regular basis.

All Metra police officers are fully certified police officers. Because of the six counties of police operation, tickets and criminal complaints are booked into many different courts. As a general rule, court cases are assigned in the nearest court, in the county of arrest.

== Safety ==
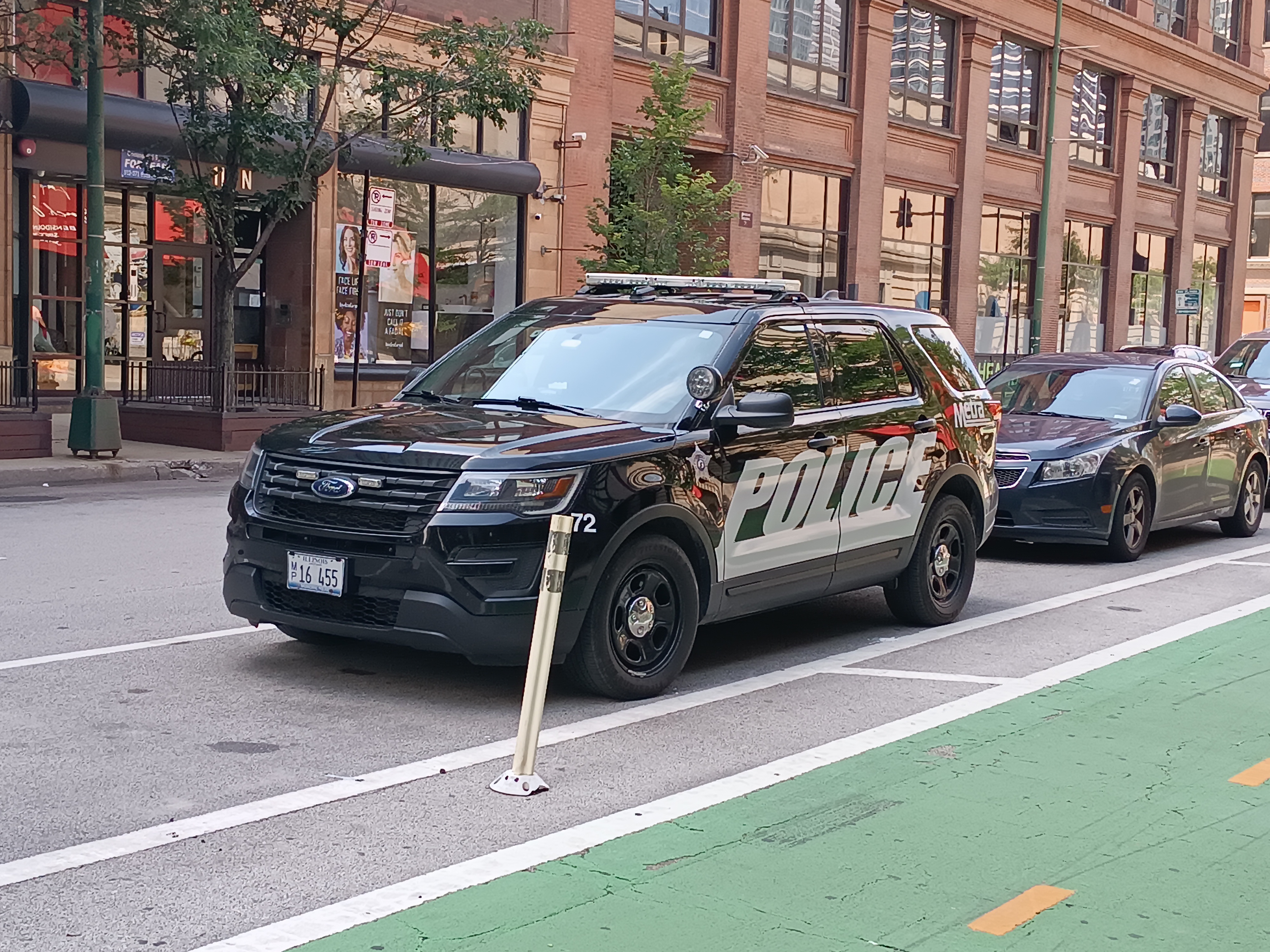
Metra police in Chicago, July 2024

Safety is an important part of this function, and preventing accidents and injuries are a focus of the department. Many times enforcing traffic laws around Metra stations and crossings is intended to increase awareness and citizen compliance.

Metra Police work in cooperation with local authorities to reduce or attempt to prevent hazardous conditions or blatant violations of the law which result in an unsafe condition. Metra Police routinely assist local, county and state agencies in non Metra related matters. The jurisdiction of the Metra Police extends well past the property owned or leased by Metra.

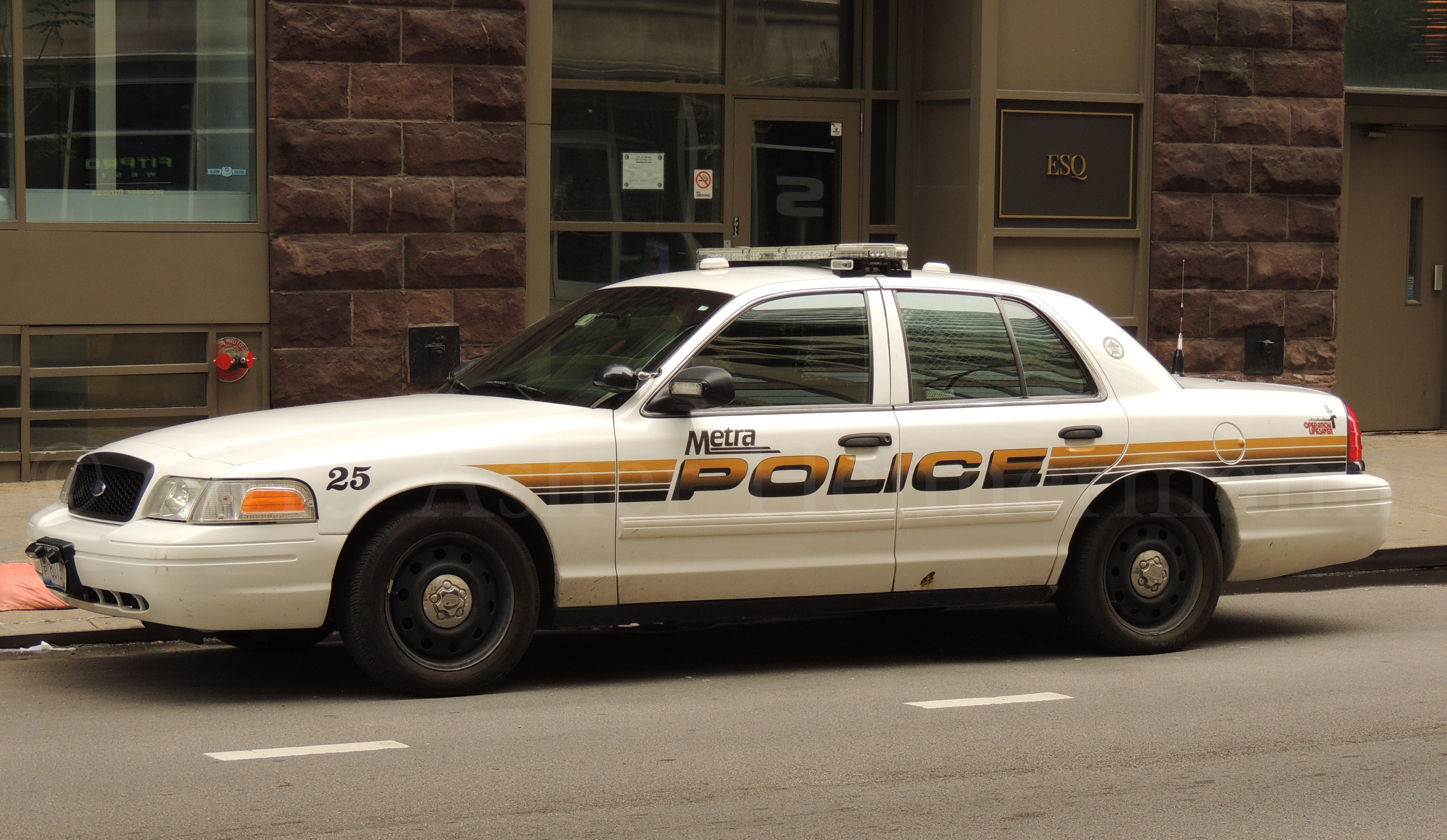
A Metra Police patrol car.

In 2008, the department began using a computer-aided dispatch system and new electronic report writing system.

== 2014 investigation report ==
In January 2014, an investigative report by the Chicago-based security consulting firm Hillard Heintze blasted the department as being "antiquated" and beset with excessive overtime and staffing problems. The 114-page report sketched an alarming portrait of law enforcement standards on the Metra system. It detailed myriad concerns about the agency's training, counter terrorism efforts and commitment to passenger safety. According to the report, the department averages less than one arrest per day.

=== New Chief ===
In May 2014, Joseph Perez was appointed Chief of the Metra Police Department. Perez was selected from a field of 12 candidates after 68 applied for the job.

== Homeland Security Unit ==
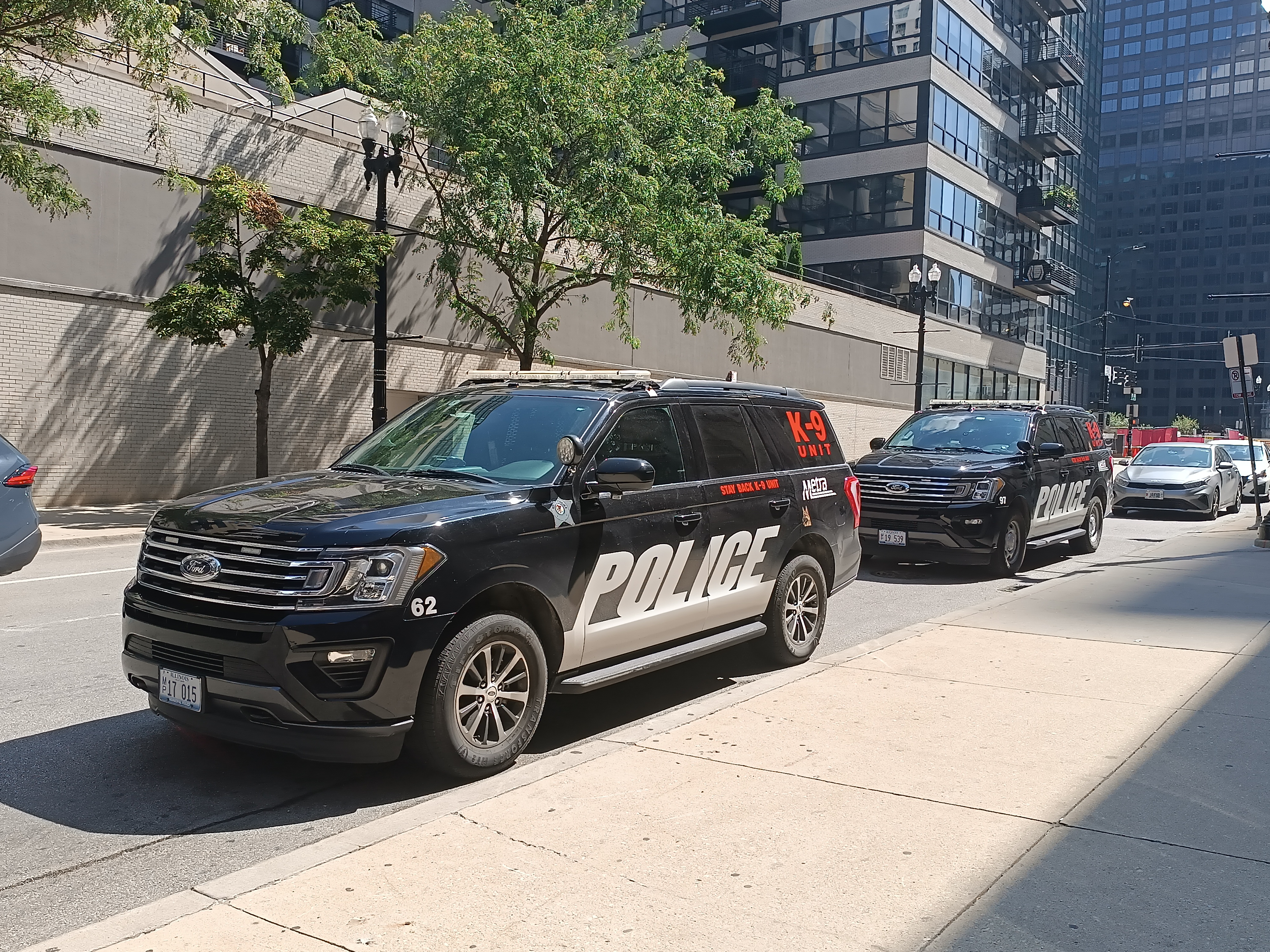
Two K-9 units of the Metra Police

After the September 11 attacks in 2001, the Metra Police Department increased its effort in anti-terrorism concerns. The Homeland Security Unit (formally Special Operations Unit) concentrates on protecting passengers and Metra terminals throughout the system. Officers have been assigned to the Chicago Police Fusion Center (CPIC), and the Illinois State Police Statewide Terrorism Information Center (STIC). Metra Police officers regularly participate in the Chicago Police CAPS program. Metra Police regularly participate in Chicago Office of Emergency Communications (OEMC) planning meetings for large events.

== Fatality ==
On September 27, 2006, 28-year-old Jemetric Nicholson fatally shot 43-year-old Officer Thomas A. Cook while he was working a robbery prevention detail near the 147th Street station in Harvey, Illinois. Nicholson shot Cook as he was seated in his patrol car. Nicholson was sentenced to life in prison on March 31, 2016, for Officer Cook's murder.

== See also ==
- Metra
- Regional Transportation Authority
- Railroad police
