= Highliner =

Class of American bi-level electric multiple units

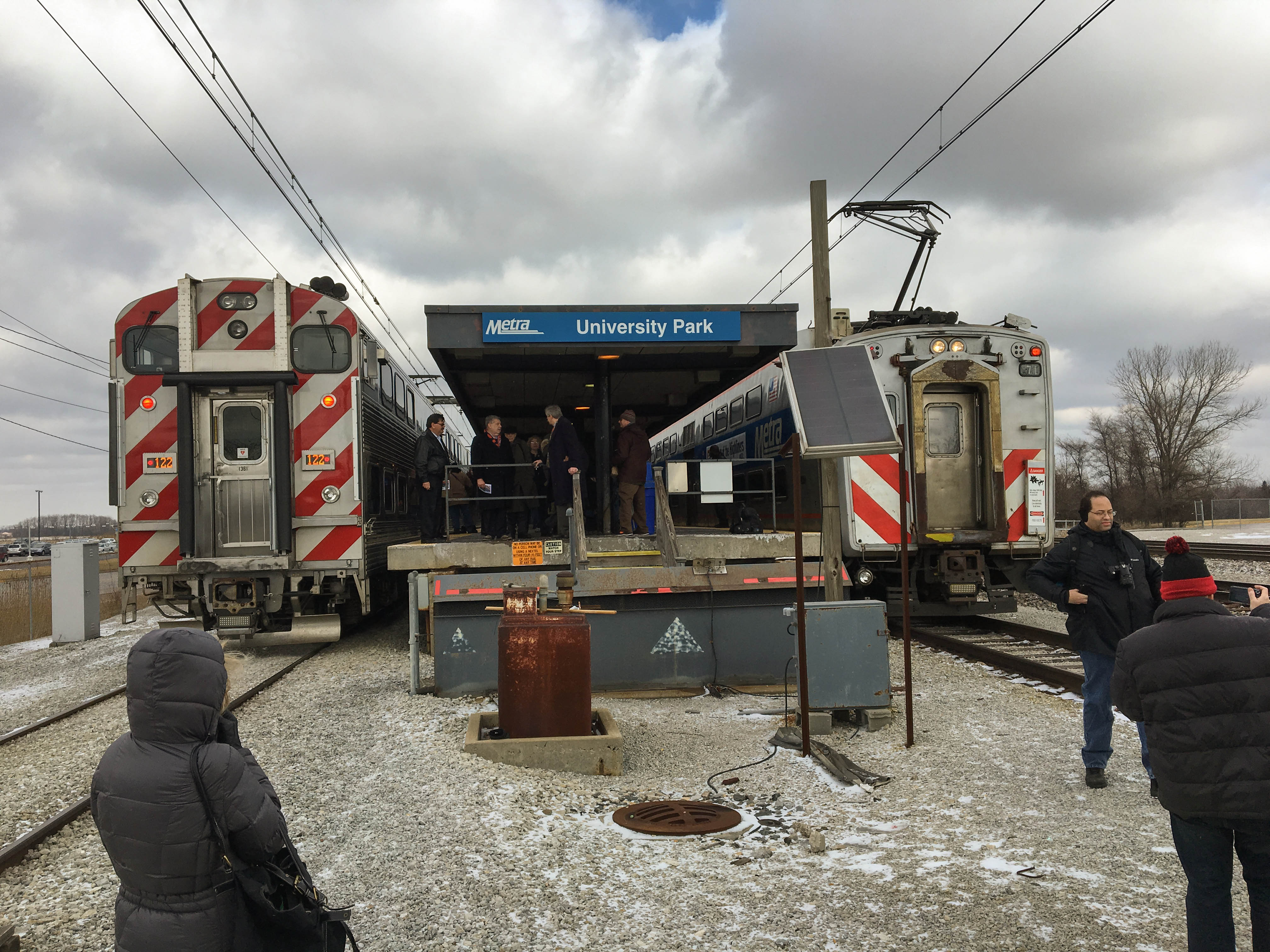
- A Highliner II on left and first-generation Highliner (now retired) on right at University Park.
- In service: Highliner: 1971–2016; Highliner II: 2005–present
- Manufacturers: Highliner: St. Louis Car Company, Bombardier; Highliner II: Nippon Sharyo
- Family name: Highliner; Highliner II: Budd Gallery car
- Constructed: Highliner: 1971, 1978–1979; Highliner II: 2005–2006, 2012–2016
- Number built: St Louis: 130; Bombardier: 36; Nippon: 201+
- Number preserved: Approx. 24
- Number scrapped: Most First Generation cars scrapped, second generation cars still in service
- Formation: Married pairs
- Fleet numbers: 1201–1226, 1501–1663 (Metra); 301–314 (NICTD)
- Operators: Illinois Central, Metra, NICTD
- Lines served: Metra Electric, South Shore Line

Specifications
- Car body construction: Highliner: carbon steel Highliner II : stainless steel
- Car length: Highliner: 85 feet (25.91 m); Highliner II: 85 feet (25.91 m)
- Width: Highliner: 10.5 feet (3.20 m); Highliner II: 9.82 feet (2.99 m)
- Height: Highliner: 15.83 feet (4.82 m) (to roof); Highliner II: 15.87 feet (4.84 m)
- Floor height: Highliner: 4.298 feet (1.31 m)
- Doors: Highliner: 1 end vestibule, 2 center Highliner II: 2 center
- Maximum speed: Highliner: 80 mph (130 km/h); Highliner II: 90 mph (140 km/h)
- Weight: Highliner: 140,000 lb (64,000 kg) (empty); Highliner II: 148,000 lb (67,000 kg) (empty)
- Traction system: Highliner II: IGBT-VVVF
- Traction motors: Highliner: 1258 DC motor (GE); Highliner II: 3-phase 4 pole AC induction motor
- Power output: Highliner: 150 hp (110 kW) continuous, 160 hp (120 kW) maximum 1-hr rating per motor (4 per car); Highliner II: 200 hp (150 kW) per motor (4 per car)
- Acceleration: Highliner: 1.36 mph/s (2.19 km/(h⋅s))
- Deceleration: Highliner: 1.5 mph/s (2.4 km/(h⋅s))
- HVAC: Electric heat, air conditioning
- Electric systems: 1,500 V DC overhead lines
- Current collection: Pantograph
- UIC classification: Bo’Bo’+Bo’Bo’
- AAR wheel arrangement: B-B+B-B
- Bogies: Highliner: Outboard Bearing GSI 70
- Braking systems: Pneumatic, dynamic
- Coupling system: Tomlinson
- Track gauge: 4 ft 8 1/2 in (1,435 mm) standard gauge

The Highliner is a bilevel electric multiple unit (EMU) railcar. The original series of railcars were built in 1971 by the St. Louis Car Company for commuter service on the Illinois Central Railroad, in south Chicago, Illinois, with an additional batch later produced by Bombardier. A second generation featuring a completely new design was produced by Nippon Sharyo beginning in 2005.

== History ==
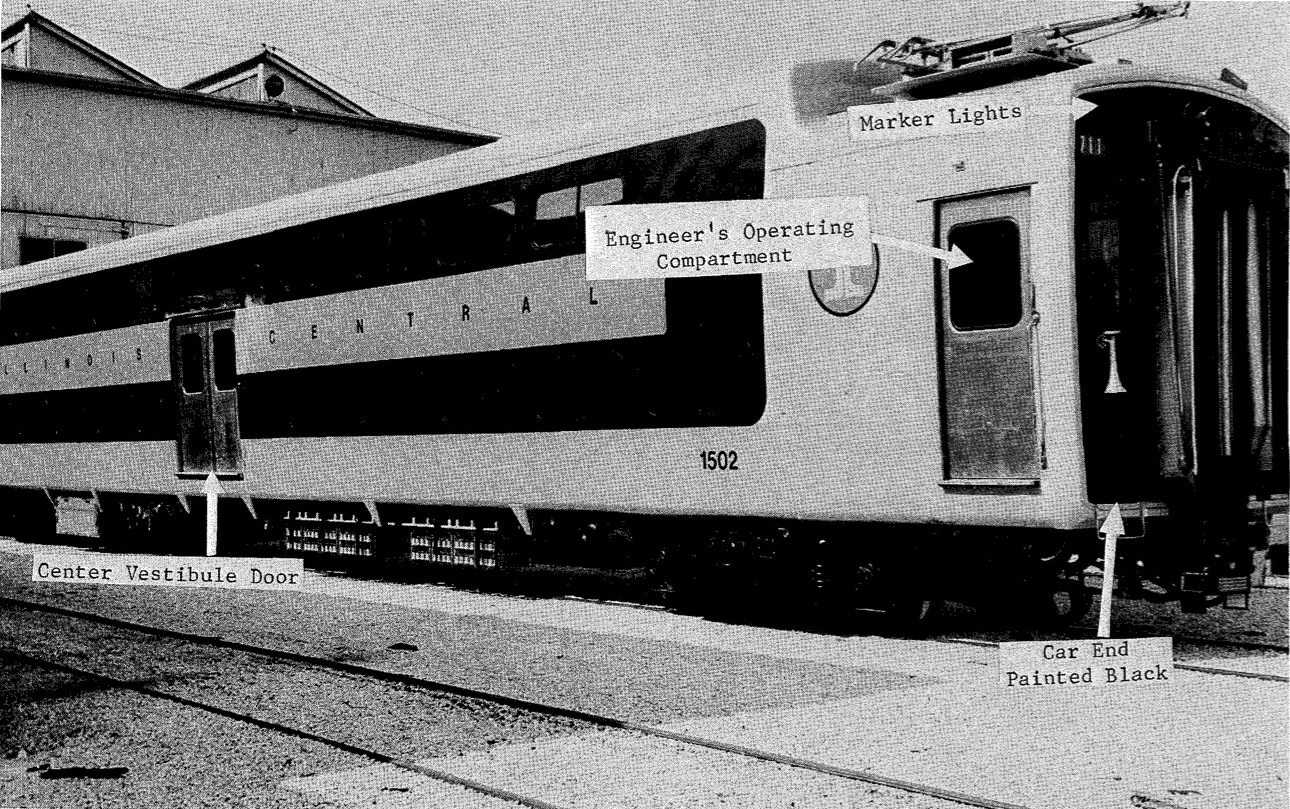
1972 rendering of the Highliner I cars

In 1926, the Illinois Central's commuter rail lines were electrified, and began operating as the "IC Electric". For almost 40 years, the IC Electric continued to operate the original fleet of heavyweight cars, until the railroad decided that a more modern railcar was needed to improve commuter operations. The Chicago South Suburban Mass Transit District was formed in 1967 in order to qualify for federal funding to purchase new equipment for the route. The original 130 car Highliner fleet had a cost of approximately $40 million; $26.6 million was funded by a federal grant, with the remainder coming from the Illinois Central. The railcars operated on electric catenary and were more efficient than their heavyweight predecessors. A typical Highliner was able to seat 156 passengers and run faster than the heavyweight fleet.

In 1976, the newly formed Regional Transportation Authority began to fund the IC Electric commuter service. In 1983, the RTA created Metra, Chicago's commuter rail service, and in 1987, Metra purchased the IC Electric line, forming the Metra Electric District.

An additional batch of 36 Highliners was built from 1978 to 1979 by the Bombardier company. Starting in 2005, the aged original fleet, which was increasingly prone to breakage and experiencing soaring maintenance costs, began to be phased out and replaced with the Highliner IIs. The last revenue run of the original Highliner cars was on February 12, 2016. Metra confirmed in a Facebook post that twenty-four cars are being sent to museums around the Midwestern United States, including the Illinois Railway Museum, while the other cars were sent to Mendota, Illinois to be scrapped.

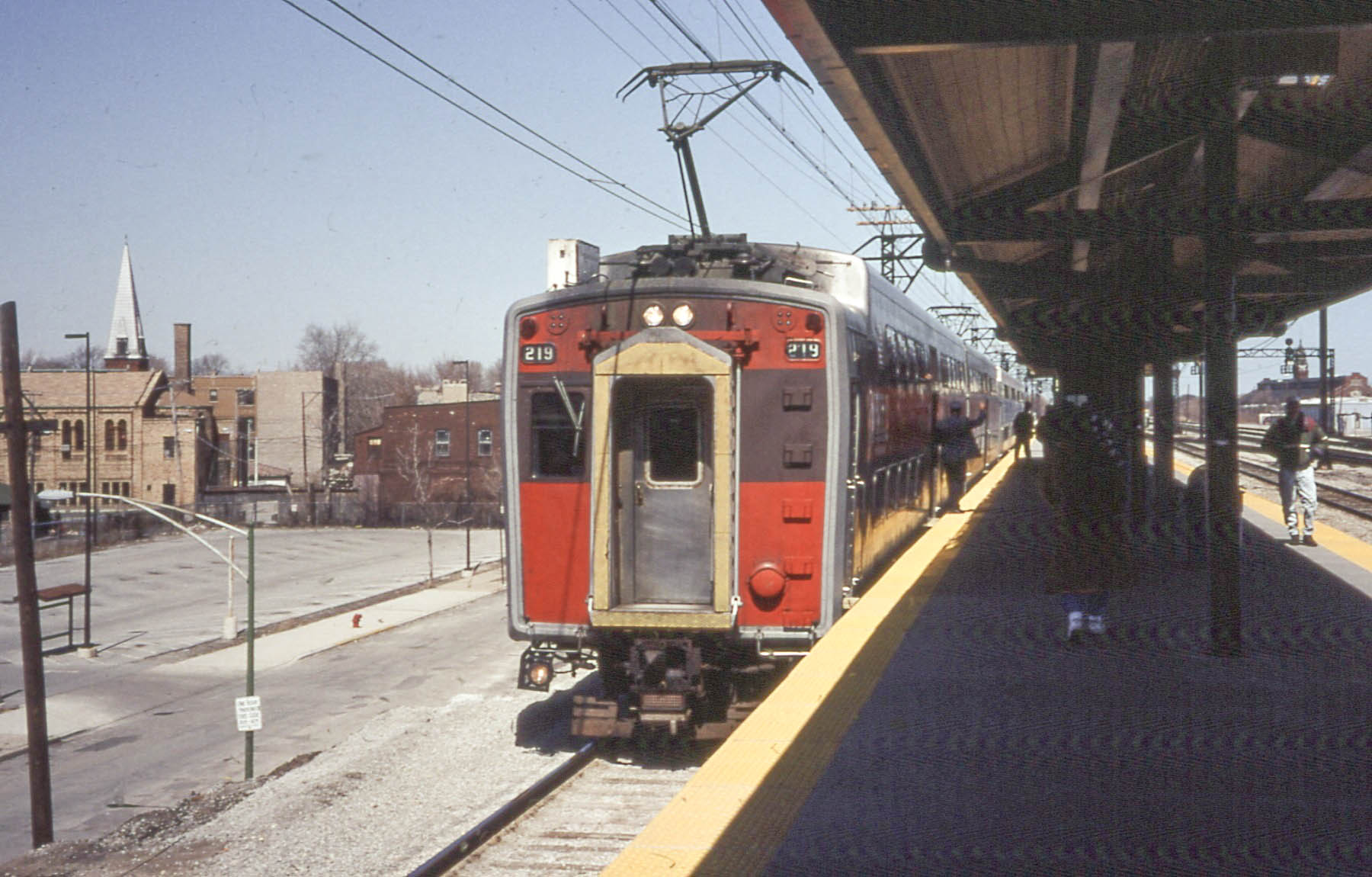
Metra Highliner I in the Illinois Central paint scheme at 115th Street in 1996

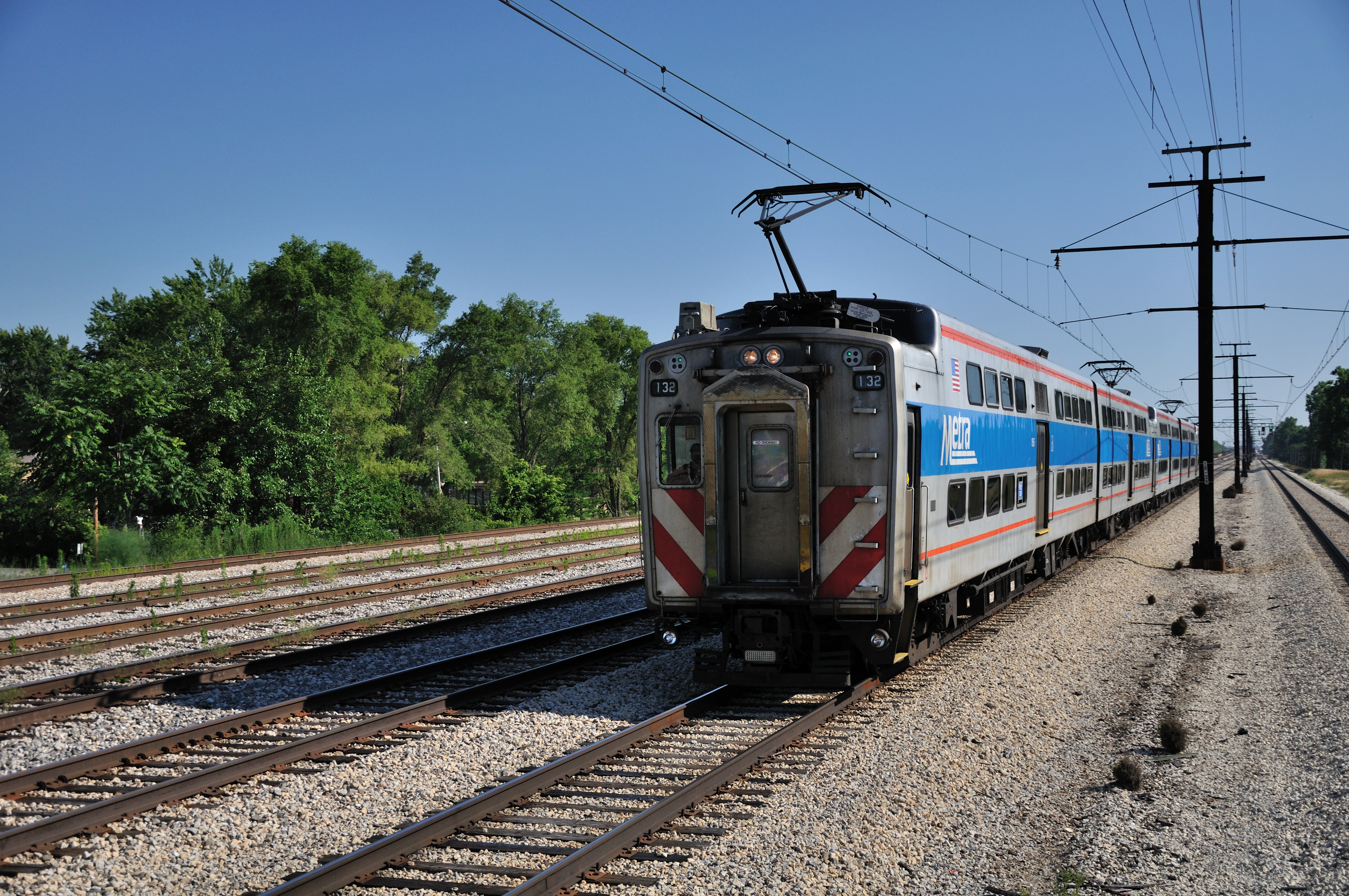
Metra Highliner I in the new livery at Ivanhoe, IL in 2010

=== Highliner II ===
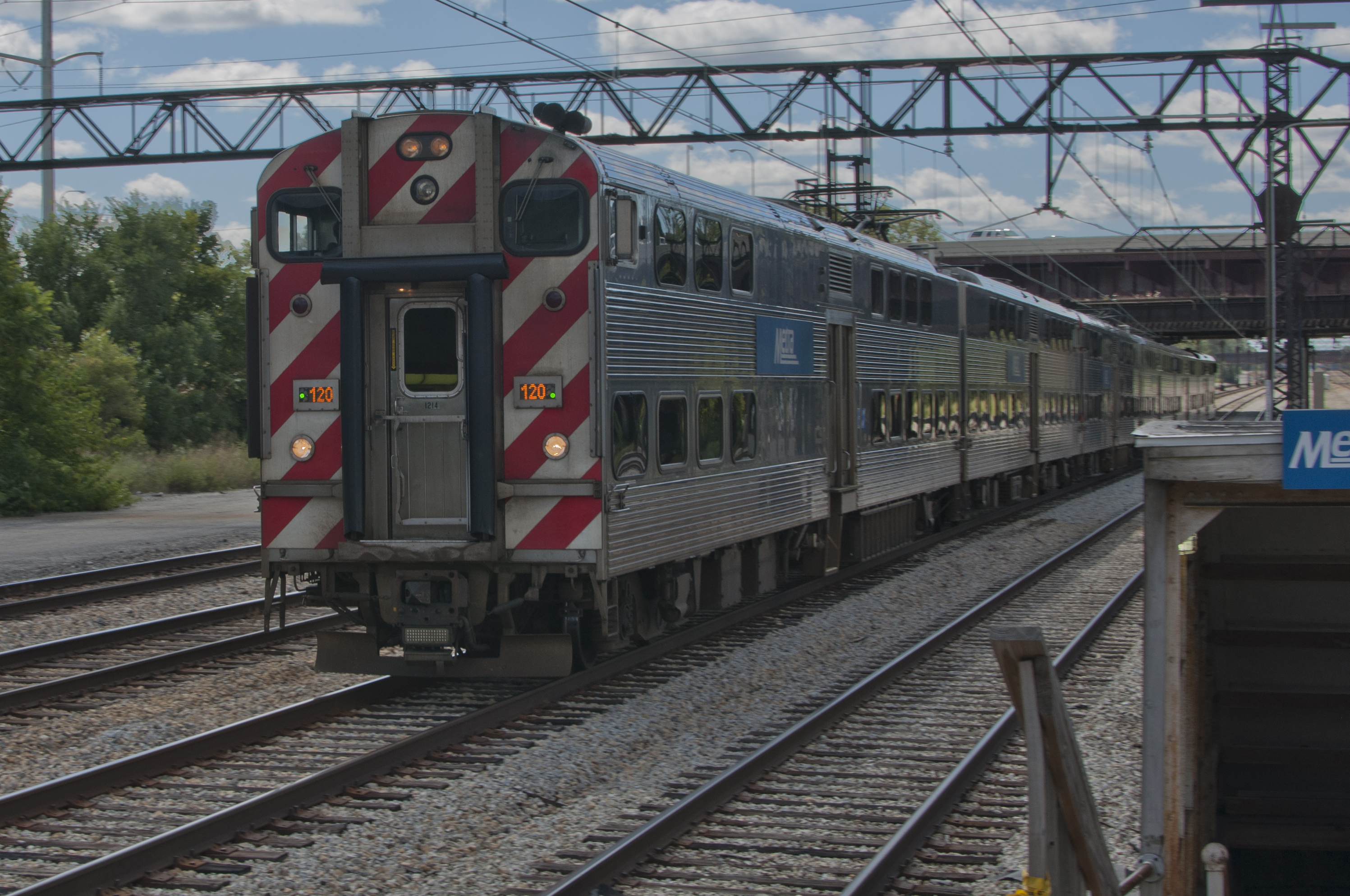
Metra Highliner II at Grand Crossing

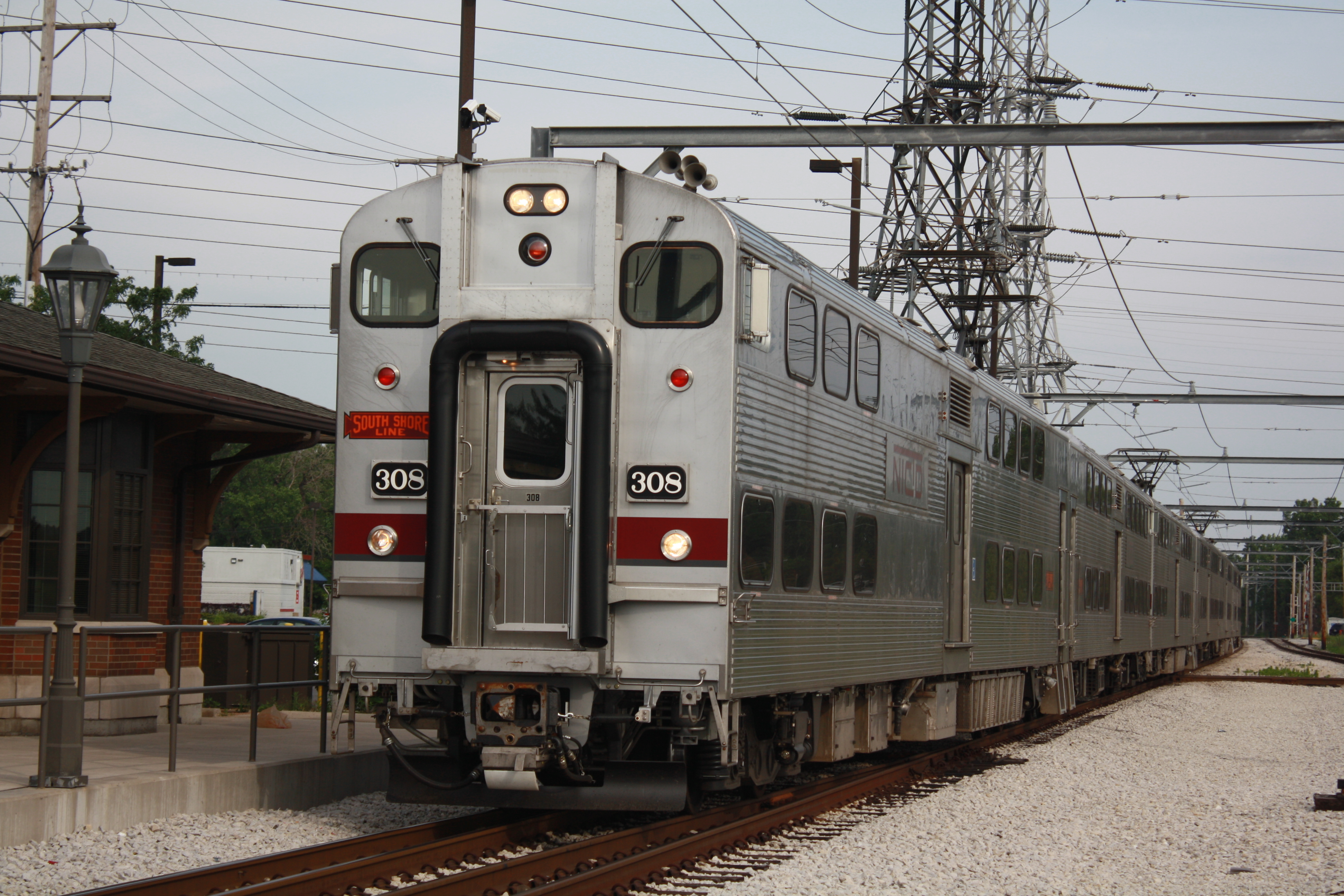
Highliner II cars operating for the South Shore Line

The Highliner II is a railcar built by Nippon Sharyo, a Japanese railcar manufacturer which was in charge of production of Metra's fleet of gallery cars, in collaboration with Sumitomo Corporation and Sumitomo Corporation of America.

The Highliner IIs are similar in appearance and internal layout to the gallery cars used on Metra's diesel lines. The South Shore Line, which operates on the Metra Electric from Millennium Station to Kensington/115th Street before diverging east to Indiana, also purchased and operates the Highliner II to supplement its fleet of EMUs.

Metra Highliner IIs have two center doors, where one of the center doors has a "trap" to allow for low level boarding by employees or for emergencies. However, the Highliner IIs originally designed for the South Shore Line (cars 1201-1226) have a separate single door at the end of the car instead with a trap for low level boarding, similar to the single-level South Shore Line EMUs.

In 2016, Nippon Sharyo closed its plant in Rochelle where it had manufactured the Highliner IIs, due to its failure to complete its contract to build bilevel railcars for Amtrak and other corporate financial issues.

In 2021, NICTD entered an agreement to lease 26 Highliner II cars from Metra under a 15-year lease to support increased service . These cars are from the original order delivered in 2005-2006 and are considered an "excess" fleet for Metra.

In 2024, Metra tested 79mph operations on part of the Metra Electric District and has committed to getting the entire network to 79mph. Signaling and catenary work has begun. The previous 65mph limit was a result of 1926 Pullman stock braking algorithms which were replaced by Highliner I and no longer relevant.

== Fleet ==
=== Highliner I ===
Owner	Numbers	Type	Heritage	Year built	Builder	Status	Notes
Metra	1501–1630	MU Coach	Illinois Central	1971–1972	St. Louis	Retired	Car #1509 destroyed in 1972 Chicago train collision
Metra	1631–1666	MU Coach	RTA	1978–1979	Bombardier	Retired	

=== Highliner II ===
Operator	Numbers	Type	Heritage	Year built	Builder	Status
South Shore Line	1201–1226	MU Coach	Metra	2005	Nippon Sharyo	Operating, on long term lease from Metra
Metra	1227–1238	MU Coach	Metra	2012	Nippon Sharyo	Operating
Metra	1239–1279	MU Coach	Metra	2013	Nippon Sharyo	Operating
Metra	1280–1386	MU Coach	Metra	2014–2016	Nippon Sharyo	Operating
South Shore Line	301–314	MU Coach	South Shore Line	2009	Nippon Sharyo	Operating
