= Bicycle rack =

The ambiguous term bicycle rack or bike rack may refer to:

- Bicycle carrier, a device attached to a vehicle (e.g., to a car or bus) to which bicycles can be mounted for transport
- Bicycle parking rack, a stationary fixture to which a bicycle can be securely attached (typically using a bicycle lock) to prevent theft
- Luggage carrier, a device attached to a bicycle to facilitate carrying loads

== See also ==
- Bicycle stand, various devices to hold a bike still while working on it
