= Hammond =

Hammond may refer to:

== People ==
- Hammond Innes (1913–1998), English novelist
- Laurens Hammond (1895-1973), inventor of the Hammond organ
- Hammond (surname)
- Justice Hammond (disambiguation)

== Places ==
=== Antarctica ===
- Hammond Glacier, Antarctica

=== Australia ===
- Hammond, South Australia, a small settlement in South Australia
  - Electoral district of Hammond, a state electoral district in South Australia

=== Canada ===
- Hammond River, a small river in New Brunswick
- Hammond Parish, New Brunswick
- Hammond, Ontario, Canada, now Clarence-Rockland, Ontario
- Port Hammond, British Columbia, also known as Hammond or Hammond's Landing
- Upper Hammonds Plains, Nova Scotia

=== England ===
- Hammond Street, a settlement in Broxbourne borough, Hertfordshire
- Stoke Hammond, a village in north Buckinghamshire

=== United States ===
- Hammond, Fresno, California
- Hammond Castle, a castle located in Gloucester, Massachusetts
- Hammond, Georgia, now Sandy Springs, Georgia
- Hammond, Illinois
- Hammond, Indiana, the largest U.S. city named Hammond
  - Hammond Circus Train Wreck
- Hammond, Kansas
- Hammond, Louisiana
- Hammond, Maine
- Hammond, Minnesota
- Hammond Township, Minnesota
- Hammond, Montana
- Hammond (town), New York
  - Hammond (village), New York, in the town of Hammond
- Hammond, Oregon
- Hammond station (disambiguation), stations of the name
- Hammond, Texas, a community in Robertson County, Texas
- Hammond (town), Wisconsin
  - Hammond, Wisconsin, a village within the town of Hammond
- Hammond Township (disambiguation)
- Plant Hammond, a coal-fired power plant in Floyd County, Georgia

== Other uses ==
- Hammond (Overwatch), a fictional character in the 2016 video game Overwatch
- Hammond High School (disambiguation)
- Hammond Map or "Hammond World Atlas Corporation", a subsidiary of the Langenscheidt Publishing Group
- Hammond organ, a musical instrument
- Hammond's postulate, a scientific hypothesis useful for understanding the thermodynamics of reactions
- Hammond Pros (1920–1926), a National Football League team from Hammond, Indiana
- USS Hamond (PF-73), also spelled Hammond, the original name of HMS Antigua (K501)

== See also ==
- Hamand (disambiguation)
- Hamond (disambiguation)
- Hamming (disambiguation)
