= Hammond station =

Hammond station may refer to:

- Hammond station (Louisiana), an Amtrak station in Hammond, Louisiana
- Hammond Gateway station, a South Shore Line station in Hammond, Indiana
- Downtown Hammond station, a future South Shore Line station in Hammond, Indiana
- Hammond–Whiting station, an Amtrak station in Hammond, Indiana

== See also ==
- Hammond (disambiguation)
