= Munster Ridge station =

South Shore Line station in Indiana

Munster Ridge
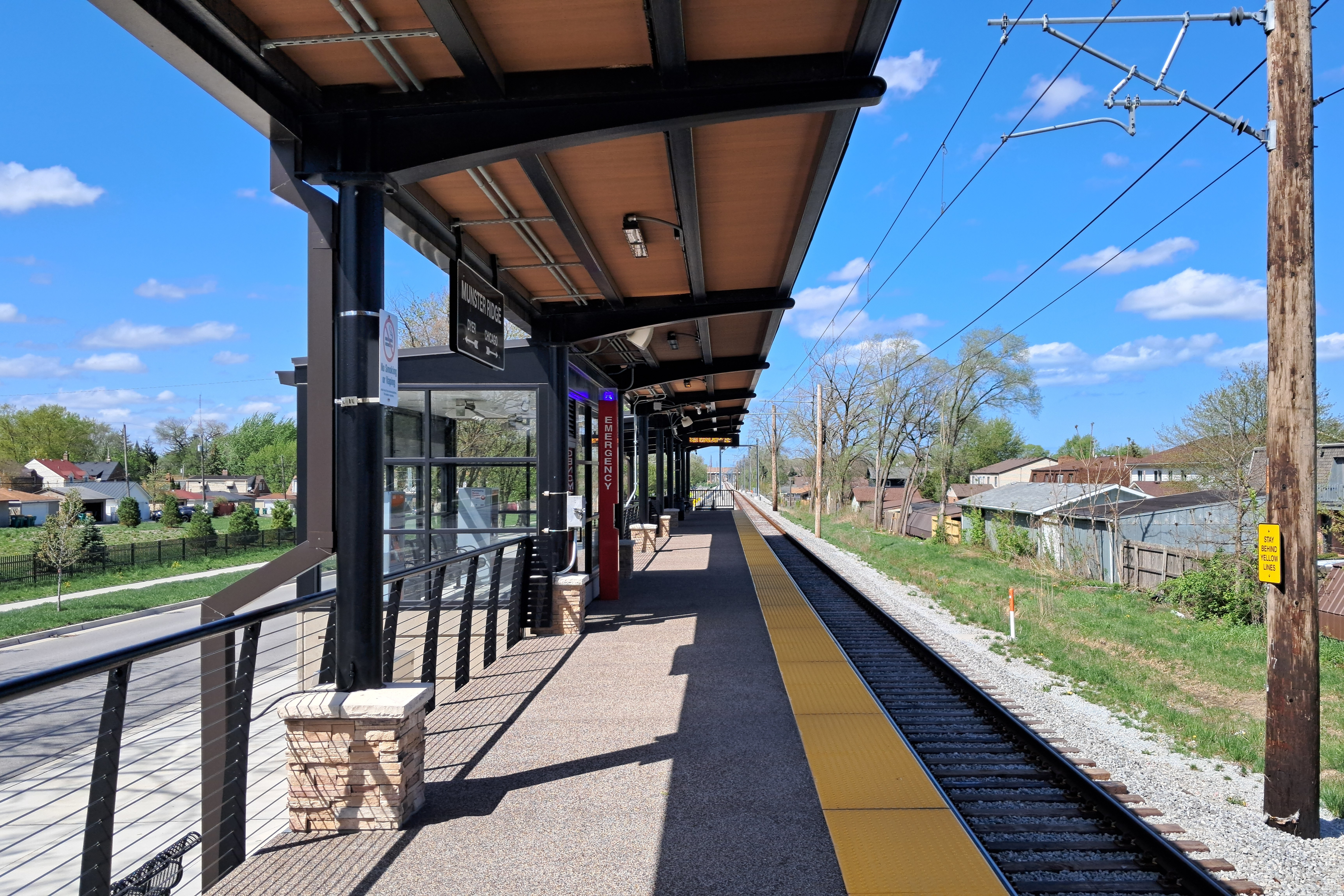
- Munster Ridge station platform, April 2026

General information
- Location: 8216 Manor Avenue; Munster, Indiana 46321
- Coordinates: 41.562683°N 87.518467°W
- Owner: NICTD
- Line: NICTD Monon Corridor
- Platforms: 1 side platform
- Tracks: 1

Construction
- Accessible: Yes

Other information
- Fare zone: 5

History
- Opened: March 31, 2026
- Electrified: Overhead line, 1,500 V DC

Services
Preceding station	NICTD	Following station
South Hammond toward Hammond Gateway or Millennium Station	Monon Corridor	Munster/Dyer Terminus
Location

Munster Ridge station is a South Shore Line rail station in Munster, Indiana. It opened to revenue service on March 31, 2026. The station is located at Ridge Road and Manor Avenue adjacent to the Monon Trail.
