= Haymond =

Haymond is a surname. Notable people with the surname include:

- Alvin Haymond (1942–2024), former American football defensive back
- Creed Haymond, American track and field athlete
- Thomas Haymond (1794–1869), nineteenth century congressman and lawyer from Virginia
- Major William Haymond (1740–1821), born in the colony of Maryland, son of John Haymond and Margaret Calder
- William S. Haymond (1823–1885), U.S. Representative from Indiana
- Peter Haymond, current United States Ambassador to Laos
- United States v. Haymond, a U.S. Supreme Court case

== See also ==
- Justice Haymond (disambiguation)
