= South Hammond station =

South Shore Line station in Indiana

South Hammond
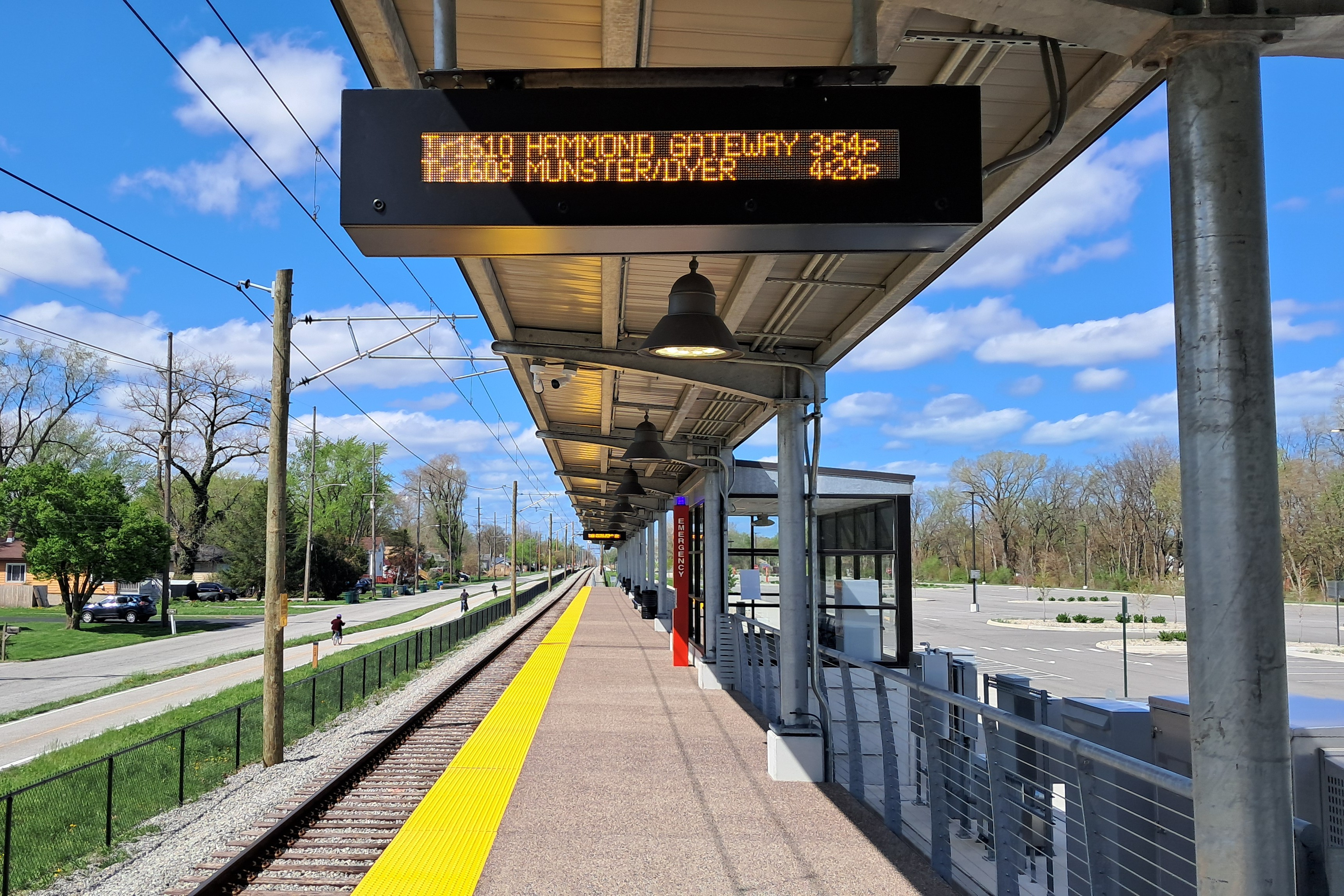
- South Hammond station platform, April 2026

General information
- Location: 401 173rd Street; Hammond, Indiana 46324
- Coordinates: 41.581272°N 87.518259°W
- Owner: NICTD
- Platforms: 1 side platform
- Tracks: 1

Construction
- Parking: Yes
- Accessible: Yes

Other information
- Fare zone: 4

History
- Opened: March 31, 2026
- Electrified: Overhead line, 1,500 V DC

Services
Preceding station	NICTD	Following station
Hammond Gateway Terminus	Monon Corridor	Munster Ridge toward Munster/Dyer
Hegewisch toward Millennium Station	Monon Corridor peak hours	Munster Ridge toward Munster/Dyer
Former services
Preceding station	Monon Railroad	Following station
Hammond toward Chicago	Main Line	Maynard toward Louisville
Future services
Preceding station	NICTD	Following station
Downtown Hammond toward Hammond Gateway or Millennium Station	Monon Corridor	Munster Ridge toward Munster/Dyer
Location

South Hammond station is a South Shore Line rail station in Hammond, Indiana. Constructed as part of the Monon Corridor project, it opened to revenue service on March 31, 2026. It features a 1,000-space park and ride lot and is adjacent to the Monon Trail.
