= Downtown Hammond station =

Future South Shore Line station in Indiana

Downtown Hammond
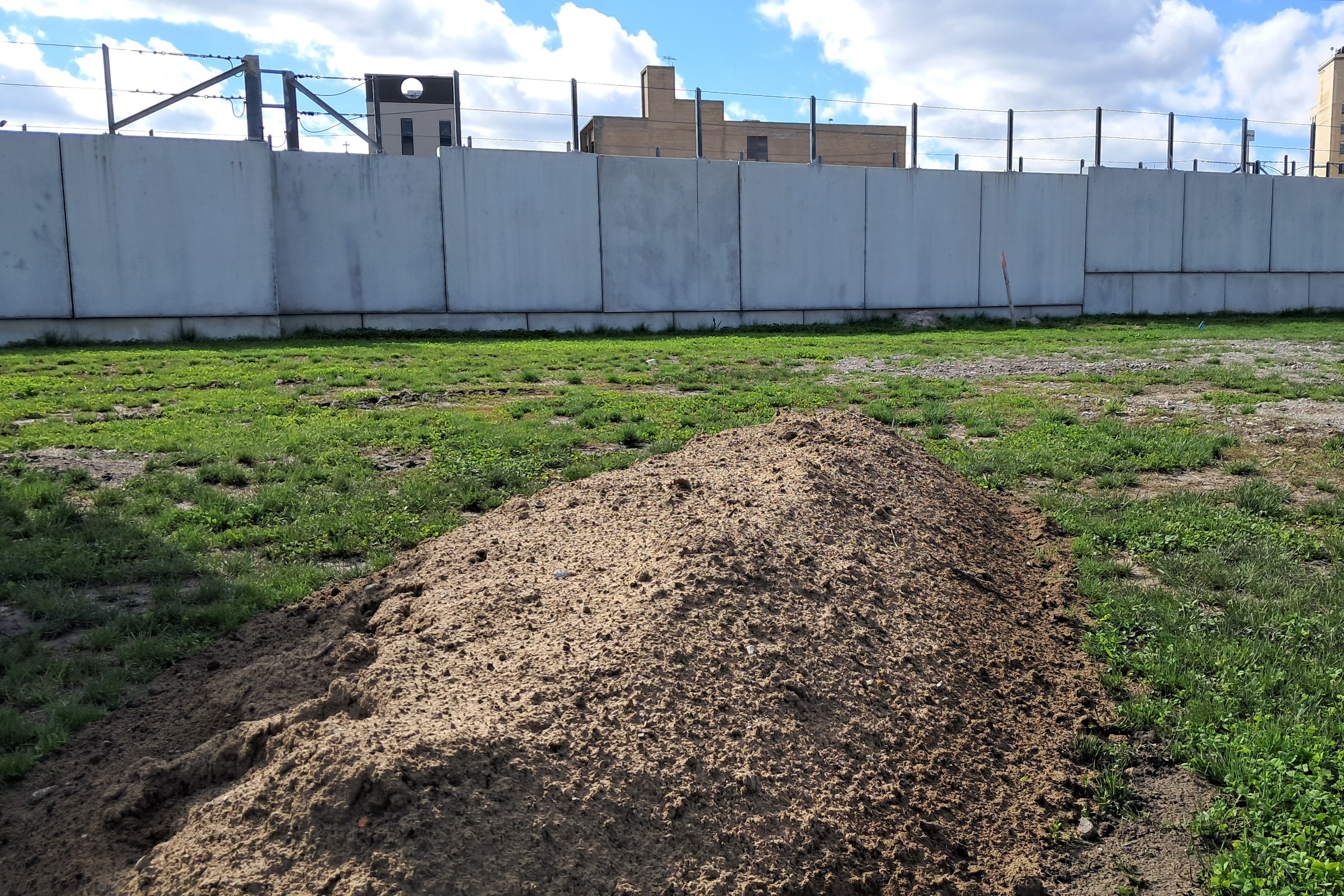
- Future site of station; photographed in April 2026, two days after a groundbreaking ceremony was held

General information
- Location: Russell Street at Lyman Avenue; Hammond, Indiana
- Coordinates: 41.6168°N 87.5195°W
- Owner: NICTD
- Line: South Shore Line Monon Corridor
- Tracks: 1

Construction
- Accessible: Yes

History
- Opening: 2027

Services
Preceding station	NICTD	Following station
Hammond Gateway Terminus	Monon Corridor	South Hammond toward Munster/Dyer
Hegewisch toward Millennium Station	Monon Corridor peak hours	South Hammond toward Munster/Dyer
Location

Downtown Hammond station is a future station along the South Shore Line's Monon Corridor to be located in Downtown Hammond, Indiana.

== History ==
NICTD did not construct a station serving Hammond's downtown area in the original construction of the Monon Corridor. However, as part of a plan to revitalize its downtown, the city of Hammond plans to construct a downtown station itself at Russell Street along a section of elevated track. This station was initially proposed to be located south of the federal courthouse, but the site was later moved two blocks north to facilitate better pedestrian access to the downtown core. Because the West Lake Corridor project had already received environmental approval prior to plans for this station, Downtown Hammond will be an infill station built after the initial opening of the line, though preparatory work (including provisions for a pedestrian access tunnel) was completed along with the rest of the initial West Lake Corridor project. In the summer of 2024, the City of Hammond selected an architect to design the downtown infill station. A groundbreaking ceremony was held on April 16, 2026. By the time the ceremony was held, the station was slated to cost $10 million and be completed in 2027.
