= Hamond =

Hamond may refer to:

== People ==
- Andrew Hamond (disambiguation), more than one person
- Anthony Hamond (died 1743) of South Wootton, near King's Lynn, Norfolk, husband of the sister of Sir Robert Walpole, KG
- Graham Hamond (disambiguation), more than one person
- Philip Hamond (1883–1953), British Army officer

== Ships ==
- USS Hamond (PF-73), a United States Navy patrol frigate transferred to the United Kingdom and in commission in the Royal Navy as HMS Antigua (K501) from 1943 to 1945

== See also ==
- Hamand (disambiguation)
- Hammond (disambiguation)
