= Monon Corridor =

Commuter rail line in Indiana, US

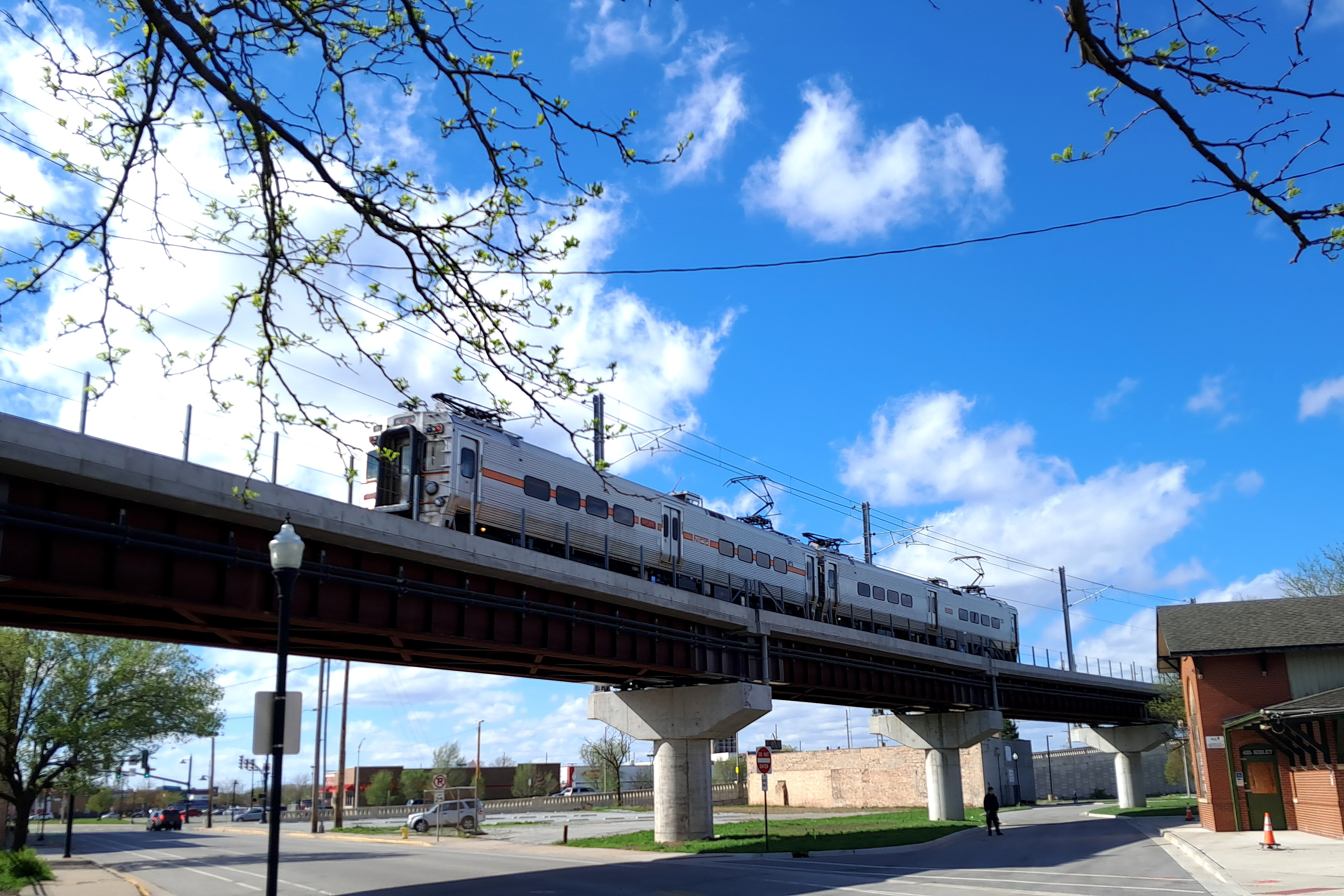
- Monon Corridor crossing above Sibley Street, April 2026

Overview
- Locale: Lake County, Indiana, United States
- Termini: Hammond Gateway; Munster/Dyer

Service
- Type: Commuter rail
- System: South Shore Line
- Operator: NICTD
- Rolling stock: Nippon Sharyo NICTD EMUs

History
- Opened: March 31, 2026; 7 months ago

Technical
- Line length: 9 mi (14 km)
- Num of tracks: 1 + passing sidings
- Track gauge: 4 ft 8 1/2 in (1,435 mm)
- Electrification: Overhead line, 1,500 V DC
Route map
Key

The Monon Corridor, also called the West Lake Corridor during project planning and construction, is a commuter rail line in Lake County, Indiana, that is part of the South Shore Line system. The line, which branches south from the main line at Hammond Gateway station along a single-track line, serves the municipalities of Hammond, Munster and Dyer. Trains run directly to Chicago during peak hours, while shuttle trains run between Hammond and Dyer during off-peak hours.

The Northern Indiana Commuter Transportation District (NICTD) began planning an extension of the South Shore Line to Valparaiso in 2006 due to population growth in Northwest Indiana. Plans were canceled in 2008 due to lower-than-expected ridership projections. The Indiana General Assembly approved funding for the branch in 2015, and the Federal Transit Administration awarded a grant to the line in 2019. Work started in October 2020, and the branch opened on March 31, 2026.

== History ==
=== New Start Studies ===
In the mid-2000s, the population and commercial growth in Lake and Porter counties in Northwest Indiana was outstripping projections. The Northern Indiana Commuter Transportation District determined that if the growth continued, it would be necessary to add another branch to the South Shore Line commuter rail. In 2006, planning proceeded for an extension to Valparaiso, but the NICTD was unable to confidently attain trackage rights on the Canadian National Railway line to Valparaiso. By 2008 a new study indicated that the Valparaiso to Munster branch would not generate sufficient ridership and was dropped from the plan.

Logo for the "West Lake Corridor" construction project

The Indiana General Assembly approved funding in 2015 for the construction of a South Shore Line branch to Dyer. The Lake County government and 15 of the county's towns agreed to provide funding for the branch. In 2017, the NICTD began demolition of houses between Hanover and Brunswick streets to begin building the new Hammond Gateway station, where trains would interchange with the main line. The same year, the NICTD modified its plans for the West Lake Corridor, adding a maintenance barn to the proposed Hammond Gateway station and relocating the proposed Munster Ridge station.

=== Capital Investment Grant Program ===
In March 2019, the Federal Transit Administration (FTA) gave the project a favorable rating meaning the project could qualify for funding from the Capital Investment Grant Program. NICTD anticipated to be awarded funding the following spring with construction beginning later in the year. That October, the FTA approved the project moving it into its engineering phase. The project was to cost $945 million, including $335 million from local sources, $255 million in state funds, and $355 million in federal funds.

=== Construction ===
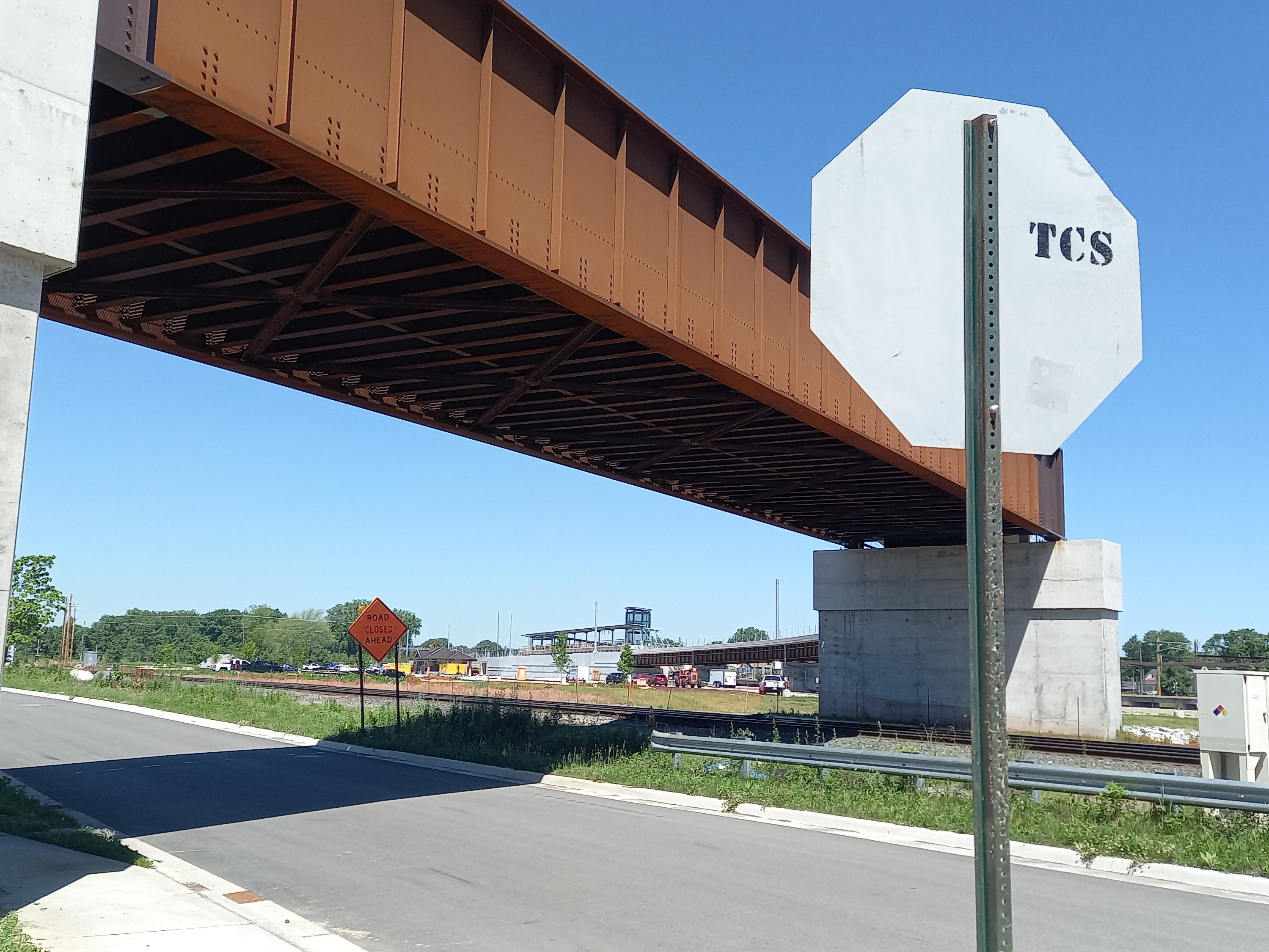
Monon Corridor south of Hammond Gateway station, 2024

A groundbreaking ceremony was held on October 28, 2020, which included the signing of a full funding grant between the FTA and NICTD. By July 2023, thirty-five percent of the project was finished; By November 2024, ninety percent of the work had been finished.

Although the project was called the West Lake Corridor, as far back as 2023, NICTD planned to adopt the Monon Corridor name to refer to the new branch.

In July 2023, NICTD's president Mike Noland said the West Lake Corridor could open as early as May 2025, as long as an underpass near the Dyer station was completed on schedule. The underpass's construction had been delayed due to the lack of approval from CSX Transportation, which owned the right-of-way of the rail line being crossed. Consequently, the underpass was not planned to be completed until September 2025. By June 2025, the line was expected to open before the end of the year. Later that September, transformers on the line were found to be damaged following a storm, although NICTD determined that the damages were not caused by the storm. As a result of the damages, the project was delayed to early 2026. Test trains were being operated by late 2025 and early 2026. On March 13, 2026, the branch's opening was set to March 31 in a farewell letter from the retiring NICTD's president Mike Noland. The line began operation on March 31, 2026, as scheduled.

== Alignment ==
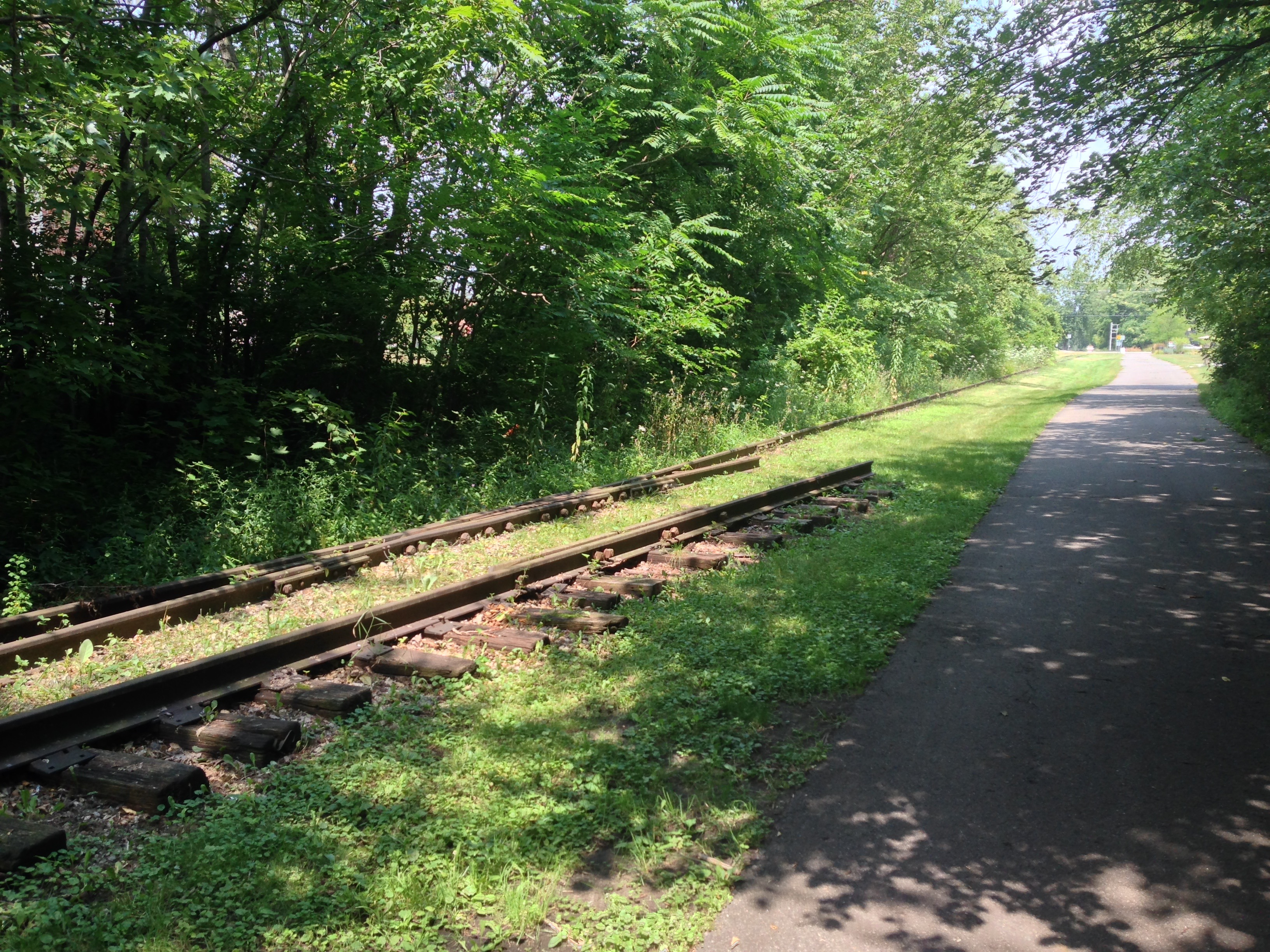
The Monon Trail and the then-abandoned Monon Railroad track prior to construction

Traveling southbound, the new branch leaves the existing main line immediately before Hammond Gateway station. From Hammond south, the line follows the route of Monon Trail until it reaches Maynard Junction. The Monon Trail was retained, but follows a new alignment. At Maynard Junction, the Corridor has a flyover over the EJ&E/CSX tracks, and then follows new tracks built immediately west of the CSX right-of-way. The Monon Corridor is single-tracked with a passing loop between Hammond and Munster.

The line, extending to the town of Dyer, runs for about 8 miles (13 km). Due to financial constraints, the initial segment did not extend to St. John or Lowell, but provisions have been made for future extension. NICTD has also proposed extending the line further south to serve Lowell, St. John, and Cedar Lake, but as of 2024 there are no specific plans to carry out this extension.

The line contains four stations in addition to a maintenance facility in Hammond. NICTD did not construct a station serving Hammond's downtown area. However, as part of a plan to revitalize its downtown, the city of Hammond plans to construct a downtown station itself at Russell Street along a section of elevated track. This station was initially proposed to be located south of the federal courthouse, but the site was later moved two blocks north to facilitate better pedestrian access to the downtown core. Because the West Lake Corridor project had already received environmental approval, Downtown Hammond will be an infill station built after the initial opening of the line, though preparatory work (including provisions for a pedestrian access tunnel) was completed along with the rest of the initial West Lake Corridor project. In the summer of 2024, the City of Hammond selected an architect to design the downtown infill station. A groundbreaking ceremony was held on April 16, 2026.

== Station listing ==
Fare zone	Location	Station	Mile (km)	Connections and notes
1	Chicago, IL	Millennium Station	0	Metra: Metra Electric; Chicago "L": Red (at Lake), Green Brown Orange Pink Purple (at Washington/Wabash); CTA buses: 4 X4 6 19 20 26 60 N66 124 143 147 148 151 157; Pace: 855; VALPOtransit: ChicaGo Dash
1	Chicago, IL	Van Buren Street	0.8 (1.3)	Metra: Metra Electric; CTA buses: 1 3 4 X4 6 7 J14 26 28 126 130 147 148 151
1	Chicago, IL	Museum Campus/11th Street	1.4 (2.3)	Metra: Metra Electric; CTA buses: 1 3 4 X4 12 130 146
2	Chicago, IL	57th Street	7.0 (11.3)	Metra: Metra Electric; CTA buses: 15 28 55 171
3	Chicago, IL	Hegewisch	19.0 (30.6)	CTA buses: 30; Pace: 358, 364
4	Hammond	Hammond Gateway	20.8 (33.5)	Shuttle service only; South Shore Line: Lakeshore Corridor; GPTC: R6
4	Hammond	Downtown Hammond	21.9 (35.2)	Future infill station
4	Hammond	South Hammond	24.1 (38.8)	
5	Munster	Munster Ridge	25.3 (40.7)	
5	Munster	Munster/Dyer	28.1 (45.2)	

== Service patterns ==
Most Monon Corridor trains operate as semi-hourly shuttle trains between the terminus at Munster/Dyer station and Hammond Gateway station, where passengers can transfer to Lakeshore Corridor trains with a wait of 10–15 minutes. During peak times, five trains run directly between Munster/Dyer and Millennium Station in downtown Chicago, in the direction of rush hour travel. Additionally, one reverse peak train runs during both the morning and evening rush hours. These through trains skip Hammond Gateway Station, but make all other regular South Shore Line stops between Millennium Station and Munster/Dyer Station.

== See also ==
- Monon Railroad
- Monon Trail
