= Hamming =

Hamming may refer to:

- Richard Hamming (1915–1998), American mathematician
- Hamming(7,4), in coding theory, a linear error-correcting code
- Overacting, or acting in an exaggerated way

== See also ==
- Hamming code, error correction in telecommunication
- Hamming distance, a way of defining how different two sequences are
- Hamming weight, the number of non-zero elements in a sequence
- Hamming window, a mathematical function used in signal processing
- Hammond (disambiguation)
- Ham (disambiguation)
