= Andrew Hammond =

Andrew Ham(m)ond may refer to:

- Andrew B. Hammond (1848–1934), American lumberman
- Andrew Hammond (ice hockey) (born 1988), professional ice hockey goaltender
- Sir Andrew Hamond, 1st Baronet (1738–1828), British naval officer
  - Sir Andrew Hammond (1800 ship)
  - Sir Andrew Snape Hammond (1802)
- Sir Andrew Snape Hamond-Graeme, 3rd Baronet (1811–1874) of the Hamond baronets

== See also ==
- Hammond (surname)
- Hamond (disambiguation)
