= Hammond Township =

Hammond Township may refer to the following townships in the United States:

- Hammond Township, Polk County, Minnesota
- Hammond Township, Spencer County, Indiana
