= Hegewisch station =

South Shore Line station in Chicago, Illinois

Hegewisch

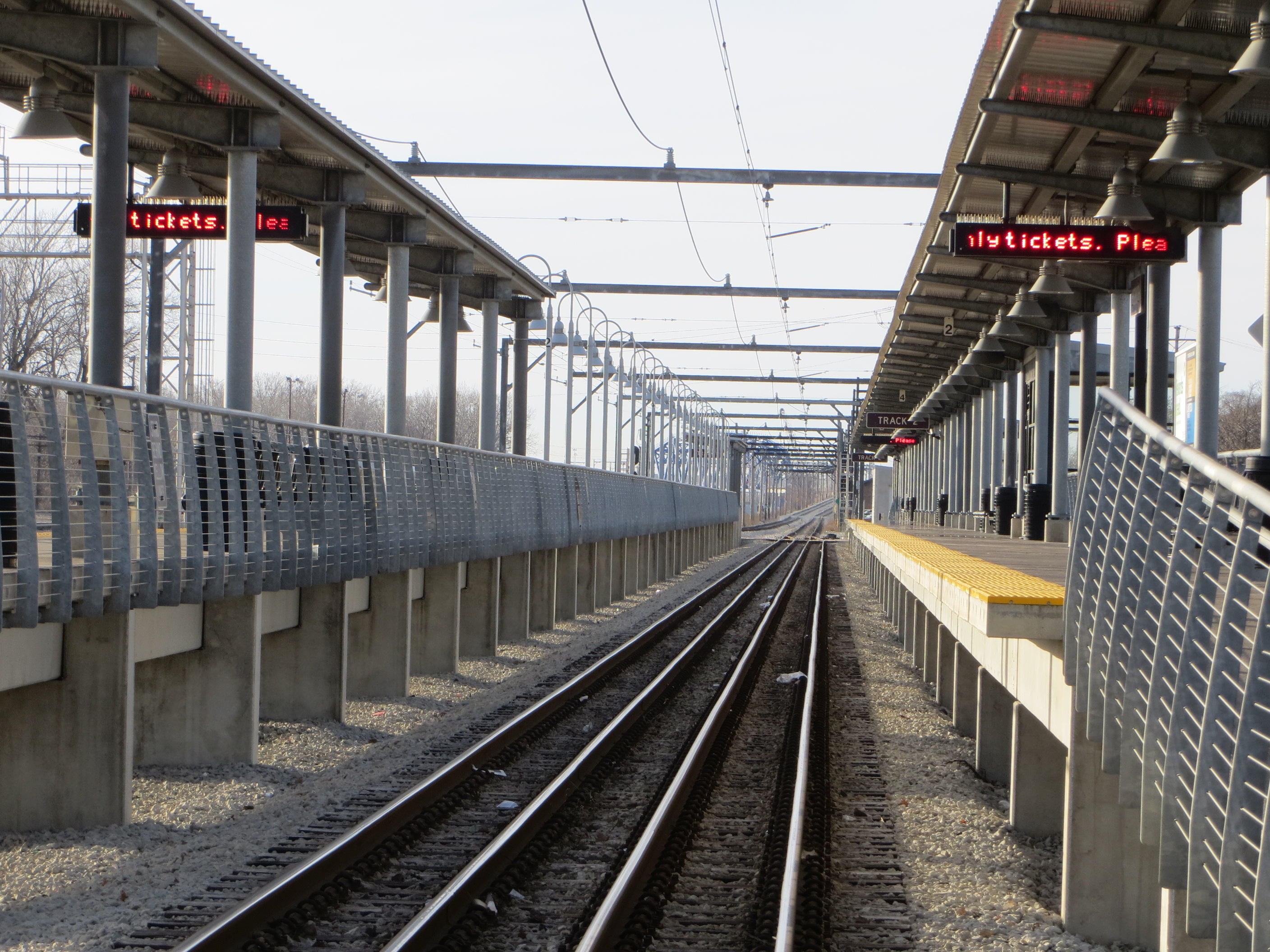
- Hegewisch station in April 2013.

General information
- Location: 13730 South Brainard Avenue; Hegewisch, Chicago, Illinois 60633
- Coordinates: 41°38′52″N 87°32′45″W
- Owner: Metra
- Platforms: 1 side platform, 1 island platform
- Tracks: 2 (gauntlet)

Construction
- Parking: Yes
- Accessible: Yes

Other information
- Fare zone: 3

History
- Rebuilt: June 1992

Passengers
- 2019: 862 (average weekday)

Services
Preceding station	NICTD	Following station
63rd Street toward Millennium Station	Lakeshore Corridor	Hammond Gateway toward South Bend International Airport
57th Street toward Millennium Station	Monon Corridor peak hours	South Hammond toward Munster/Dyer
Former services
Preceding station	NICTD	Following station
115th Street/Kensington toward Randolph Street	South Shore Line	Hammond toward South Bend
Track layout
Location

Hegewisch station is a commuter rail station in the city of Chicago, Illinois in the Hegewisch neighborhood, that serves the South Shore Line north to Millennium Station and east to the cities of Hammond, East Chicago, Gary, Michigan City, and South Bend, Indiana. The Hegewisch station has high-level platforms, as part of NICTD's continuing effort to comply with the Americans with Disabilities Act of 1990.

Hegewisch station is the South Shore Line's easternmost stop in Chicago and the last one in Illinois outbound, and offers pay parking. It is the only SSL station in Illinois that is served only by the South Shore Line and not the Metra Electric District. The station and parking lot is owned by Metra, despite not serving any Metra routes. Thus, there is a unique arrangement where fares are subject to Metra's fare structure. Therefore, when the South Shore Line adjusts its fares, the fares for Hegewisch do not change, but if Metra adjusts its fares, the fares at Hegewisch are adjusted accordingly.

== Description and history ==
Having broken ground in July 1991, current station facility was officially opened June 2, 1992. The station has a 3,000 square foot building, and cost Metra $1.7 million to construct. Soon after the current station building opened, the former station facility (located approximately 1,500 feet [460 m] west of the current one) was demolished.

The station is just west of an at-grade junction with a former Pennsylvania Railroad branch line (ex-South Chicago & Southern). The line began at the main line near the Illinois–Indiana state line and continued to a connection with the line to Logansport, Indiana. As of 2011, the tracks only exist to the former New York Central Railroad (ex-Michigan Central) line.

The Chicago and Western Indiana Railroad main line (carrying trains of the Erie, Monon, Chicago and Eastern Illinois, and Wabash railroads) ran parallel to the South Shore. The New York, Chicago and St. Louis Railroad also had its main line to the west of the C&WI.

A station typology adopted by the Chicago Plan Commission on October 16, 2014, assigns the Hegewisch station a typology of Mixed Residential/Industrial Neighborhood (MRIN). This typology is an area in which the Metra station serves both residential and industrial uses. Like most of the MRIN stations, it does not have access to CTA rail.

On July 25, 2024, a 22 year old woman, Grace Bentkowski, was fatally struck by a train while crossing a level crossing at this station. The crossing lacked any warning lights, crossing gates, or signage at the time of the incident. Bentkowski's family filed a lawsuit for wrongful death against Metra, citing the lack of safety measures for pedestrians at the station and the westbound train's engineer failing to sound the horn.

== Bus connections ==
CTA

- 30 South Chicago

Pace

- 358 Torrence (weekdays only)
- 364 159th Street (weekend service only)
