= Justice Haymond =

Justice Haymond may refer to:

- Alpheus F. Haymond (1823–1893), associate justice of the Supreme Court of Appeals of West Virginia
- Frank Cruise Haymond (1887–1972), associate justice of the Supreme Court of Appeals of West Virginia

== See also ==
- Justice Hammond (disambiguation)
