= Graham Hamond (disambiguation) =

Graham Hamond was a Royal Navy officer.

Graham or Graeme Ham(m)ond may also refer to:

- Graeme Hammond, American neurologist and sportsman
- Sir Graham Hamond-Graeme, 4th Baronet (1845–1920), of the Hamond-Graeme baronets

== See also ==
- Graham Hammonds, singer
