= Justice Hammond =

Justice Hammond may refer to:

- Edwin Hammond (1835–1920), associate justice of the Supreme Court of Indiana
- Hall Hammond (1902–1991), chief judge of the Maryland Court of Appeals
- John Wilkes Hammond (1837–1922), associate justice of the Massachusetts Supreme Judicial Court

== See also ==
- Justice Haymond (disambiguation)
