= Hammond, Fresno County, California =

Hammond
- District of Fresno, California; Former Unincorporated community
- Location in California
- Coordinates: 36°45′35″N 119°47′14″W
- Country: United States
- State: California
- County: Fresno County
- City: Fresno
- Elevation: 299 ft (91 m)

Hammond is a former unincorporated community in Fresno County, California, now incorporated into Fresno. It lies at an elevation of 299 feet (91 m).

It laid along the route of the Atchison, Topeka and Santa Fe Railway Valley Division.
