= Monon Trail =

Shared-use path and rail trail in Indiana

- The Monon Trail logo for the Northwest and Central Indiana Segments
- Length: 4.4 mi (7.1 km) (Northwest Indiana); 28.5 mi (45.9 km) (Central Indiana); 20.05 mi (32.27 km) (Monon South)
- Location: Lake, Hamilton, Marion, Lawrence, Orange, Washington, and Clark counties, Indiana.
- Established: 1996–present (in segments)
- Designation: USBR 35 (for Marion and portions of Hamilton county segments)
- Trailheads: Munster—Hammond; Indianapolis—Sheridan; New Pekin—Sellersburg
- Use: Shared use path
- Season: Year-round
- Surface: Asphalt
- Right of way: Monon Railroad
- Website: Northwest Indiana segment Central Indiana segment Monon South segment

Trail map
- Indianapolis area extent of the trail

The Monon Trail (known as the Monon Greenway in Carmel and Monon South in Southern Indiana) is a rail trail located entirely within the U.S. state of Indiana. It runs along the main line of the Monon Railroad, a popular railroad line connecting the cities of Chicago and Indianapolis and Louisville with stops at major locations. After the decline of railroad travel and the sale of the company in 1987, the portion of the line between Indianapolis and Delphi, Indiana, was abandoned.

The first portions of the trail were created in the late 1990s in central Indiana, but it has been consistently extended in both of its segments since then. There are currently three major segments:

- Northwest Indiana, 4.4 miles (7.1 km) long, running through Lake County from Munster to Hammond.
- Central Indiana, 28.5 miles (45.9 km) long, running through Hamilton and Marion counties, connecting Indianapolis, Carmel, Westfield, and Sheridan. The trail is a shared use path complete with trailheads, park amenities and connections to other trails and local attractions near it.
- Monon South, a planned 57 mile (97.2 km) trail between Mitchell and New Albany. Currently 20 miles (32.2 km) are completed across multiple sections, with the longest completed section 10 miles (16 km) between New Pekin and Sellersburg.

Through Indianapolis and Carmel the Monon Trail is part of U.S. Bicycle Route 35.

== Northwest Indiana segment ==
Northwest Indiana's portion of the Monon covers 4.4 miles (7.1 km), starting at the Pennsy Greenway near the Illinois–Indiana border in Munster, and running north to the Erie Lackawanna Trailhead in downtown Hammond.

In 2014, the trail was significantly extended, with a segment opening between Munster and Hammond. The segment connected a previously existing portion of the Monon Trail located entirely within Munster. The extension required the reconstruction of the old 1909 railroad bridge across the Little Calumet River, at a cost of approximately $1.5 million.

The Northern Indiana Commuter Transportation District, which operates the South Shore commuter rail service, reconstructed a portion of the rail route along the old Monon right-of-way. The Monon Corridor provides service from southern Lake County communities to and from Hammond and downtown Chicago; service began in 2026.

Portions of the Monon Trail in Lake County
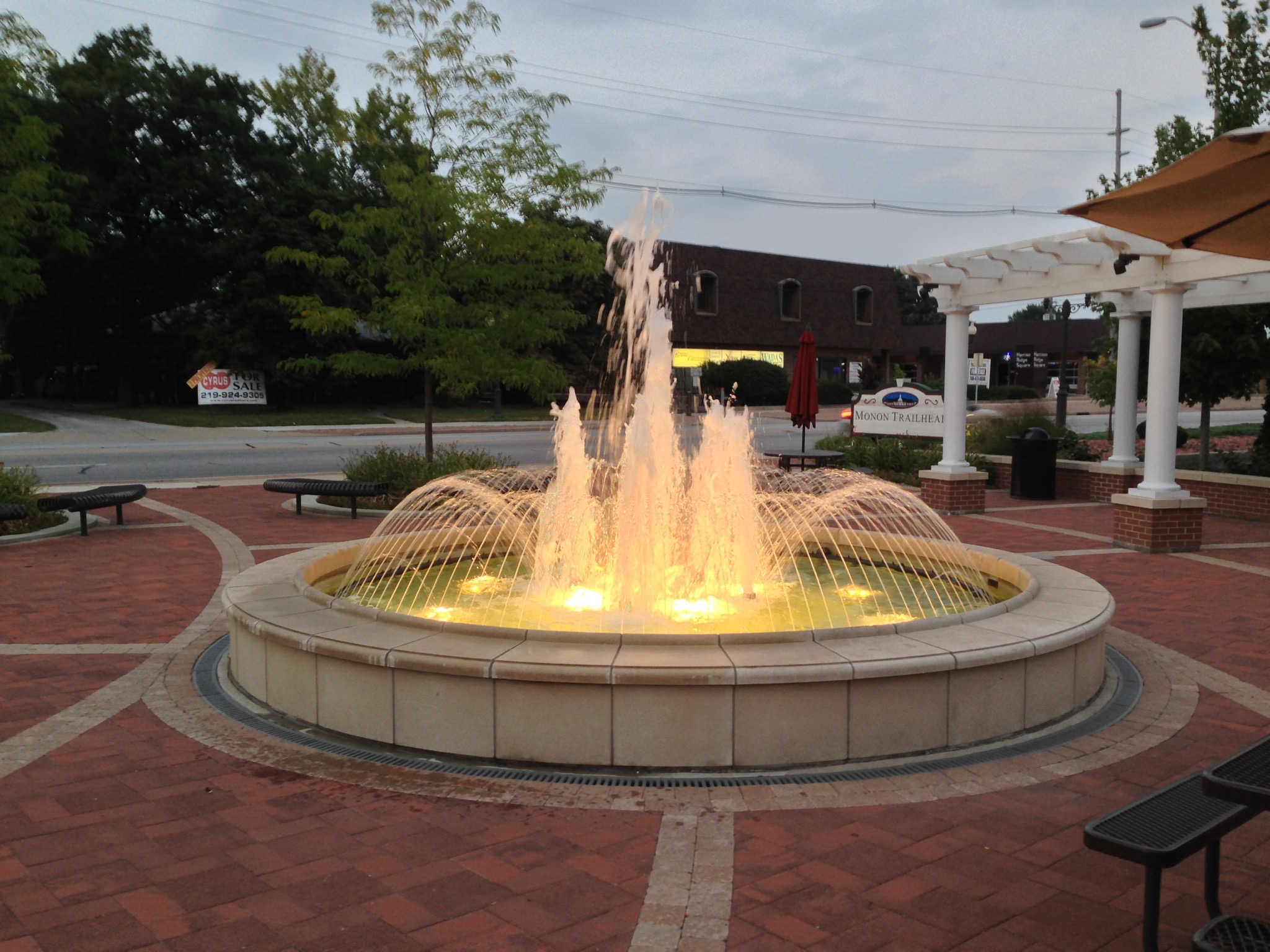
The Monon Trailhead in downtown Munster was built in 2012.

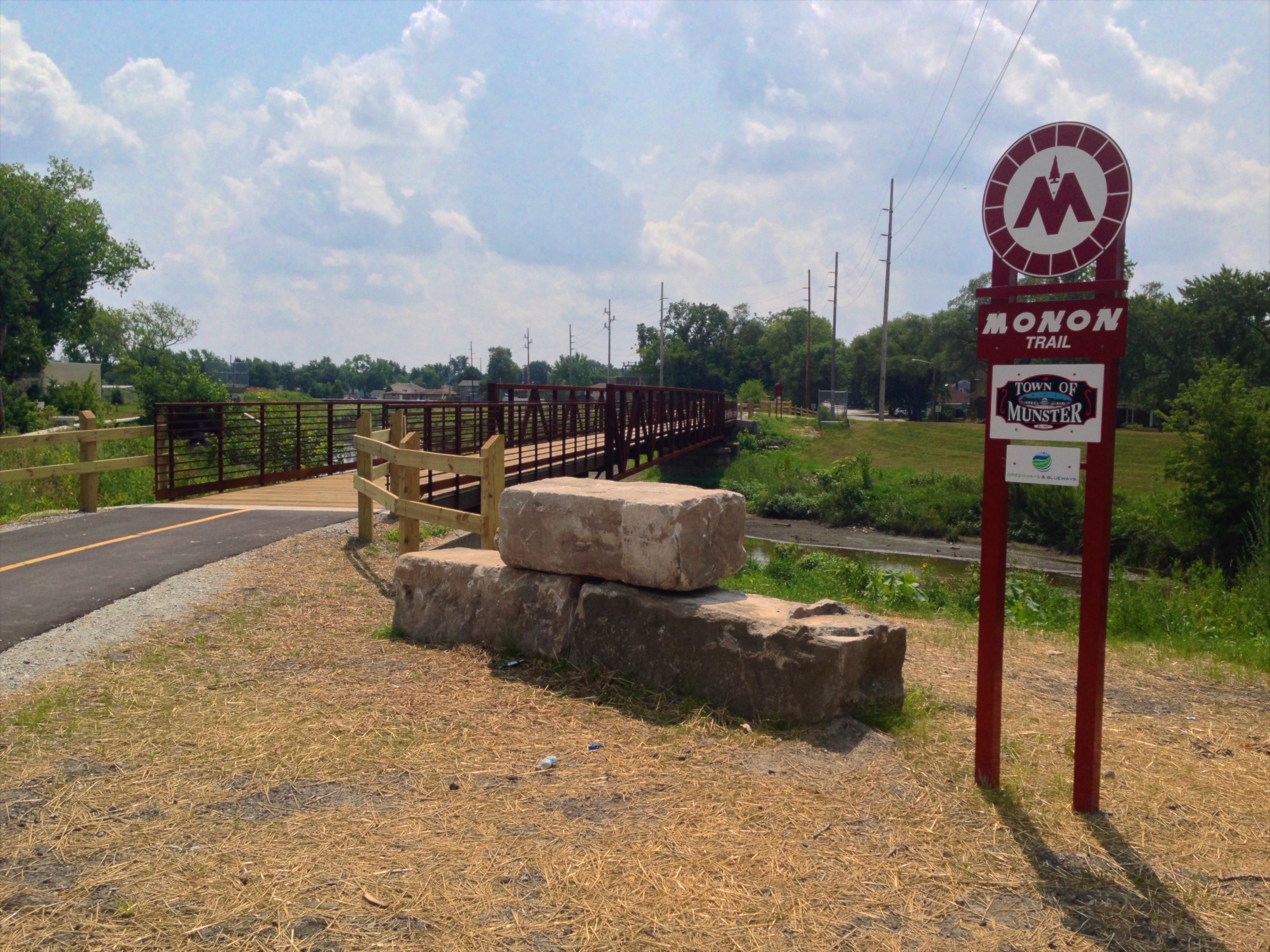
The 1909 railroad bridge over the Little Calumet River was rebuilt in 2014 as a trail bridge.

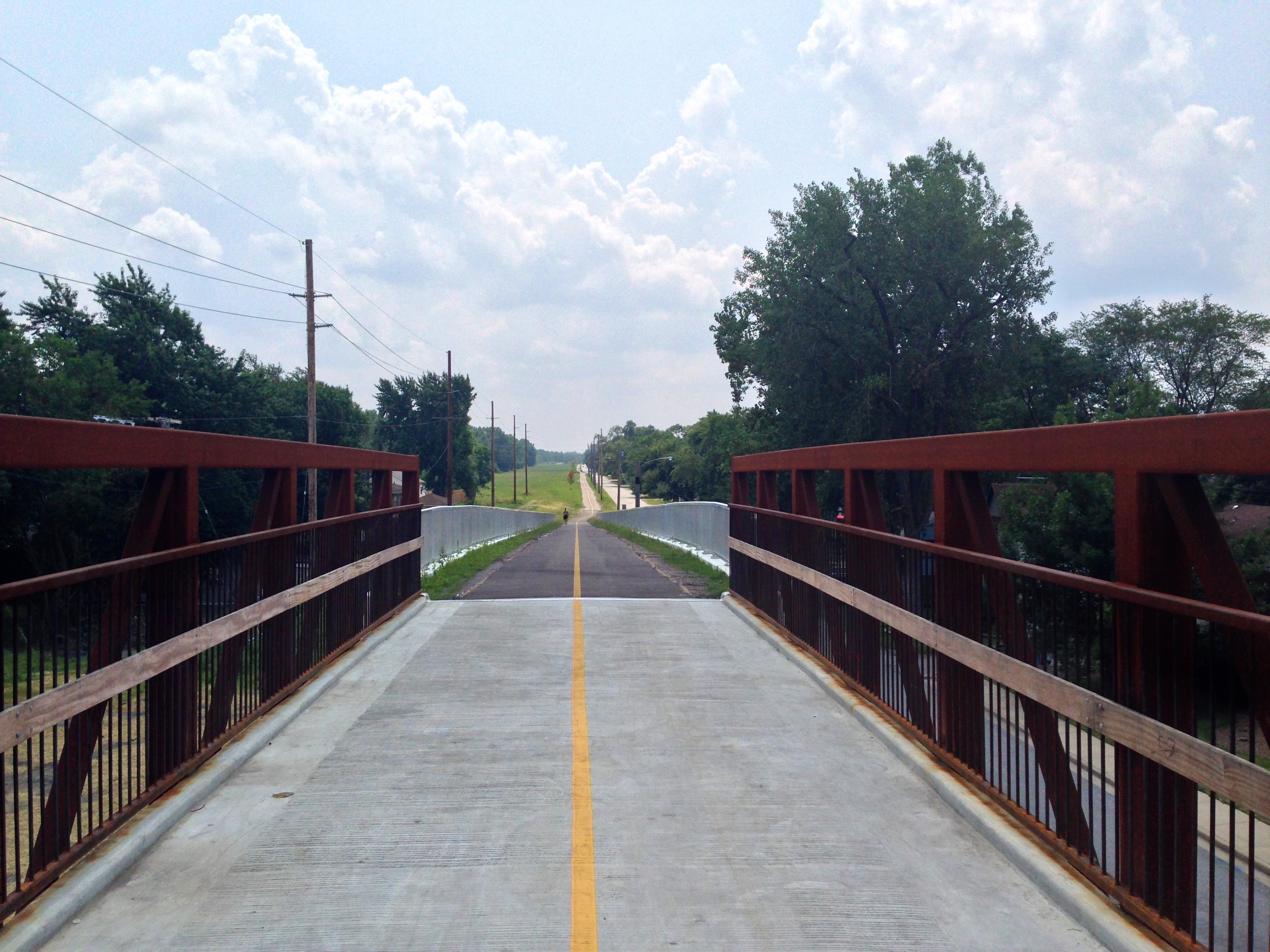
View of the Monon Trail looking south from the bridge over 165th St. in Hammond

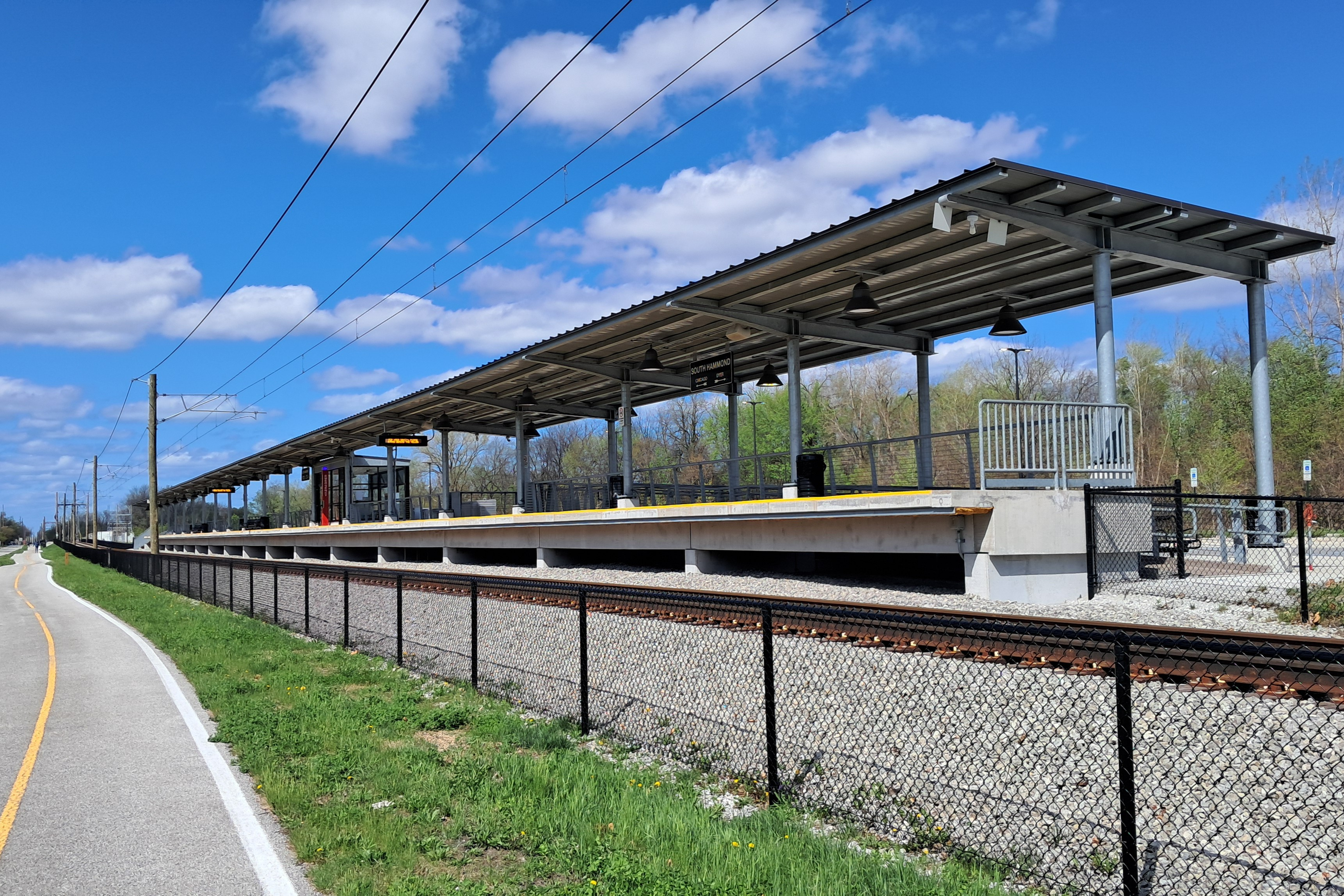
Monon Trail at South Hammond station.

== Central Indiana segment ==
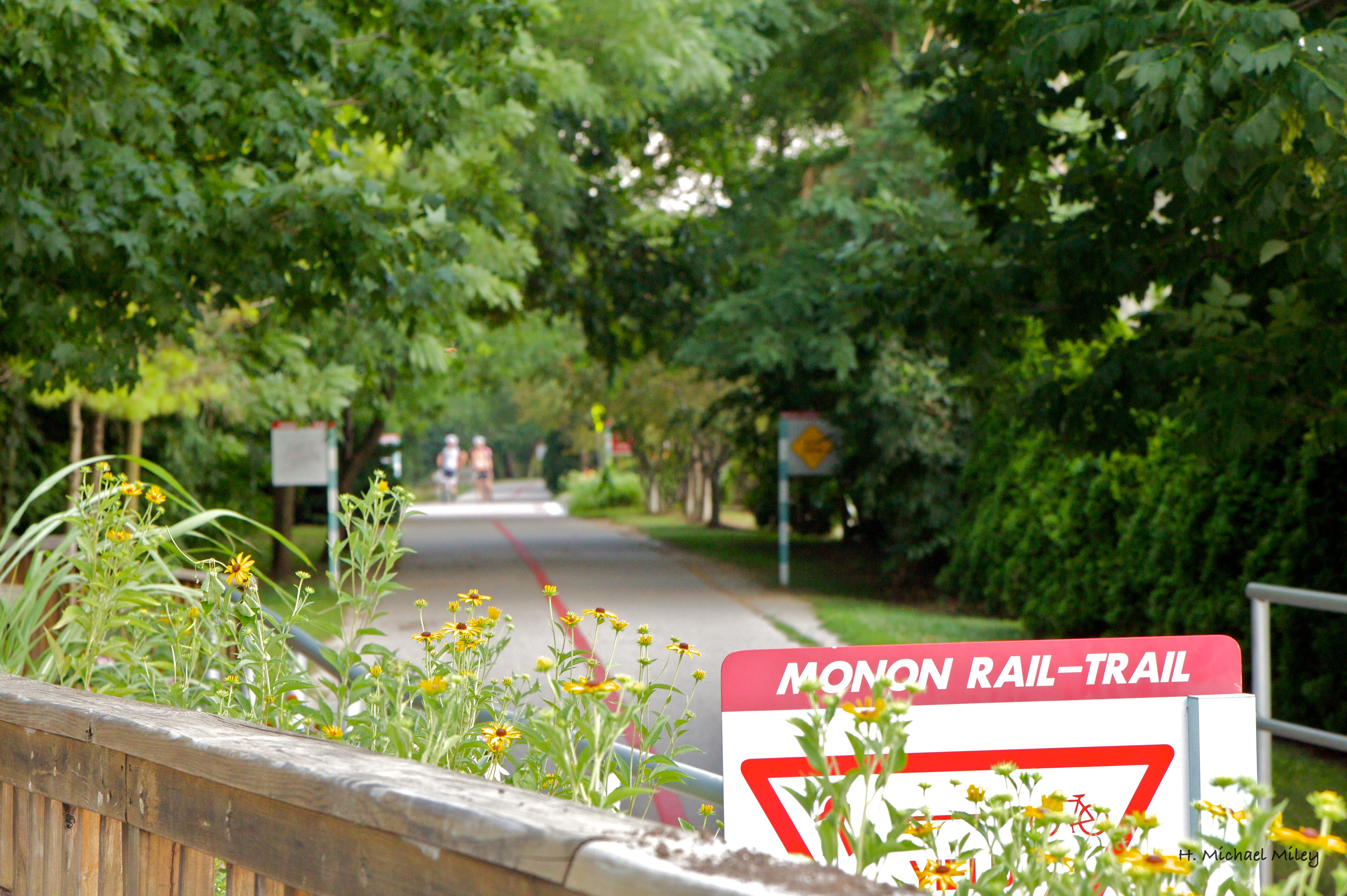
The Monon Trail traverses Indianapolis's north side neighborhoods.

Central Indiana's portion of the Monon covers 28.5 miles (45.9 km), beginning at 10th Street in Downtown Indianapolis, and passing through various neighborhoods and suburban cities before ending in Sheridan at the Hamilton-Boone county line. Plans to create a shared use trail on the former Monon right-of-way date back to the late 1980s.

In the Indianapolis metro area, the Monon Trail is used by more than 1.3 million people annually. The trail has been cited as having a positive economic impact to neighborhoods adjacent to the trail, including Broad Ripple in Indianapolis and the mixed-use developments of downtown Carmel, which have experienced a large growth in population over the past decade.

=== Indianapolis ===
Construction of the Indianapolis segment occurred in phases between 1995 and 2004.

Within the city of Indianapolis, the trail passes through a number of neighborhoods, including Martindale's Hillside neighborhood, the Mapleton-Fall Creek, Meridian-Kessler, Broad Ripple, and Nora neighborhoods. Additionally, the Monon connects with a number of other trails, including the Central Canal Towpath along the Indiana Central Canal, the Fall Creek Greenway, the Nickel Plate Trail, and the Pogues Run Trail. In March 2021, a pedestrian bridge was completed that crossed 38th Street, eliminating a dangerous crossing for trail users. There are plans to build another bridge over 86th Street.

Visitor attractions along the trail in Indianapolis include:

- Indiana State Fairgrounds
- Indy Art Center
- Broad Ripple Village
- Marrott Woods Nature Preserve

=== Hamilton County ===
Construction of the trail in Hamilton County began in 2001 and was completed in 2025.

The first segment of the trail in Hamilton County was constructed in Carmel and opened in the fall of 2001. The Carmel segment stretches 5.2-mile (8.4 km) between 96th Street and 146th Street. This first phase of trail construction cost approximately $5.5 million. The trail was first extended into Westfield starting in the fall of 2008, and was gradually expanded north towards Sheridan, Indiana. The trail extends a total of 7.9 miles (12.7 km) in Westfield Township. The final segment of the trail in Hamilton County was opened in Sheridan on October 3, 2025.

In Hamilton County, the trail provides access to several other pedestrian trails, including the Midland Trace Trail, Hagan-Burke Trail, 106 Trail, and Little Eagle Creek Trail.

Visitor attractions along the trail in Hamilton County include:

- Monon Depot Museum
- Carmel City Center
- Monon Community Center
- Grand Park
- The Palladium at Allied Solutions Center for the Performing Arts
Portions of the Monon Trail in Marion and Hamilton counties
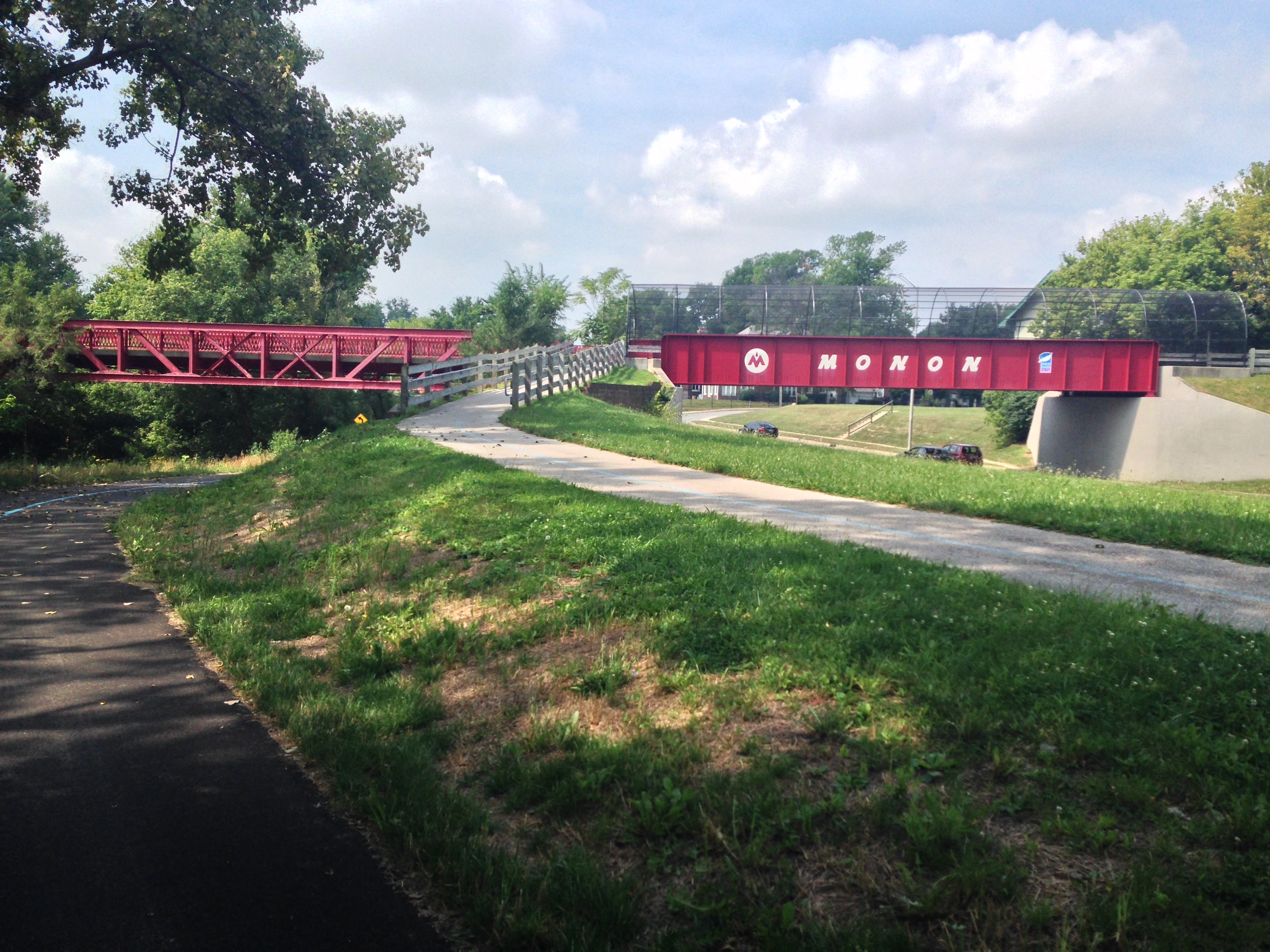
An original Monon Railroad bridge was repurposed as a trail overpass in Indianapolis.

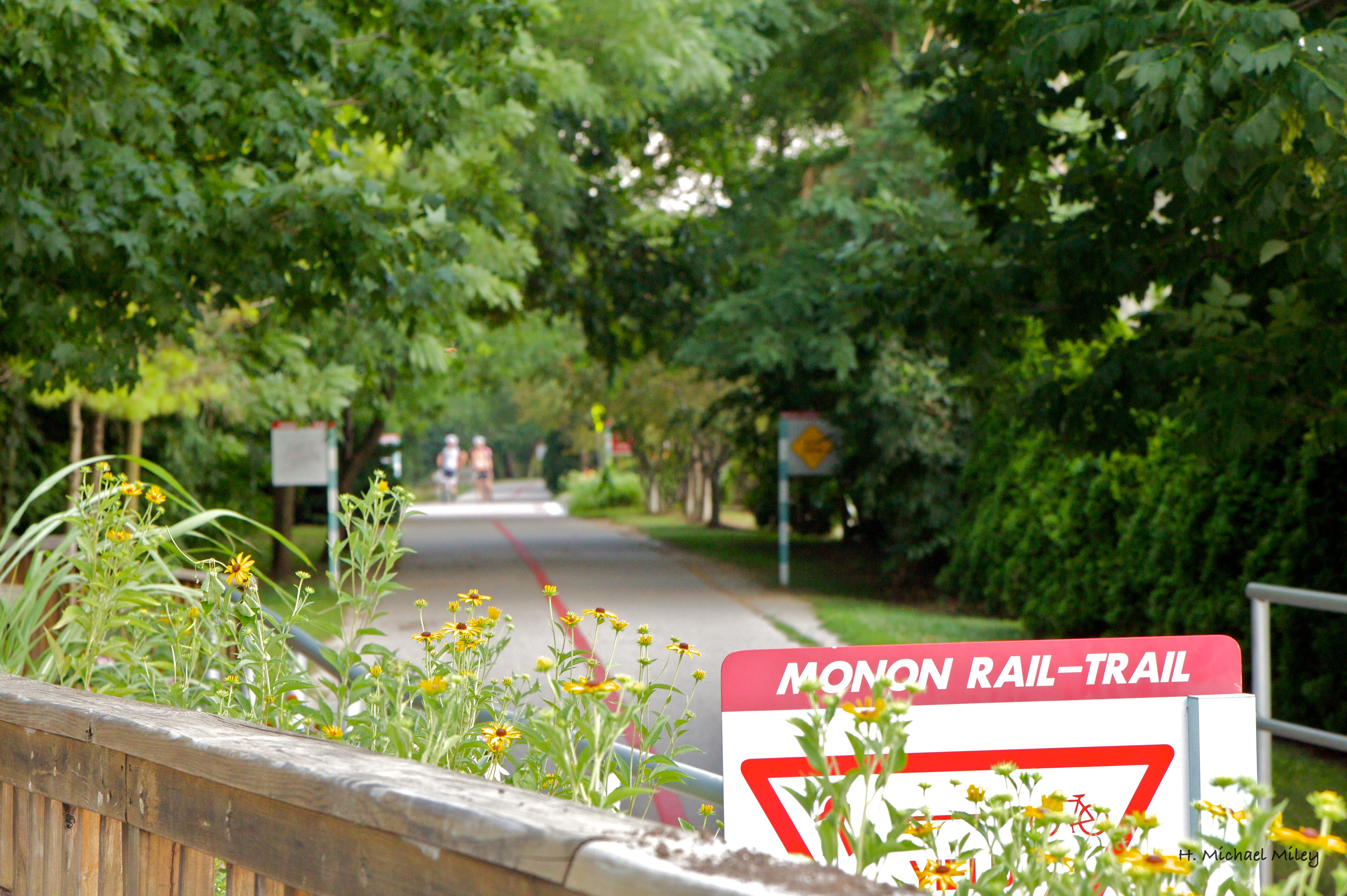
The trail traverses Indianapolis's north side neighborhoods.

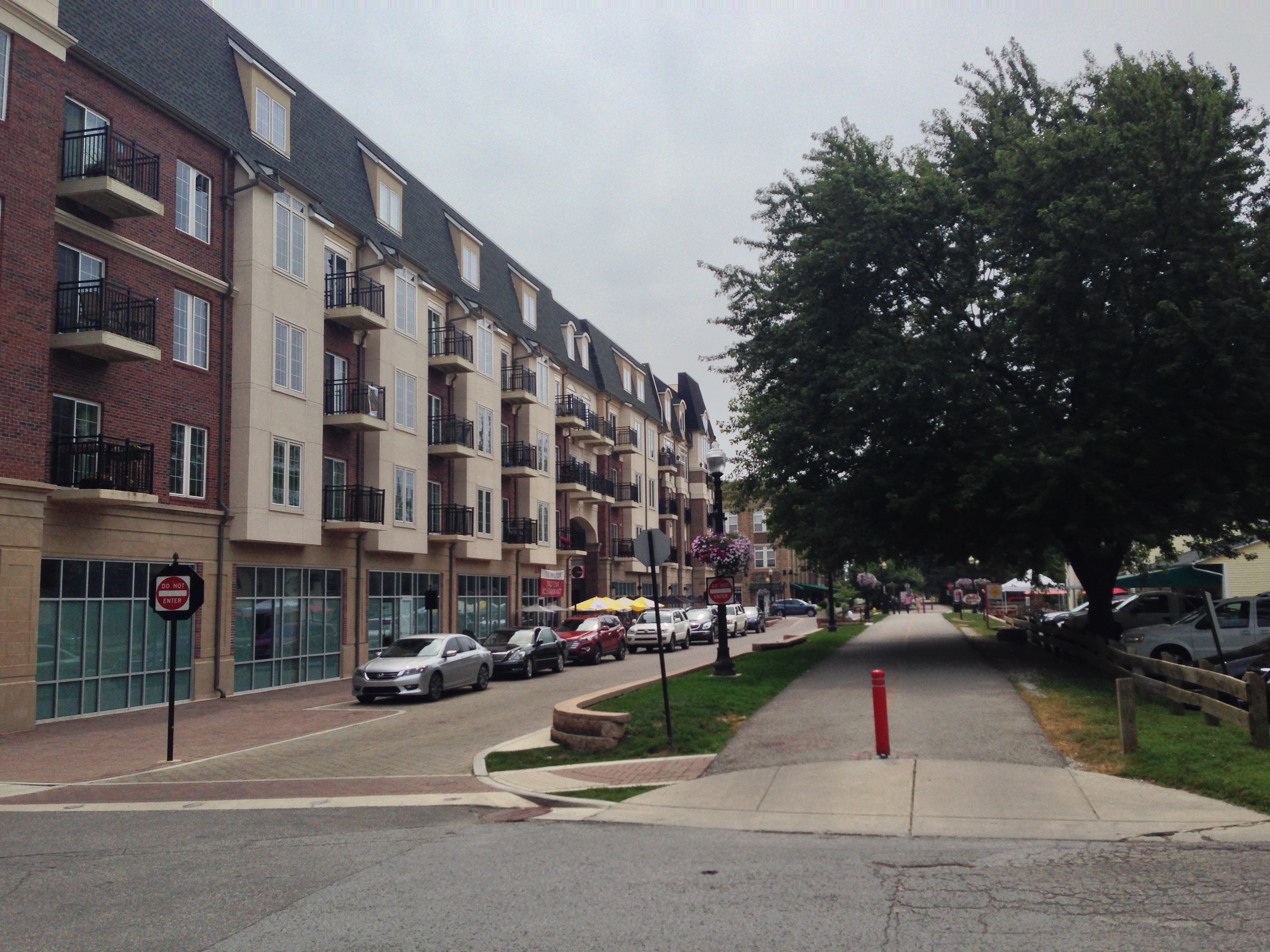
A mixed-use development in downtown Carmel surrounds the Monon Greenway.

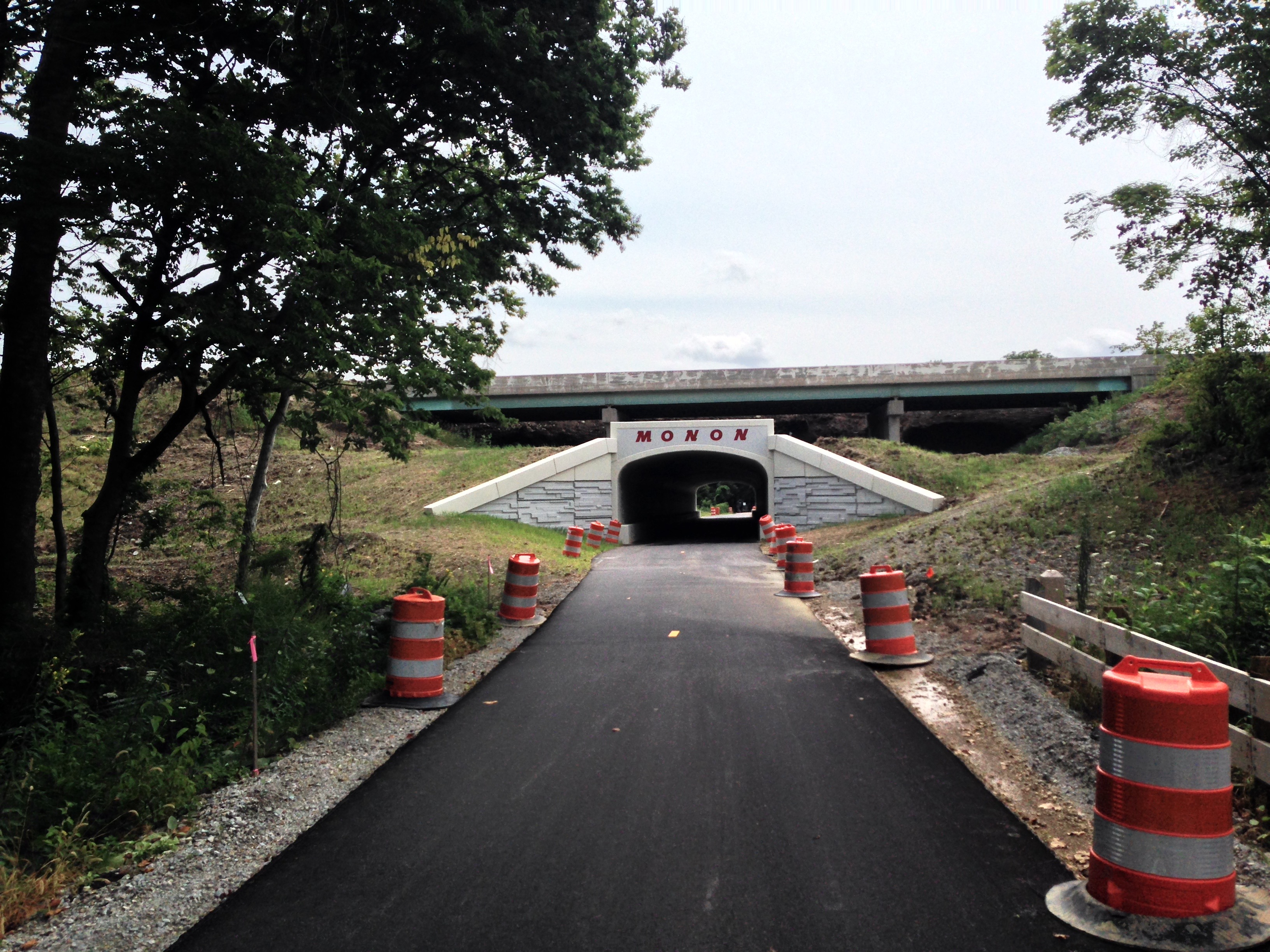
North of Carmel, the greenway passes under U.S. Route 31 heading towards Westfield.

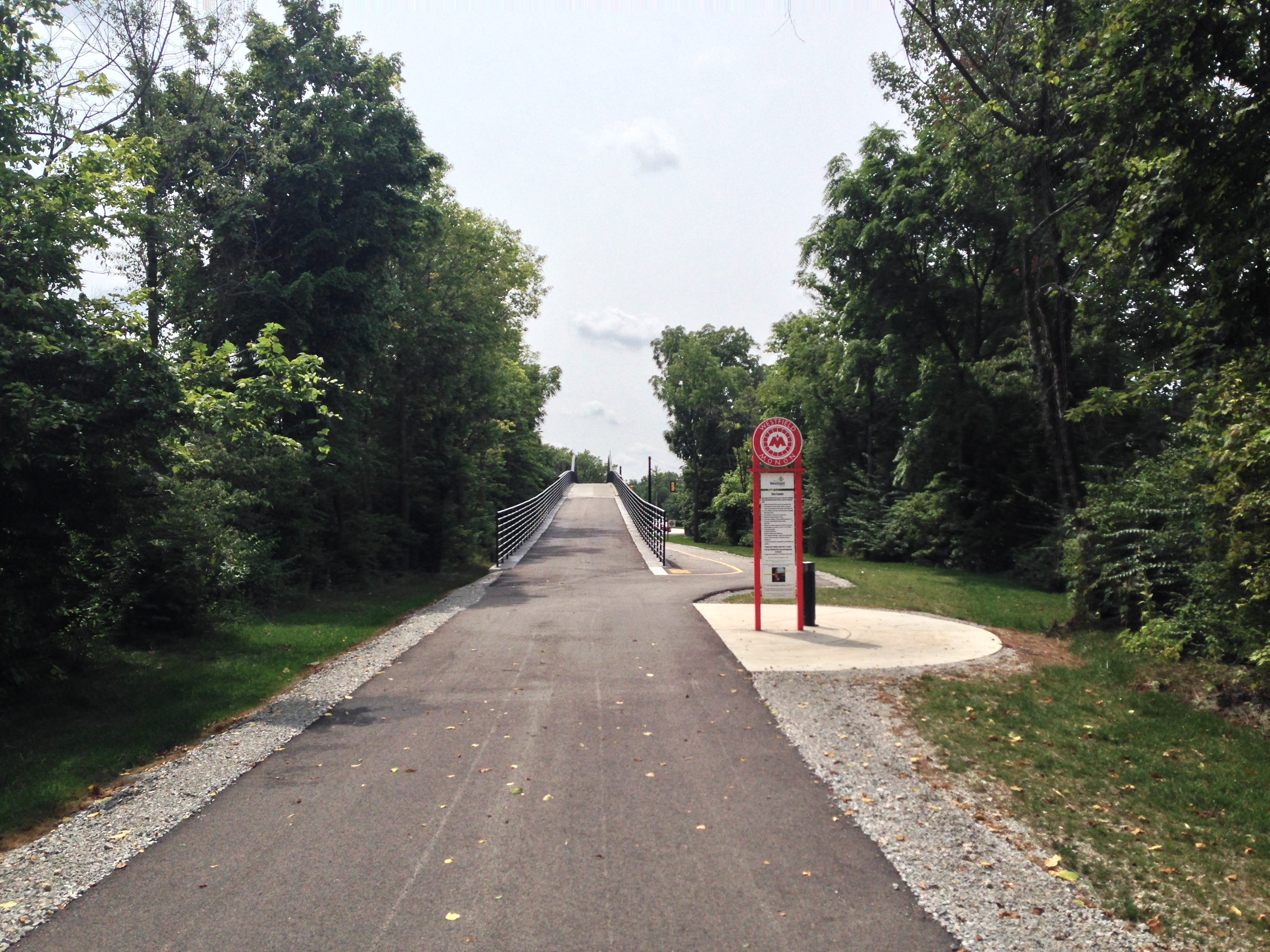
An overpass was created in Carmel's section of the greenway, spanning 146th St.

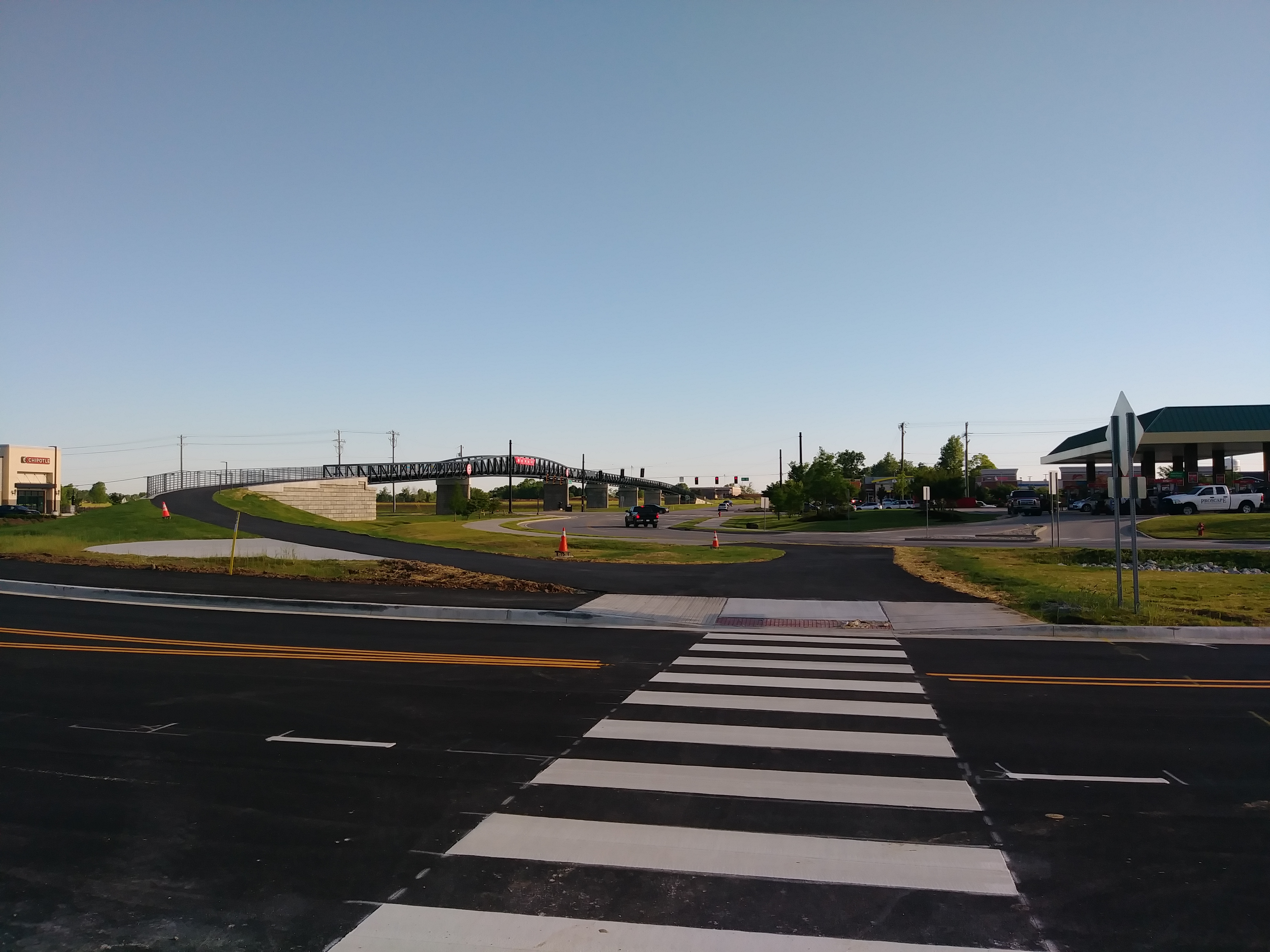
A bridge over East 176th Street in Westfield, opened in May 2020.

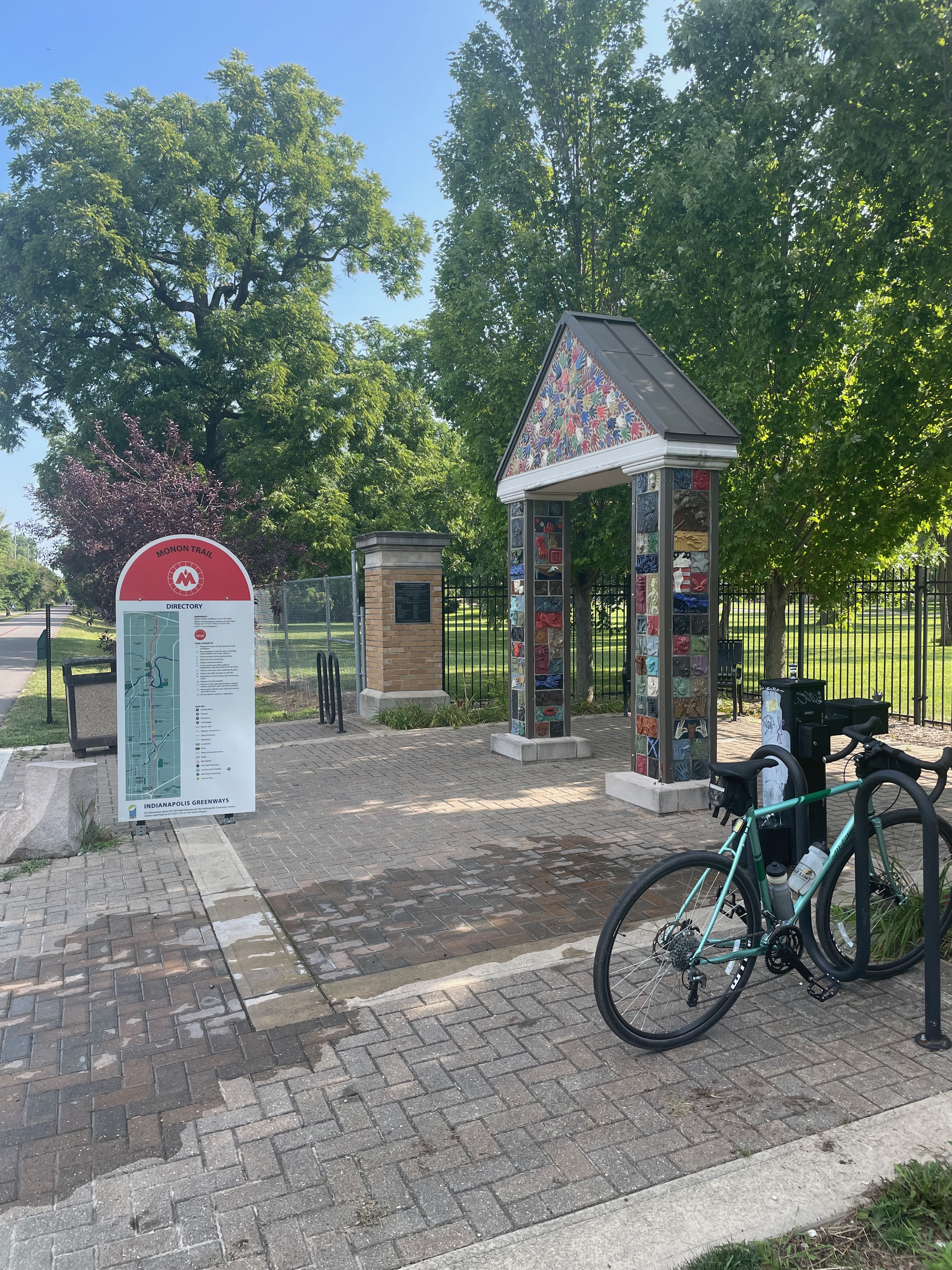
Plaza near the Indiana School for the Deaf and 42nd Street in Indianapolis.

== Monon South segment ==
The Monon South was established in 2023 as part of a Next Level Trails grant from the Indiana Department of Natural Resources to purchase 62 miles (100 km) of the former the Monon railroad. The first dedicated stretch was a 24-mile (39 km) section in Mitchell, completed in January 2025. Phase 1A was officially completed in July, 2025. It consists of five distinct segments totaling 20 miles (32 km), with sections in Mitchell, Campbellsburg, Salem, New Pekin, Borden, and Sellersburg. The trail is eventually planned to connect to a future Monon South Freedom Trail in New Albany that will tie into the regional Ohio River Greenway trail system in Clark and Jefferson counties.

== Future expansion ==
Plans exist to further extend the Monon Trail north into the town of Kirklin in Clinton County.

== See also ==
- B-Line Trail, a trail in Bloomington, Indiana also built on a portion of the Monon
