= Hammond School =

Hammond School may refer to,

- Hammond School, England, professional performing arts school in Chester, United Kingdom
- Hammond School (South Carolina), in Columbia, South Carolina
- Hammond High School (Columbia, Maryland), in Columbia, Maryland
- Hammond High School (Indiana) in Hammond, Indiana
- Hammond High School (Louisiana) in Hammond, Louisiana
- Francis C. Hammond Middle School, formerly Hammond High School, in Alexandria, Virginia
