= Hammond Gateway station =

South Shore Line station in Indiana

Hammond Gateway
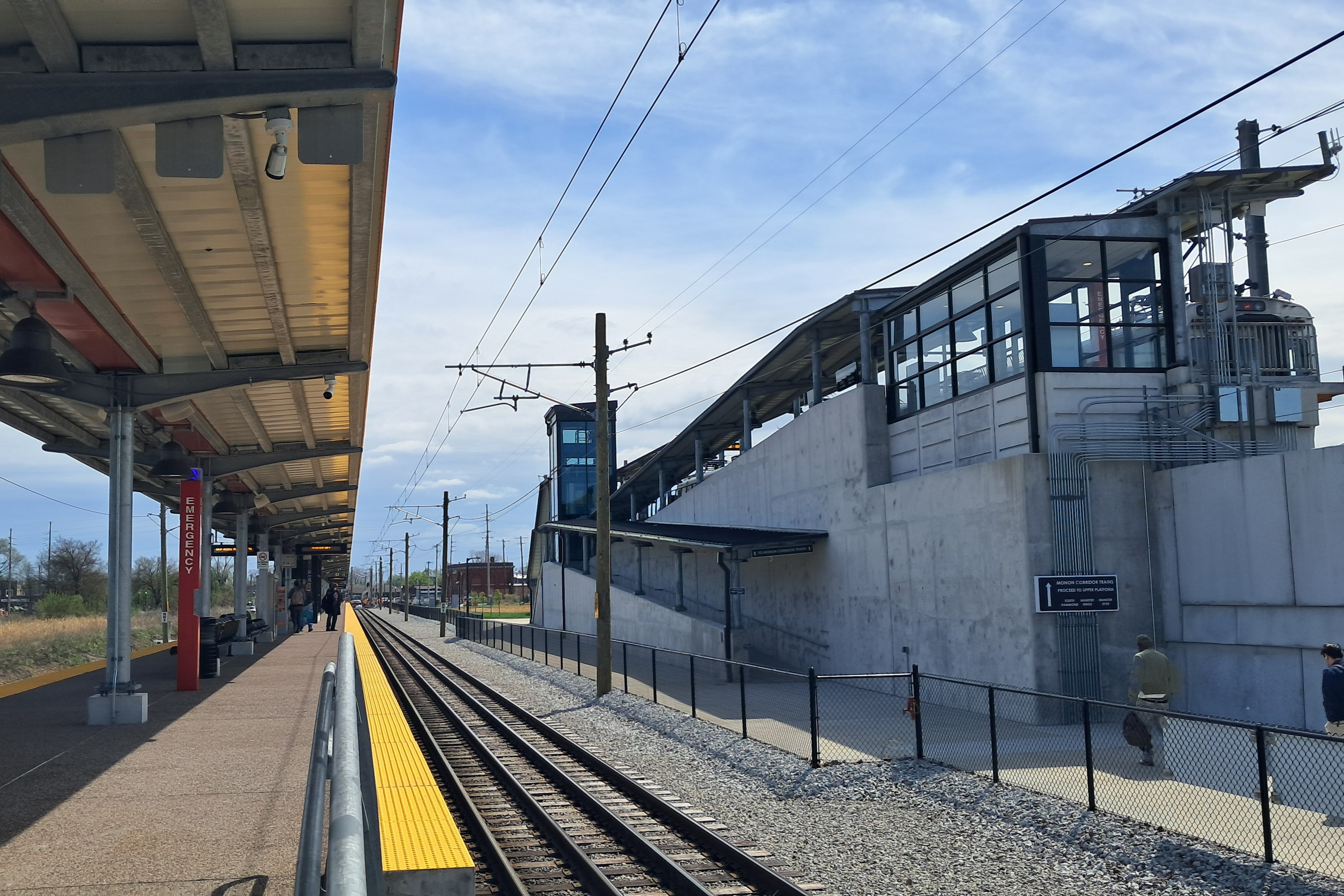
- Hammond Gateway station with platforms for the Lakeshore Corridor (left) and the Monon Corridor (right), April 2026

General information
- Location: 4530 Sheffield Avenue; Hammond, Indiana
- Coordinates: 41.631047°N 87.521384°W
- Platforms: 1 island platform (Lakeshore Corridor); 1 side platform (Monon Corridor)
- Tracks: 3 (2 Lakeshore Corridor, 1 Monon Corridor)
- Connections: GPTC: R6

Construction
- Structure type: At-grade (Lakeshore Corridor); Elevated (Monon Corridor)
- Parking: Yes
- Accessible: Yes

Other information
- Fare zone: 4

History
- Opened: October 18, 2024

Services
Preceding station	NICTD	Following station
Hegewisch toward Millennium Station	Lakeshore Corridor	East Chicago toward South Bend International Airport
Terminus	Monon Corridor	South Hammond toward Munster/Dyer
Future services
Preceding station	NICTD	Following station
Terminus	Monon Corridor	Downtown Hammond toward Munster/Dyer
Track layout
Key
Location

Hammond Gateway station is a South Shore Line station in Hammond, Indiana. It is the interchange point to the Monon Corridor. Hammond Gateway station opened on October 18, 2024; the previous Hammond station, located nearby, was closed on the same day.

== Layout and services ==
Hammond Gateway station has three tracks — two for the original South Shore Line (Lakeshore Corridor) and one for the Monon Corridor. An island platform between the rerouted main line tracks replaced the side platforms on the old Hammond station; a side platform serves the Monon Corridor at an elevated single-track railroad. The two platforms are connected via a pedestrian walkway.

Monon Corridor trains bypass Hammond Gateway and continue to Millennium Station at peak service hours or terminate here as short turns at other times, with transfers available on the main line platform.

== History ==
=== Original station ===
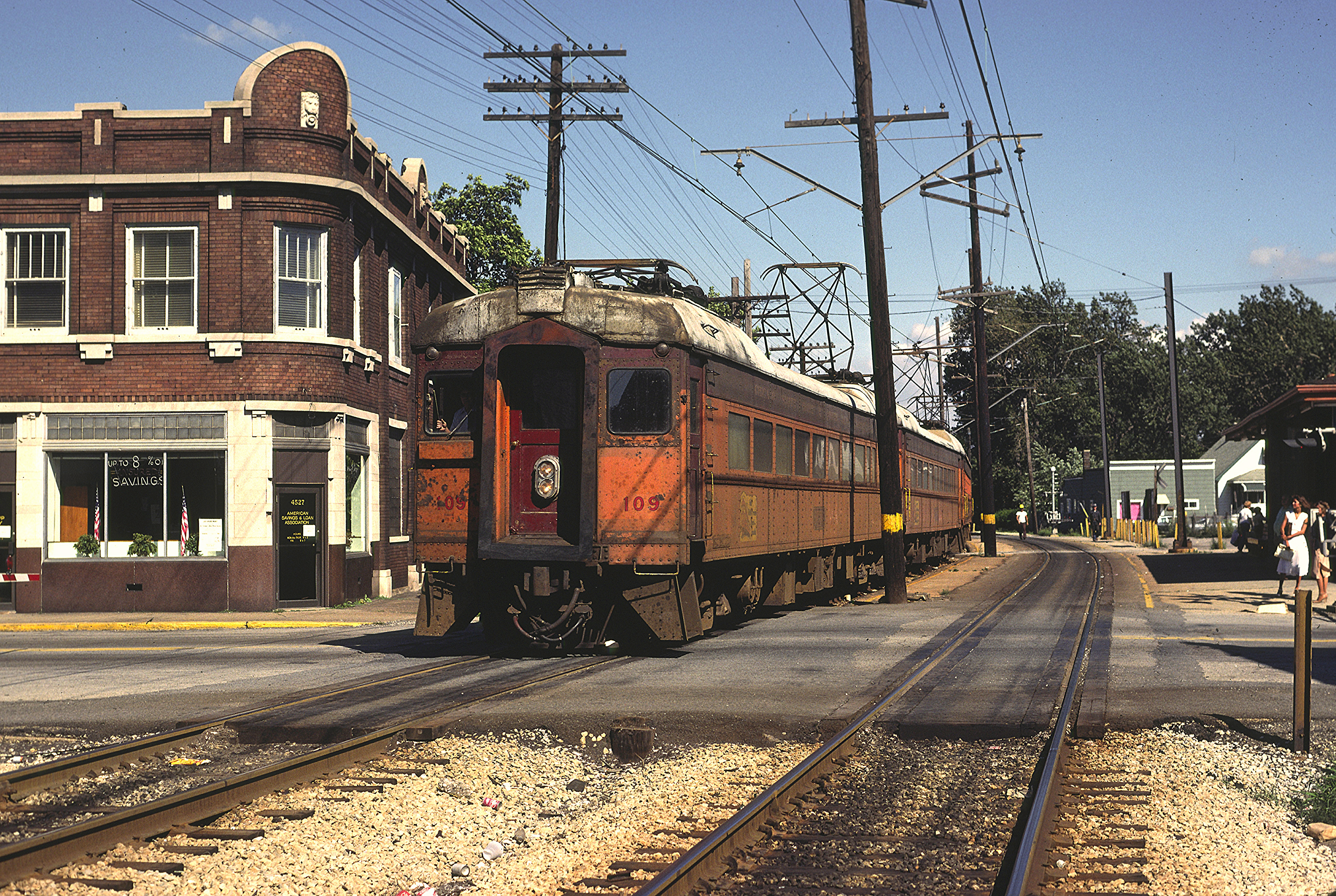
A train stopping at Hammond, c. August 1980, as seen before modernization

Originally, South Shore Line trains called at a station located at 4531 Hohman Avenue, which was simply named Hammond station. It consisted of a pair of high-level platforms located between the crossings of Hohman and Johnson Avenues. The southern platform was a side platform that served eastbound trains to Michigan City and South Bend while the northern platform, situated between the two tracks, was an island platform that served westbound trains to Chicago. The tracks through the station were gauntlet tracks which permitted the passage of freight trains. A stucco-finished station building was located east of Hohman Avenue, south of the tracks. Early on, it featured a lunch counter, restrooms, a waiting room, and a staffed ticket counter. The station staff were later removed, with it instead only being equipped with a ticket machine. To the east of the station was a parking lot with capacity for 718 cars.

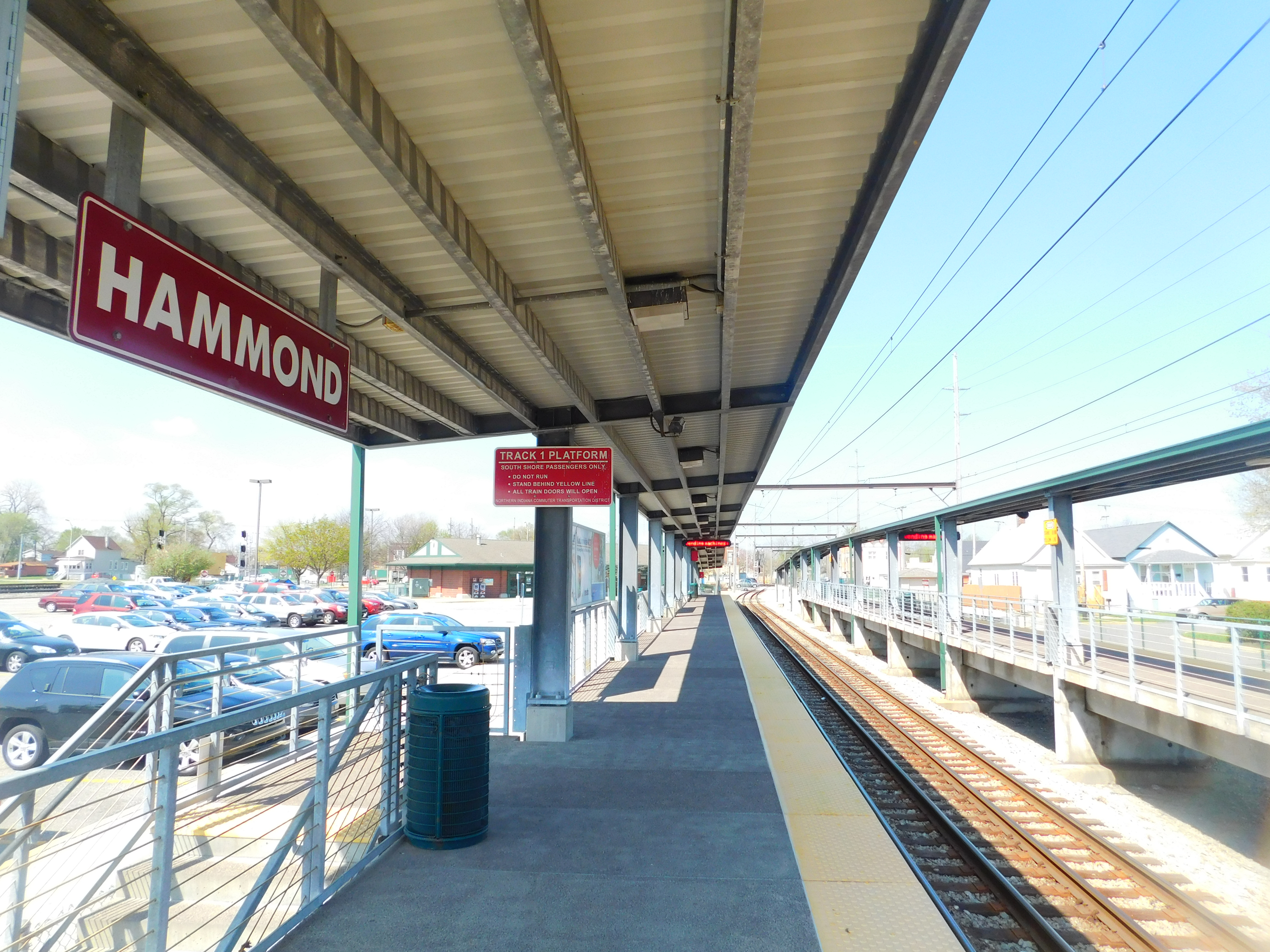
Later iteration of Hammond station

The station originally had ground-level platforms, but in 1998, those were replaced with high-level platforms to allow for level boarding and increased accessibility. A new station building was constructed that year. A bench and some platform pavers were salvaged from the old depot and reused to furnish the new structure.

=== New station ===
In 2017, the NICTD began demolition of houses between Hanover and Brunswick streets to begin construction of a new right-of-way and station. The City of Hammond's financial contribution to the West Lake Corridor project was dependent on construction of the new interchange station. The new station, dubbed Hammond Gateway, opened on October 18, 2024; the previous station, located 0.15 miles (0.24 km) to the east, was closed on the same day. Monon Corridor trains began serving the station on March 31, 2026, with the opening of the branch line.

== Bibliography ==
- Longest, David E. (2007). Railroad Depots of Northern Indiana. Arcadia Publishing. ISBN 978-0-7385-4131-0. OL 7901853M.
- Ogorek, Cynthia L. (2012). Along the Chicago South Shore & South Bend Rail Line. Images of America. Charleston, South Carolina: Arcadia Publishing. ISBN 978-0-738-59419-4. OL 25977909M.
