= Hammond Township, Polk County, Minnesota =

Hammond Township, Minnesota
- Township
- Location of Hammond Township, within Polk County, Minnesota
- Coordinates: 47°38′12″N 96°38′18″W
- Country: United States
- State: Minnesota
- County: Polk

Area
  - Total: 36.3 sq mi (94.1 km^{2})
  - Land: 36.3 sq mi (94.1 km^{2})
  - Water: 0 sq mi (0.0 km^{2})
- Elevation: 876 ft (267 m)

Population (2020)
  - Total: 45
  - Density: 1.2/sq mi (0.48/km^{2})
- Time zone: UTC-6 (Central (CST))
  - Summer (DST): UTC-5 (CDT)
- FIPS code: 27-26810
- GNIS feature ID: 0664382

Hammond Township is a township in Polk County, Minnesota, United States. It is part of the Grand Forks-ND-MN Metropolitan Statistical Area. The population was 45 at the 2020 census.

Hammond Township was organized in 1880.

== Geography ==
According to the United States Census Bureau, the township has a total area of 36.3 square miles (94 km^{2}), all land.

== Demographics ==
As of the census of 2000, there were 57 people, 19 households, and 17 families residing in the township. The population density was 1.6 inhabitants per square mile (0.62/km^{2}). There were 19 housing units at an average density of 0.5 per square mile (0.19/km^{2}). The racial makeup of the township was 100.00% White.

There were 19 households, out of which 52.6% had children under the age of 18 living with them, 84.2% were married couples living together, 5.3% had a female householder with no husband present, and 10.5% were non-families. 10.5% of all households were made up of individuals, and 5.3% had someone living alone who was 65 years of age or older. The average household size was 3.00 and the average family size was 3.24.

In the township, the population was spread out, with 33.3% under the age of 18, 5.3% from 18 to 24, 22.8% from 25 to 44, 24.6% from 45 to 64, and 14.0% who were 65 years of age or older. The median age was 36 years. For every 100 females, there were 103.6 males. For every 100 females age 18 and over, there were 90.0 males.

The median income for a household in the township was $48,125, and the median income for a family was $48,125. Males had a median income of $90,957 versus $23,750 for females. The per capita income for the township was $24,863. None of the population or the families were below the poverty line.
