= Munster/Dyer station =

South Shore Line station in Indiana

Munster/Dyer
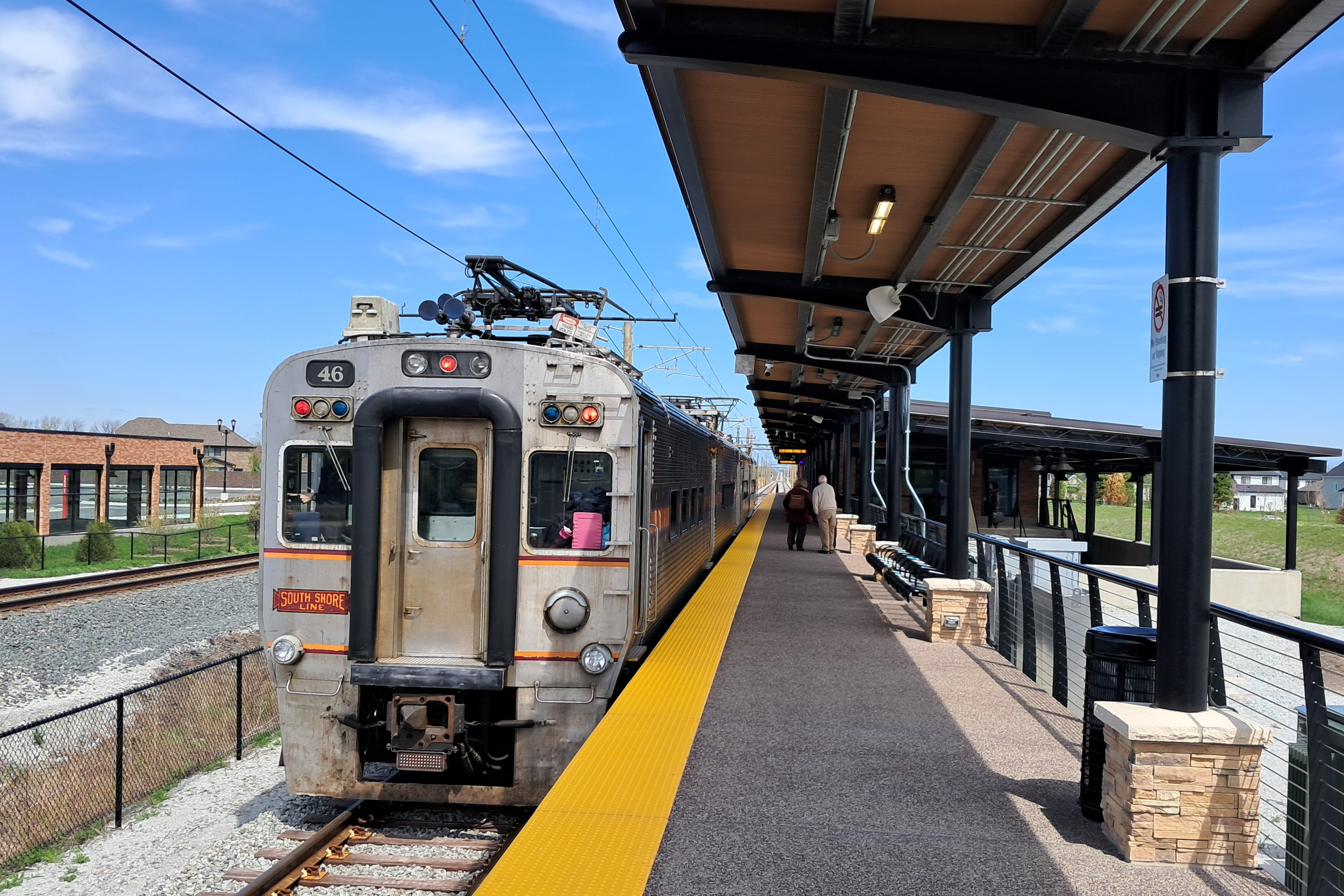

General information
- Location: 10412 Allison Drive; Munster, Indiana 46324
- Coordinates: 41.522680°N 87.518028°W
- Owner: NICTD
- Lines: NICTD Monon Corridor; CSX Monon Subdivision
- Platforms: 1 side platform
- Tracks: 1 NICTD; 1 CSX

Construction
- Accessible: Yes

Other information
- Fare zone: 5

History
- Opened: March 31, 2026
- Electrified: Overhead line, 1,500 V DC

Services
Preceding station	NICTD	Following station
Munster Ridge toward Hammond Gateway or Millennium Station	Monon Corridor	Terminus
Location

Munster/Dyer station is a South Shore Line rail station located at the foot of Main Street on the border of Munster and Dyer, Indiana. The station and main (non-ADA) parking lot itself reside solely within Munster town limits while ADA Parking and Kiss N Ride Dropoff reside within the Dyer town limits. The station is adjacent to the CSX Monon Subdivision, but utilizes new tracks. Intended to serve as the southern terminus of the Monon Corridor, it opened to revenue service on March 31, 2026. Dyer Amtrak station is located about 0.5 miles (0.8 km) to the south.
