= City of Miami (train) =

Passenger train

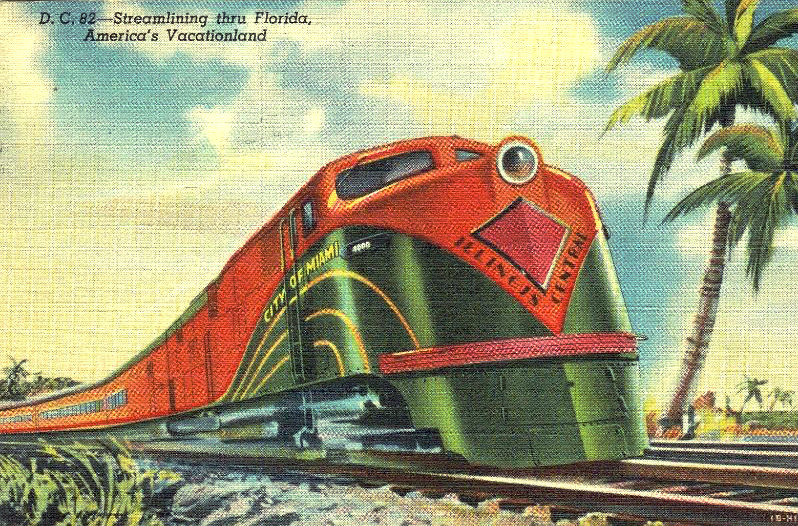
- Postcard depiction of the train, circa 1940s.

Overview
- Service type: Inter-city rail
- Status: Discontinued
- Locale: Midwestern United States/Southeastern United States
- First service: December 18, 1940
- Last service: April 30, 1971
- Former operators: Illinois Central Railroad; Central of Georgia; Atlantic Coast Line Railroad (1940–1967); Seaboard Coast Line (1967–1971); Florida East Coast (1940–1963)

Route
- Termini: Chicago, Illinois; Miami, Florida
- Stops: 39
- Distance travelled: 1,494 miles (2,404 km) (1941); 1,544 miles (2,485 km) (1971)
- Average journey time: Northbound: 31 hrs 00 min Southbound: 32 hrs 25 min
- Service frequency: Every third day (1940–1957); Every other day (1957–1971)
- Train numbers: Northbound: 52; Southbound: 53

On-board services
- Seating arrangements: Reserved coach
- Sleeping arrangements: Roomettes and double bedrooms
- Catering facilities: Diner-Counter-Lounge
- Entertainment facilities: Club-Lounge
- Baggage facilities: Checked

Technical
- Rolling stock: EMD E-unit locomotives Streamlined passenger cars by Pullman Standard
- Track gauge: 4 ft 8 1/2 in (1,435 mm)
- Operating speed: 51.2 mph (82 km/h) average (1941); 45.6 mph (73 km/h) average (1971)

The City of Miami was a seven-car coach streamliner inaugurated by Illinois Central Railroad on December 18, 1940. Its route was from Chicago to Miami a total distance of 1,493 miles (2,403 km).

== History ==
The City of Miami was one of three new all-coach streamliners which, together, provided daily service between Chicago and Florida. The other two streamliners were the South Wind and the Dixie Flagler, each of which followed a different route. As with the other routes it was managed by a consortium of train companies, as different engines switched as the coaches and sleepers traveled over different companies' tracks.

The City of Miami was powered by a single EMD E6A 2,000-horsepower (1,500 kW) diesel passenger cab unit. The entire train was painted in an Orange and Palm Green scheme with Scarlet stripes and lettering. Up to and including this new train the Illinois Central seemed to have difficulty deciding on a paint scheme for their streamlined trains. The Green Diamond, Illini, Miss Lou, and now the City of Miami were all painted in their own distinct paint schemes.

Illinois Central was the key player in the City's long run from 1940 to 1971. Immaculately maintained equipment and perfectly matched consists in IC's familiar "Autumn Sunset" chocolate, orange, and yellow were traditional hallmarks of the ever popular Florida streamliner. Indeed, the City was a beautiful sight racing through the countryside between Lake Michigan and Biscayne Bay. During the peak winter season long trains carried several lounges and diners in addition to a sleeper lounge and tavern lounge observation on the rear. Domes were added in 1959. Courier Nurses were replaced by Passenger Service Representatives in later years, but a high standard of service was maintained right up to May 1, 1971, when Amtrak took over and dropped the City of Miami and reinstated the South Wind on the Chicago-Florida route. That year, Amtrak initiated the Floridian on a route largely similar to that of the South Wind.

== Route ==
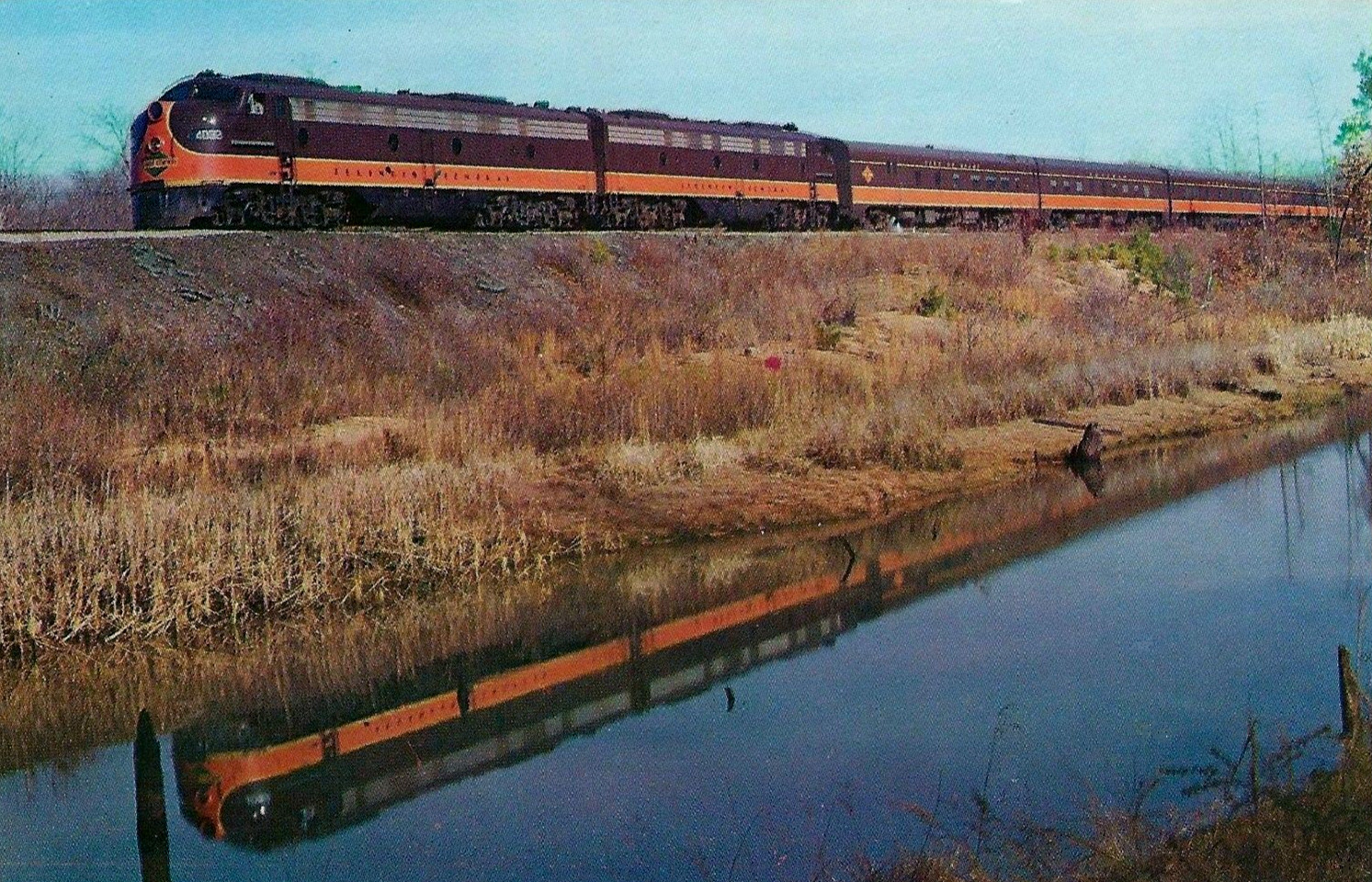
A postcard photograph showing an Illinois Central EMD E8 locomotive pulling the City of Miami (before 1971)

The City of Miami ran from Chicago to Miami by way of Champaign, Centralia, Fulton, Jackson, Birmingham, Columbus, Waycross, and Jacksonville. Between Chicago and Birmingham the streamliner scorched IC rails. Leaving Birmingham the train traversed the Central of Georgia Railway to Albany, Georgia. From Albany to Jacksonville the Atlantic Coast Line Railroad (Seaboard Coast Line Railroad from July 1967) was used. The Florida East Coast Railroad operated the train from Jacksonville to Miami until the FEC strike of 1963. By 1955 the West Coast Champion began hauling thru-cars for the City of Miami and South Wind streamliners to and from Chicago on its Jacksonville-Tampa/Sarasota leg via Orlando and its Jacksonville-St. Petersburg section via Gainesville and Ocala. After the 1963 FEC strike the City of Miami and all ACL Miami-bound trains were rerouted through Orlando via ACL to Auburndale where they crossed over to Seaboard Air Line Railroad (SCL from 1967) rails to reach West Palm Beach and Miami. The SCL continued a section through Gainesville to St. Petersburg and a Sarasota section through Tampa. The St. Petersburg and Miami sections were split and joined at Jacksonville until Amtrak arrived on May 1, 1971.

The only engine change to occur on this route was at Jacksonville where the IC E6A 4000 was exchanged for the FEC's EMC E3 1001 to Miami. The City of Miami was the only one of the three Chicago to Miami lightweight streamlined trains to operate with diesel power over the entire route from the beginning. The City of Miami route was 1,493 miles (2,403 km) and the train made 25 stops en route, only one of which, the Jacksonville stop, was for an engine change. In spite of the number of stops the diesel proved more than capable of maintaining a 50 mph (80 km/h) average. The City of Miami consist was the only one of the three Chicago – Miami lightweight streamlined trains to operate with cars built by Pullman Standard and the only one of the three trains to be diesel powered end terminal to end terminal.

=== Timetable ===
City	Departure time
Chicago, Illinois (Central Station) (Illinois Central) (C.T.)	8:40 a.m.
Chicago, Illinois (53rd Street)	8:47 a.m.
Chicago, Illinois (63rd Street)	8:50 a.m.
Kankakee, Illinois	9:37 a.m.
Champaign–Urbana, Illinois	10:45 a.m.
Mattoon, Illinois	11:22 a.m.
Effingham, Illinois	11:47 a.m.
Centralia, Illinois	12:45 p.m.
Carbondale, Illinois	1:35 p.m.
North Cairo, Illinois	2:45 p.m.
Fulton, Kentucky	3:38 p.m.
Jackson, Tennessee	4:55 p.m.
Corinth, Mississippi	6:03 p.m.
Haleyville, Alabama	7:28 p.m.
Jasper, Alabama	8:50 p.m.
Birmingham, Alabama (Central of Georgia)	10:17 p.m.
Sylacauga, Alabama	11:39 p.m.
Opelika, Alabama	1:06 a.m.
Columbus, Georgia	1:43 a.m.
Albany, Georgia (Atlantic Coast Line)	3:40 a.m.
Waycross, Georgia (E.T.)	7:00 a.m.
Jacksonville, Florida (Florida East Coast)	8:30 a.m.
St. Augustine, Florida	9:15 a.m.
Bunnell, Florida	9:38 a.m.
Daytona Beach, Florida	10:02 a.m.
New Smyrna Beach, Florida	10:25 a.m.
Titusville, Florida	10:54 a.m.
Cocoa-Rockledge, Florida	11:11 a.m.
Melbourne, Florida	11:30 a.m.
Vero Beach, Florida	12:02 p.m.
Fort Pierce, Florida	12:21 p.m.
Stuart, Florida	12:41 p.m.
Hobe Sound, Florida	12:54 p.m.
West Palm Beach, Florida	1:21 p.m.
Lake Worth, Florida	1:33 p.m.
Delray Beach, Florida	1:45 p.m.
Boca Raton, Florida	1:54 p.m.
Pompano, Florida	2:01 p.m.
Fort Lauderdale, Florida	2:12 p.m.
Hollywood, Florida	2:24 p.m.
Miami, Florida	2:50 p.m.
Source: Official Guide of the Railways, June 1941

== Equipment ==
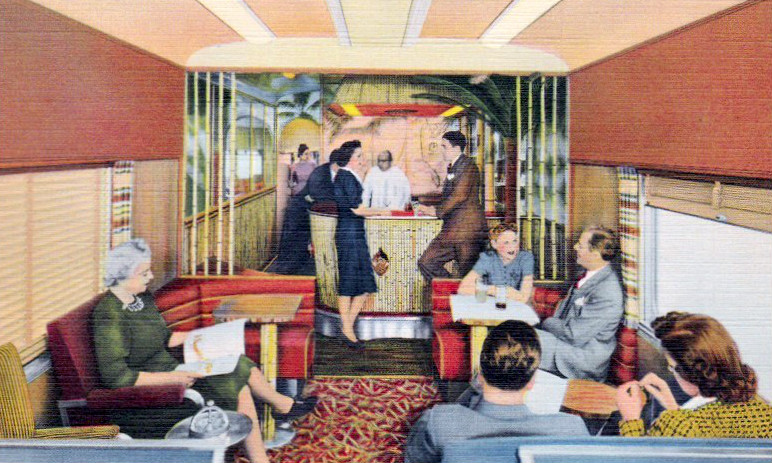
The Bamboo Grove lounge-observation car.

At the outset a single Illinois Central EMD E6 pulled the train for the entire route. Pullman built the initial equipment set of the City of Miami; Budd manufactured the other two sets. The original seven-car set included the following:

- Bougainvillea baggage-dormitory
- Camellia coach with nurse's station
- Japonica coach
- Hibiscus coach
- Poinsettia coach
- Palm Garden dining car
- Bamboo Grove tavern-lounge observation car

Beginning April 23, 1949 the City of Miami added sleeping cars to its consist. These cars were carried forward of the coaches in the City of Miami consist maintaining quick access for coach passengers to the tavern-observation-lounge car on the rear. By 1958 the "colored" coach had been removed from the consist.
