= Du Quoin station =

Du Quoin, IL
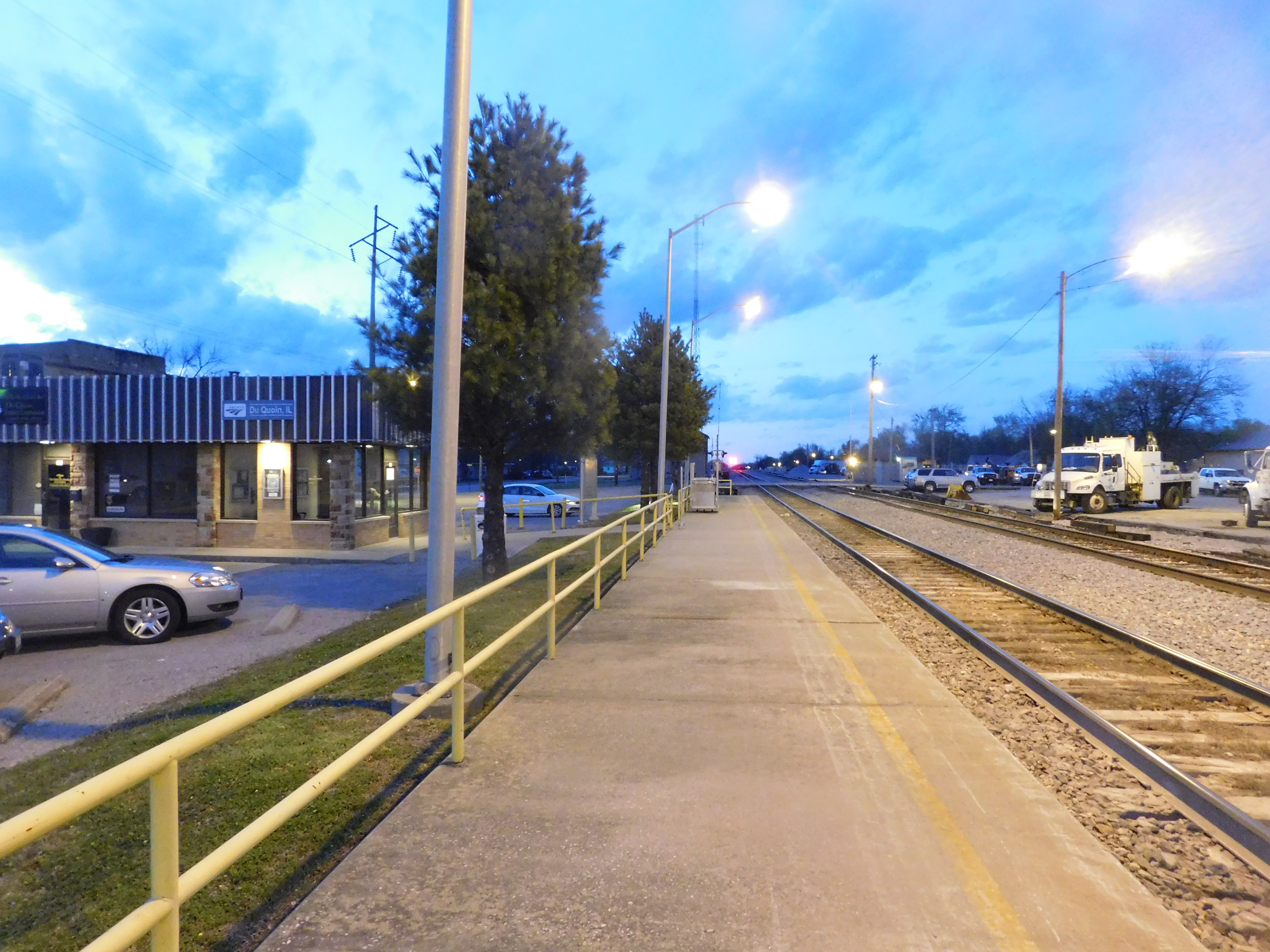
- Du Quoin station in April 2016. The station depot is present on the left.

General information
- Location: 20 North Chestnut Street; Du Quoin, Illinois; United States
- Coordinates: 38.0123°N 89.2404°W
- Owner: City of Du Quoin
- Line: CN Centralia Subdivision
- Platforms: 1 side platform
- Tracks: 2
- Bus operators: South Central Transit

Other information
- Station code: Amtrak: DQN

History
- Opened: August 25, 1989; 36 years ago

Passengers
- FY 2025: 6,909 (Amtrak)

Services
Preceding station	Amtrak	Following station
Carbondale Terminus	Illini and Saluki	Centralia toward Chicago
City of New Orleans does not stop here
Former services
Preceding station	Illinois Central Railroad	Following station
Dowell toward New Orleans	Main Line	St. Johns toward Chicago
Denny toward St. Louis	St. Louis – Carbondale	Carbondale Terminus
Preceding station	Amtrak	Following station
Carbondale toward New Orleans	River Cities	Centralia toward Kansas City
Location

Du Quoin station is an Amtrak intercity train station in Du Quoin, Illinois, United States, on the Illini and Saluki routes. The City of New Orleans route also passes by this station, but does not stop here. It was built in 1989 by the city of Du Quoin, with assistance from the Illinois Department of Transportation.

The former Du Quoin station for the Illinois Central Railroad, built in 1901, burned on June 29, 1971 after being slated for demolition.
