= Mattoon station =

Amtrak intercity train station in Mattoon, Illinois

Mattoon, IL
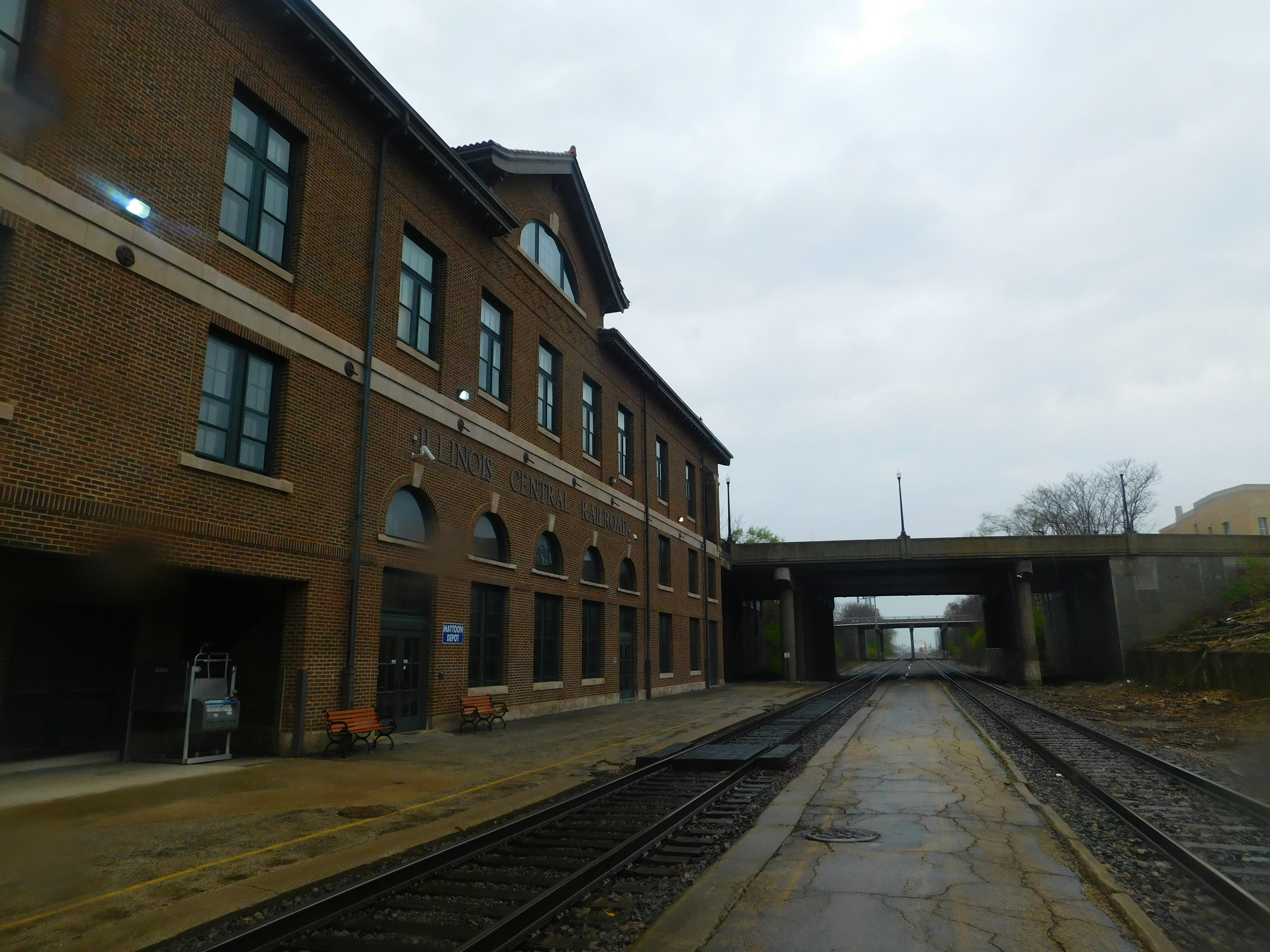
- The Mattoon station platform in April 2016. The depot constructed by the Illinois Central Railroad is on the left.

General information
- Location: 1718 Broadway Avenue; Mattoon, Illinois; United States
- Coordinates: 39.4829°N 88.3760°W
- Line: CN Champaign Subdivision
- Platforms: 1 side platform, 1 island platform
- Tracks: 2
- Connections: Coles County Zipline

Other information
- Status: Regular stop (Illini/Saluki); Flag stop (City of New Orleans)
- Station code: Amtrak: MAT

History
- Opened: 1855
- Rebuilt: 1860; March 1917–January 21, 1918

Key dates
- December 1977: Station agent eliminated

Passengers
- FY 2025: 34,319 (Amtrak)

Services
Preceding station	Amtrak	Following station
Effingham toward New Orleans	City of New Orleans	Champaign–Urbana toward Chicago
Effingham toward Carbondale	Illini and Saluki	Champaign–Urbana toward Chicago
Former services
Preceding station	Illinois Central Railroad	Following station
Aetna toward New Orleans	Main Line	Dorans toward Chicago
Coles toward Peoria	Peoria – Evansville	Newby toward Evansville
- Illinois Central Railroad Depot
- U.S. National Register of Historic Places
- Interactive map of Illinois Central Railroad Depot
- Built: 1918
- NRHP reference No.: 02000098
- Added to NRHP: March 1, 2002
Location

Mattoon station is an Amtrak intercity train station in Mattoon, Illinois, United States. The station is a flag stop on the City of New Orleans route, served only when passengers have tickets to and from the station. It is a regular stop for the Illini and Saluki.

== History ==
The Mattoon station is housed in the former Illinois Central Railroad Depot. The depot was completed in 1918 and placed on the National Register of Historic Places in 2001. At its height, the building housed a power plant, mail room, luggage room, and restaurant, in addition to the main hall where passengers waited to board trains. As many as ten trains a day departed the depot in the 1950s.

During 2010, a $3 million restoration project, paid for from a mix of private, state, and federal funding, was undertaken, replacing paint, flooring, and other interior fixtures.

== The depot today ==
There are no Amtrak employees at the station; the doors unlock and lock automatically before and after the arrival and departure of trains. The station currently serves as a stop for the Illini, Saluki, and City of New Orleans passenger trains The tracks themselves, formerly part of the Illinois Central Railroad, are now owned by the Canadian National Railway (CN). Freight trains run by CN pass through frequently.

Transit service to the depot from Mattoon and Charleston is provided by Dial-A-Ride Rural Public Transportation, which provides deviated fixed-route and demand-response service.
