= DQN =

DQN could refer to:

- Du Quoin station, Amtrak station code DQN
- Station code for Dhanera station, Gujarat, India - see List of railway stations in India
- Deep Q-Network, used in Deep Q-learning
- An internet slang used as derogatory name in Japan. - see DQN (internet slang)
