= Effingham station =

Amtrak intercity train station in Effingham, Illinois

Effingham, IL
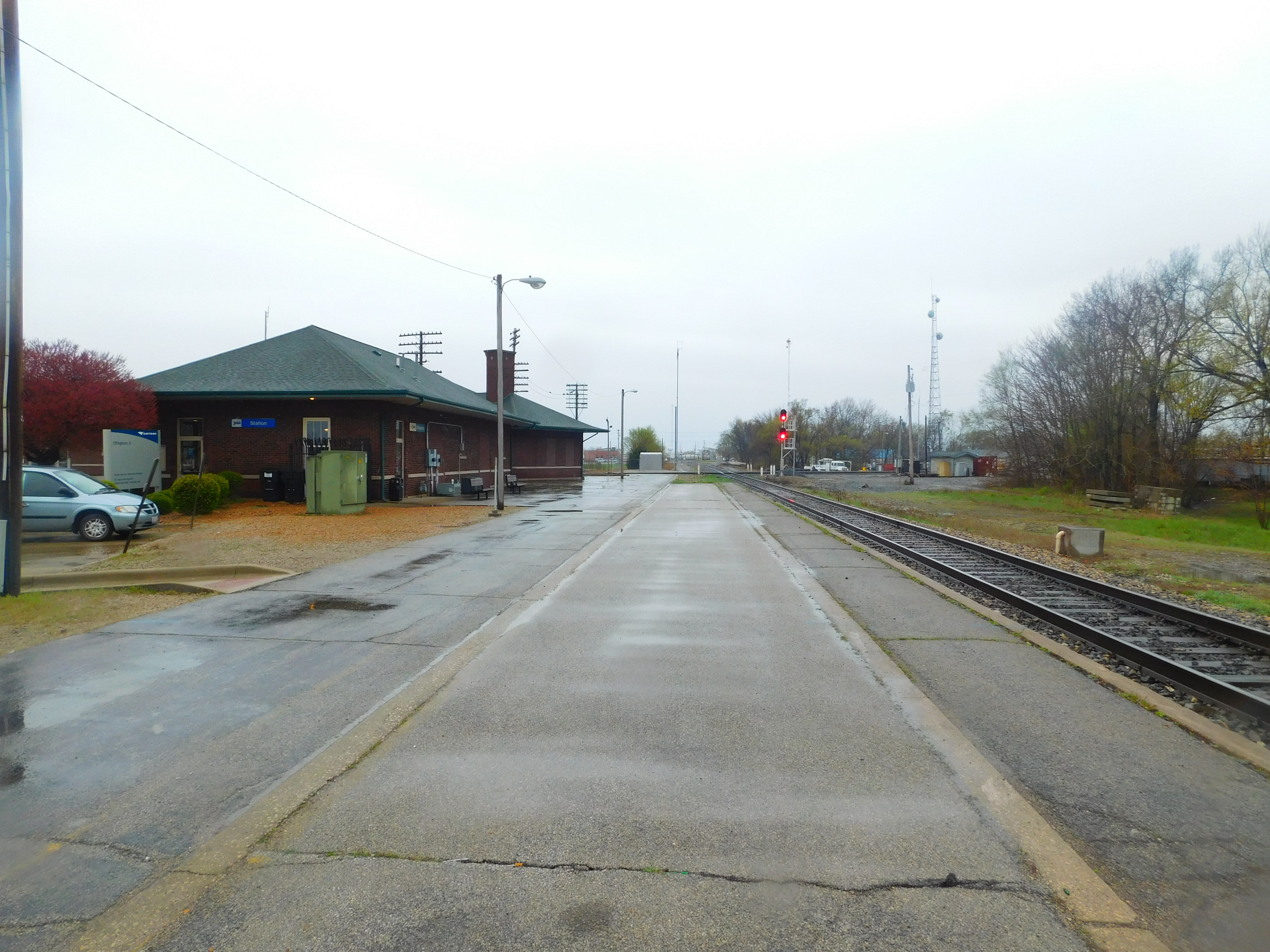
- Effingham station in April 2016.

General information
- Location: 401 West National Avenue; Effingham, Illinois; United States
- Coordinates: 39.1170°N 88.5472°W
- Line: CN Champaign Subdivision
- Platforms: 1 side platform
- Tracks: 1

Other information
- Status: Regular stop (Illini/Saluki); Flag stop (City of New Orleans)
- Station code: Amtrak: EFG

Passengers
- FY 2025: 22,775 (Amtrak)

Services
Preceding station	Amtrak	Following station
Centralia toward New Orleans	City of New Orleans	Mattoon toward Chicago
Centralia toward Carbondale	Illini and Saluki	Mattoon toward Chicago
Former services
Preceding station	Amtrak	Following station
St. Louis–Union Station toward Kansas City	National Limited	Terre Haute toward New York or Washington, D.C.
Preceding station	Illinois Central Railroad	Following station
Watson toward New Orleans	Main Line	Sigel toward Chicago
Terminus	Effingham – Indianapolis	Dieterich toward Indianapolis
Preceding station	Pennsylvania Railroad	Following station
Funkhouser toward St. Louis	St. Louis – Pittsburgh	Teutopolis toward Pittsburgh
Location

Effingham station is an Amtrak intercity train station in Effingham, Illinois, United States. The station contains three houses, at the CSXT St. Louis Line Subdivision (ex-Pennsylvania Railroad) crossing that once served Amtrak's former National Limited line between Kansas City and either Washington D.C. or New York City until 1979. The station is a flag stop on the City of New Orleans route, served only when passengers have tickets to and from the station; the Illini and Saluki also stops here.

== See Also ==
- Durand Union Station: another Amtrak station with similar layout
