= Illini and Saluki =

Amtrak services between Chicago, IL and Carbondale, IL

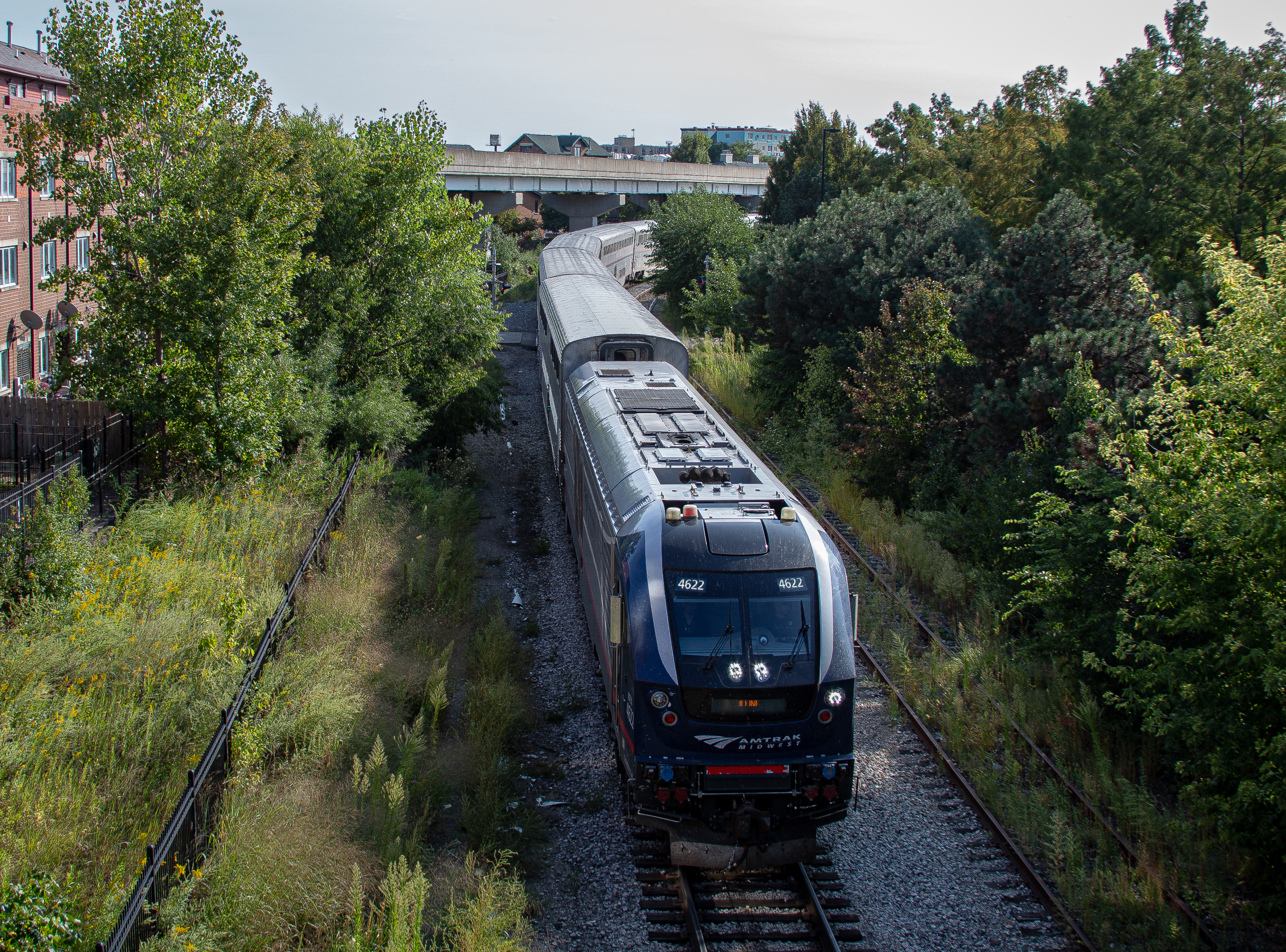
- The Illini in Chicago in 2024

Overview
- Service type: Inter-city rail
- Status: Active
- Locale: Illinois
- First service: December 19, 1973 (Illini); October 30, 2006 (Saluki)
- Current operator: Amtrak
- Annual ridership: 319,114 (FY 25) ▲7.6% (Note: Amtrak's Fiscal Year (FY) runs from October 1 of the prior year to September 30 of the named year.)

Route
- Termini: Chicago; Carbondale
- Stops: 9
- Distance travelled: 310 miles (500 km)
- Average journey time: 5 hours, 30 minutes
- Service frequency: 2 daily round trips
- Train number: 390–393

On-board services
- Classes: Coach Class; Business Class
- Disabled access: Train lower level, most stations
- Catering facilities: Café
- Baggage facilities: Overhead racks

Technical
- Rolling stock: Superliner
- Track gauge: 4 ft 8 1/2 in (1,435 mm) standard gauge
- Operating speed: 56 mph (90 km/h) (avg.); 79 mph (127 km/h) (top)
- Track owner: CN

The Illini and Saluki are a pair of passenger trains operated by Amtrak along a 310-mile (500 km) route between Chicago and Carbondale, Illinois. They are part of Amtrak's Illinois Service and are primarily funded by the state of Illinois. The service provides two daily roundtrips, Saluki being the morning trains and Illini the afternoon trains. The route is coextensive with the far northern leg of the long-distance City of New Orleans.

The Illini has operated since 1973; a previous version operated in 1971–1972 between Chicago and Champaign. The Saluki debuted in 2006. In fiscal year 2023, the Illini and Saluki carried a combined 270,017 passengers, a 20.4% increase from FY2022.

== History ==
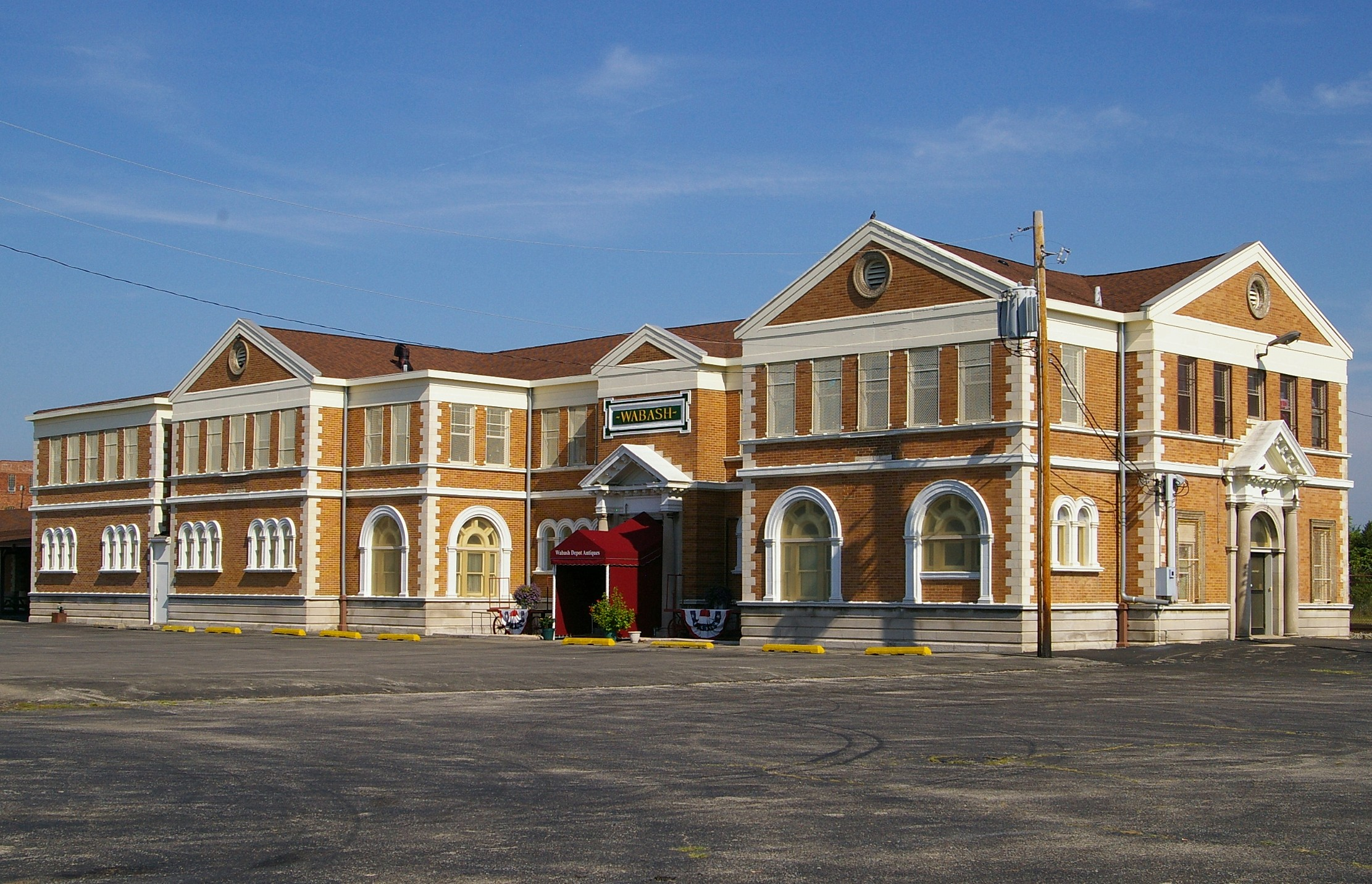
The Wabash station in Decatur, once served by the Illini.

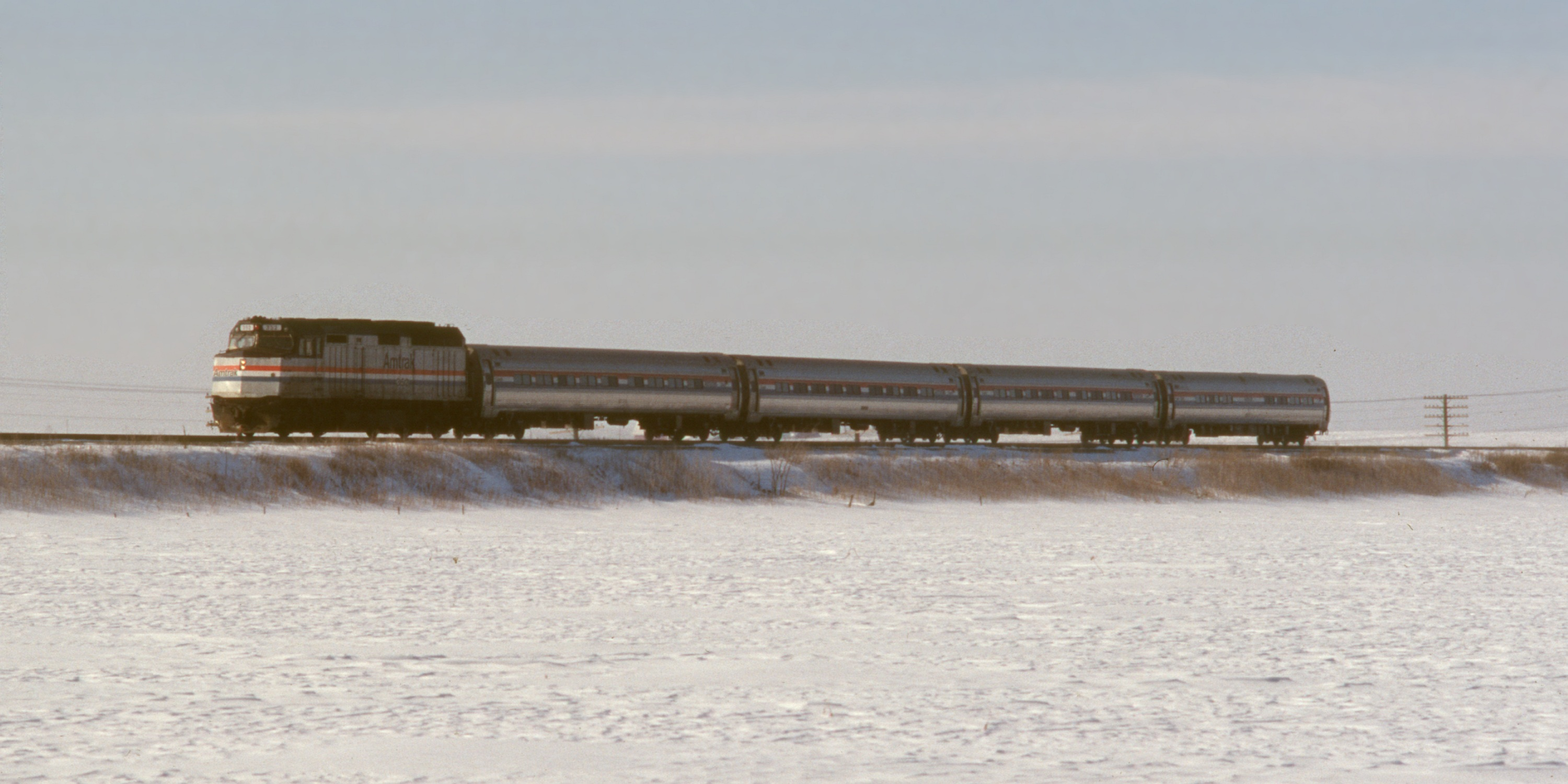
The Illini in Gilman in 1989

The Illinois Central Railroad's main line between Chicago and New Orleans ran through Champaign–Urbana and Carbondale, along the east side of Illinois. At the formation of Amtrak in 1971, the Illinois Central still operated a number of services from its Central Station in Chicago over this route, including the Illini and Shawnee (Chicago-Carbondale), the City of New Orleans and the Panama Limited (both, Chicago–New Orleans), plus the City of Miami (Chicago–Birmingham).

Amtrak retained two trains on this route: the City of New Orleans (which it named the Panama Limited) and the Shawnee. Amtrak brought back the Illini name on November 14, 1971, as a Chicago-Champaign train, operating in conjunction with the Campus. It was named for the Illini, from which the state of Illinois and the Fighting Illini mascot of the University of Illinois Urbana–Champaign get their names. Amtrak discontinued the Campus and Illini on March 5, 1972. Both trains used Central Station, which Amtrak was abandoning; Amtrak judged that the additional 35–40 minutes necessary to serve Union Station made the schedule impractical. The 1972 Illini made its last trip on March 3.

Amtrak revived the Illini on December 19, 1973, again as a Chicago–Champaign service. The restoration was part of $1.5 million expansion program which included the Black Hawk (Chicago–Rockford–Dubuque), the State House (St. Louis–Chicago), and supplemental funding for the Rock Island's two remaining Rockets (Chicago–Peoria and Chicago–Rock Island). The state desired to extend the Illini to Decatur, but doing so involved a switch from the Illinois Central to the Norfolk & Western at Tolono, south of Champaign. The connection between the lines was in poor condition, and no one would take responsibility for repairing it.

Amtrak finally extended the Illini to Decatur on July 2, 1981. Decatur had last seen service in 1971 from the Norfolk & Western's City of Decatur (Chicago–Decatur) and the Wabash's Wabash Cannon Ball (Detroit–St. Louis). Neither train had been retained by Amtrak. The new Amtrak service used the old Wabash station, which as of 2010 still stands and has become an antique store. Poor ridership prompted Illinois to withdraw its support for the Decatur stop, and Amtrak cut the Illini back to Champaign on July 10, 1983.

On January 12, 1986, Amtrak extended the Illini to Carbondale to replace the Shawnee, which had been canceled because of budget cuts. Service began at Gilman on October 26, 1986, and Du Quoin on August 25, 1989. The Illini service was nearly canceled in 1996, but local communities along the route pledged funds to keep it running.

A second train, the Saluki, was added on October 30, 2006, in response to increased demand on the Illini and other Illinois Service trains in the 2005–2006 fiscal year. The Saluki was named for the mascot of Southern Illinois University, which is located in the train's southern terminus of Carbondale. Its morning schedule complements the afternoon schedule of the Illini.

Amtrak ran an extra over the route, the Eclipse Express, for the solar eclipse of August 21, 2017.

== Equipment ==
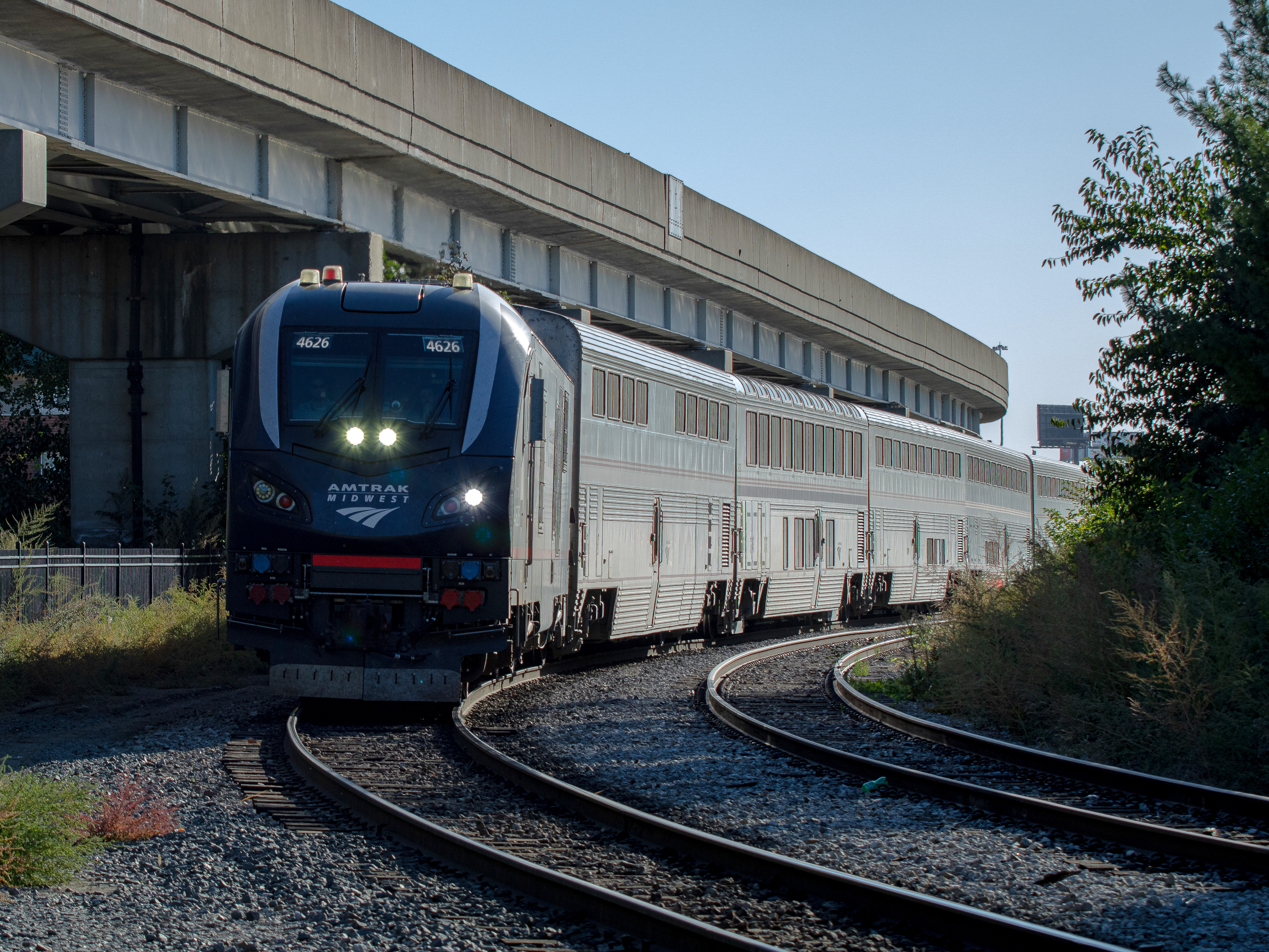
A typical Illini in 2024

A typical Illini or Saluki consists of one Siemens Charger or a GE P42DC locomotive and seven Superliner coaches.

Since the early 2010s, CN has required that Amtrak trains on the Chicago–Carbondale route have 32 axles (one locomotive and seven passenger cars) in order to properly trigger grade crossing detection devices on the route. Trains typically had several Amfleet or Horizon Fleet passenger cars; unoccupied Heritage Fleet dining cars and baggage cars, then later Viewliner II baggage cars, were used to meet the axle count. In 2020, CN began requiring Amtrak to use trains with seven bilevel Superliner cars, rather than lighter single-level equipment. This meant that 14 Superliners required for the Illini and Saluki could not be used for long-distance trains.

In October 2024, Amtrak was awarded a $59 million federal grant to install shunt enhancer devices on its locomotives and cab cars to remove this requirement. When completed, this will allow single-level equipment to again be assigned to the route, freeing up the Superliners for other trains.

== Route ==
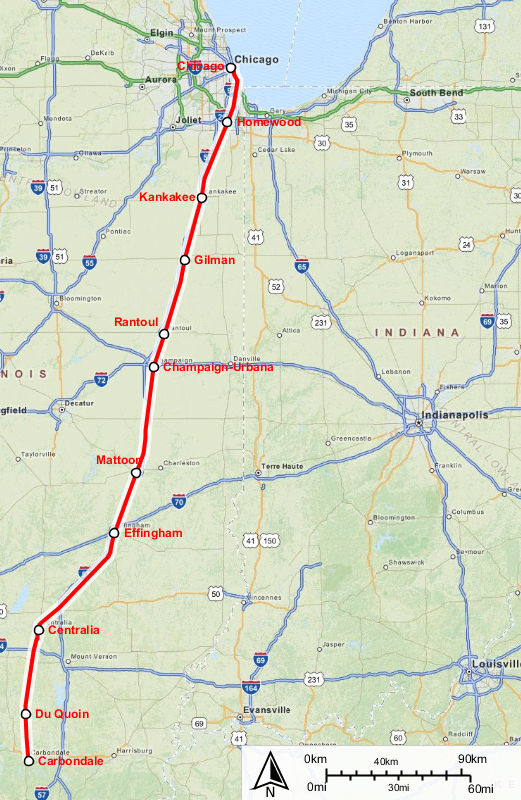
Route of the Illini and Saluki

The Illini and Saluki operates over the Canadian National Railway, successor to the Illinois Central. The route is 309 miles (497 km) long.

The Chicago Region Environmental and Transportation Efficiency Program (CREATE) is in the preliminary design phase for the Grand Crossing Project. This project will reroute the Illini, Saluki, and City of New Orleans trains from Canadian National Railway's tracks to Norfolk Southern's Chicago Line in the Greater Grand Crossing neighborhood in Chicago. This will eliminate a time-consuming switchback on the St. Charles Air Line into Chicago Union Station.

The trains have stops near three major Illinois state universities: University of Illinois Urbana-Champaign, Southern Illinois University, and Eastern Illinois University in Charleston (near Mattoon). As a result, university students account for a significant portion of passengers.

=== Station Stops ===
The entire route is in the U.S. state of Illinois.

City	Station	Connections
Chicago	Chicago Union Station	Amtrak (long-distance): California Zephyr, Cardinal, City of New Orleans, Empire Builder, Floridian, Lake Shore Limited, Southwest Chief, Texas Eagle; Amtrak (intercity): Blue Water, Borealis, Hiawatha, Illinois Zephyr & Carl Sandburg, Lincoln Service, Pere Marquette, Wolverine; Metra: BNSF, Heritage Corridor, Milwaukee District North, Milwaukee District West, North Central Service, SouthWest Service; Chicago "L": Blue (at Clinton) Brown Orange Pink Purple (at Quincy); Local buses: CTA, Pace; Intercity buses: Amtrak Thruway, Greyhound, Megabus, Peoria Charter
Homewood	Homewood	Metra: Metra Electric; Amtrak: City of New Orleans; Pace
Kankakee	Kankakee	Amtrak: City of New Orleans
Gilman	Gilman	
Rantoul	Rantoul	
Champaign-Urbana	Illinois Terminal	Champaign–Urbana Mass Transit District; Amtrak: City of New Orleans; Burlington Trailways; Greyhound Lines; Peoria Charter
Mattoon	Mattoon	Amtrak: City of New Orleans; Greyhound Lines
Effingham	Effingham	Amtrak: City of New Orleans
Centralia	Centralia	Amtrak: City of New Orleans
Du Quoin	Du Quoin	
Carbondale	Southern Illinois Multimodal Station	JAX Mass Transit; Amtrak: City of New Orleans; Amtrak Thruway; Greyhound Lines
