= Centralia station (Illinois) =

Amtrak intercity train station in Centralia, Illinois

Centralia, IL
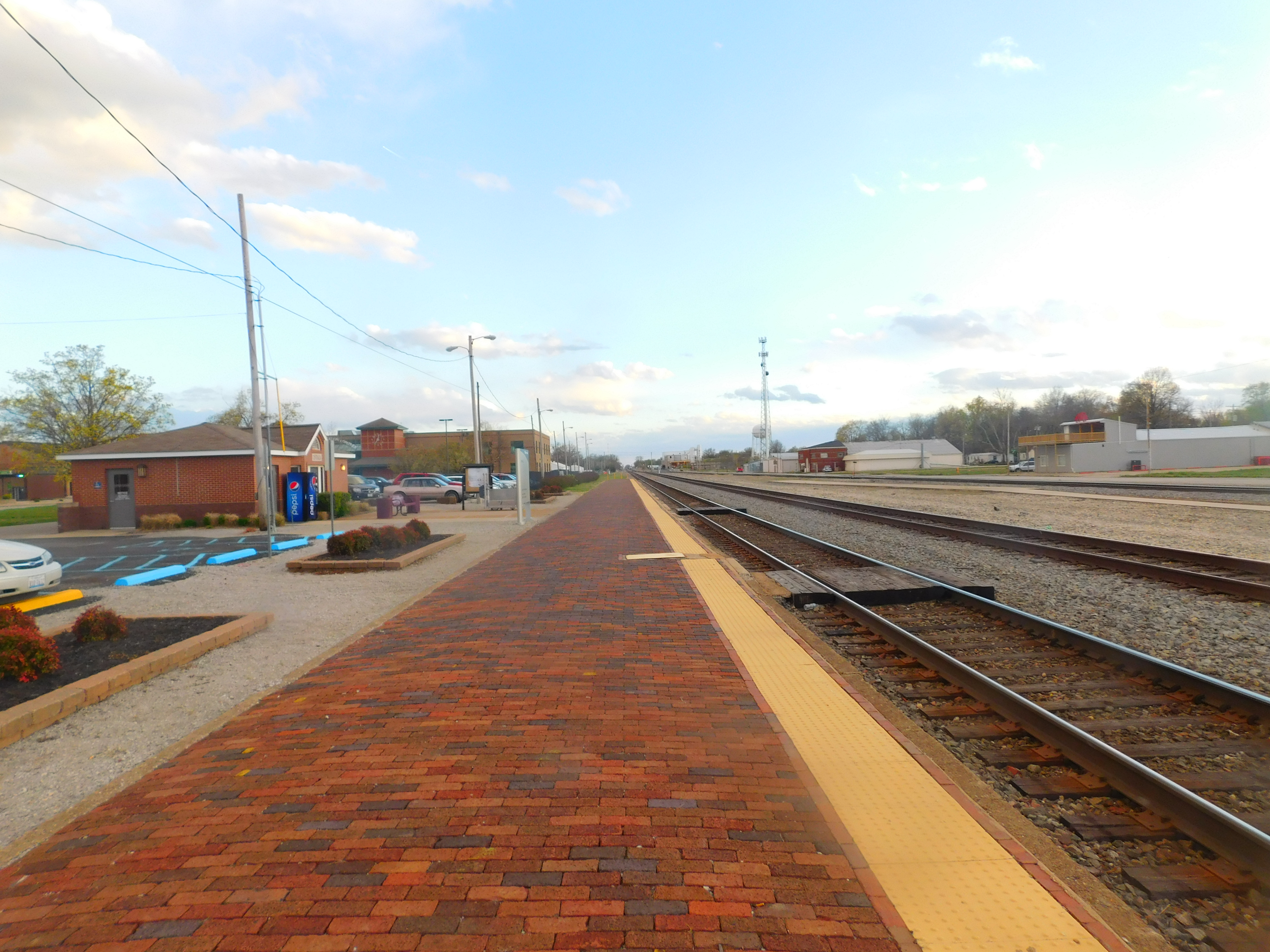
- Centralia station in April 2016.

General information
- Location: 108 East Broadway; Centralia, Illinois; United States
- Coordinates: 38.5274°N 89.1361°W
- Owner: City of Centralia
- Line: CN Centralia Subdivision
- Platforms: 1 side platform
- Tracks: 2
- Bus operators: South Central Transit

Construction
- Parking: Yes

Other information
- Status: Regular stop (Illini/Saluki); Flag stop (City of New Orleans)
- Station code: Amtrak: CEN

Passengers
- FY 2025: 17,638 (Amtrak)

Services
| Preceding station | Amtrak | Following station |
|---|---|---|
| Carbondale toward New Orleans | City of New Orleans | Effingham toward Chicago |
| Du Quoin toward Carbondale | Illini and Saluki | Effingham toward Chicago |
Former services
| Preceding station | Illinois Central Railroad | Following station |
|---|---|---|
| Irvington toward New Orleans | Main Line | Central City toward Chicago |
| Sandoval toward Freeport | Freeport – Centralia | Terminus |
| Preceding station | Amtrak | Following station |
| Du Quoin toward New Orleans | River Cities | Belleville toward Kansas City |
Location

Centralia station is an Amtrak intercity train station in Centralia, Illinois, United States. The station existed as little more than a sheltered platform until an unstaffed waiting area was built in 2003. The new $100,611 station was funded by the city, the Centralia Foundation, the Centralia Area Development Association and the Great American Stations Foundation. The station is a flag stop on the City of New Orleans route, served only when passengers have tickets to and from the station. It is a regular stop on the Illini and Saluki.
