= Carbondale station =

Railway station in Carbondale, Illinois, U.S.

Carbondale, IL
- 2025-built station building in June 2025.

General information
- Location: 401 South Illinois Street; Carbondale, Illinois; United States
- Coordinates: 37.7243°N 89.2165°W
- Owner: Illinois Central Railroad (Canadian National Railway)
- Line: CN Centralia Subdivision
- Platforms: 1 side platform
- Tracks: 2
- Bus operators: JAX Mass Transit; Rides Mass Transit District; South Central Transit
- Connections: Amtrak Thruway

Construction
- Parking: Yes
- Cycle facilities: Yes
- Accessible: Yes

Other information
- Station code: Amtrak: CDL

History
- Opened: July 4, 1854; 172 years ago
- Rebuilt: 1903; 123 years ago; 1981; 45 years ago; 2025; 1 year ago

Passengers
- FY 2025: 82,122 (Amtrak)

Services
Preceding station	Amtrak	Following station
Fulton toward New Orleans	City of New Orleans	Centralia toward Chicago
Terminus	Illini and Saluki	Du Quoin toward Chicago
Former services
Preceding station	Illinois Central Railroad	Following station
Makanda toward New Orleans	Main Line	DeSoto toward Chicago
Murphysboro toward St. Louis	St. Louis – Carbondale	Terminus
Du Quoin Via Du Quoin toward St. Louis	St. Louis – Carbondale	Terminus
Texas toward Gale	Gale – Carbondale	Terminus
Location

Carbondale Station (officially known as the Southern Illinois Multimodal Station or SIMMS for short) is an Amtrak intercity train station in Carbondale, Illinois, United States. The southern terminus of Amtrak's Illini and Saluki routes, it is also served by the City of New Orleans. Amtrak Thruway service between Carbondale and St. Louis, Missouri connects with the City of New Orleans. Carbondale is the southernmost Amtrak station in Illinois.

== History ==
=== First station building ===
Illinois Central Railroad (IC) service to Carbondale began on July 4, 1854, with a wooden passenger depot.

=== Second station building ===
NRHP information on second station building
- - Illinois Central Railroad Passenger Depot
  - U.S. National Register of Historic Places
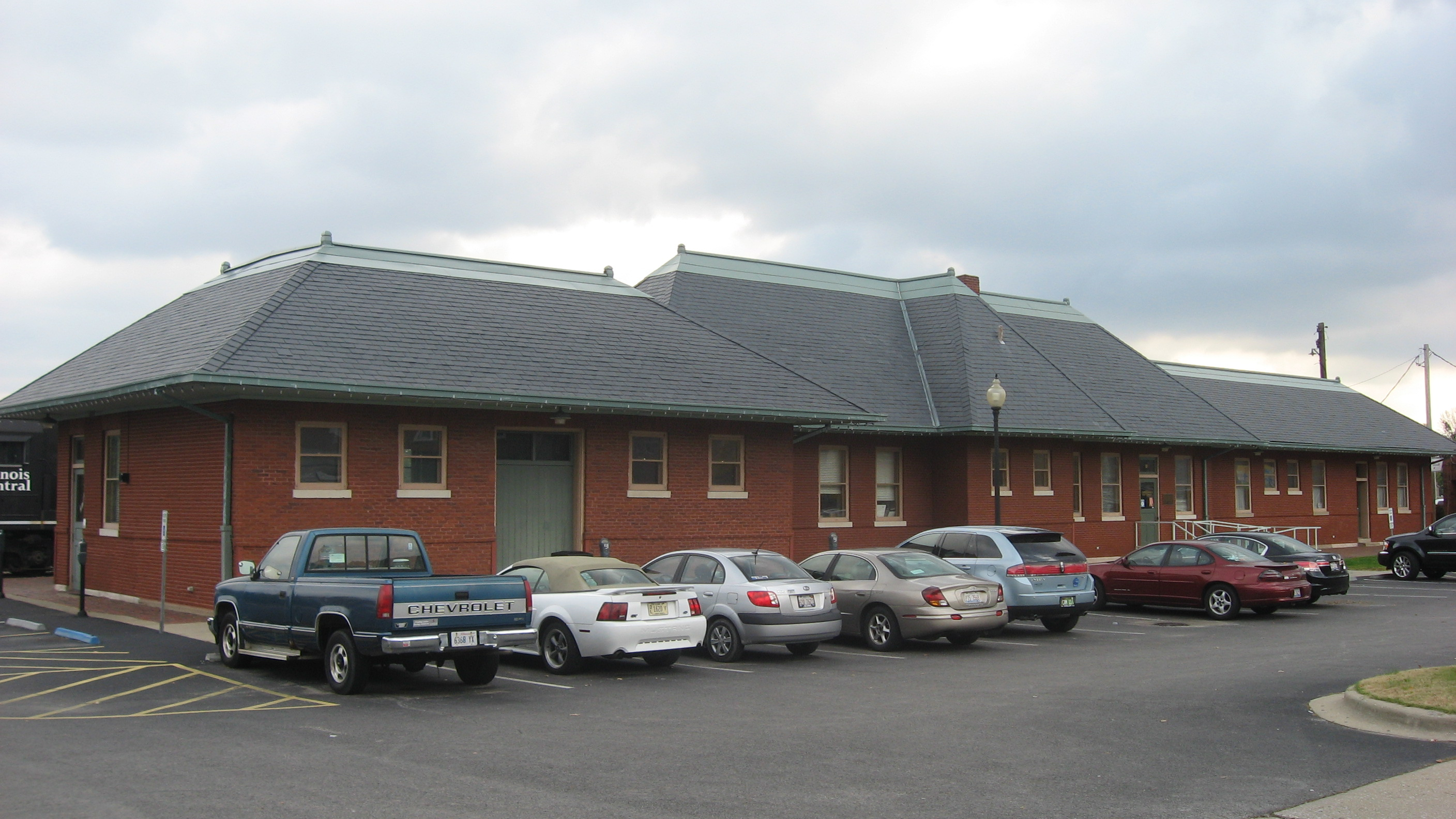
  - Location within Illinois Location within the United States
  - Location: 111 S. Illinois Avenue, Carbondale, Illinois
  - Area: less than one acre
  - Built: 1903
  - Architect: Bacon, Francis T.
  - NRHP reference No.: 02000457
  - Added to NRHP: May 9, 2002

A new station building was built in 1903 as part of a series of improvements by the railroad in Carbondale, which included a roundhouse, office buildings, and a bandstand and park. Railway architect Francis T. Bacon designed the brick and limestone station.

The city of Carbondale purchased the former station from the IC in 1989; the exterior was restored in 1992, followed by the interior in 1996. The depot was added to the National Register of Historic Places on May 9, 2002 as the Illinois Central Railroad Passenger Depot. The building now houses the offices of Carbondale Main Street and Carbondale Chamber of Commerce.

=== Third station building ===
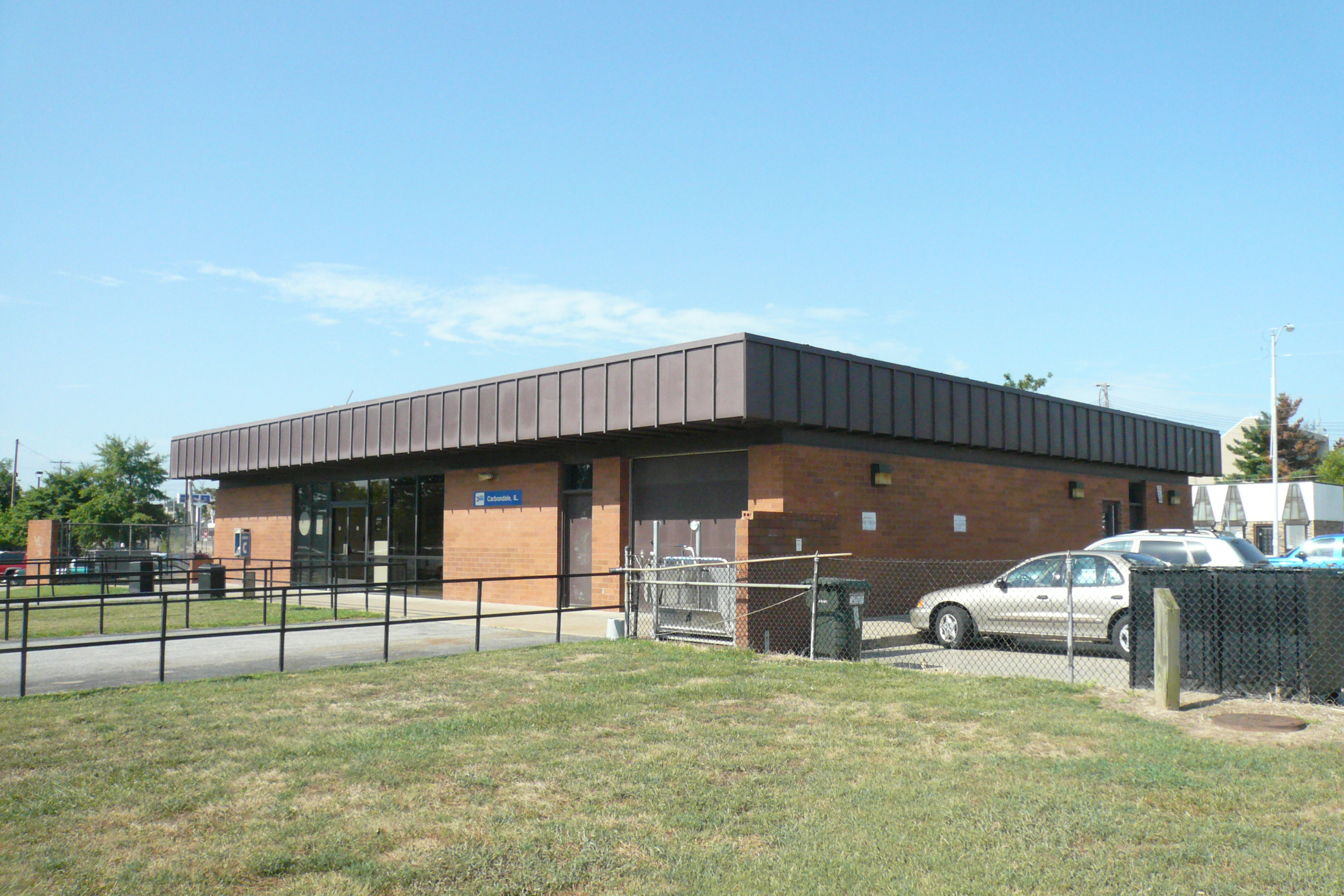
Third station, photographed in 2010

Amtrak took over intercity passenger service from most private railroads, including the IC, on May 1, 1971. Initial Amtrak service to Carbondale was by the Chicago-New Orleans City of New Orleans (renamed Panama Limited that November) and Chicago-Carbondale Shawnee, each with one daily round trip. The City of New Orleans name returned in 1981. That year, Amtrak constructed a new station some 800 feet (240 m) to the south. The current station shares characteristics with the standard designs of the Amtrak Standard Stations Program.

The Shawnee was merged with the Chicago-Champaign Illini on January 12, 1986; the Illini name was preserved with its terminus extended to Carbondale. A second daily Illini round trip, the Saluki, was added on October 30, 2006. The Saluki was named for the mascot of Southern Illinois University in Carbondale.

The 1981 station was demolished in 2025.

== Southern Illinois Multimodal Station ==
In November 2019, the city was awarded a $14 million federal grant to construct the Southern Illinois Multimodal Station (SIMMS), which will replace the 1981-built station with a large train and bus depot on the same site. As of March 2022, it was claimed that 60% of the construction documents for the project had been completed, as had most approvals needed to construct a new facility (including approval by the Illinois Department of Transportation). On March 22, 2022, it was also decided by the Carbondale City Council to name the new station the "Southern Illinois Multimodal Station".

Early on, plans had called for a two-story structure, with the second floor being home to space for a work program. The work program space was moved to the first floor in design revisions which saw the plans change to a one story structure.

The station building has its main entrance at its southwest corner, accented by a structural tower. There is a south entrance for easy access from the parking lot, and a west entrance fronting Illinois Avenue. There is also a further entrance at the center of the building's west face, along Illinois Avenue. Features of the station include a ticket desk and a baggage claim area. Per Amtrak's request, the station design also included a small fenced-in dog walking area near the train tracks for the convenience of those traveling on Amtrak with their pet dogs. The south side of the new facility is designated to be the location for mass transit bus services. The northern side of the building is to be occupied by offices for the Carbondale Chamber of Commerce, Carbondale Main Street, and a work program. The new station building is also to be home to Southern Illinois University's welcome center and the offices of the Carbondale Tourism agency. The new station building has been designed with an aim of achieving LEED Silver certification.

The station building has a design featuring terrazzo flooring in its station areas, including a compass motif in the building's western vestibule and a two-dimensional representation of a geodesic dome at the southwest entrance as a tribute to the work of famous onetime Carbondale resident Buckminster Fuller. As a further tribute to Fuller, the eastern interior wall of the station facility was designed to be adorned with Fuller's quote, "... to make the world work for 100% of humanity in the shortest possible time, through spontaneous cooperation, without ecological offences or disadvantage of anyone." The station is also intended to include displays related to Fuller provided by the R. Buckminster Fuller Dome Not-For-Profit, including photographs, paintings, and artifacts.

Amtrak service began at SIMMS on May 20, 2025.
