= Fulton station =

Amtrak flag stop in Kentucky

Fulton, KY
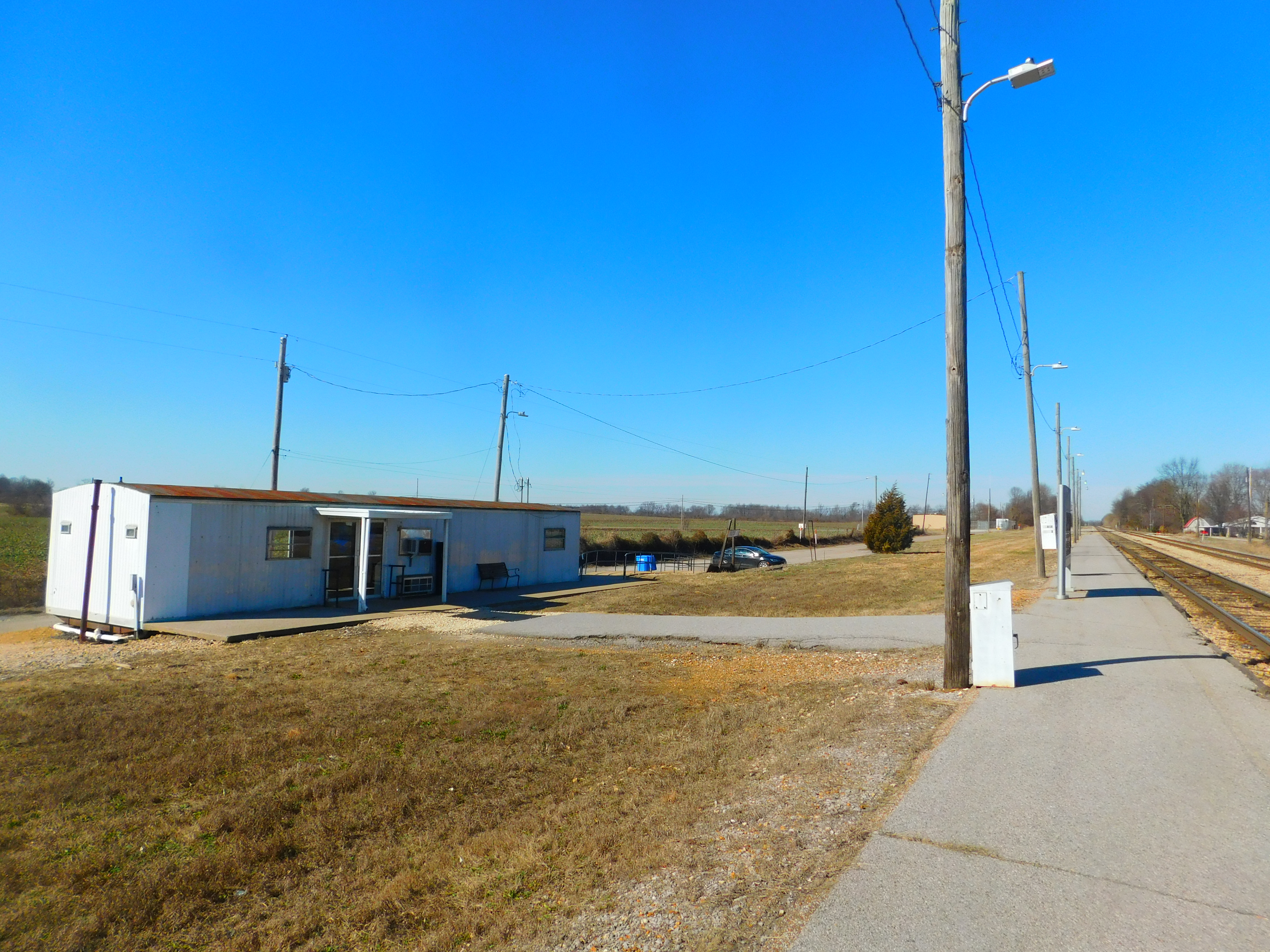
- The Fulton station in January 2017. The trailer that serves as the depot is visible on the left.

General information
- Location: 21 Newton Road; Fulton, Kentucky; United States
- Coordinates: 36°31′25″N 88°53′14″W
- Line: CN Illinois Central
- Platforms: 1 short side platform
- Tracks: 2
- Connections: Fulton County Transit Authority

Construction
- Structure type: Building with waiting room
- Parking: 12 long and 5 short term

Other information
- Status: Flag stop; unstaffed
- Station code: Amtrak: FTN

History
- Opened: July 25, 1977

Passengers
- FY 2025: 4,547 (Amtrak)

Services
Preceding station	Amtrak	Following station
Newbern toward New Orleans	City of New Orleans	Carbondale toward Chicago
Former services
Preceding station	Illinois Central Railroad	Following station
Pierce toward New Orleans	Main Line	Crutchfield toward Chicago
Terminus	Fulton – Edgewood	Dukes toward Edgewood
Gibbs toward Memphis	Memphis – Louisville	Water Valley toward Louisville
McConnell toward Grenada	Grenada – Fulton	Terminus
Location

Fulton station is an Amtrak intercity train station in Fulton, Kentucky, near the Purchase Parkway and Highway 51. The station is a flag stop on the City of New Orleans route, served only when passengers have tickets to and from the station.

This is an unstaffed station; there is no agent and no assistance. The previous station house was torn down by the Illinois Central Gulf Railroad in 1979. Fulton County Transit Authority provides demand-response service from Fulton station to neighboring counties.

The tracks used were once part of the Illinois Central Railroad system, and are now owned by the Canadian National Railway.
