= Whittington, Illinois =

- Unincorporated community
- Location within Illinois Location within the United States
- Coordinates: 38°05′21″N 88°54′10″W
- Country: United States
- State: Illinois
- County: Franklin
- Township: Ewing
- Elevation: 443 ft (135 m)
- Time zone: UTC-6 (Central (CST))
  - Summer (DST): UTC-5 (CDT)
- ZIP code: 62897
- Area code: 618
- GNIS feature ID: 421122
- Public Transit: South Central Transit

Whittington is an unincorporated community in Franklin County, Illinois, United States. Whittington is located near the eastern shore of Rend Lake and Exit 77 of Interstate 57. It is the site of the headquarters of Wayne Fitzgerrell State Recreation Area. Whittington has a post office with ZIP code 62897.
