= South Central Illinois Mass Transit District =

Provider of mass transportation in South Central Illinois

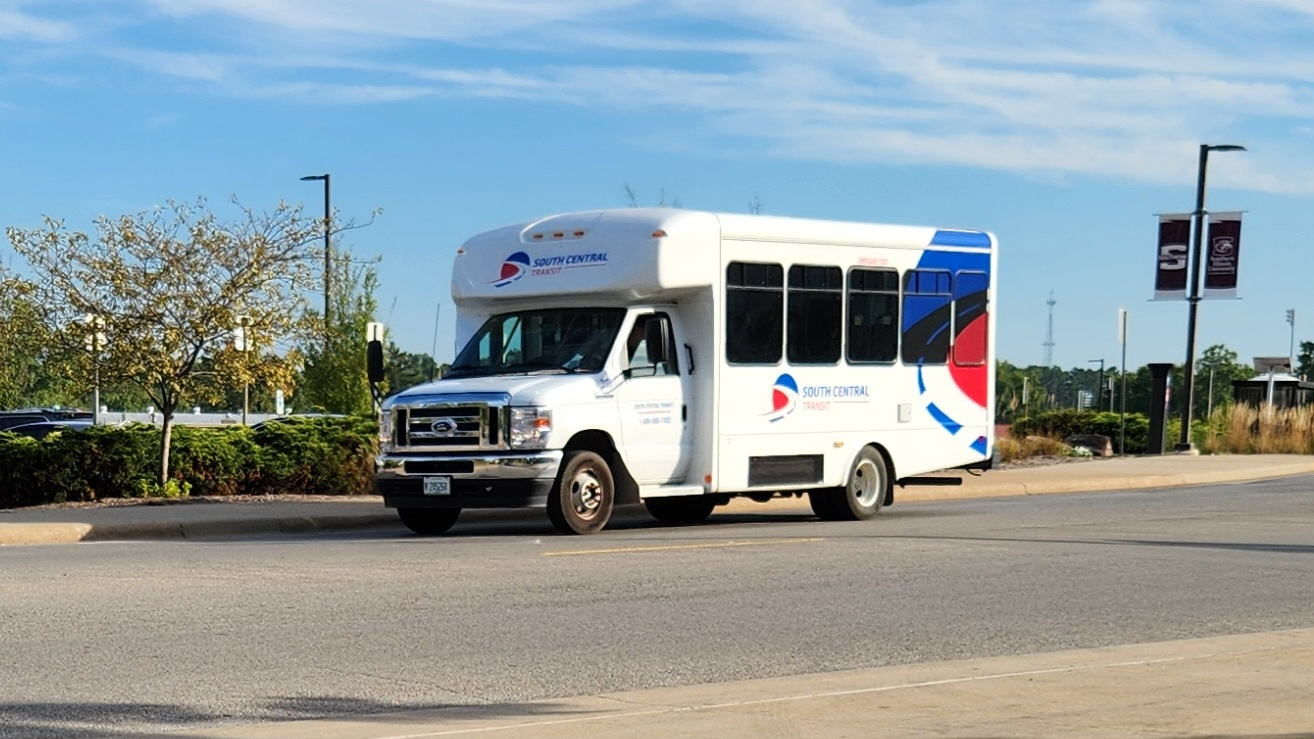
- A South Central Transit Bus in October 2025
- Headquarters: 1616 East McCord St, Centralia, Illinois
- Locale: Benton, Centralia, Du Quoin, Mt. Vernon, Pinckneyville, West Frankfort
- Service area: Clinton, Franklin, Jefferson, Marion, Perry and Washington counties in Illinois
- Service type: Bus service and demand-response service
- Routes: 18
- Hubs: Benton Walmart; Centralia SCT Transportation Center; Du Quoin Bus Shelter; Du Quoin Park & Ride; Mt. Vernon Times Square Mall; Mt. Vernon Veterans Transfer Lot; Mt. Vernon Continental Tire South Lot; Pinckneyville Park & Ride
- Annual ridership: 60,311 (2021)
- Website: South Central Transit

South Central Illinois Mass Transit District (also called South Central Transit) is a provider of mass transportation in Clinton, Franklin, Jefferson, Marion, Perry and Washington counties in Illinois, with deviated fixed-routes serving numerous cities, as well as demand-response service across the counties. As of 2021, the system provided 60,311 rides over 14,109 annual vehicle revenue hours.

== History ==
Public transit has existed in South Central Illinois since at least 1892, when the Centralia & Central City Street Railway Co. began operating horsecar service in Centralia. Streetcar service was operated locally in Centralia and Mt. Vernon until 1930 and 1917 respectively, when both cities had their streetcar systems replaced with buses. Local transit also previously had existed in Du Quoin and West Frankfort, provided by horsecar and bus respectively. Since SCT began operations, service has gradually improved with the addition of more service hours, bus shelters and more.

== Service ==
South Central Transit provides deviated fixed-route and demand-response services. There are 18 deviated fixed-routes, where two provide intra-city transit in Centralia, two provide intra-city transit in Mt. Vernon, while the remainder serve intercity trips in the region. As of June 2023, there are two routes which are temporarily suspended.

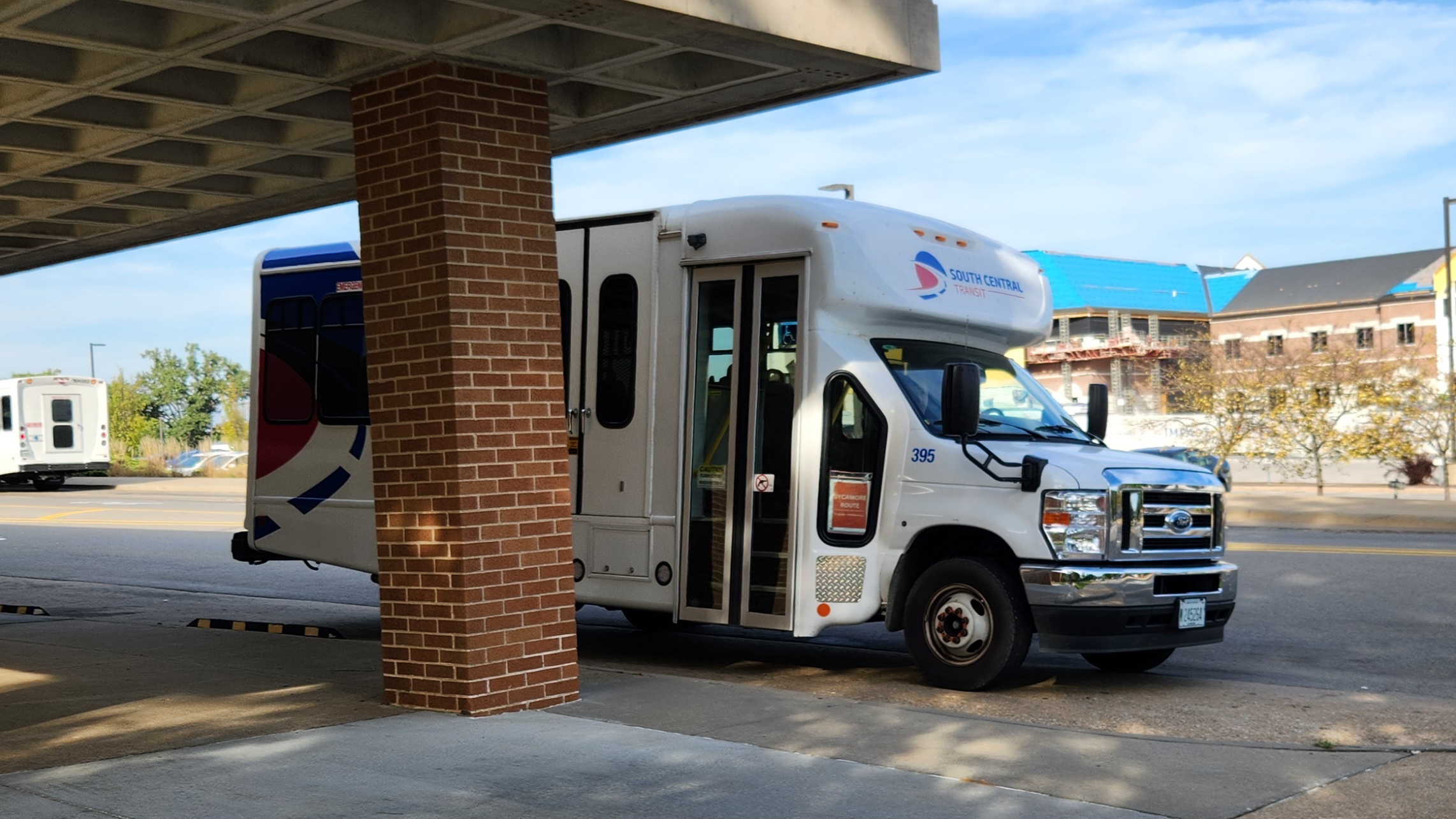
A South Central Transit Bus waits outside the SIU Student Center

=== Local Routes ===
- Cardinal Route (Centralia local)
- Cubs Route (Centralia local)
- Lincoln Route (Mt. Vernon local)
- Washington Route (Mt. Vernon local)

=== Intercity Routes ===
- Chestnut Route (serves Du Quoin, Pinckneyville and Carbondale)
- Jefferson Route (Suspended temporarily, served Mt. Vernon, Ina, Whittington, Benton, West Frankfort and Marion)
- Maple Route (serves Du Quoin, Pinckneyville and Nashville)
- Marlins Route (serves Salem, Odin, Sandoval and Centralia)
- Oak Route (serves Du Quoin, Pinckneyville, Cutler and Steeleville)
- Olive Route (serves Marion, West Frankfort, Benton, Whittington, Ina and Mt. Vernon)
- Pirates Route (Suspended temporarily, served Salem, Centralia, Dix and Mt. Vernon)
- Purple Martin Route (serves Breese, Beckemeyer, Carlyle and Centralia)
- Rangers Route (serves Benton and West Frankfort)
- Reagan Route (serves Mt. Vernon and Ashley)
- Redbirds Route (serves West Frankfort, Benton, Whittington, Ina and Mt. Vernon)
- Sycamore Route (serves Du Quoin and Pinckneyville)
- Walnut Route (serves Du Quoin, Sesser, Waltonville and Mt. Vernon)
- Yankees Route (serves Centralia, Wamac, Irvington, Richview, Ashley and Nashville)

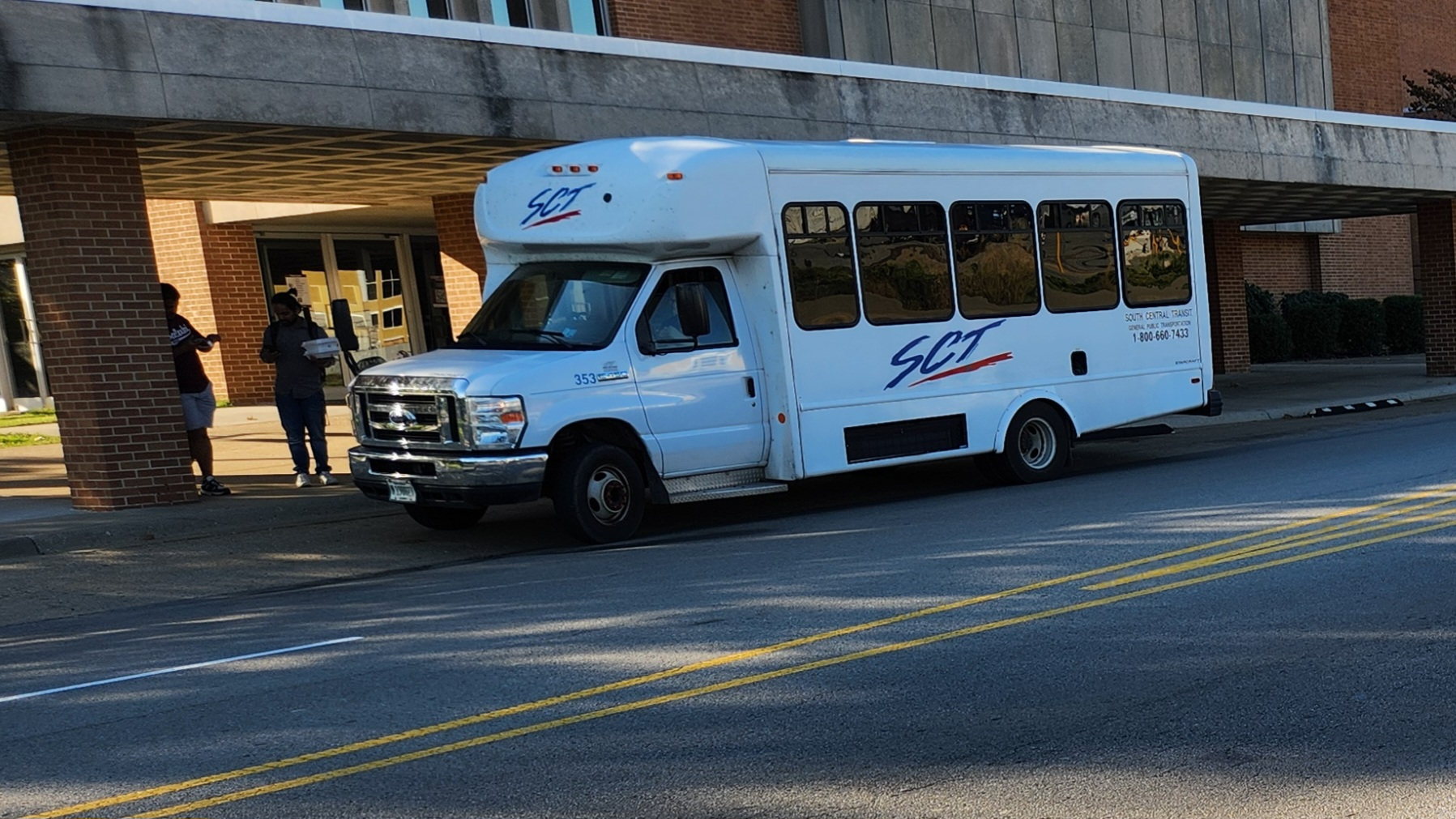
A South Central Transit bus sporting the company's previous logo

=== Transfer Points ===
- Benton Walmart
- Centralia SCT Transportation Center
- Du Quoin Bus Shelter
- Du Quoin Park & Ride
- Mt. Vernon Times Square Mall
- Mt. Vernon Veterans Transfer Lot
- Mt. Vernon Continental Tire South Lot
- Pinckneyville Park & Ride

== Fixed Route Ridership ==
The ridership statistics shown here are of fixed route services only and do not include demand response.

== See also ==
- List of bus transit systems in the United States
- Centralia station
- Du Quoin station
