= River Cities (train) =

1984–1993 Amtrak train from Kansas City to New Orleans

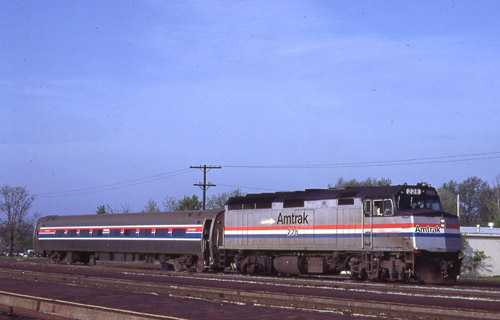
- The River Cities at Centralia in May 1984

Overview
- Service type: Inter-city rail
- Status: Discontinued
- Locale: Midwestern United States
- First service: April 29, 1984
- Last service: November 4, 1993
- Former operator: Amtrak

Route
- Termini: Kansas City, Missouri; New Orleans, Louisiana
- Stops: 25
- Distance travelled: 1,014 miles (1,632 km)
- Average journey time: 22 hours
- Service frequency: Daily
- Train number: 358, 359

On-board services
- Class: Reserved coach
- Catering facilities: On-board cafe (Kansas City—St. Louis); Diner-lounge (Carbondale—New Orleans)
- Observation facilities: Dome lounge (Carbondale—New Orleans)

Technical
- Track gauge: 4 ft 8 1/2 in (1,435 mm)

The River Cities was a passenger train operated by Amtrak from 1984 to 1993 between Kansas City, Missouri, and New Orleans, Louisiana, via St. Louis, Missouri. It operated as a section of the City of New Orleans and the Mules.

The two trains split in Carbondale, Illinois, with the River Cities continuing 117 miles (188 km) to St. Louis, where it joined with a Kansas City Mule. For southbound trains the procedure was reversed; the River Cities would split from a St. Louis Mule and proceed to Carbondale, where it joined with the City of New Orleans for the journey to New Orleans. Before the Amtrak era, the City of New Orleans and its nighttime companion, the Panama Limited, had operated St. Louis sections that split in Carbondale.

Amtrak ended the service on November 4, 1993, as part of national cost-cutting measures, and instituted Amtrak Thruway service between St. Louis and Centralia, Illinois (since extended to Carbondale). The only city to permanently lose service was Belleville, Illinois.

== Potential restoration ==
In June 2021, Senator Jon Tester of Montana added an amendment to the Surface Transportation Investment Act of 2021 which would require the Department of Transportation (not Amtrak itself) to evaluate the restoration of discontinued long-distance routes such as the River Cities. The bill passed the Senate Commerce Committee with bipartisan support, and was later rolled into President Biden's Bipartisan Infrastructure Deal, which has since been passed by Congress as the Infrastructure Investment and Jobs Act.
