= City of New Orleans (train) =

Amtrak service between Chicago and New Orleans, US

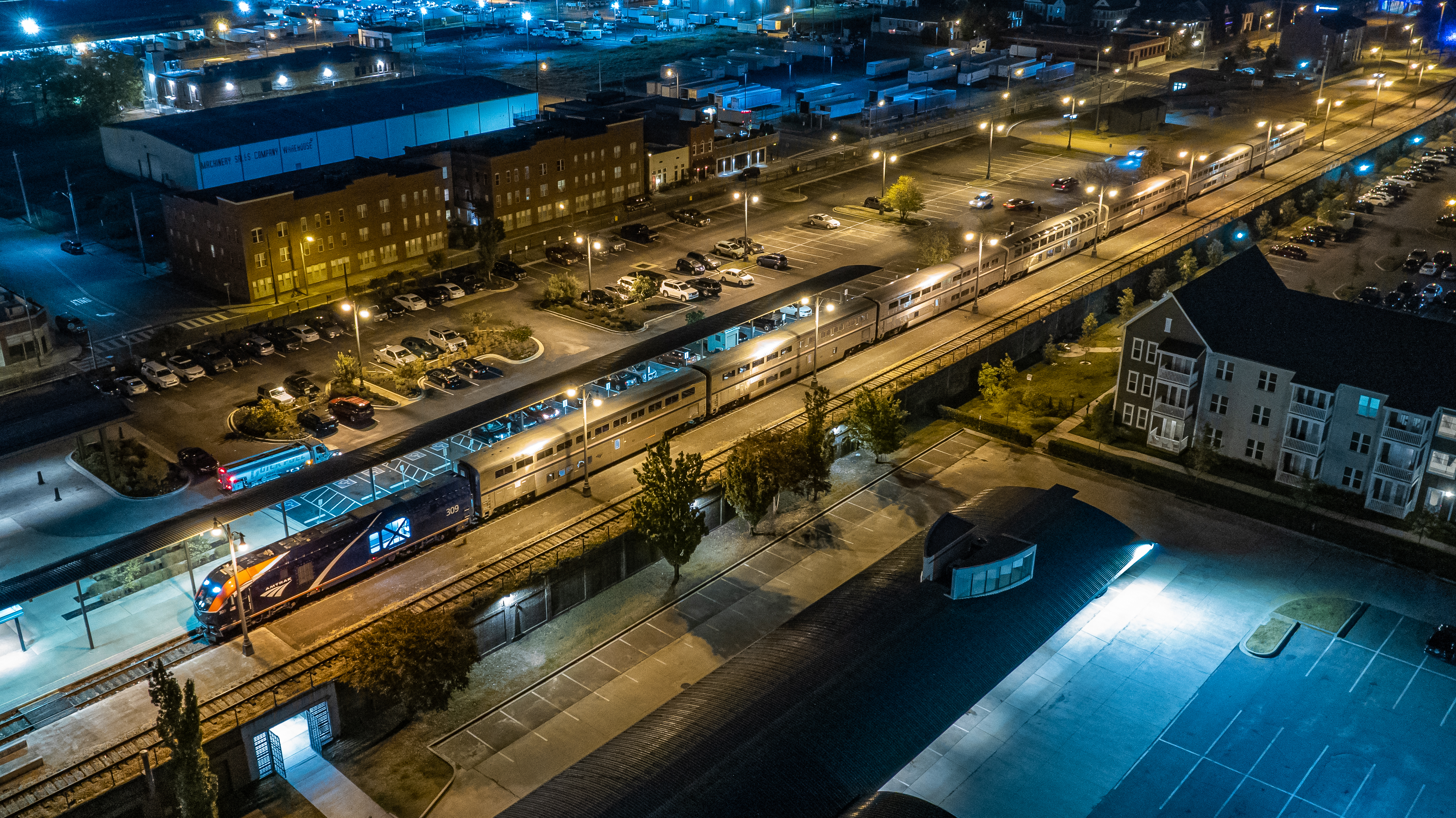
- The City of New Orleans at Memphis Central Station in November 2022

Overview
- Service type: Long distance passenger train
- Locale: Central United States
- Predecessor: Panama Limited
- First service: April 27, 1947
- Current operator: Amtrak
- Former operator: Illinois Central
- Annual ridership: 234,687 (FY 25) ▼ -2.9% (Note: Amtrak's Fiscal Year (FY) runs from October 1 of the prior year to September 30 of the named year.)

Route
- Termini: Chicago, Illinois; New Orleans, Louisiana
- Stops: 17
- Distance travelled: 934 miles (1,503 km)
- Average journey time: 19 hours, 30 minutes
- Service frequency: Daily
- Train number: 58, 59

On-board services
- Classes: Coach Class; First Class Sleeper Service
- Disabled access: Train lower level, all stations
- Sleeping arrangements: Roomette (2 beds); Bedroom (2 beds); Bedroom Suite (4 beds); Accessible Bedroom (2 beds); Family Bedroom (4 beds)
- Catering facilities: Dining car, Café
- Observation facilities: Sightseer lounge car
- Baggage facilities: Overhead racks

Technical
- Rolling stock: Superliner
- Track gauge: 4 ft 8 1/2 in (1,435 mm) standard gauge
- Operating speed: 48 mph (77 km/h) (avg.); 79 mph (127 km/h) (top)
- Track owner: CN

The City of New Orleans is a long-distance passenger train operated by Amtrak in the Central United States between Chicago and New Orleans. The overnight train takes about 19 1/2 hours to complete its 934-mile (1,503 km) route, making major stops in Champaign–Urbana, Carbondale, Memphis, and Jackson as well as in other small towns.

The City of New Orleans was first initiated by the Illinois Central Railroad in 1947 as the daytime complement to the Panama Limited, a night train dating back to 1911. In 1971 both routes were conveyed to Amtrak, which retained only the Panama Limited. In 1981 Amtrak revived the City of New Orleans name for the train, still on an overnight schedule, on the heels of the popular song of the same name by Steve Goodman.

Additional corridor service on the northern segment of the route is provided by the Illini and Saluki between Chicago and Carbondale, Illinois. The City of New Orleans is the only Amtrak train to serve Tennessee.

During fiscal year 2023, the train carried 233,876 passengers, an increase of 50.3% from FY2022. In FY2016, the last year that route-specific revenue data was given, the train had a total revenue of $18,706,915, a 3.7% decrease from FY2015.

== History ==
=== Illinois Central ===
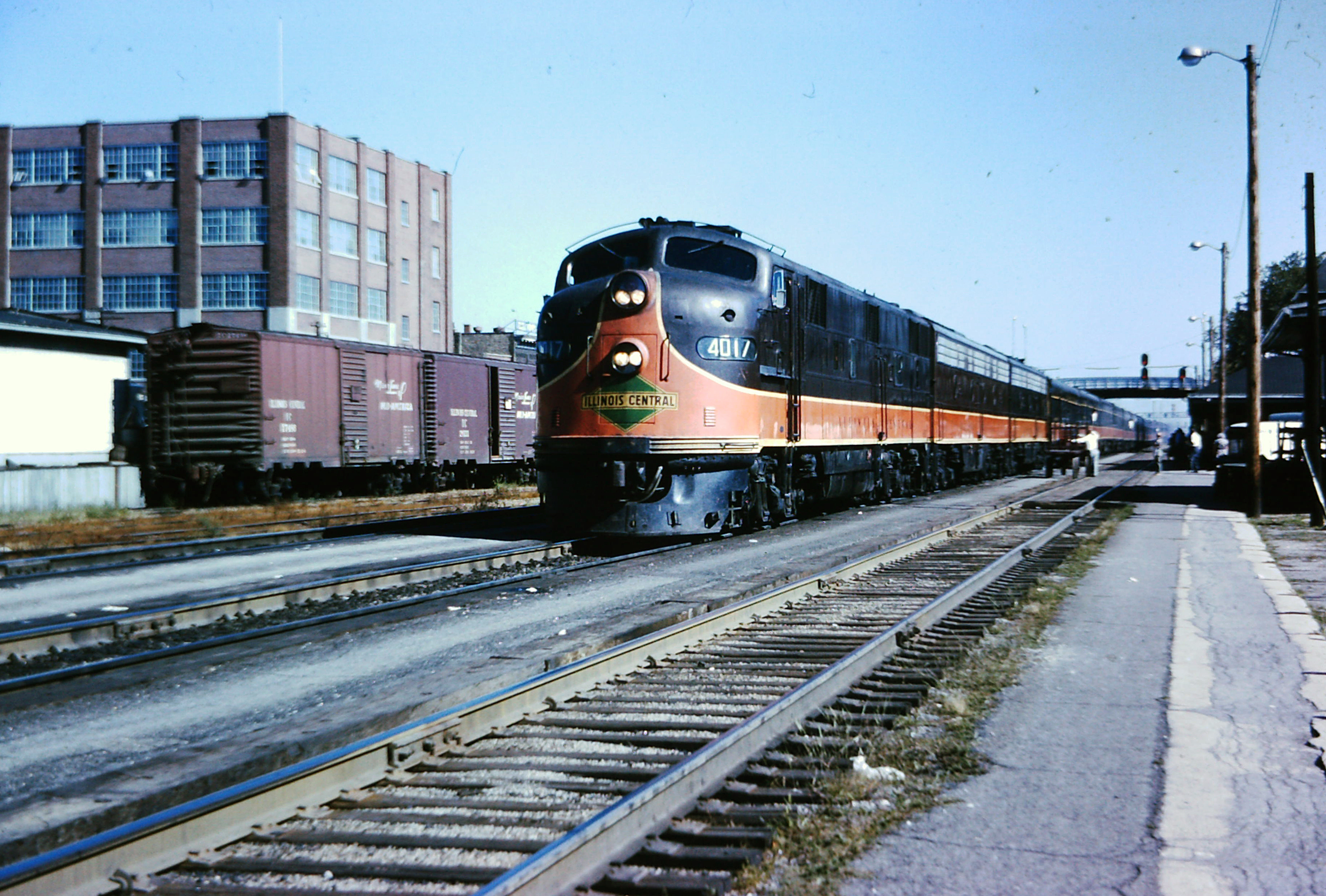
IC #4017, an EMD E7, leads the City of New Orleans at Kankakee, Illinois in August 1964.

The Illinois Central Railroad introduced the original City of New Orleans on April 27, 1947. It was a daytime, all-coach companion to the overnight Panama Limited, which had been all-Pullman for most of its run. EMD E7 diesel locomotives pulled new lightweight Pullman Company coaches. The 921-mile (1,482 km) route, which the City of New Orleans covered in 15 hours 55 minutes, was the longest daytime schedule in the United States. The City of New Orleans exchanged St. Louis—New Orleans through cars at Carbondale, Illinois and Louisville—New Orleans cars at Fulton, Kentucky. The average speed of the new train was nearly 60 mph (97 km/h) with a maximum of 100 mph (160 km/h); a result of the largely flat route of the Illinois Central along the Mississippi River. By October 25, 1959, the timetable had lengthened to 16 hours 30 minutes. The train remained popular throughout the 1960s and gained ex-Missouri Pacific Railroad dome coaches in 1967.

=== Amtrak ===
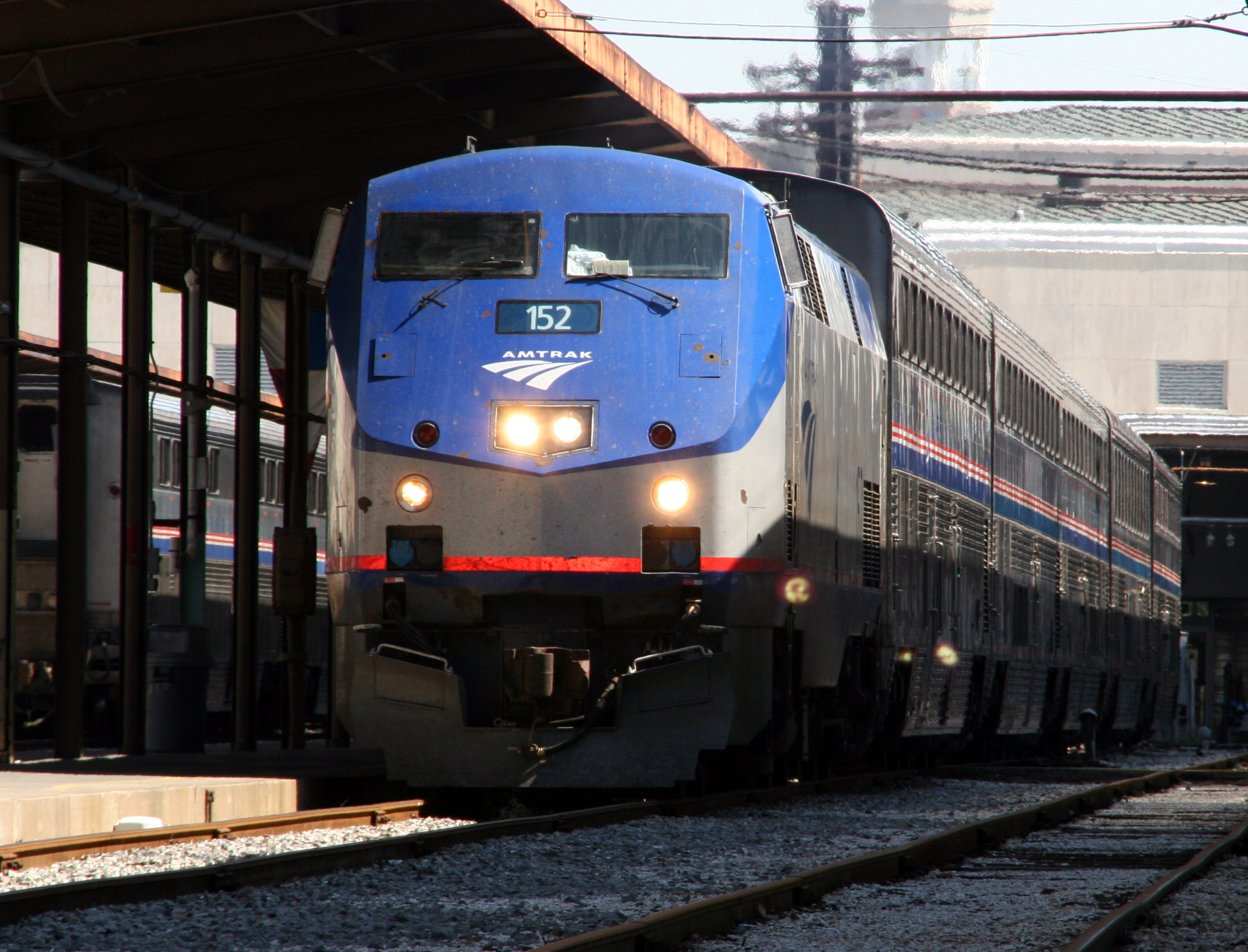
City of New Orleans, October 2005

When Amtrak assumed operation of U.S. passenger train service on May 1, 1971, it dropped the Panama Limited in favor of retaining the City of New Orleans on the traditional daytime schedule. At that time the City of New Orleans was one of four trains that called at Chicago's Central Station, which was originally Illinois Central's terminal in Chicago. All Amtrak trains were consolidated to Union Station by March 1972. Inauspiciously, the City of New Orleans was involved in Amtrak's first fatal derailment on June 10, near Salem, Illinois. Because this train made no connections with other trains at either New Orleans or Chicago, Amtrak moved the train to an overnight schedule on November 14, 1971, and renamed it the Panama Limited.

In February 1981, Amtrak restored the City of New Orleans name while retaining the overnight schedule; Amtrak hoped to capitalize on the popularity of the song written by Steve Goodman and recorded in 1972 by Arlo Guthrie. A Kansas City section, the River Cities, began operation on April 29, 1984. It separated from the City of New Orleans at Centralia, Illinois (later Carbondale) and ran to Kansas City via St. Louis. This section ended on November 4, 1994. The northbound City of New Orleans began stopping at Gilman, Illinois, on October 26, 1986. Gilman had last seen service in 1971; the Illini stopped there as well. Service to Cairo, Illinois, south of Carbondale, ended on October 25, 1987.

Amtrak operated the City of New Orleans reliably through the 1980s and into the 1990s; in 1992, the City of New Orleans had the highest on-time performance rate of all Amtrak services at 87%. Nevertheless, on-board service had declined; Trains magazine editor J. David Ingles called the train "Amtrak's least-glamorous long-distance train". On March 3, 1994, new Superliner cars replaced the single-level cars. Real dining service returned; by the early 1990s an Amfleet dinette had doubled with the lounge car.

In 1995 the City of New Orleans shifted from the Grenada District (blue) to the Yazoo District (red) in northern Mississippi.

On September 10, 1995, the train was rerouted between Memphis and Jackson due to the Illinois Central's desire to abandon the original route (the Grenada District) in favor of the newer and flatter Yazoo District. Five towns in the Mississippi Delta lost service–Batesville, Grenada, Winona, Durant, and Canton.

On March 15, 1999, the City of New Orleans collided with a flatbed semi-trailer near Bourbonnais. Of the 217 people aboard the train, eleven people were killed in the Bourbonnais train accident. The fourth car, where the fatalities occurred, was engulfed in flames following the collision at the crossing.

Because of damage in Mississippi and Louisiana due to Hurricane Katrina, Amtrak was forced in late August 2005 to truncate the City of New Orleans at Memphis, Tennessee. Service was first restored as far south as Hammond, Louisiana, and on October 8, 2005, Amtrak resumed service to New Orleans. In December 2005 Arlo Guthrie, who helped popularize the song "City of New Orleans", led a fundraiser aboard the City of New Orleans and at several stops along the train's route to help in the hurricane recovery efforts.

The train began stopping at Marks, Mississippi, on April 4, 2018, following the completion of a new station.

Starting October 1, 2019, traditional dining car services were removed and replaced with a reduced menu of 'Flexible Dining' options.

From October 1, 2020, to May 31, 2021, daily service was reduced to three trains per week due to the COVID-19 pandemic.

==== Proposed expansion ====
In 2016, Amtrak released a study on bringing passenger rail to the Gulf Coast that recommended extending the City of New Orleans to Orlando, Florida along trackage once traversed by the Sunset Limited but unserved since Hurricane Katrina.

The Chicago Region Environmental and Transportation Efficiency Program (CREATE) is in the preliminary design phase for the Grand Crossing Project. This project will reroute the Illini, Saluki, and City of New Orleans trains from CN's tracks to Norfolk Southern's Chicago Line in the Greater Grand Crossing neighborhood in Chicago. This will eliminate a time-consuming switchback on the St. Charles Air Line into Chicago Union Station.

In 2023, Louis Armstrong New Orleans International Airport began seeking federal funding for a people mover linking the airport to a new station serving the planned New Orleans–Baton Rouge passenger rail service, as well as the City of New Orleans.

== Route details ==
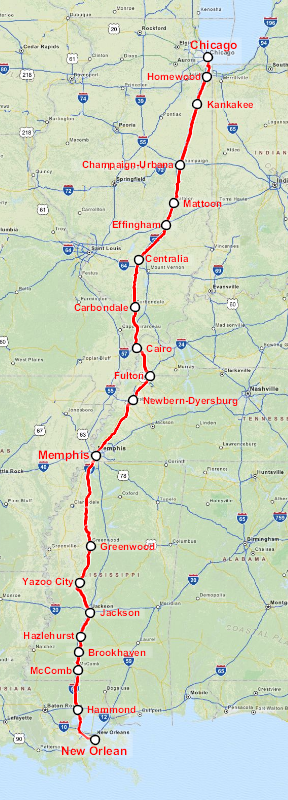
City of New Orleans route map

The City of New Orleans uses rail lines that were once part of the Illinois Central Railroad system, and are now owned by the Canadian National Railway (CN):

- St. Charles Air Line Railroad (IC), Chicago Union Station to the shore of Lake Michigan, now CN
- Illinois Central Railroad Chicago Branch and main line, Chicago to Cairo, Illinois, now CN
- Chicago, St. Louis and New Orleans Railroad (IC), Cairo to Fulton, Kentucky, now CN
- Chesapeake, Ohio and Southwestern Railroad (IC), Fulton to Memphis, Tennessee, now CN
- Yazoo and Mississippi Valley Railroad (IC), Memphis to Jackson, Mississippi, now CN
- Chicago, St. Louis and New Orleans Railroad (IC), Jackson to New Orleans, Louisiana, now CN

As of 2023, the southbound City of New Orleans leaves Chicago at 8 p.m., traveling overnight through southern Illinois and Kentucky for arrival at breakfast time the following morning in Memphis, lunchtime in Jackson, and mid-afternoon in New Orleans. Northbound trains leave New Orleans in early afternoon, arriving in Jackson in early evening, then traveling through Tennessee and southern Illinois overnight before arriving in Champaign-Urbana at breakfast time the following morning and Chicago just after rush hour.

The train is the sole Amtrak service in Tennessee, making stops at Memphis and Newbern.

In 2023, the City of New Orleans on-time performance was 75%.

=== Stations ===
Amtrak City of New Orleans stations
State/Province	City	Station
Illinois	Chicago	Chicago Union
Illinois	Homewood	Homewood
Illinois	Kankakee	Kankakee
Illinois	Champaign	Champaign–Urbana
Illinois	Mattoon	Mattoon
Illinois	Effingham	Effingham
Illinois	Centralia	Centralia
Illinois	Carbondale	Carbondale
Kentucky	Fulton	Fulton
Tennessee	Newbern	Newbern–Dyersburg
Tennessee	Memphis	Memphis Central
Mississippi	Marks	Marks
Mississippi	Greenwood	Greenwood
Mississippi	Yazoo City	Yazoo City
Mississippi	Jackson	Jackson
Mississippi	Hazlehurst	Hazlehurst
Mississippi	Brookhaven	Brookhaven
Mississippi	McComb	McComb
Louisiana	Hammond	Hammond
Louisiana	New Orleans	New Orleans

== Equipment ==
A typical City of New Orleans consist includes:

- GE Genesis/Siemens ALC-42 locomotive
- Viewliner Baggage car
- Superliner Transition-sleeper
- Superliner Sleeper
- Superliner Diner-Lounge
- Superliner Sightseer Lounge
- Superliner Coach
- Superliner Coach
- Superliner Coach-baggage

== Folk song ==
"City of New Orleans" is a folk song written and first performed by Steve Goodman in 1970 and subsequently recorded by Arlo Guthrie in 1972. Many other artists, notably Willie Nelson, Johnny Cash, John Denver (with slightly different lyrics), Judy Collins, and Jerry Reed have also recorded it. The song lyrics trace the trail of the train route in mourning the "...disappearin' railroad blues...."

Tom Rush performed and recorded a folk song (based on some Bukka White songs) about the Panama Limited, the overnight train along the same route as the City of New Orleans.

== See also ==
- Passenger train service on the Illinois Central Railroad
