= Panama Limited =

Former American passenger train

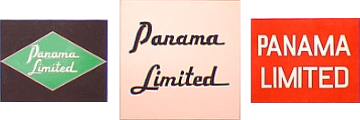

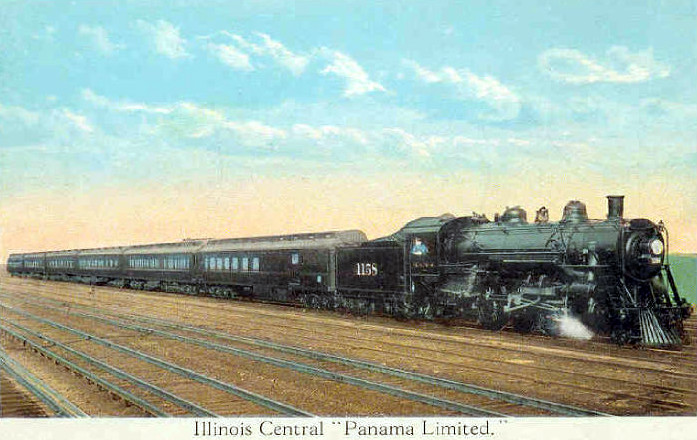
- Postcard depiction of the train, c. 1917.

Overview
- Service type: Inter-city rail
- Status: discontinued
- Locale: Central United States
- First service: February 4, 1911 (IC); November 14, 1971 (Amtrak)
- Last service: April 30, 1971 (IC); February 1, 1981 (Amtrak)
- Successor: City of New Orleans
- Former operators: Illinois Central Railroad (1911–1971); Amtrak (1971–1981)

Route
- Termini: Chicago, Illinois; St. Louis, Missouri New Orleans, Louisiana
- Stops: 19 (Chicago - New Orleans); 20 (New Orleans - Chicago); 17 (St. Louis - New Orleans)
- Average journey time: 16 hours 30 minutes (Chicago - New Orleans); 14 hours 15 minutes (St. Louis - New Orleans)
- Service frequency: Daily
- Train numbers: 5 (Chicago - New Orleans); 6 (New Orleans - Chicago); 105-5 (St. Louis - New Orleans); 6-16 (New Orleans - St. Louis)

On-board services
- Seating arrangements: No coaches
- Sleeping arrangements: Sections, roomettes, double bedrooms, drawing room, compartment
- Catering facilities: Dining car

Technical
- Track gauge: 1,435 mm (4 ft 8 1/2 in)
- Operating speed: 55.8 mph (Chicago - New Orleans); 49.8 mph (St. Louis - New Orleans); 48.1 mph (New Orleans - St. Louis)
- Track owner: Illinois Central Railroad

The Panama Limited was a passenger train operated from 1911 to 1971 between Chicago, Illinois, and New Orleans, Louisiana. The flagship train of the Illinois Central Railroad, it took its name from the Panama Canal, which in 1911 was three years from completion. For most of its career, the train was "all-Pullman", carrying sleeping cars only. The Panama Limited was one of many trains discontinued when Amtrak began operations in 1971, though Amtrak revived the name later that year and continued it until 1981.

Since 1981, overnight service between Chicago and New Orleans is provided by Amtrak's City of New Orleans, another former Illinois Central train that before Amtrak was the daytime counterpart of the Panama Limited.

== History ==
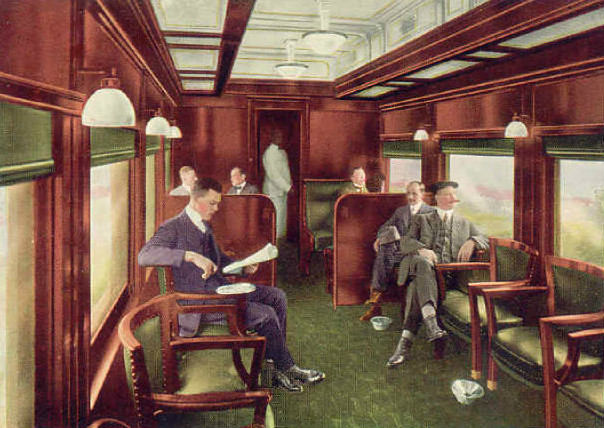
Interior of the club car on the Panama Limited, c. 1917.

In the early 1900s, the Illinois Central's premier train on the Chicago-New Orleans route was the Chicago and New Orleans Limited. On February 4, 1911, the Illinois Central renamed this train the Panama Limited, in honor of the anticipated opening of the Panama Canal. The train included a St. Louis, Missouri, section that connected at Carbondale, Illinois. The train was first-class only north of Memphis, Tennessee. It carried through sleepers for Hot Springs, Arkansas, and San Antonio, Texas. It made the journey in 25 hours.

In 1912, the train was replaced with an all-steel, all-electric consist. The Illinois Central relaunched the train on November 15, 1916, with new equipment and a new schedule: 23 hours from Chicago to New Orleans, all-Pullman. Its old equipment and schedule became a new train, the Louisiane.

The Great Depression led the Illinois Central to discontinue the luxurious Panama Limited between May 28, 1932, and December 2, 1934. When it returned, it had new air-conditioned equipment and a faster, 20-hour schedule between Chicago and New Orleans.

=== Streamliner ===
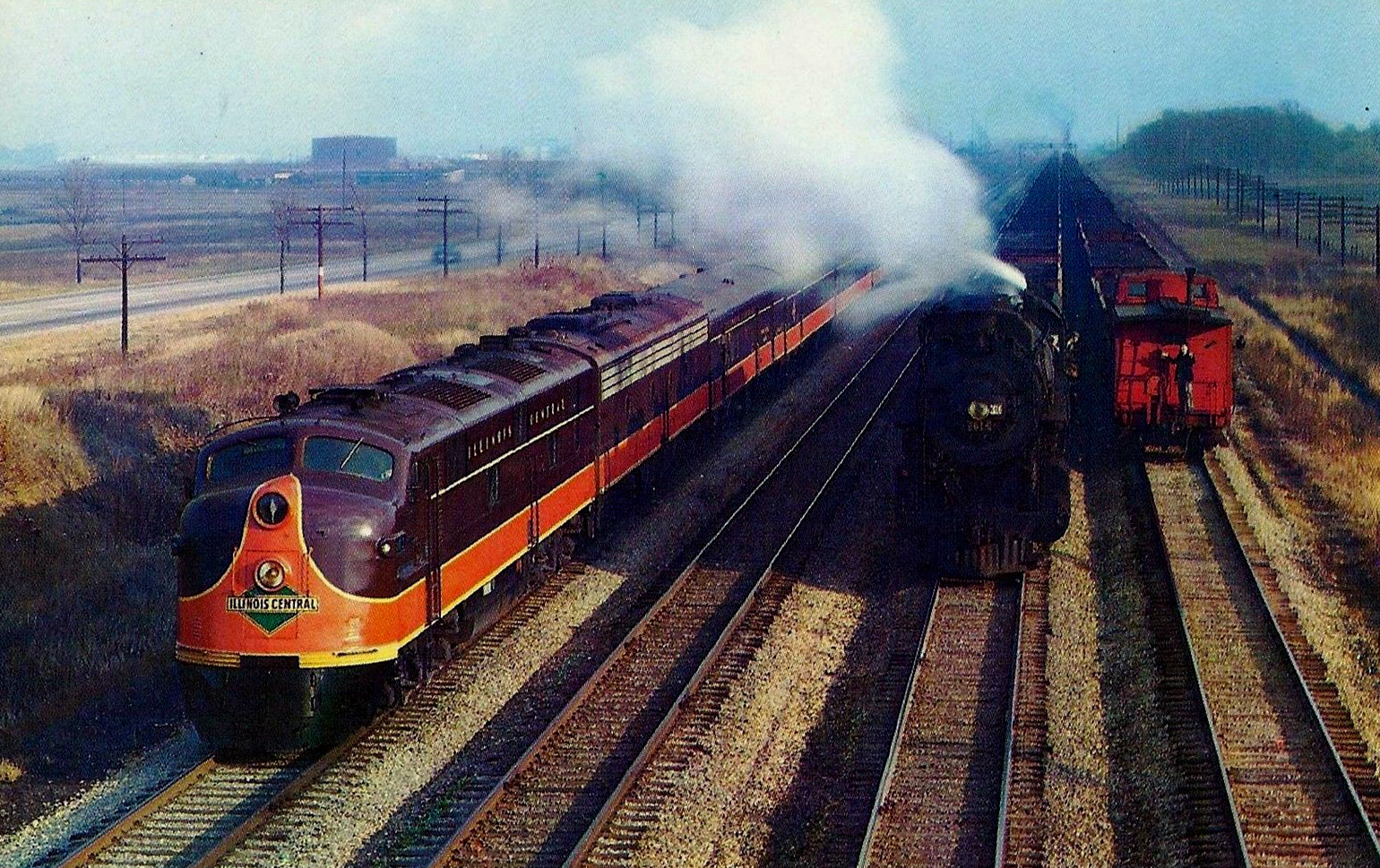
The streamlined Panama Limited, c. 1940s or 1950s

The Panama Limited was dieselized and streamlined in 1942, during World War II. The Illinois Central had ordered two lightweight sets of equipment before the attack on Pearl Harbor; after an appeal, the War Production Board allowed their delivery. The first diesel/electric-powered streamlined run of the Panama Limited was on May 3, 1942, on an 18-hour schedule. On hand for the first run was Janie Jones, the widow of famed engineer Casey Jones. The Panama Limited carried a new orange-and-brown paint scheme that later became standard on Illinois Central passenger trains. Today, Metra, Chicago's commuter rail system, honors this scheme by identifying the Metra Electric District, the Illinois Central's former commuter service to the southern suburbs, as "Panama Orange" on system maps and timetables.

For the duration of WWII, the Illinois Central dropped the extra fare. In June 1946, the schedule dropped to 17 hours. Later, the extra fare was reinstated, and the schedule was reduced to 16 hours, 30 minutes. In 1947, the Illinois Central introduced the City of New Orleans as a daytime, all-coach companion to the Panama Limited along the same route. This created the longest daylight run in the United States.

The Panama Limited maintained a high level of service for most of its existence. It was noted for its dining car service, with a first-rate culinary staff and creole fare in the Vieux Carre-themed dining cars, a service which the Illinois Central marketed heavily. A well-known multi-course meal on the Panama Limited was the Kings Dinner, for about $10; other deluxe, complete meals such as steak or lobster, including wine or cocktail, were priced around $4 to $5. In 1952, the Illinois Central acquired several 2-unit 175-foot (53 m) dining cars from the Chesapeake and Ohio Railway which it used on the Panama. With the Pennsylvania's Broadway Limited it was one of the last two "all-Pullman" trains in the United States.

On October 29, 1967, the Illinois Central added coaches to the Panama Limited for the first time in half a century, although it attempted to save face by designating the coaches the Magnolia Star. The Illinois Central dropped this separate designation on December 13, 1968. The Illinois Central petitioned the Interstate Commerce Commission to end the train altogether on November 23, 1970, but the ICC deferred the request with Amtrak due to launch the following spring.

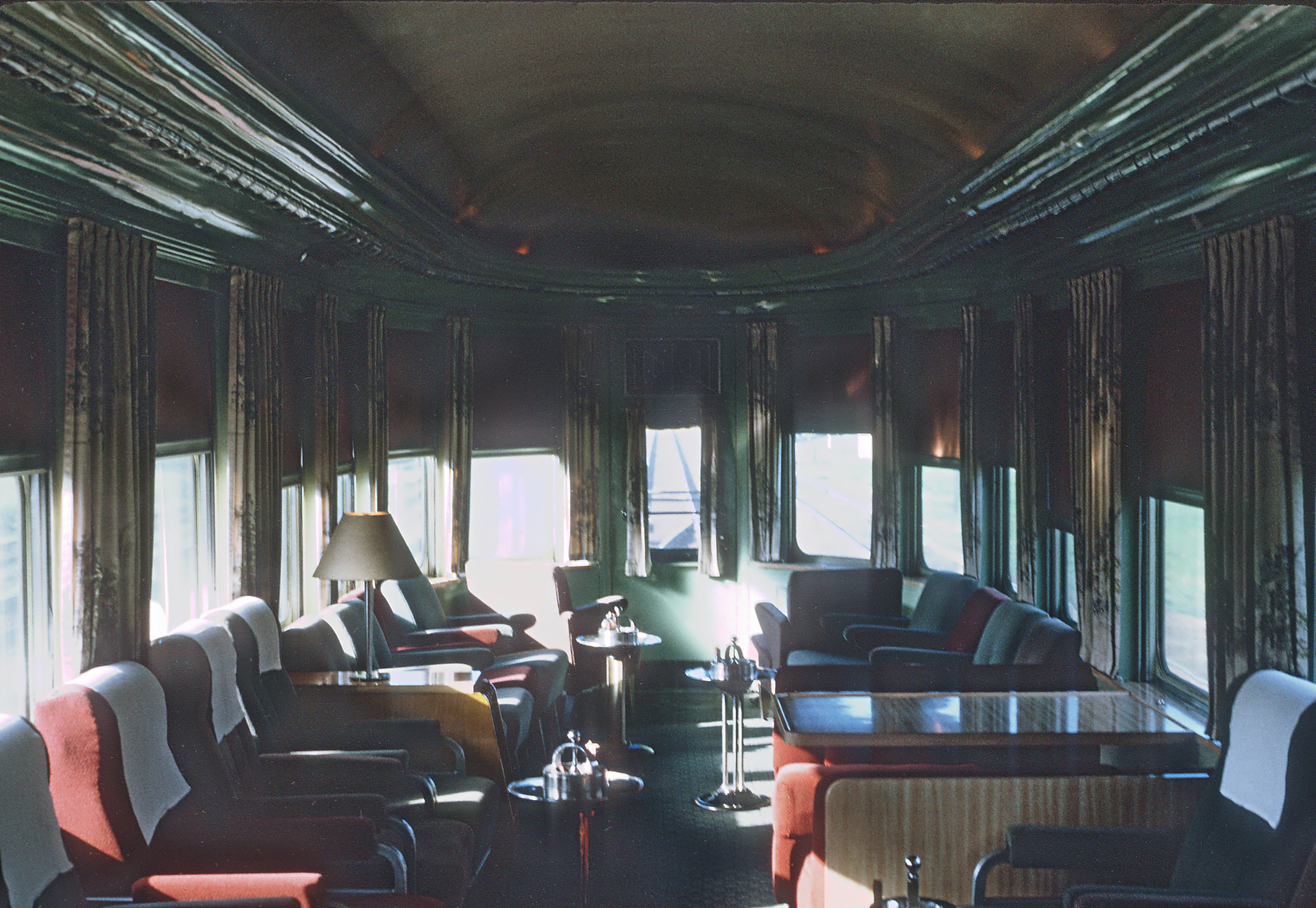
The interior of the Panama Limited in 1964

=== Amtrak service ===
The Illinois Central Railroad last ran the Panama Limited on April 30, 1971. On May 1, Amtrak took over, dropping the Panama Limited in favor of its former daytime counterpart, the City of New Orleans. This train made no connections in either New Orleans or Chicago, so Amtrak moved the train to an overnight schedule on November 14, 1971, and revived the Panama Limited name.

Amtrak restored the City of New Orleans name, while retaining the overnight schedule, on February 1, 1981. Amtrak hoped to capitalize on the popularity of the eponymous song written by Steve Goodman and recorded in 1972 by Arlo Guthrie.

== The Panama Limited in song ==
In 1923 Esther Bigeou recorded a song she is credited as composing, "The Panama Limited Blues".

A different song of the same name was composed by Richard M. Jones. Jones recorded his "Panama Limited Blues" with singer Bertha "Chippie" Hill in 1926. The same year it was covered by Ada Brown. It was later covered by Georgia White in 1940.

Another blues song "The Panama Limited" is credited to blues singer Bukka White, who recorded it in the 1930. "The Panama Limited" was popularized by folk singer Tom Rush on his self-titled debut album in 1965 and was recorded later by folk musicians Mike Cross and Doug MacLeod.

A British band of the late 1960s and early 1970s called itself Panama Limited Jug Band, later shortened to Panama Limited.

The song "Railroad Lady" was said to have been written by Jerry Jeff Walker and Jimmy Buffett on the final run of the Panama Limited, from New Orleans to Nashville.

== See also ==
- Passenger train service on the Illinois Central Railroad
