= New Orleans Union Station =

Former railroad station in Louisiana, US

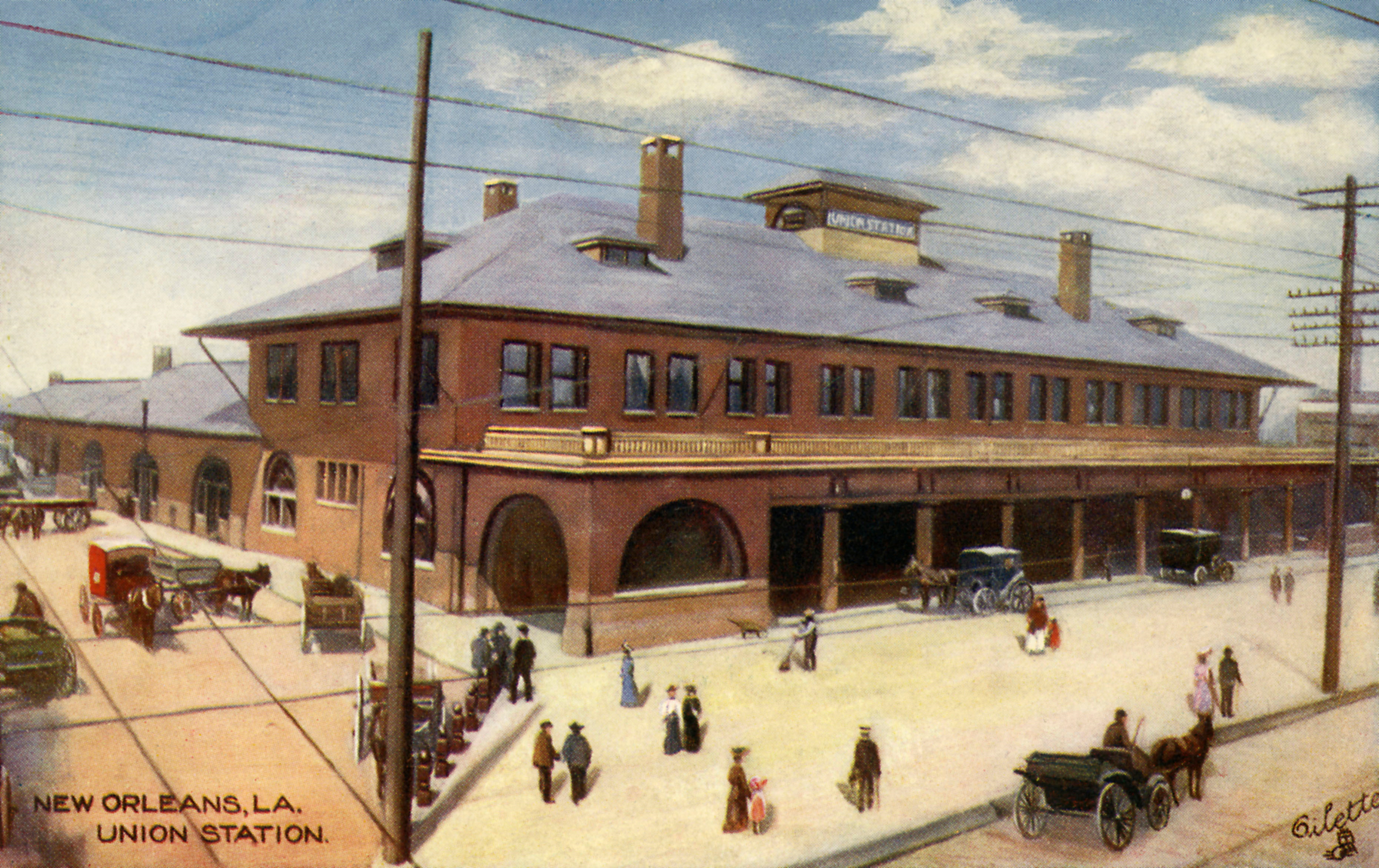
- Postcard view, c. 1900

General information
- System: Passenger Station
- Operator: Illinois Central Railroad
- Lines: Illinois Central, Southern Pacific, Yazoo and Mississippi Valley
- Platforms: 2
- Tracks: 4

History
- Opened: June 1, 1892
- Closed: January 8, 1954

Services
Preceding station	Illinois Central Railroad	Following station
Terminus	Main Line	Carrollton Avenue toward Chicago
Terminus	Yazoo and Mississippi Valley Railroad Main Line	Carrollton Avenue toward Memphis
Preceding station	Southern Pacific Railroad	Following station
Carrollton Avenue toward Los Angeles	Sunset Route	Terminus

New Orleans Union Station was a railroad station in New Orleans, Louisiana. It was designed by Louis H. Sullivan for the Illinois Central Railroad and opened on June 1, 1892. It was located on South Rampart Street, in front of the current New Orleans Union Passenger Terminal.

The station was used primarily by the Illinois Central Railroad as the terminus for its main line from Chicago, including the celebrated Panama Limited. However, it also served a number of other lines, including the Southern Pacific Railroad and its Sunset Limited. The Yazoo and Mississippi Valley Railroad, an IC subsidiary, used the station for trains from Mississippi. Missouri Pacific (Gulf Coast Lines) trains from Houston used this station although other Missouri Pacific trains used the T&P Station. Before the Huey P. Long Bridge was constructed, the Sunset and other Southern Pacific trains reached the station by ferry from Avondale. By the 1940s, a total of 13 passenger trains arrived and departed from the station daily.

New Orleans Union Station was the only train station architect Louis Sullivan designed. It was constructed in the architect's well-known 'Chicago School' style and decorated with his iconic ornament. Adler and Sullivan's head draftsman Frank Lloyd Wright was involved in the final work under Sullivan's supervision. Union Station was a three-story hip-roofed structure with a cupola, including office and waiting areas, with a broad portico with central columns and arched entryways at each end of the entrance.

New Orleans at the time of the station's construction had several other railway stations including the Texas Pacific - Missouri Pacific Railway Station on Annunciation St. between Melpomene and Thalia Streets; The Louisiana and Arkansas Railway - Kansas City Southern Railroad Station at 705 S. Rampart Street; the Southern Railway Terminal at 1125 Canal Street and the Louisville and Nashville Railroad Station, on Canal St. near the Mississippi River.

The station was demolished in 1954 and replaced by the current New Orleans Union Passenger Terminal that consolidated the inter-city railroad services.

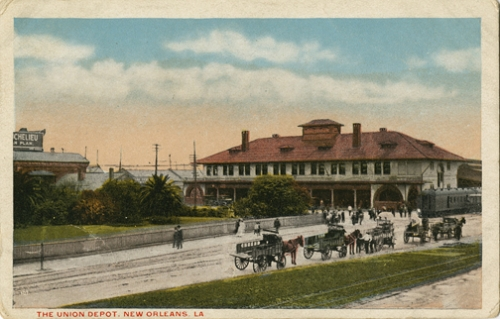
Union Depot New Orleans Postcard Wagons

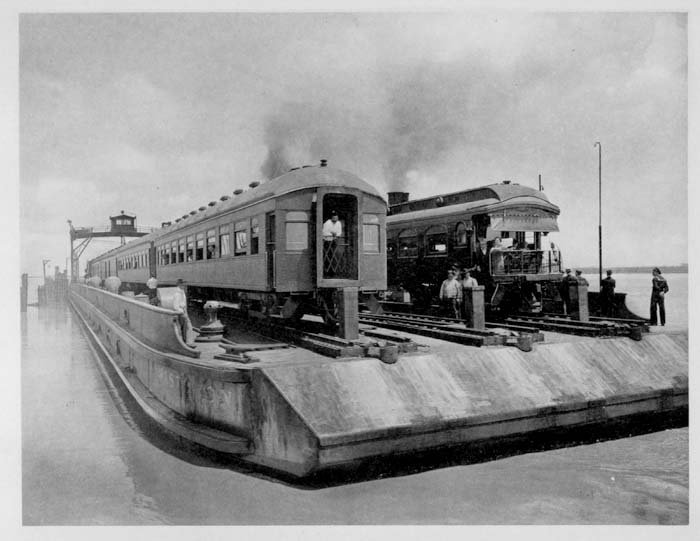
Southern Pacific Railroad in New Orleans
