= Central Illinois =

Region of Illinois, United States

Coordinates: 40.1°N 89.3°W

Central Illinois

Central Illinois is a region of the U.S. state of Illinois that consists of the entire central third of the state, divided from north to south. Also known as the Heart of Illinois, it is characterized by small towns and mid-sized cities. Agriculture, particularly corn and soybeans, as well as educational institutions and manufacturing centers, figure prominently.

A total of 45 counties are typically considered to be within Central Illinois, with a population of 1,874,635 as of the 2020 U.S. census. Major cities include Peoria, Springfield (the state capital), Decatur, Quincy, Champaign–Urbana, Bloomington–Normal, Galesburg, and Danville.

== Geography ==
Central Illinois within Illinois

Historically prairie, Central Illinois is generally flat and includes Douglas County, the state's flattest. The region also hosts a variety of man-made lakes, including Lake Shelbyville, Lake Springfield, Clinton Lake and Lake Decatur. Major rivers in the region include the Illinois, Middle Fork of the Vermilion, Kaskaskia, Sangamon and Mississippi rivers.

=== Protected areas ===
Central Illinois is home to many protected areas, many related to Abraham Lincoln. The Lincoln's New Salem State Historic Site showcases the town where Lincoln started his life as a politician. The Lincoln Home National Historic Site operated by the National Park Service is a national park featuring Lincoln's Springfield home. Chautauqua National Wildlife Refuge is a protected area where thousands of waterfowl and shorebirds live. There are many other state parks and National Wildlife Refuges in the region.

== Climate ==
The climate of central Illinois is humid continental and the area experiences all four seasons. Snow is common in the winter months and while the counties vary in snowfall rate, most receive about twenty inches of snow annually. With all precipitation combined, most counties receive about 38 inches of rain and snow annually. Severe weather, including tornadoes, is common during the spring and summer months. Rare blizzards can happen in parts of central Illinois in winter. The weather of central Illinois affects the crop season as well; droughts can sometimes happen in the summer and fall causing harm to the soybean and corn crops.

== Economy ==
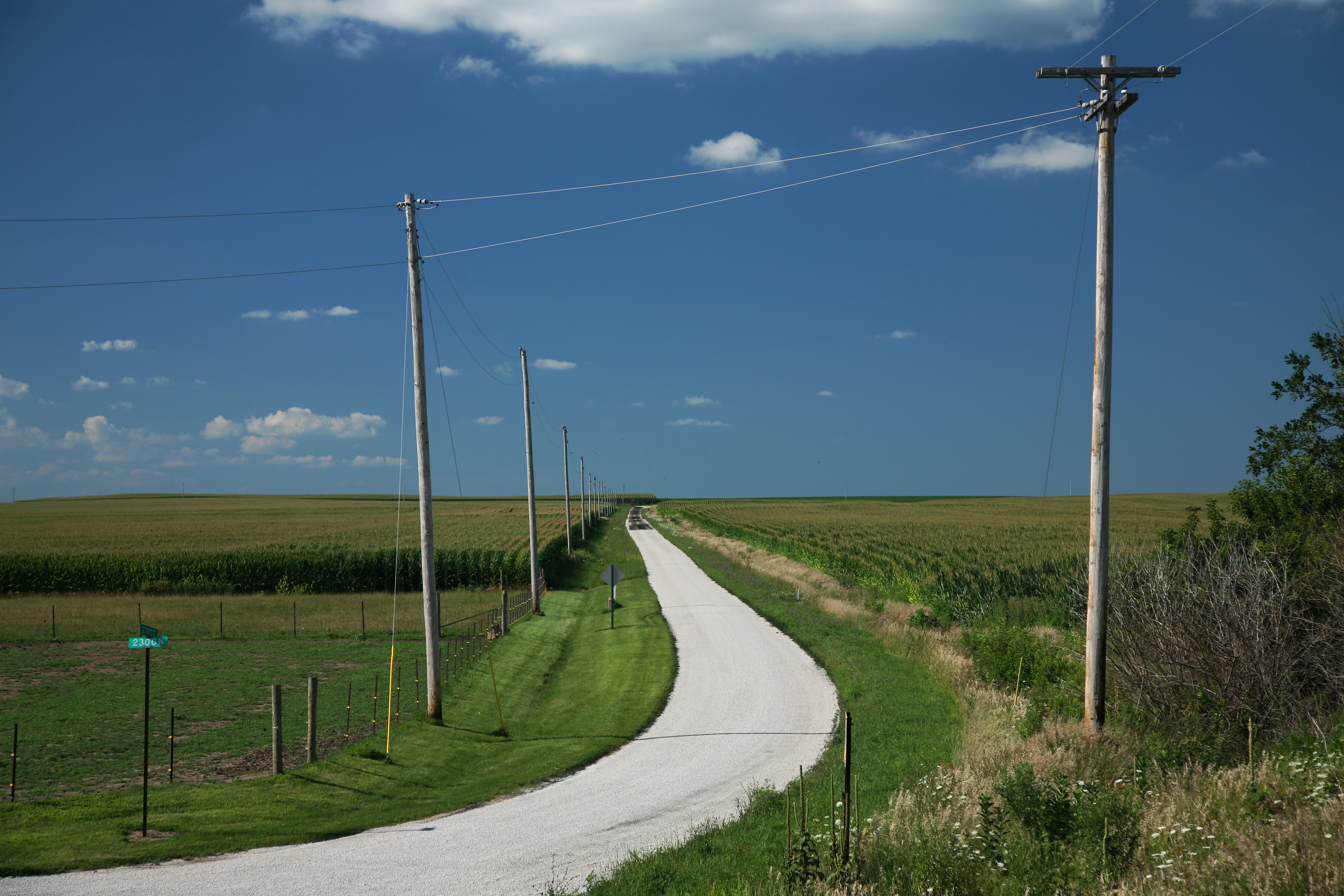
Corn fields in Central Illinois

Central Illinois has a diverse economy consisting of a variety of industries. Agriculture is the most significant industry in the region and ranges in scope from family farms to mass-production farms. Most counties in Central Illinois have an agriculture-based economy. The most common crops are soybeans and corn. County fairs and the Illinois State Fair help to promote agriculture in the region and also offer entertainment. The manufacturing and service industries are also significant. Caterpillar Inc. employs more than 15,000 workers in the region and was formerly headquartered in Peoria. Major insurance provider State Farm Insurance is headquartered in Bloomington. The Illinois government in Springfield is also a major employer of people in the region. Popular tourist sites include the Lincoln Home National Historic Site, the Old State Capitol, and the Abraham Lincoln Presidential Library and Museum. Military makes up a smaller part of the economy, but was much larger until the closing Chanute Air Force Base in 1993.

== Culture ==
Central Illinois is culturally and demographically similar to much of the Rust Belt and Midwestern United States. The southern part of the region shares much in common with Southern Illinois and northern areas of the Upland South, while the northern part has a more distinctly Midwestern character.

West-Central Illinois is also known as Forgottonia.

The area is also at the heart of one the most famous rivalries in American sports, the Cardinals–Cubs rivalry.

== Transportation ==
Transportation in central Illinois is provided by an assortment of airports, railroads, interstate highways, bus networks and the rivers. Airports with commercial service in the region include Central Illinois Regional Airport (serving Bloomington-Normal), General Wayne Downing Peoria International Airport (serving the Peoria area), Abraham Lincoln Capital Airport in Springfield, University of Illinois Willard Airport south of Savoy, Decatur Airport, and Baldwin Field in Quincy. Multiple Amtrak lines run through the region with stops in major regional cities. There are nine interstate highways located in central Illinois, six of which are primary.

=== Interstates ===
- Interstate 39
- Interstate 55
- Interstate 57
- Interstate 70
- Interstate 72
- Interstate 74
- Interstate 155
- Interstate 172
- Interstate 474

=== Transit ===
- Central Illinois Public Transportation
- Champaign County Area Rural Transit System
- Champaign–Urbana Mass Transit District
- Coles County Zipline
- Connect Transit
- CRIS Rural Mass Transit District
- Danville Mass Transit
- Decatur Public Transit System
- Dial-A-Ride Public Transportation
- Fulton County Rural Transit
- Galesburg Transit
- Go West Transit
- CityLink (Greater Peoria Mass Transit District)
- Hancock County Public Transportation
- Macoupin County Public Transit
- McDonough County Transit
- Piatt County Public Transportation
- Quincy Transit Lines
- Sangamon Mass Transit District
- Sangamon-Menard Area Rural Transit
- SHOW Bus
- Tri-County Rural Transit
- West Central Mass Transit District

== Education ==
=== Universities ===
- Bradley University
- Eastern Illinois University
- Illinois State University
- Illinois Wesleyan University
- Lincoln Christian University
- Millikin University
- Quincy University
- Southern Illinois University School of Medicine
- University of Illinois Springfield
- University of Illinois Urbana-Champaign
- University of Illinois College of Medicine
- Western Illinois University

=== Colleges ===
- Blackburn College
- Danville Area Community College
- Eureka College
- Heartland Community College
- Illinois Central College
- Illinois College
- John Wood Community College
- Knox College
- Lake Land College
- Lincoln College
- Lincoln Land Community College
- Methodist College
- Monmouth College
- Parkland College
- Principia College
- Richland Community College
- Spoon River College

=== Trade and specialty schools ===
- Blessing-Rieman College of Nursing and Health Sciences
- Lakeview College of Nursing
- Midwest Technical Institute (East Peoria)
- Midwest Technical Institute (Springfield)
- Saint Francis Medical Center College of Nursing
- Saint John’s College
- Urbana Theological Seminary
- Walther Theological Seminary

== See also ==
- Northern Illinois
- Southern Illinois
- National Weather Service Lincoln, Illinois
