= Gilman station =

Amtrak intercity train station in Gilman, Illinois

Gilman, IL
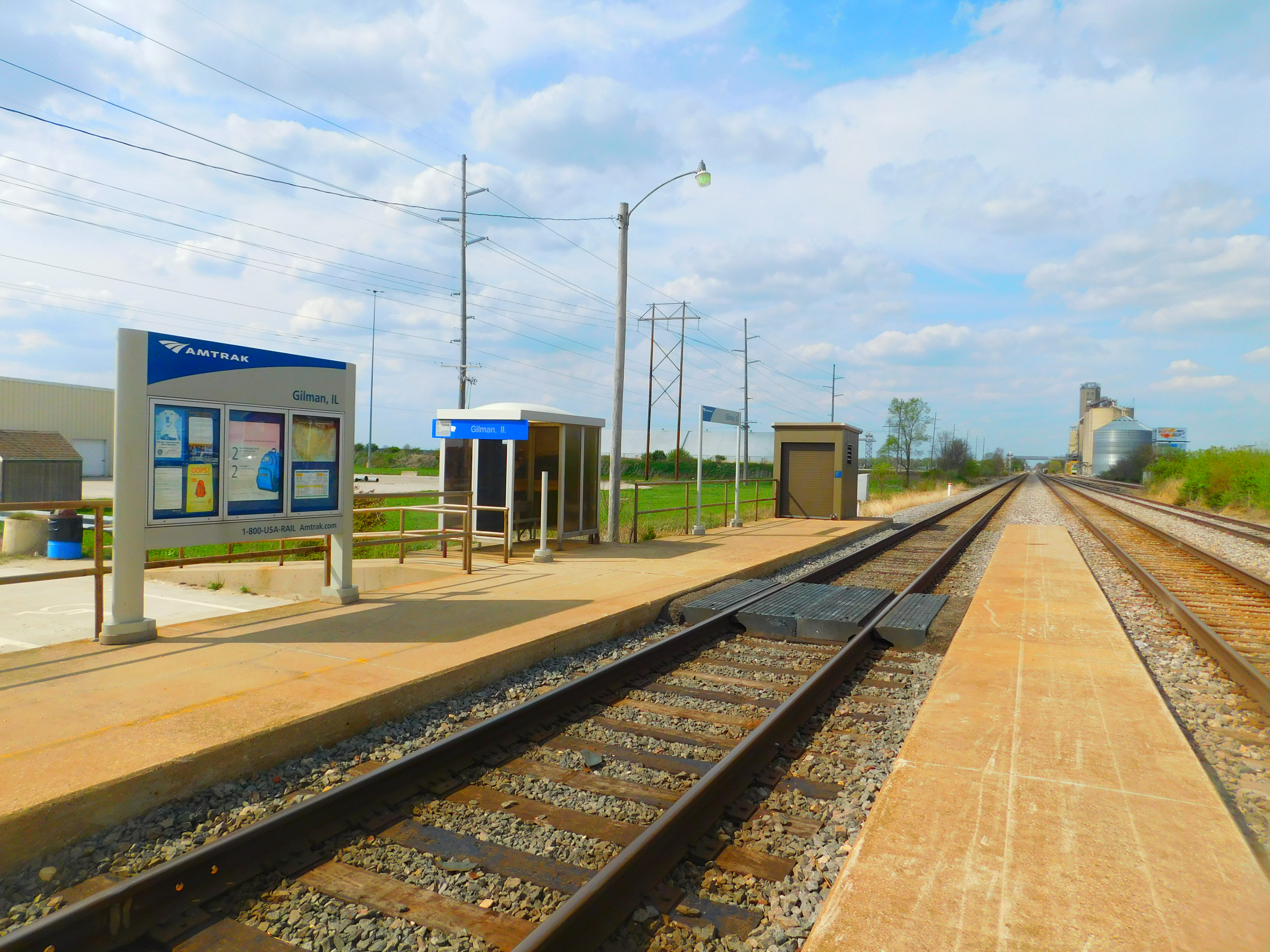
- Gilman station in April 2016.

General information
- Location: County Road 1700N (US 24) west of US 45; Gilman, Illinois; United States
- Coordinates: 40.7617°N 87.9956°W
- Line: CN Chicago Subdivision
- Platforms: 1 side platform, 1 island platform
- Tracks: 2
- Connections: SHOW Bus (dial-a-ride)

Other information
- Station code: Amtrak: GLM

History
- Opened: October 26, 1986; 39 years ago

Passengers
- 2014: 3,333 ▲2.3%
- FY 2025: 2,172 (Amtrak)

Services
| Preceding station | Amtrak | Following station |
|---|---|---|
| Rantoul toward Carbondale | Illini and Saluki | Kankakee toward Chicago |
City of New Orleans does not stop here
Former services
| Preceding station | Illinois Central Railroad | Following station |
|---|---|---|
| Onarga toward New Orleans | Main Line | Danforth toward Chicago |
| Ridgeville toward St. Louis | St. Louis – Gilman | Terminus |
| Preceding station | Amtrak | Following station |
| Champaign–Urbana toward New Orleans | City of New Orleans | Kankakee toward Chicago |
Location

Gilman station is an Amtrak intercity train station in Gilman, Illinois, United States. The stop is on their Illini and Saluki route.

Service began at Gilman on October 26, 1986, when the Illini began stopping there. It was the first passenger service at Gilman since the creation of Amtrak on May 1, 1971. The northbound City of New Orleans also served Gilman until November 10, 1996. The previous railroad station in Gilman was in the center of the city, located at the diamond junction between Illinois Central's main line to New Orleans and the Toledo, Peoria and Western Railway (TP&W). The northwest quadrant of the junction contained the Illinois Central's main line to Springfield and St Louis, which split with the New Orleans main line just north of the station. The station building is still standing and is used by the Canadian National Railway's engineering department.
