= Lakeview College of Nursing =

Private nursing college in Danville, Illinois, US

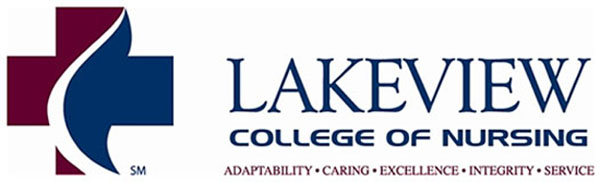
- Type: Private nursing college
- Established: 1894; 132 years ago
- Accreditation: HLC
- President: Sheila Mingee
- Faculty: 19
- Administrative staff: 14
- Students: 116 (Fall 2022)
- Location: Danville, Illinois, United States; 40.138252°N 87.644872°W
- Campus: 1 acre (0.40 ha)
- Website: www.lcn.edu

Lakeview College of Nursing is a private nursing college in Danville, Illinois. The college offers an accredited Bachelor of Science in Nursing degree.

== History ==
The Lakeview Hospital was organized in Danville in 1892, and the first patient was admitted in 1894. The same year, the Danville Training School for Nurses opened and was the only such training school in the area for 26 years.

The training initially lasted for two years; in 1901 this was increased to three years. The first class in 1894 consisted of 4 students; by 1901 the class size was 16, and by 1905 it was 29. The diploma nursing program was approved by the State of Illinois in 1911; the state formally certified the program in 1937.

The hospital was located at the corner of Logan and Fairchild streets. In 1916 and 1917 the hospital expanded to 125 beds, and in 1921 a three-story brick building was provided to the south of the hospital for use as a school and residence for the nurses. The cost of the building was about $125,000. It was used until 1976 when it was demolished to make way for an expansion of the hospital. The school was then moved to an existing building at 808 North Logan, further to the south.

During the 1940s, 1950s and 1960s, the program continued to grow. An affiliation with the Illinois Teacher's College in Charleston (now Eastern Illinois University) provided additional on-campus instruction. In the 1950s, Danville Junior College (now Danville Area Community College) began to provide general education courses for the program. Both affiliations continue. The program was first accredited by the National League for Nursing in 1971, receiving a six-year accreditation.

Prior to 1959, all students of the college had been female. The first male students entered the program that year. As of 1982, a total of 1,301 students had graduated from the program.

In 1988, the Lakeview Medical Center was purchased by the Franciscan Sisters Healthcare Corporation. The nursing program was not included in the sale and became a separate institution known as the Lakeview College of Nursing. The same year, the Webster Memorial Home (built in 1920) was donated for use by the college. This building was located at 903 North Logan, across the street from the hospital, and is still in use. It was expanded in 1993 and again in 2007.

The diploma program was replaced with a baccalaureate program, receiving approval from the State of Illinois in 1987. It was accredited by the North Central Association of Colleges and Schools in 1989, and the first class under the new program graduating in May 1990.

Lakeview College of Nursing began offering classes on the Eastern Illinois University campus in 2000; the first class there graduated in 2003. In 2007, the college purchased its own building in Charleston, thus establishing its own campus separate from EIU.

== Transportation ==
The main campus of Lakeview College of Nursing is located on the west side of Danville and is accessible via Danville Mass Transit. Route 1 provides bus service from campus to downtown Danville.

== See also ==
- Danville Area Community College

== Bibliography ==
- The Alumni Centennial Committee, ed. (1994). Lakeview: 100 Years of Caring.
