= Show Bus =

Provider of mass transportation in Central Illinois

SHOW Bus
- Founded: 1979
- Service area: Kankakee, Logan, and Mason Counties in Illinois
- Service type: Bus service and demand-response service
- Routes: 1
- Chief executive: Laura Dick
- Website: SHOW Bus

SHOW Bus is a provider of public transit in rural Kankakee County, Logan County, and Mason County in Illinois. Most service is demand-response. There is one deviated fixed-route in Kankakee County.

Since July 1, 2025, SHOW Bus is no longer the public transportation provider for DeWitt, Ford, Iroquois, Livingston, Macon, and McLean Counties in Illinois.

== History ==
Public transit has existed in rural Central Illinois since at least 1891, when the Lincoln Electric Street Railway Co. began operating streetcar service in Lincoln. Streetcar service was operated locally in Lincoln and Pontiac until 1929 and 1925, respectively, when both cities had their streetcar systems replaced with buses. In 2020 and 2022, SHOW Bus and Kankakee County received two grants as part of Rebuild Illinois to replace vehicles and upgrade a vehicle storage facility.

In June 2024, the McLean County Board voted to withdraw from its multi-county intergovernmental agreement with SHOW Bus to provide rural public transportation, which also included Livingston and Ford counties. In February 2025, Macon County ended its intergovernmental agreement with SHOW Bus. In September 2025, Livingston County voted to terminate its contract with SHOW Bus.

Since July 1, 2025, the service area of SHOW Bus has decreased significantly. Service in the following counties once provided by SHOW Bus were replaced by the following providers:

- DeWitt County: Now served by Piattran
- Ford County: Now served by Futures Connections
- Iroquois County: Now served by Futures Connections
- Livingston County: Now served by Futures Connections
- Macon County: Now served by Decatur Moves (operated by Decatur Public Transit)
- McLean County: Now served by Connect GO (operated by Connect Transit)

== Service ==
SHOW Bus provides one deviated fixed-route between Kankakee and Momence and demand-response services for the rest of its service area. All routes run weekdays only and have a regular fare of $2.

=== Past Service ===
Until 2025, SHOW Bus provided the following services:

==== Former Intercity routes ====
- Livingston-McLean County Intercity Service (served Pontiac, Chenoa, Lexington, Towanda, Bloomington and Normal)
- Route 24 Limited Stop Service (served Piper City, Chatsworth, Forrest, Fairbury, Chenoa and Pontiac)

==== Former local routes ====
- Lincoln Limited Stop Service
- Pontiac Limited Stop Service
- Watseka Limited Stop Service

==== Previous Transfer points ====
- Chenoa: Chenoa Family Restaurant
- Pontiac: City Hall
- Pontiac: Livingston County Health Department
- Pontiac: Walmart

== See also ==
- List of bus transit systems in the United States
- List of intercity bus stops in Illinois
- Amtrak stations served by SHOW Bus:
  - Gilman station
  - Kankakee station
  - Lincoln station
  - Pontiac station
  - Uptown Station
