= Kankakee station =

Amtrak station in the Illinois city of Kankakee

Kankakee, IL
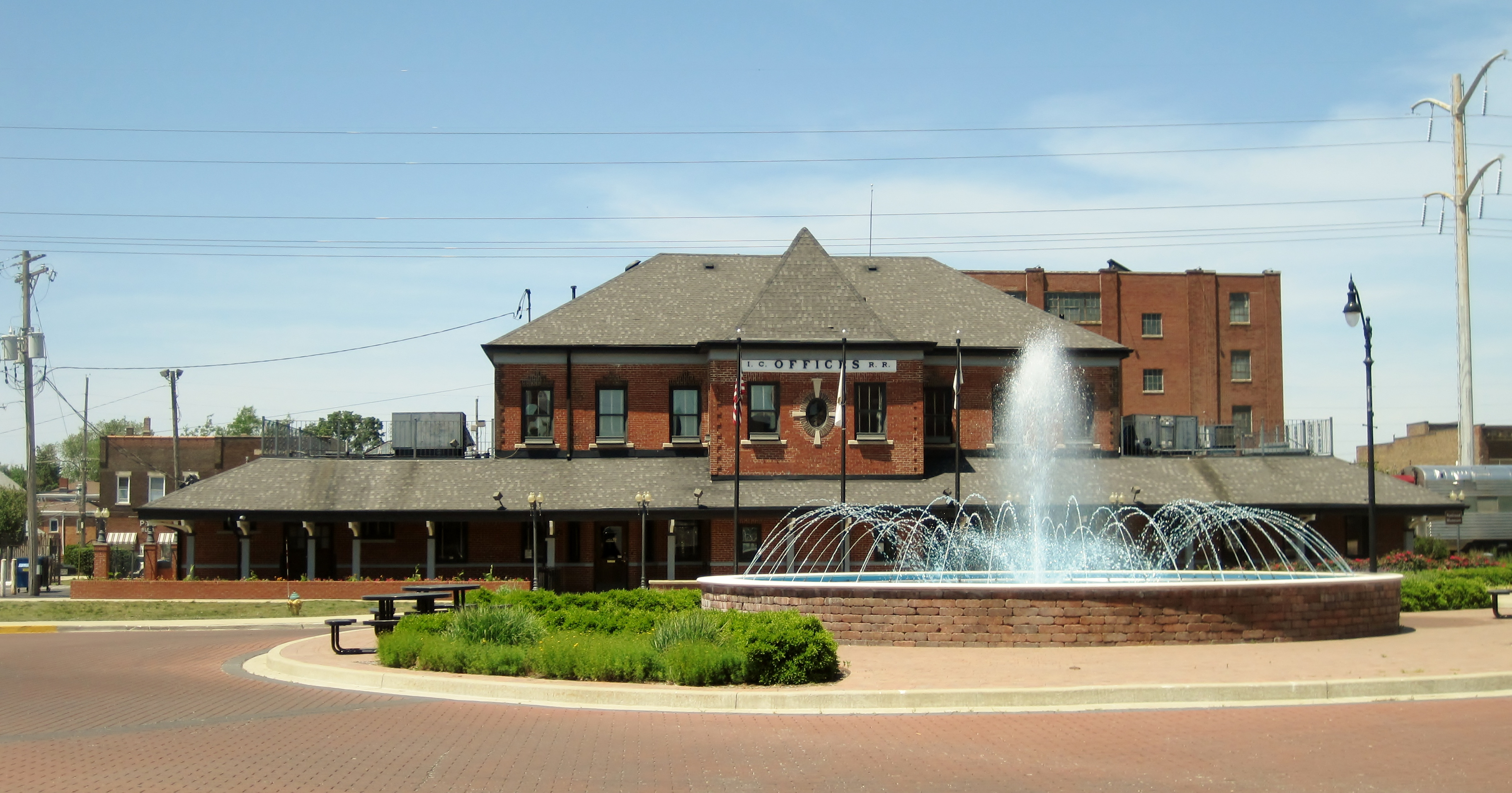

General information
- Location: 199 South East Avenue; Kankakee, Illinois; United States
- Owner: City of Kankakee
- Line: CN Chicago Subdivision
- Platforms: 1 side platform
- Tracks: 1
- Connections: River Valley Metro; SHOW Bus (dial-a-ride)

Other information
- Status: Regular stop (Illini/Saluki); Flag stop (City of New Orleans)
- Station code: Amtrak: KKI

History
- Opened: 1898; 128 years ago

Passengers
- FY 2025: 18,244 (Amtrak)

Services
Preceding station	Amtrak	Following station
Champaign–Urbana toward New Orleans	City of New Orleans	Homewood toward Chicago
Gilman toward Carbondale	Illini and Saluki	Homewood toward Chicago
Former services
Preceding station	Illinois Central Railroad	Following station
Otto toward New Orleans	Main Line	Bradley toward Chicago
- Illinois Central Railroad Depot
- U.S. National Register of Historic Places
- Interactive map of Illinois Central Railroad Depot
- Location: Kankakee, Illinois, USA
- Coordinates: 41°7′9.48″N 87°51′56.16″W
- Built: 1898
- NRHP reference No.: 00000409
- Added to NRHP: April 28, 2000
Location

Kankakee station is an Amtrak intercity train station in Kankakee, Illinois, United States. The station is a regular stop for the Illini and Saluki, and is a flag stop for the City of New Orleans, served only when passengers have tickets to and from the station. The present station was built by the Illinois Central Railroad in 1897.

== History ==
The Illinois Central Railroad Company was founded in 1851. By 1853, newly founded Kankakee was connected Chicago, 56 miles (90 km) away. The first train pulled into the station on July 11, 1853. The rail connection reduced the travel time between the two cities from six days by wagon to three hours by rail. It also provided Kankakee with access to industrial resources in the north–south direction; the city was no longer dependent on the east–west Kankakee River. Kankakee was incorporated two years later.

The original station was a small, wood-framed station. However, by the 1890s, it had fallen into disrepair and no longer conformed to city ordinances. The Illinois Central agreed to commission a new train station in 1897, which was completed the next year. The first train arrived at the new station at 7:30 a.m. on January 10, 1898. Frank Lloyd Wright traveled through the station on several occasions while designing two houses in Kankakee, remarking of the new building, "not a style of my choosing but good enough for the community." The city was also served by the New York Central Railroad at another station, with trains such as the James Whitcomb Riley, bound for Cincinnati.

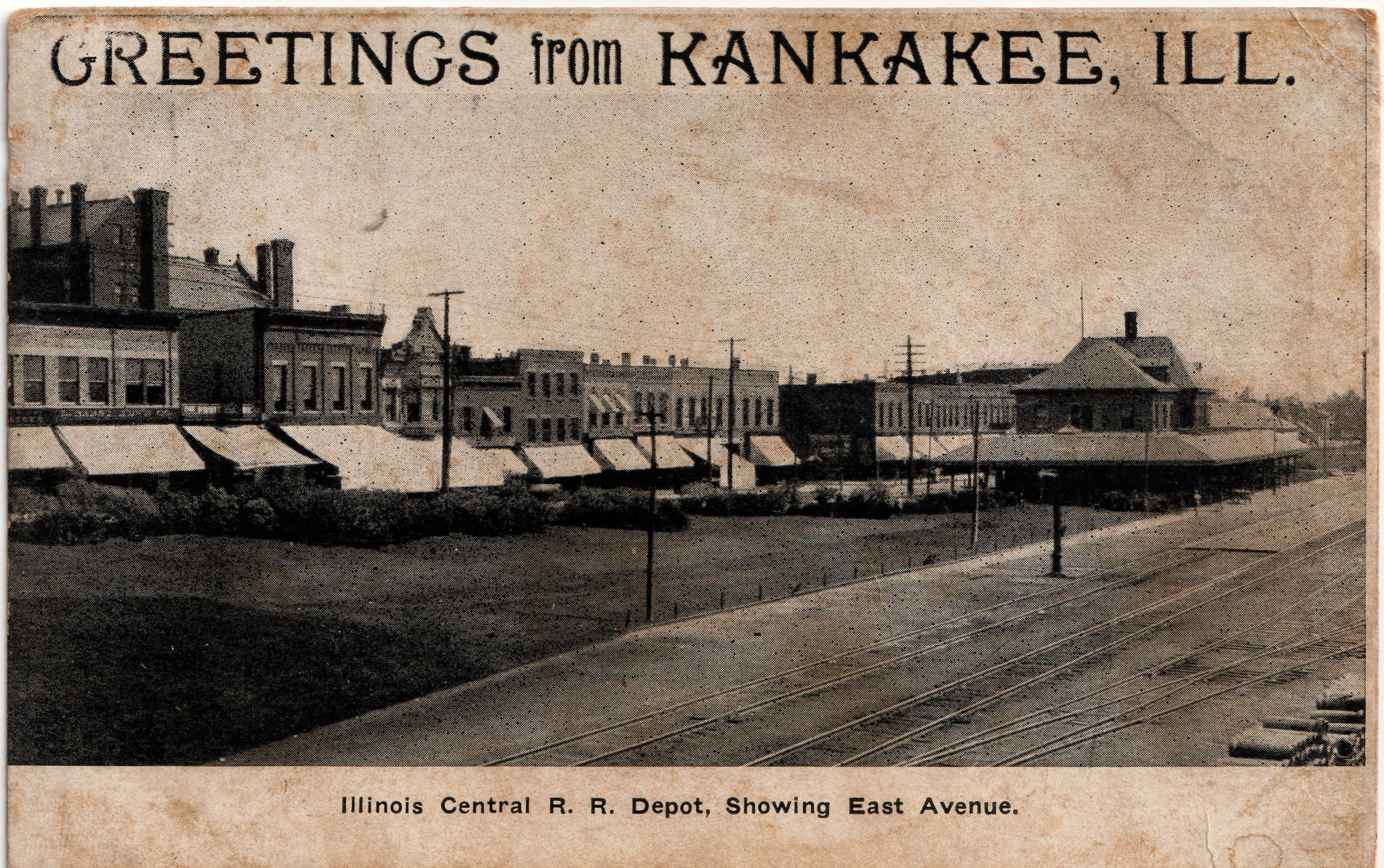
Illinois Central RR Depot, Showing East Avenue, Kankakee, Illinois in about 1909

Telephones were installed in 1902, replacing the original telegraph wires. These lines were moved underground in 1911. Rail use declined in the 1930s, coinciding with the Great Depression and the increased use of automobiles. Furthermore, the Kankakee Electric Railway Company, which provided interurban service to the station, went out of business in 1933. The station saw a resurgence in the 1940s during World War II, when personnel training at Chanute Field in Rantoul would come to Kankakee on leisure time. The station has remained in continuous use since 1898.

== Historical services ==
Historically, the station served trains on the Illinois Central's routes going southwest, south and southeast. The last of these, aside from the City of New Orleans, Illini and Saluki was the South Wind.

to St. Louis:

- Green Diamond

to New Orleans:

- City of New Orleans
- Panama Limited

to Florida:

- Seminole
- South Wind

== Disposition today ==
The station has been on the National Register of Historic Places since the year 2000. By the late 1980s, the depot had fallen into disrepair. The city purchased the building from the Illinois Central in 1990 and finished a full restoration eight years later. The $1 million project was funded with $750,000 in city funds and private donations. Today, the northern end of the station is home of the Kankakee Railroad Museum.

== In popular culture ==
In Steve Goodman's song "City of New Orleans" (popularized by Arlo Guthrie) the train departs the Kankakee station.

== Bus Connections ==
River Valley Metro: – Routes 1, 7, & 8
