= Rantoul station =

Amtrak intercity train station in Rantoul, Illinois

Rantoul, IL
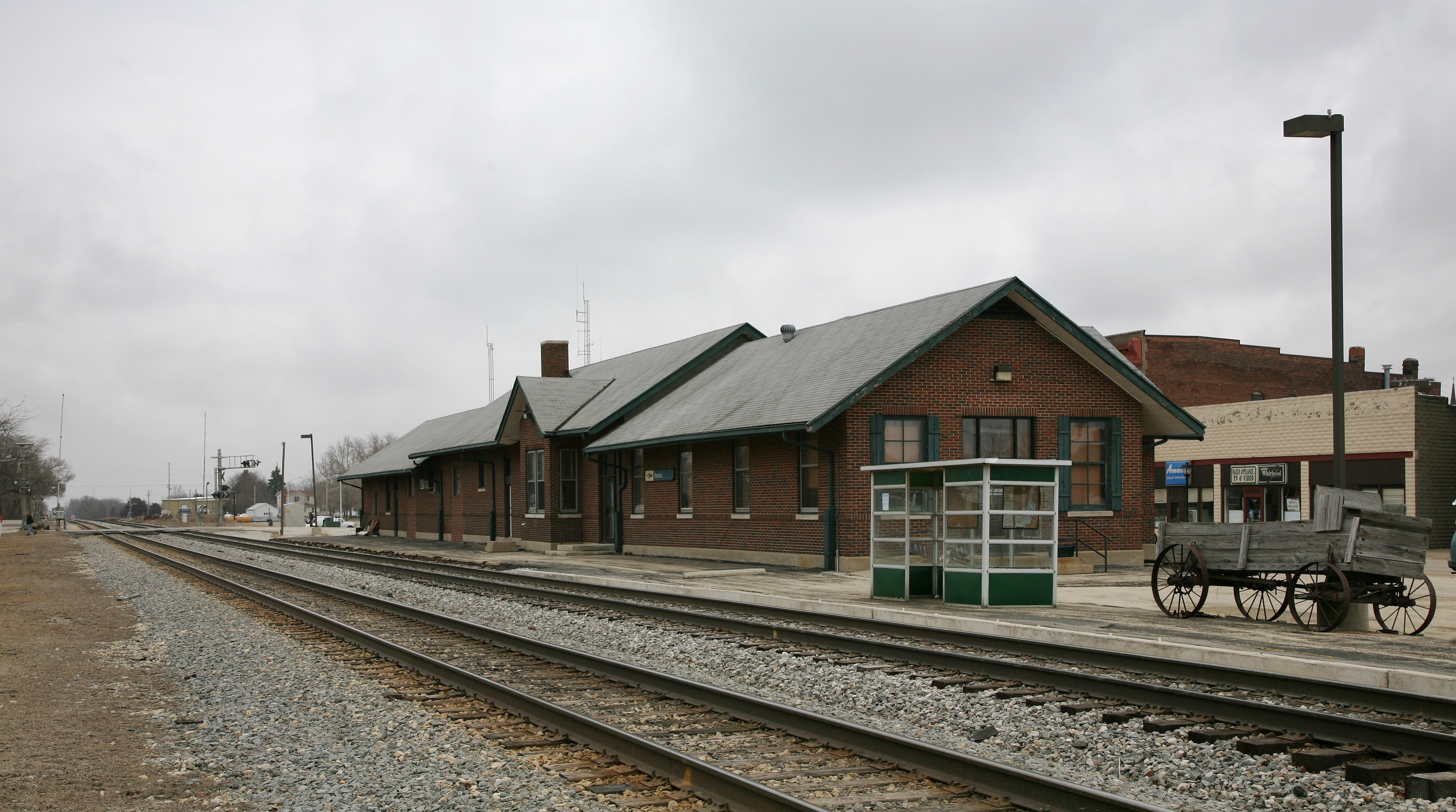

General information
- Location: East Grove and North Kentucky Avenues; Rantoul, Illinois; United States
- Coordinates: 40°18′43″N 88°9′32″W
- Owner: Amtrak
- Line: CN Chicago Subdivision
- Platforms: 1 side platform
- Tracks: 2
- Bus operators: C-CARTS

Other information
- Station code: Amtrak: RTL

History
- Rebuilt: March–October 30, 1941

Passengers
- 2018: 4,999 ▲4.73%
- FY 2025: 5,865 (Amtrak)

Services
Preceding station	Amtrak	Following station
Champaign–Urbana toward Carbondale	Illini and Saluki	Gilman toward Chicago
City of New Orleans does not stop here
Former services
Preceding station	Amtrak	Following station
Champaign–Urbana Terminus	Campus 1971–1972	Homewood toward Chicago–Central
Preceding station	Illinois Central Railroad	Following station
Thomasboro toward New Orleans	Main Line	Ludlow toward Chicago
Dewey toward Le Roy	Rantoul District	Gifford toward West Lebanon
Location

Rantoul station is an Amtrak intercity train station in Rantoul, Illinois, United States, on their Illini and Saluki service. It was originally built by the Illinois Central Railroad. The City of New Orleans also uses these tracks, but does not stop.
