= River Valley Metro Mass Transit District =

Bus operator in Illinois, United States

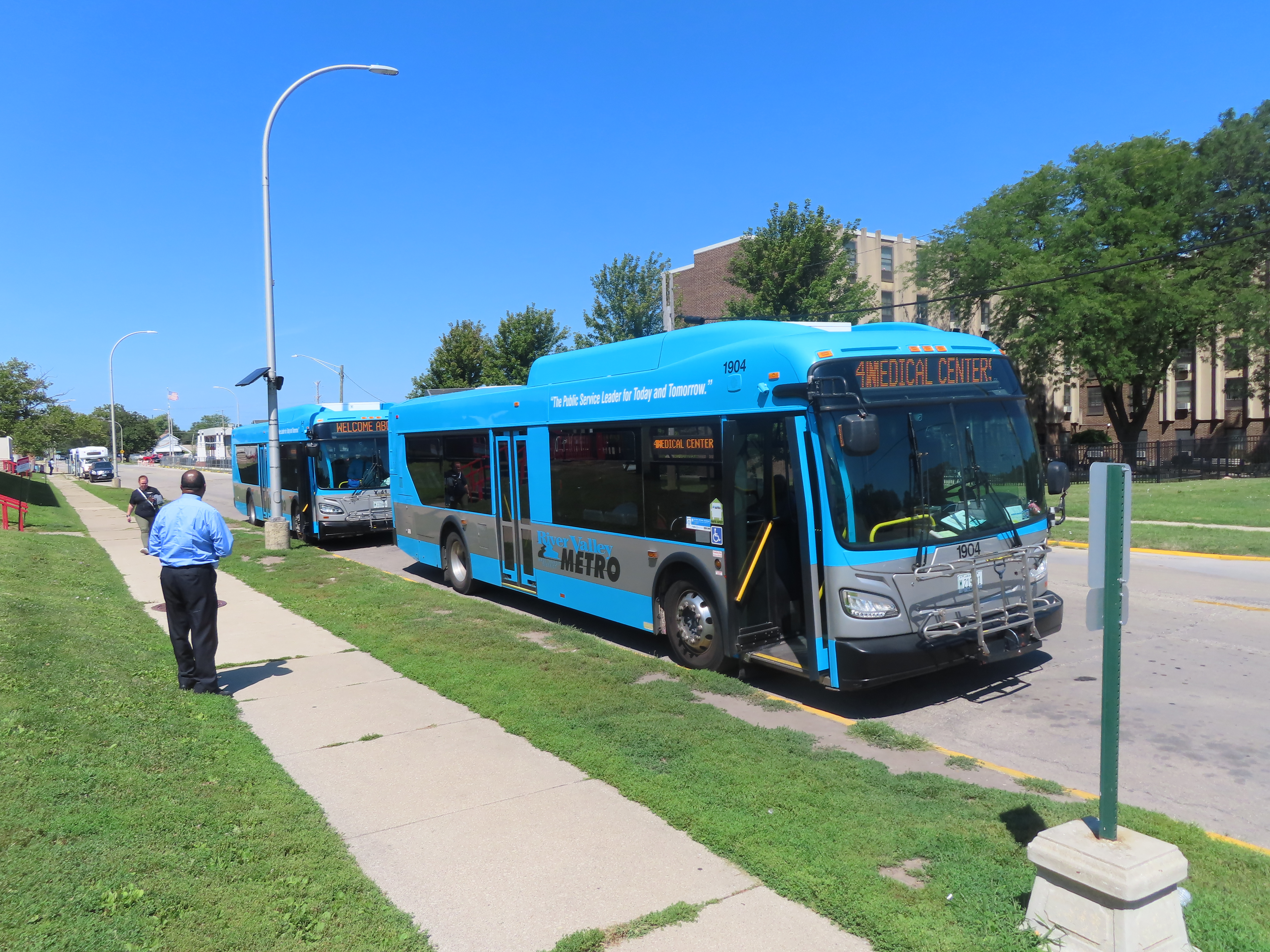
- A River Valley Metro bus in 2022
- Founded: September 1998
- Headquarters: 1137 E. 5000N Road, Bourbonnais, Illinois
- Locale: Kankakee County
- Service area: Kankakee County
- Service type: Bus
- Routes: 13 bus 1 commuter bus
- Stops: 350+
- Hubs: 4 (transfer centers)
- Depots: Metro Centre, 1137 E. 5000N Road, Bourbonnais, IL
- Fleet: 25 (bus)
- Fuel type: Diesel, Gasoline
- Operator: River Valley Metro Mass Transit District
- Chairman: Mark Argyelan
- Website: rivervalleymetro.com

The River Valley Metro Mass Transit District (RVMMTD; River Valley Metro or METRO, for short) is a transit agency that operates buses serving Kankakee County, Illinois, and the surrounding areas.

== History ==
Founded in 1998 and operational by 1999, River Valley Metro Mass Transit District took over the Kankakee Area Transit System (KATS) and became a means of transportation in the region. RVMMTD has 11 local fixed routes, 2 commuter routes, and ADA buses serving the communities of Bradley, Bourbonnais, Kankakee, Aroma Park and Manteno. The agency has also received many awards including, Metro Magazine's "Fastest Growing Transit System" in North America for 2001 and "Success in Enhancing Ridership Award" from the Federal Transit Administration in 2008 and 2009.

== Renovation and expansion plans ==
After studying a number of proposals for improving bus service, River Valley Metro added more daily trips to Midway Airport and made significant changes to local routes and schedules in 2017.

== Kankakee Transfer Center Upgrade ==
The need for an upgrade of the current Kankakee Transfer Center, or Kankakee Metro CENTRE, has been noted since 2010. Preliminary work has begun with an estimated completion in 2022.

== Routes ==
River Valley Metro operates 13 fixed-regular bus routes and 1 commuter route. The Midway Airport route was added in 2014 and the University Park Metra train station commuter route was added in 2008; however, the University Park service has since been suspended.

=== Local ===
- 1 Meadowview
- 2 Bradley/Meijer/Target
- 3 Schuyler/Meijer/WalMart
- 4 Court Street
- 5 Aroma Park
- 6 Indian/Harrison/Del Monte
- 7 Walmart/KCC/Del Monte
- 8 East Kankakee / KHS
- 9 Manteno
- 10 Bourbonnais / VA
- 11 Kennedy Dr. / ONU
- 12 Kennedy Dr. / Christine Dr. / Bourbonnais
- 14 Mulberry / Eagle / Station / Kankakee High School

=== Commuter ===
- Midway
- University Park Metra Station — *service suspended*

== Transfer Centers ==
There are four transfer centers in the River Valley Metro bus system, which are:

- Kankakee Transfer Center in Kankakee. Routes served are: 1, 3, 4, 5, 6, 7, 8 and 11
- Northfield Square Mall Transfer Center in Bradley. Routes served are: 2, 3, 9, 10 and 11
- Metro Centre Transfer Center in Bourbonnais. Routes served are: 10 and the Midway Commuter
- Manteno Metro Centre Transfer Center in Manteno. Routes served are: 9 and the Midway Commuter

The University Park Metra Commuter route, which previously served the Bourbonnais and Manteno transfer centers, has been suspended.

== Fares ==
Service Type	Fare
Local Bus Single Ride	$1.00
Local Bus Single Ride - Reduced*	$0.50
Local Bus Single Ride - 5 & younger/Benefit Access Program	$0.00
Midway	$2.00
Midway - Reduced*	$1.00
Midway - 5 & younger	$0.00
Monthly Pass	$30
Monthly Pass - Student	$20
Monthly Pass - Reduced*	$15
Monthly Pass - All Inclusive**	$40
20 Ride Pass	$20

* Reduced fares are applicable on bus for seniors and riders with disabilities.
** All inclusive passes include access to any bus in the system, including University Park and Metro PLUS (ADA).

As of January 2024

== Fixed route bus ridership ==
The ridership statistics shown here are of fixed route services only and do not include demand response.

== See also ==
- List of bus transit systems in the United States
- Metra Electric District
- Kankakee station
