= Illinois Terminal =

American passenger transport center

Illinois Terminal Champaign–Urbana, IL
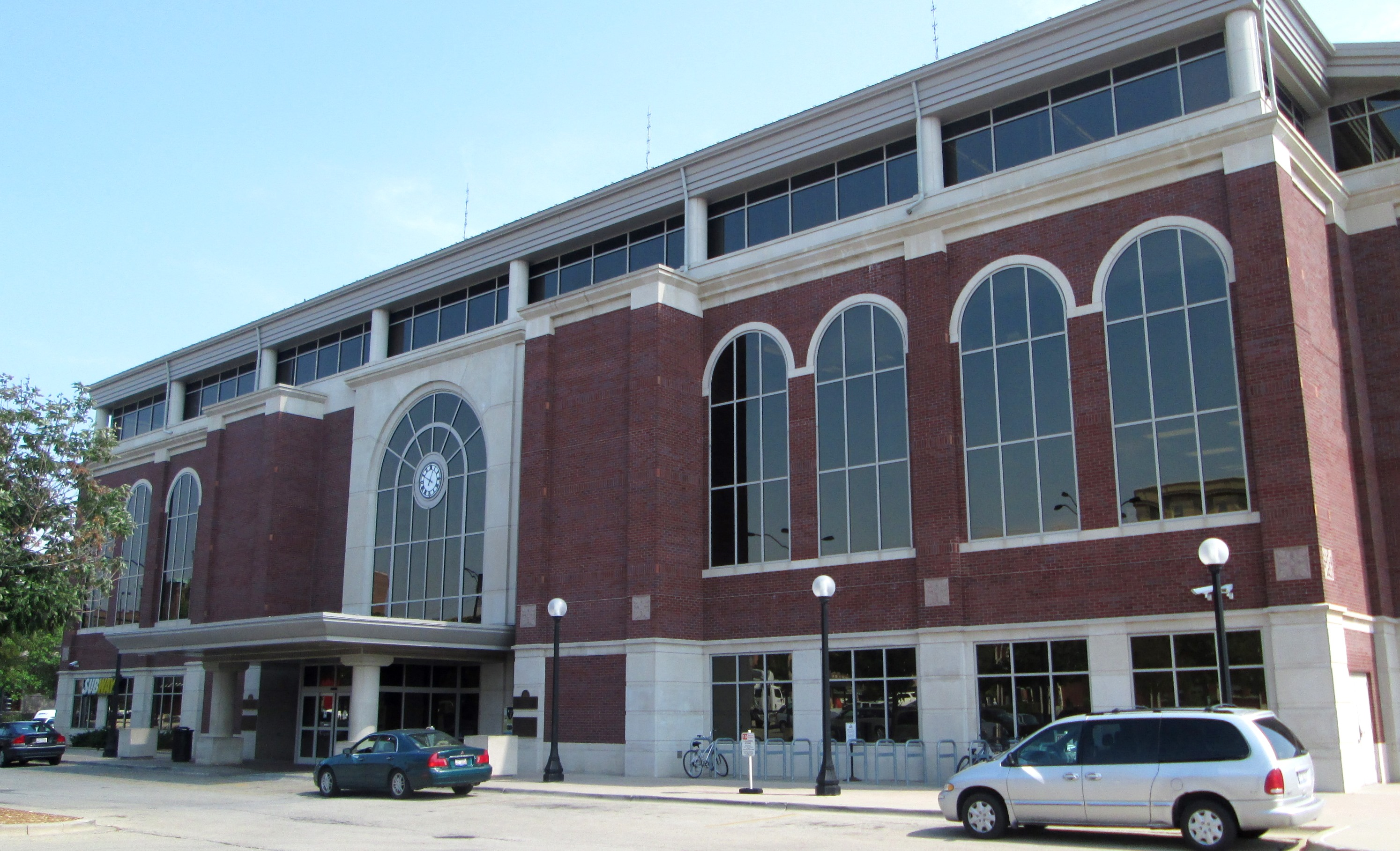
- Illinois Terminal in 2013

General information
- Location: 45 East University Avenue; Champaign, Illinois; United States
- Coordinates: 40°06′57″N 88°14′28″W
- Owner: Champaign–Urbana Mass Transit District (building); Canadian National Railway (platform and tracks)
- Line: CN Champaign Subdivision
- Platforms: 1 side platform
- Tracks: 1
- Train operators: Amtrak
- Bus stands: 10
- Bus operators: Champaign-Urbana MTD; C-CARTS; Burlington Trailways; Greyhound Lines; Peoria Charter; Danville Mass Transit

Construction
- Parking: 30 short and 50 long-term spaces
- Cycle facilities: 70 spaces with a bike repair station
- Accessible: Yes

Other information
- Station code: Amtrak: CHM

History
- Opened: 1999; 27 years ago

Passengers
- FY 2025: 254,996 (Amtrak)

Services
Preceding station	Amtrak	Following station
Mattoon toward New Orleans	City of New Orleans	Kankakee toward Chicago
Mattoon toward Carbondale	Illini and Saluki	Rantoul toward Chicago
Former services
Preceding station	Amtrak	Following station
Terminus	Campus 1971–1972	Rantoul toward Chicago–Central
Decatur 1981–1983 Terminus	Illini	Rantoul toward Chicago
Preceding station	Illinois Central Railroad	Following station
Savoy toward New Orleans	Main Line	Leverett toward Chicago
Staleys toward Havana	Champaign - Havana	Terminus
Preceding station	New York Central Railroad	Following station
Rising toward Peoria	Peoria & Eastern Railway	Urbana toward Indianapolis
Location

The Illinois Terminal is an intermodal passenger transport center located at 45 East University Avenue in Champaign, Illinois, United States. The facility opened in January 1999 and provides Amtrak train service and various bus services to the Champaign–Urbana area.

In 2021, the facility had the second-highest ridership in Illinois, behind Chicago Union Station and ahead of Uptown Station in Bloomington, with just over 103,000 passengers serviced.

== Facilities ==
Owned by the Champaign–Urbana Mass Transit District, the building also houses a Subway restaurant and the offices of the Junior League, as well as a school, meeting spaces, and banquet halls. It formerly housed the Champaign office for Mike Frerichs when he represented Champaign-Urbana in the Illinois Senate.

Illinois Terminal was built with funds provided by the Federal Transit Administration, Illinois Department of Transportation, the Champaign-Urbana Mass Transit District and the city of Champaign, and was named for the Illinois Terminal Railroad, an electric interurban line that ran from Champaign, and at one time extended as far as St. Louis. The track and platforms of the Illinois Terminal are owned by the Canadian National Railway, which acquired the Illinois Central Railroad in 1999. Previously, trains stopped at the Illinois Central Railroad Depot, built in 1925 across University Avenue from the site of the current station. The previous 1899 station still stands, further up the line a few blocks.

There is a short term parking lot in front of the building with long term parking available off Water Street east of the tracks.

== Services ==
The facility is used by the following transportation companies:

- Amtrak (second floor)
- Burlington Trailways
- Champaign–Urbana Mass Transit District
- Greyhound Lines
- Peoria Charter
- Danville Mass Transit
