= Champaign–Urbana Mass Transit District =

Mass transit system in Illinois, US

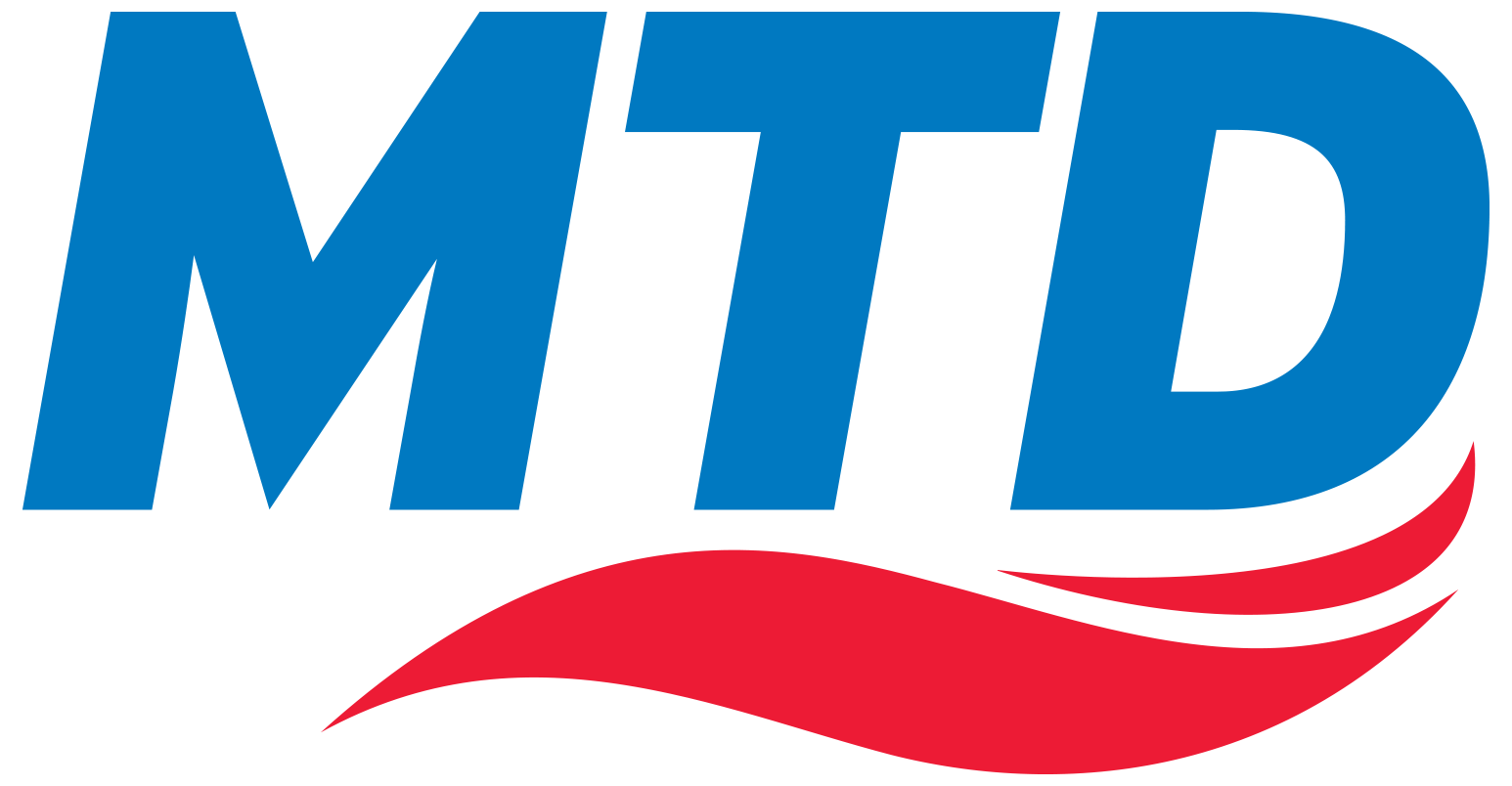

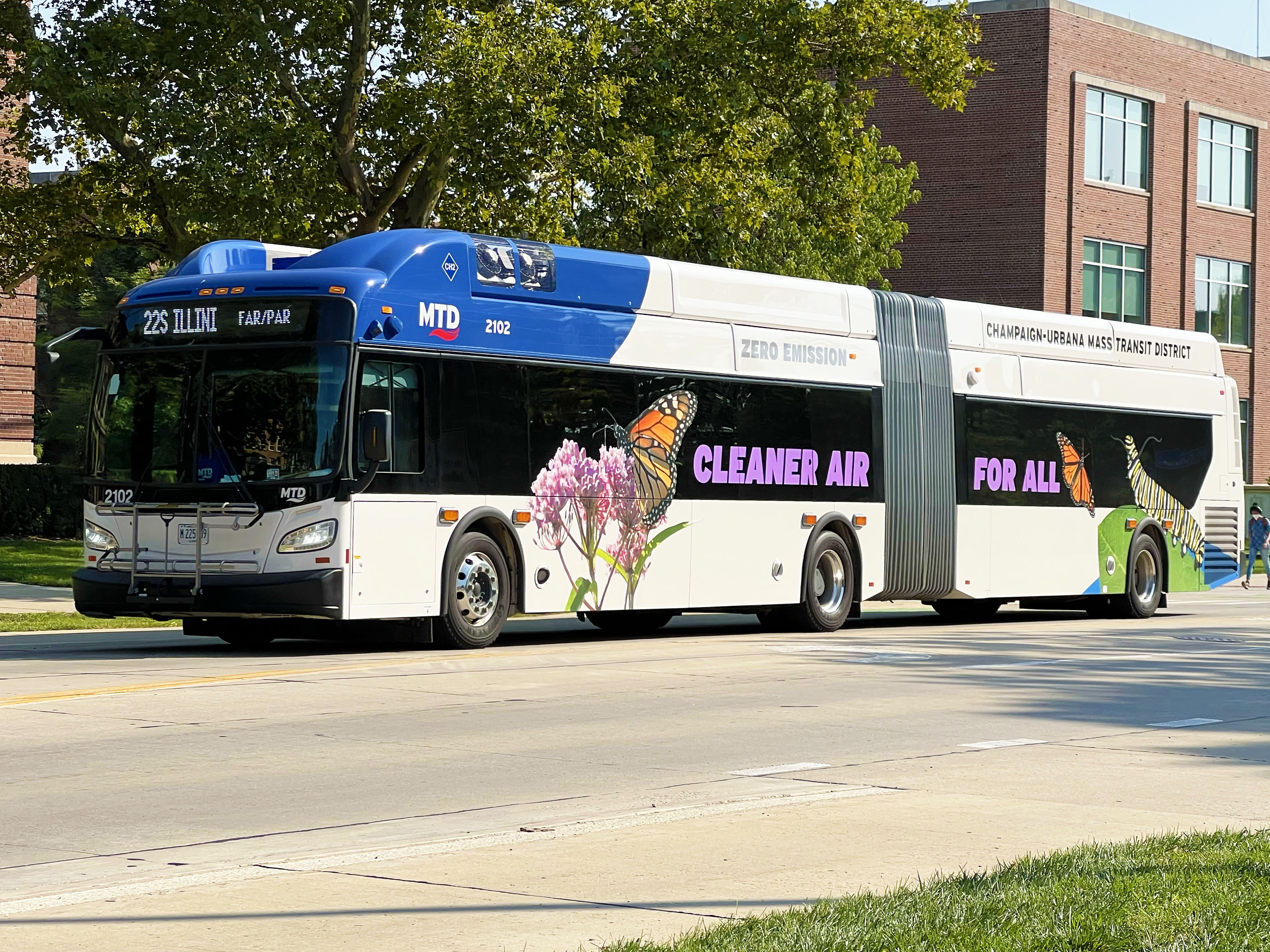
- One of MTD's new New Flyer hydrogen fuel-cell buses
- Founded: December 15, 1970
- Commenced operation: August 2, 1971
- Headquarters: 1101 E. University Ave Urbana, Illinois 61802
- Service area: Champaign; Urbana; Savoy
- Service type: Bus service; Paratransit
- Hubs: Illinois Terminal
- Fleet: 128 buses
- Daily ridership: 46,800 (weekdays, Q1 2026)
- Annual ridership: 11,661,600 (2025)
- Fuel type: Diesel; Diesel-electric; Hydrogen Fuel Cell
- Chief executive: Karl Gnadt
- Annual budget: $43,232,000 operating budget; $16,675,700 capital budget (FY2021)
- Employees: 377
- Website: mtd.org

The Champaign–Urbana Mass Transit District (colloquially known as the MTD or CUMTD) is a mass transit system that serves the Champaign–Urbana metropolitan area in central-eastern Illinois. MTD is headquartered in Urbana and operates its primary hub at the intermodal Illinois Terminal in downtown Champaign. In 2025, the system had a ridership of 11,661,600, or about 46,800 per weekday as of the first quarter of 2026.

At the University of Illinois Urbana–Champaign, which lies within the District, all students pay a $70 transportation fee every semester in exchange for unlimited use of the bus services. Primarily funded by property taxes, MTD currently levies about 28 cents of property taxes per $100 of assessed valuation; bus fares are another primary source of funding. MTD is led by a seven-member Board of Trustees, who are appointed by the Champaign County Board. Buses are produced by the Canadian company New Flyer and the American company Gillig. MTD introduced hybrid buses to its fleet in Fall 2009, and currently the vast majority of its buses are hybrid. Minibuses used for paratransit service, SafeRides service, and (occasionally) fixed route service, are cutaway vans with a Ford E series chassis.

== Public transit before the MTD ==
In 1854, the first rail lines in the region were laid 2 miles west of Urbana by the Illinois Central Railroad. The city of Urbana initially wanted nothing to do with the new railroad economy, so a new city, originally named West Urbana, was created to help serve the needs of the railroad. In 1860 West Urbana was renamed Champaign, and subsequently developed into an important railroad town. The station served as a stopover on the way from New Orleans to Chicago, and vice versa. In 1909 this was expanded to also include service from Chicago to Jacksonville, Florida.

The first trolley service in the area was established in 1863, when the Urbana Railroad Company was created to link Urbana and Champaign. These first trolleys were drawn by horses or mules. By 1890, work had begun on an electrified trolley system under the auspices of William B. McKinley. At its peak, this system had as many as 20 routes, including a nighttime "Owl Service" linking Champaign and Urbana.

Interurban streetcar service was also supplied to the area (and indeed to much of Illinois) by the Illinois Terminal Railroad Company, another brainchild of William McKinley. McKinley's scheme of selling electricity from the interurban system to the surrounding towns led to the founding of the Illinois Power and Light Company.

In 1901, the Illinois Motor Transit Company introduced a city bus system to the region, but they went bankrupt within the year. However, the inability of the trolley system to lay enough track to fully serve the area prompted the 1925 addition of another bus system by National City Bus Lines, a subsidiary of General Motors. In 1936, as was happening in other places across the nation, National City Bus Lines purchased the trolley system from the Illinois Power and Light Company and dismantled it. The last trolley operated on 10 November 1936. Within one month bus lines had become the dominant form of transportation in the city under the new name "Champaign–Urbana City Lines."

Ridership on the Champaign–Urbana City Lines was high, reaching 1 million passengers served in 1958. Like most of America however, buses in Champaign–Urbana became less popular with the advent of affordable automobiles. On November 17, 1970, P.E. Cherry, the manager of Champaign–Urbana City Lines, published an article in the Courier stating that declining ridership, aging buses, and a rising deficit would force the line to close. The Illinois Commerce Commission conducted a hearing on the petition to close the city lines and suggested that rather than close the lines, a referendum should be drafted to create a mass transit district.

== History of the modern MTD ==
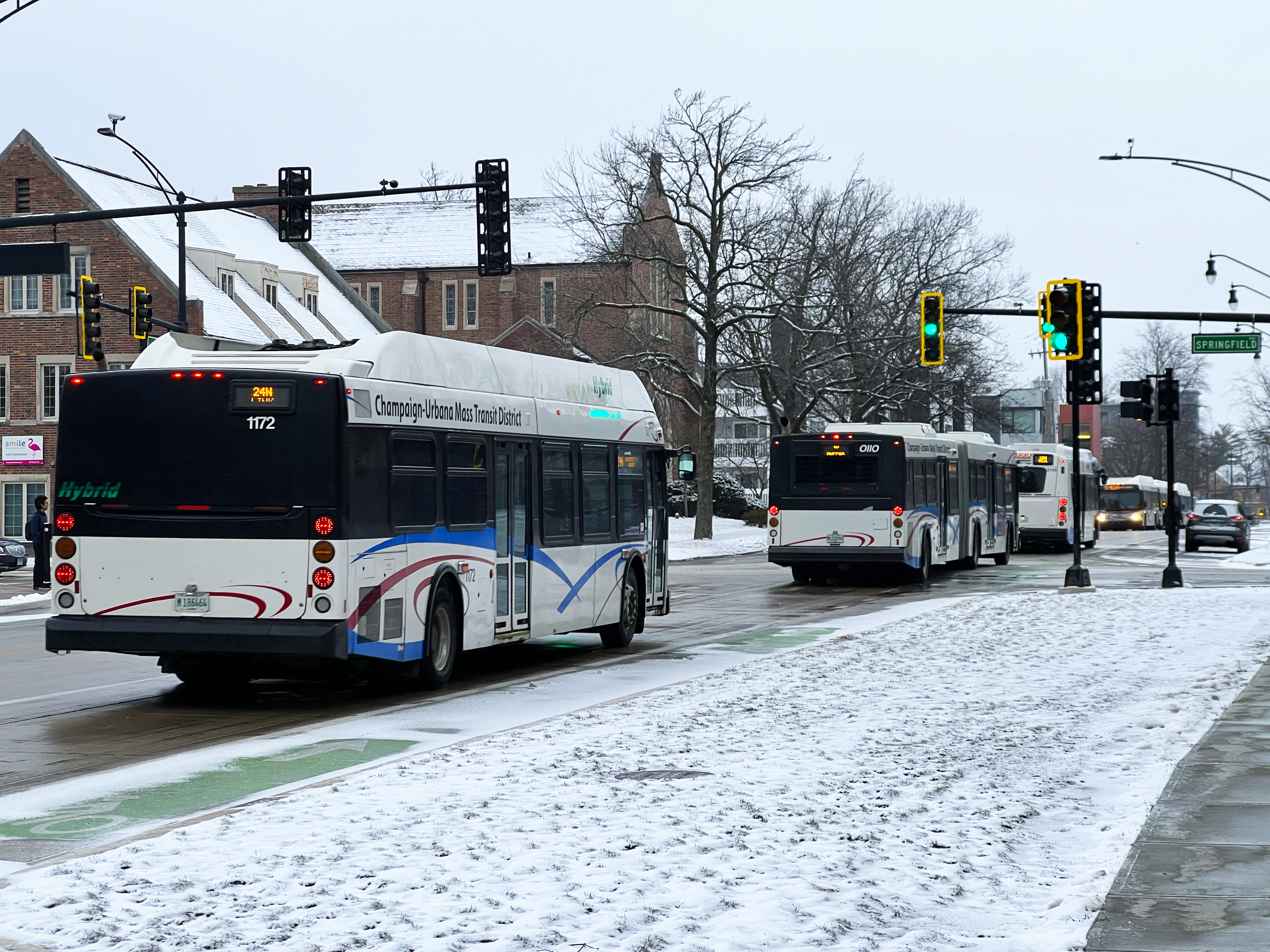
MTD Buses on Wright Street, with 2001 Diesel D60LF, 2011 Diesel-Electric Low Floor DE40LFR, and 2021 Diesel Electric Xcelsior XDE40.

On November 24, 1970, a mere week after the lines looked to be closing, the referendum was approved and Thomas Evans was appointed the director of the new mass transit district. The new MTD began operation on August 2, 1971, for a fee of $0.30 per ride with free transfers on buses which allowed one to navigate the area using several different bus lines. On May 13, 1971, a federal grant was procured to help this both fledgling and historic transit district rework its fleet of buses, purchasing fifteen new buses and ten used buses from Peoria, Illinois. In 1973, the MTD expanded its routes to include the university, offering routes around the university and to the graduate housing complex. Fees for University students were at a reduced rate, paying only $0.10 per ride, or purchasing a $20 semester pass for unlimited rides.

In 1984, MTD received national recognition when it was chosen as the 7th best transportation system in America, outranking the systems provided by many larger cities across the country. In 1986 and 1994, it was the recipient of the American Public Transit Association's Outstanding Achievement Award. In 2026, Champaign-Urbana was named by Travel + Leisure as the U.S. city, excluding New York City, with the best public transportation system.

In 1993, MTD introduced low-floor buses to its fleet with an order of 15 New Flyer D40LF buses. MTD was one of the first transit agencies in the United States to introduce low-floor buses. In 1994, MTD introduced articulated buses to its fleet, by purchasing 13 second-hand Crown-Ikarus 286 buses from Transit Authority of River City of Louisville, Kentucky. These buses were replaced by newly purchased New Flyer D60LF articulated buses in 2001-2002.

In 1999, Illinois Terminal was created in downtown Champaign which serves as both a transit hub for the MTD and a connection between the MTD, Amtrak and intercity bus lines.

In 2001, MTD purchased its first new articulated buses, with an order of 12 New Flyer D60LF buses (retired in 2023). In 2009, MTD introduced hybrid electric buses with the introduction of five Gillig BRT 30' midibuses (retired in 2021) and four New Flyer DE60LFR articulated buses (retired in 2024).

In fall 2021, MTD introduced hydrogen fuel cell buses to its fleet, with two New Flyer XHE60 articulated buses. This represents the first commercial order for articulated hydrogen buses in the United States. This was followed up by a purchase of ten rigid New Flyer XHE40 hydrogen fuel cell buses in 2023, which are currently being delivered in 2024.

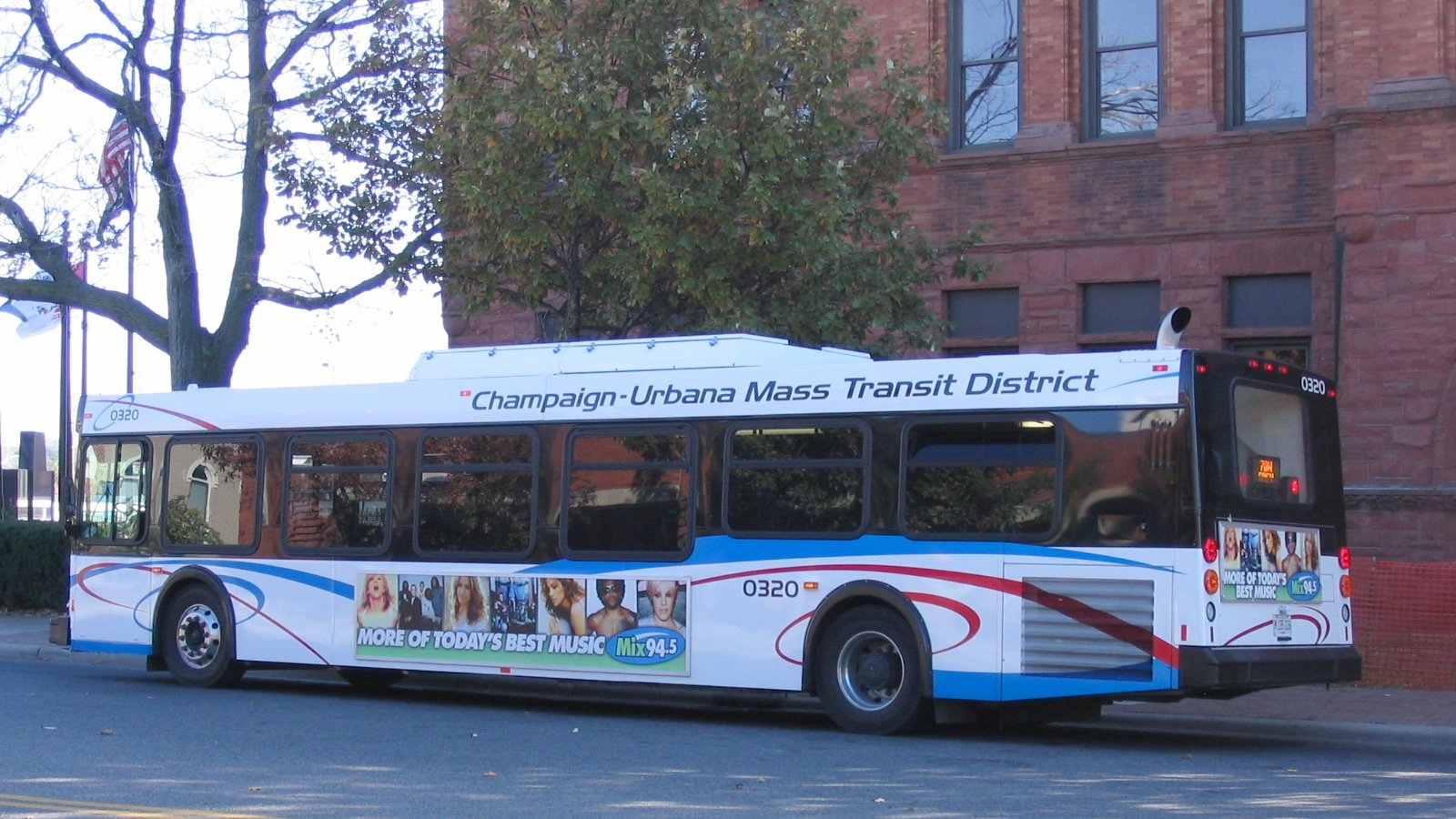
A New Flyer D40LF bus at Lincoln Square (retired in 2020)

Today the MTD provides over 11 million rides per year. The current one-way bus fare is $1. Transfers are free and may be used to connect with another route at transfer points to complete a one-way trip. An annual bus pass can be purchased for $60. The annual pass allows unlimited rides. An all-day pass, good for either Saturday or Sunday, can be bought for $2. All University of Illinois students, faculty, and staff have unlimited access to all routes and services.

== Accidents ==
=== Fatal accidents ===
Prior to 2004, MTD never had an accident involving a fatality. Since 2004, there have been two fatal accidents involving pedestrians and MTD buses. Both cases involved University of Illinois students on campus:

- Oct. 27, 2004: Carolyn B. Jeffers, a pedestrian, was struck and killed by a 26 Pack bus at the intersection of S Goodwin Ave and Gregory Dr, Urbana.
- Sept. 29, 2005: Sarah Channick, a pedestrian, was struck and killed by a 22 Illini bus at the intersection of S 6th St and E Chalmers St, Champaign. The Channick family sued MTD; the lawsuit was eventually settled for $1.25 million.

After Channick's death, the governments of Champaign and Urbana, the University of Illinois, and MTD conducted the Campus Area Transportation Study (commonly referred to as "CATS"), which made specific recommendations to improve bus safety on campus. As of December 2011, two of three proposed phases had been implemented.

=== Bus vs. pedestrian accidents ===
- Nov. 4, 2024: An MTD bus hit a pedestrian in the roadway at the intersection of Wright Street and University Avenue. The pedestrian sustained non-life-threatening injuries and was transported to the hospital. Champaign police officers cited the bus operator for their role in the collision.
- Sept. 10, 2024: MTD bus 1185 operating a 12 Teal run collided with a University of Illinois student riding an electric scooter near the intersection of Goodwin Avenue and Nevada Street in Urbana. Urbana Police Department Lieutenant Cory Koker told The Daily Illini that the student riding the scooter improperly entered into a crosswalk in front of the bus and subsequently “collided with the bumper of the bus.” The student reportedly sustained only minor injuries.
- May 6, 2024: A pedestrian sustained minor injuries when he was hit by an MTD bus at the intersection of Main and Neil streets in Champaign. The man reportedly stepped off of a curb and walked in front of the bus when he was struck.
- Jan. 30, 2023: An MTD bus and a cyclist were involved in an accident at the intersection of Wright and Chalmers streets on the University of Illinois campus. The cyclist was transported to the hospital to be treated for a leg injury. Two weeks later, the MTD asserted that its bus “was operating safely” and did not cause the crash.
- Feb. 25, 2015: An MTD bus making a right-hand turn from Logan Street onto S. Walnut Street struck pedestrian Patricia J. Marxmiller as she was walking in a crosswalk on her way to work at the Christie Clinic. The bus rolled over her and dragged her for 14 feet before stopping. Her injuries required immediate amputation of her left leg. Later, her right leg was also amputated. She went on to sue the District and bus operator Seth Stevens for damages. Marxmiller later dropped the case against Stevens, who had a history of accidents while working for MTD. In her case against MTD, a Champaign County jury awarded Marxmiller $9,422,000 in damages and her husband, Ken Marxmiller, $450,000 for loss of consortium. MTD appealed the verdict to the Illinois Appellate Court's fourth district on the grounds that the jury was given improper instructions. The appeals court ultimately upheld the lower court’s decision.
- Oct. 28, 2014: MTD bus 1346 struck a University of Illinois student at the intersection of First Street and Kirby Avenue. The pedestrian, a University of Illinois student, was pinned under the bus until she was freed by emergency personnel and transported to the hospital.

=== Bus vs. vehicle accidents ===
- Sept. 8, 2025: MTD bus 1348 operating route 2C Red ended up swerving off the road while driving down E. Green Street in Urbana. The driver of an SUV reportedly ran through a stop sign while driving down S. Maple Street, causing both vehicles to serve. As a result, “the bus wound up in a yard of a home near the intersection of South Maple and East Green streets.” Two passengers aboard the bus were transported to the hospital.

== Routes ==
The MTD operates as many as 19 fixed-route services on weekdays.

=== Fixed routes ===
Hopper routes are shortened versions of their parent route that serve the most popular stops on a route, providing additional capacity to its parent route. In the tables below, hopper intervals include stops by hopper runs and parent route runs.

- For example, **1 Yellow** operates on a 30-minute interval, and **1 Yellow Hopper** operates on a 10-minute interval.
- In one hour, two Yellow busses and four Yellow Hoppers will serve each stop along the Yellow Hopper’s route.

Directions (noted in italics in tables below)

- Routes are typically divided into north/south or west/east runs. For these routes, runs are labeled with a cardinal direction.
  - Example: **4E Blue** or **22N Illini Limited**
- The **9 Brown** and **16 Pink** routes travel in a loop, with one run going clockwise (A) and the other going counter-clockwise (B).
  - Example: **9A Brown** (clockwise from Parkland College, to Illinois Terminal, to Transit Plaza, to Secretary of State, then back to Parkland College)
- The **21 Raven** only operates in one direction and does not have a letter next to its route number.

UI days are weekdays when the University of Illinois is in session. Non-UI days are weekdays during University of Illinois’ fall, winter, spring, and summer breaks. These routes have reduced service during Non-UI days:

- **1 Yellow Hopper** (does not run)
- **12 Teal** (reduced service)
- **13 Silver** (reduced service)
- **22 Illini** (replaced with 22 Illini Limited)Note: The “Major streets traveled” column in the below tables follow this format to reflect non-parent-route services:
- **Bold** — Streets served by hopper routes (1 Yellow, 5 Green, 6 Orange, and 10 Gold hoppers) and 22 Illini Limited
- Italic — Streets served on a limited basis

==== Weekday ====
Weekday Day
Route		Termini			Major streets traveled	Interval
Route		North/West		South/East	Major streets traveled	Interval
1	**Yellow**	N: North to **Champaign Walmart**	↔	S: South to **Savoy Walmart**	Prospect Ave; Town Center Blvd; Marketview Dr; Mercury Dr / Apollo Dr (1N Yellow Apollo only); Market St; Bradley Ave; Columbia Ave; **White St via Illinois Terminal**; **Wright St via Transit Plaza**; **Gregory Dr via Ikenberry Commons**; **First St via Lot E-14**; Fox Dr; Curtis Rd; First St; Church St	30 minutes
1	**Yellow Apollo** (Limited)	N: North to **Champaign Walmart**	↔	S: South to **Savoy Walmart**	Prospect Ave; Town Center Blvd; Marketview Dr; Mercury Dr / Apollo Dr (1N Yellow Apollo only); Market St; Bradley Ave; Columbia Ave; **White St via Illinois Terminal**; **Wright St via Transit Plaza**; **Gregory Dr via Ikenberry Commons**; **First St via Lot E-14**; Fox Dr; Curtis Rd; First St; Church St	90 minutes: From 8:20 am to 5:20 pm; **1N Yellow Apollo** diverts to Apollo Subdivision at **Mercury & Apollo** then continues on to **Champaign Walmart**
1	**Yellow Hopper** (UI days)	N: North to **Illinois Terminal**	↔	S: South to **Lot E-14**	Prospect Ave; Town Center Blvd; Marketview Dr; Mercury Dr / Apollo Dr (1N Yellow Apollo only); Market St; Bradley Ave; Columbia Ave; **White St via Illinois Terminal**; **Wright St via Transit Plaza**; **Gregory Dr via Ikenberry Commons**; **First St via Lot E-14**; Fox Dr; Curtis Rd; First St; Church St	10 minutes: UI fall and spring semesters only
2	**Red**	C: Champaign to **Champaign Walmart**	↔	U: Urbana to **Lincoln Square**	Interstate Dr via Champaign Walmart; Neil St; Main St via Illinois Terminal; White St; Green St via Illini Union; Goodwin Ave; Lincoln Ave; Philo Rd via Meijer Urbana and Sunnycrest; Cottage Grove Ave; Main St via Lincoln Square	30 minutes
3	**Lavender**	N: North to **Champaign Walmart** or **Interstate & Research**	↔	S: South to **Illinois Terminal**	Newton Dr; Boardwalk Dr; Anthony Dr; Queens Way; Mattis Ave; Paula Dr; Bloomington Rd; Harris Ave; Vine St; Randolph St (northbound) / State St (southbound); Church St via Illinois Terminal	30 minutes
4	**Blue**	W: West to **Round Barn Road**	↔	E: East to **Illinois Terminal**	Crescent Dr; Mattis Ave; John St; Randolph St (eastbound) / State St (westbound); Stadium Dr; Peabody Dr; Wright St via Transit Plaza; University Ave	30–40 minutes
5	**Green**	W: West to **Round Barn Road**	↔	E: East to **Main & Brady** or **Florida & Philo**	Kenwood Td, Westfield Dr (westbound); Maplepark Dr, John St (eastbound); Springfield Ave via Country Fair; **Randolph St (westbound) / State St (westbound)**; **Neil St via Illinois Terminal**; **Green St via Illini Union**; **Vine St via Lincoln Square**; **Fairlawn Dr, Pennsylvania Ave**; **Florida Ave via Sunnycrest**; Kinch St, Country Squire Dr; Lierman Ave, Main St; Brady Ln, Washington St	30 minutes Buses operate in Washington St & Lierman Ave Loop as follows: Before noon: clockwise; After noon: counter-clockwise
5	**Green Hopper**	W: West to **Parkland College** or **Illinois Terminal**	↔	E: West to **Washington & Lierman** or **Florida & Philo**	Kenwood Td, Westfield Dr (westbound); Maplepark Dr, John St (eastbound); Springfield Ave via Country Fair; **Randolph St (westbound) / State St (westbound)**; **Neil St via Illinois Terminal**; **Green St via Illini Union**; **Vine St via Lincoln Square**; **Fairlawn Dr, Pennsylvania Ave**; **Florida Ave via Sunnycrest**; Kinch St, Country Squire Dr; Lierman Ave, Main St; Brady Ln, Washington St	15 minutes
6	**Orange**	W: West to **Round Barn Road** or **Plastipak**	↔	E: East to **Butzow & Lierman** or **U.S. 150 & Dodson**	Plastipak (Limited service); Round Barn Road via Secretary of State; Country Fair Dr; Church St (westbound only); **University Ave via Illinois Terminal**; **Church St, Park St**; **Broadway Ave via Lincoln Square**; **Vine St**; U.S. Route 150 (Limited service)	30 minutes: Westbound trips terminate at **Butzow & Lierman** between 9:45 am and 2 pm; Serves **U.S. 150 & Dodson** before 9:45 am and after 2:30 pm. (Westbound trips skip **Butzow & Lierman**.); Serves **Plastipak** only at 6:50 am, 7:08 am, 6:35 pm, and 7:10 pm
6	**Orange Hopper**	W: West to **Illinois Terminal**	↔	E: East to **University & Cottage Grove**	Plastipak (Limited service); Round Barn Road via Secretary of State; Country Fair Dr; Church St (westbound only); **University Ave via Illinois Terminal**; **Church St, Park St**; **Broadway Ave via Lincoln Square**; **Vine St**; U.S. Route 150 (Limited service)	15 minutes
7	**Grey**	W: West to **Parkland College**	↔	E: East to **Urbana Walmart**	Bradley Ave, Williamsburg Dr; McKinley Ave, Prospect Ave; Church St (westbound) / University (eastbound) via Illinois Terminal; Second St, Fifth St; Romine St, Wright St; Park St, Fairview Ave, Church St; Broadway Ave, Vine St via Lincoln Square; University Ave via Champaign–Urbana Mass Transit District	30 minutes
8	**Bronze**	W: West to **Illini Union**	↔	E: East to **Lincoln Square**	Green St (Eastbound only); Goodwin Ave (EB only); Orchard St via Orchard Downs; Race St; Vine St; Pennsylvania Ave (Westbound only); Fourth St (WB only); Armory Ave (WB only); Wright St via Transit Plaza (WB only)	30–60 minutes
9	**Brown**	from **Parkland College** to **Parkland College** (loop)	via	A: Clockwise to **Illinois Terminal** then **Transit Plaza** then **Secretary of State**	Bradley Ave; Main St via Illinois Terminal; White St; Wright St via Transit Plaza; St Mary’s Rd; Devonshire Dr; Windsor Rd; Winchester Dr; Crescent Dr; Round Barn Rd via Secretary of State; Duncan Rd; Clayton Blvd	30 minutes
9	**Brown**	from **Parkland College** to **Parkland College** (loop)	via	B: Counter-clockwise to **Secretary of State** then **Transit Plaza** then **Illinois Terminal**	Bradley Ave; Main St via Illinois Terminal; White St; Wright St via Transit Plaza; St Mary’s Rd; Devonshire Dr; Windsor Rd; Winchester Dr; Crescent Dr; Round Barn Rd via Secretary of State; Duncan Rd; Clayton Blvd	30 minutes
10	**Gold**	W: West to **Devonshire & Mayfair**	↔	E: East to **Lincoln Square**	Mattis Ave; Kirby Ave; **First St via Lot E-14**; **Gregory Dr via Main Library**; **Goodwin Ave**; **Springfield Ave via Lincoln Square**; Broadway Ave; Country Club Rd; Kerr Ave	30 minutes
10	**Gold**	W: West to **Lot E-14**	↔	E: East to **Perkins & Eastern**	Mattis Ave; Kirby Ave; **First St via Lot E-14**; **Gregory Dr via Main Library**; **Goodwin Ave**; **Springfield Ave via Lincoln Square**; Broadway Ave; Country Club Rd; Kerr Ave	30 minutes
10	**Gold Hopper**	W: West to **Lot E-14**	↔	E: East to **Lincoln Square**	Mattis Ave; Kirby Ave; **First St via Lot E-14**; **Gregory Dr via Main Library**; **Goodwin Ave**; **Springfield Ave via Lincoln Square**; Broadway Ave; Country Club Rd; Kerr Ave	10 minutes
12	**Teal** (UI days)	W: West to **Illinois Terminal**	↔	E: East to **FAR/PAR** or **Orchard Downs**	White St; Green St via Illini Union; Goodwin Ave via FAR/PAR; Orchard St (Limited service)	10 minutes: U of I days; Every other bus continues to **Orchard Downs**.
12	**Teal** (Non-UI)	W: West to **Illinois Terminal**	↔	E: East to **Orchard Downs**	White St; Green St via Illini Union; Goodwin Ave via FAR/PAR; Orchard St (Limited service)	20 minutes: Non-UI days only
13	**Silver** (UI days)	N: North to **Lincoln Square**	↔	S: South to **FAR/PAR**	Springfield Ave; Green St via Illini Union; Wright St via Transit Plaza; Gregory Dr via Main Library; Lincoln Ave via FAR/PAR	10 minutes: UI days only
13	**Silver** (Non-UI)	N: North to **Lincoln Square**	↔	S: South to **FAR/PAR**	Springfield Ave; Green St via Illini Union; Wright St via Transit Plaza; Gregory Dr via Main Library; Lincoln Ave via FAR/PAR	20 minutes: Non-UI days only
14	**Navy**	W: West to **Carle at the Fields** or **Mullikin & Curtis Meadow**	↔	E: East to **Illinois Terminal**	Mullikin Dr (Limited am/pm service); Fields South Dr; Windsor Rd; Kirby Ave via Memorial Statium; First St	30 minutes: Serves **Mullikin & Curtis Meadow** only before 9:22 am and after 4:52 pm
**14**	**Navy**	W: West to **Carle at the Fields** or **Mullikin & Curtis Meadow**	↔	E: East to **Illinois Terminal**	Mullikin Dr (Limited am/pm service); Fields South Dr; Windsor Rd; Kirby Ave via Memorial Statium; First St	30 minutes: Serves **Mullikin & Curtis Meadow** only before 9:22 am and after 4:52 pm
16	**Pink**	from **Round Barn Road** to **Round Barn Road** (loop)	via	A: Clockwise to **Stephens Family YMCA** then **Parkland College**	Mattis Ave; Windsor Rd; Staley Rd; Bradley Ave; Country Fair Dr	45 minutes
16	**Pink**	from **Round Barn Road** to **Round Barn Road** (loop)	via	B: Counter-clockwise to **Parkland College** then **Stephens Family YMCA**	Mattis Ave; Windsor Rd; Staley Rd; Bradley Ave; Country Fair Dr	45 minutes
17	**Cherry**	W: West to **Congressional Way at Carle**	↔	E: East to **Fourth & Peabody**	Curtis Rd; Cherry Hills Dr; Maynard Dr; Kirby Ave; Crescent Dr; Round Barn Rd via Secretary of State; Springfield Ave; Neil St; Green St via Illini Union; Goodwin Ave; Gregory via Main Library; Fourth St / Pennsylvania Ave	35 minutes (replaces older 5X Green Express route)
21	**Raven**	from **Vet-Med** to **Vet-Med** (loop)	via	to **FAR/PAR** then **Transit Plaza** then **Illini Union** then **FAR/PAR**	Vet-Med; Lincoln Ave; College Ct via FAR/PAR; Pennsylvania Ave; Sixth St; Wright St via Transit Plaza; Green St via Illini Union; Goodwin Ave	30 minutes
22	**Illini** (UI days)	N: North to **Lincoln & Killarney**	↔	S: South to **FAR/PAR**	Anthony Dr (Select northbound trips only); **North Lincoln Ave**; **East University Ave**; **North Goodwin Ave**; **Green St via Illini Union**; **Wright St via Transit Plaza**; **Armory Ave (northbound) / Chalmers St (southbound)**; **First St**; **Peabody Dr via ARC**; Gregory Dr via Main Library; South Goodwin Ave; Illinois St; South Lincoln Ave	10 minutes: UI days only
22	**Illini Limited** (Non-UI)	N: North to **Lincoln & Killarney**	↔	S: South to **Activities & Recreation (ARC)**	Anthony Dr (Select northbound trips only); **North Lincoln Ave**; **East University Ave**; **North Goodwin Ave**; **Green St via Illini Union**; **Wright St via Transit Plaza**; **Armory Ave (northbound) / Chalmers St (southbound)**; **First St**; **Peabody Dr via ARC**; Gregory Dr via Main Library; South Goodwin Ave; Illinois St; South Lincoln Ave	20 minutes: Non-UI days only
24	**Link**	N: North to **University & Wright**	↔	S: South to **Gerty & Griffith**	University Ave; Lincoln Ave; Green St via Illini Union; Wright St via Transit Plaza; Fourth St; Kirby Ave via Lot E-14; First St (southbound) / Oak St (northbound); Gerty Dr	15 minutes

Weekday Night
Route		Termini			Major streets traveled	Interval
Route		North/West		South/East	Major streets traveled	Interval
50	Green	W: West to **Parkland College**	↔	E: East to **Orchard Downs**	Bradley Ave, Country Fair Dr; Springfield Ave via Country Fair; **Randolph St (westbound) / State St (westbound)**; **Neil St via Illinois Terminal**; **Green St via Illini Union**; **Vine St via Lincoln Square**; **Fairlawn Dr, Pennsylvania Ave**; **Florida Ave via Sunnycrest**; Philo Rd via Meijer Urbana; Windsor Rd; Orchard Downs Dr	30 minutes
50	Green Hopper	W: West to **Parkland College**	↔	E: East to **Sunnycrest**	Bradley Ave, Country Fair Dr; Springfield Ave via Country Fair; **Randolph St (westbound) / State St (westbound)**; **Neil St via Illinois Terminal**; **Green St via Illini Union**; **Vine St via Lincoln Square**; **Fairlawn Dr, Pennsylvania Ave**; **Florida Ave via Sunnycrest**; Philo Rd via Meijer Urbana; Windsor Rd; Orchard Downs Dr	15 minutes
70	Grey	W: West to **Parkland College**	↔	E: East to **Urbana Walmart**	Bradley Ave, Bloomington Rd; Randolph St (northbound) / State St (southbound); Main St via Illinois Terminal; Second St, Fifth St; Rommie St, Wright St; Park St, Fairview Ave, Church St; Broadway Ave, Vine St	30 minutes
100	Yellow	N: North to **Champaign Walmart**	↔	S: South to **Savoy Walmart**	Refer to 1 Yellow Weekday	30 minutes: Two 100N Yellow Evening runs divert to the Apollo subdivision at **Mercury & Apollo** at 10:20 pm and 10:50 pm, then continue on to **Champaign Walmart**
110	Ruby	N: North to **Airport & Cunningham**	↔	S: South to **University & Cottage Grove**	Airport Rd (southbound only); Brownfield Rd (SB only); Columbia Blvd (SB only); Napleton Way (northbound only); Cunningham Ave; Kenyon Rd; Willow Rd; Perkins Dr; Eastern Ave; Kerr Ave; Broadway Ave; Vine St; University Ave	60 minutes: Four trips between 7:33-11:20pm
120	Teal	W: West to **Illinois Terminal**	↔	E: East to **Orchard Downs**	Refer to 12 Teal Weekday	20 minutes: From 7pm to midnight
130	Silver	N: North to **Lincoln Square**	↔	S: South to **FAR/PAR** or **Vet-Med**	Refer to 13 Silver Weekday	20 minutes: UI days only; 7:25 pm to 3 am (Monday to Thursday); 7:25 pm to 5 am (Fridays only); Every other bus terminates at Vet-Med until 1:42 am
130	Silver Limited	N: North to **Lincoln Square**	↔	S: South to **Transit Plaza**	Refer to 13 Silver Weekday	20 minutes: Non-UI days only; 6:45 pm to 12:03 am
180	Lime	from **Round Barn Road** to **Round Barn Road** (loop)	via	A: Clockwise to **Kirby & Mayfair** then **Stephens Family YMCA** then **William & Duncan**	Mattis Ave via Old Farm; Kirby Ave, Crescent Dr; Windsor Rd; Duncan Rd, Westfield Dr	40 minutes
180	Lime	from **Round Barn Road** to **Round Barn Road** (loop)	via	B: Counterclockwise to **Williams & Duncan** then **Stephens Family YMCA** then **Kirby & Mayfair**	Mattis Ave via Old Farm; Kirby Ave, Crescent Dr; Windsor Rd; Duncan Rd, Westfield Dr	40 minutes
220	Illini	N: North to **Lincoln & Killarney**	↔	S: South to **FAR/PAR**	Refer to 22 Illini Weekday	10 minutes: UI days only; 7pm to 3 am (Monday to Thursday); 7 pm to 5 am (Fridays only)
220	Illini Limited	N: North to **Lincoln & Killarney**	↔	S: South to **Activities & Recreation (ARC)**	Refer to 22 Illini Limited Weekday	20 minutes: Non-UI days only; 7pm to midnight

Weekday Late Night (UI days only)
Route		Termini			Major streets traveled	Interval
Route		North/West		South/East	Major streets traveled	Interval
**50**	**Green**	W: West to **Illinois Terminal**	↔	E: East to **Lincoln Square**	Chestnut via Illinois Terminal; Walnut St / Main St / Church St / State St (eastbound only); Randolf St / University Ave (westbound only); Green St; Race St; Broadway Ave	20 minutes: Midnight to 3 am; 30 minutes: 3-5 am on Fridays only
**100**	**Yellow**	N: North to **Champaign Walmart** or **Neil & Center Dr** or **Illinois Terminal**	↔	S: South to **Lot E-14**	Refer to 1 Yellow Weekday (North of Lot E-14)	30 minutes: Midnight to 3 am; 3-5 am on Fridays only
**120**	**Teal**	N: North to **Illinois Terminal**	↔	S: South to **Orchard Downs**	Refer to 12 Teal Weekday	20 minutes: Midnight to 3 am
**130**	**Silver**	N: North to **Lincoln Square**	↔	S: South to **FAR/PAR**	Refer to 13 Silver Weekday	20 minutes: 7:25 pm to 3 am; 3-5 am (Fridays only); Every other bus terminates at Vet-Med until 1:42 am
**220**	**Illini**	N: North to **Lincoln & Killarney**	↔	S: South to **FAR/PAR**	Refer to 22 Illini Weekday	10 minutes: 7pm to 3 am (Monday to Thursday); 7 pm to 5 am (Fridays only)

==== Weekend ====
Saturday
Route		Termini			Major streets traveled	Interval
Route		North/West		South/East	Major streets traveled	Interval
20	**Red**	C: Champaign to **Champaign Walmart**	↔	U: Urbana to **Urbana Meijer**	Refer to 2 Red Weekday	30 minutes
30	**Lavender**	N: North to **Champaign Walmart**	↔	S: South to **Illinois Terminal**	Refer to 3 Lavender Weekday	30 minutes
50	**Green** (Day)	W: West to **Round Barn Road**	↔	E: East to **Orchard Downs**	**Round Barn Rd**; **Springfield Ave**; **Randolph St (Eastbound)**; **Church St / State St (Westbound)**; **Main St via Illinois Terminal**; **Neil St**; **Green St**; **Race St**; **Elm St via Lincoln Square**; **Vine St**; **Pennsylvania Ave**; **Cottage Grove Ave / Philo Rd via Sunnycrest**; Silver St; Myra Ridge Dr; Windsor Rd; Race St via Orchard Downs	30 minutes
50	**Green** (Night)	W: West to **Round Barn Road**	↔	E: East to **Orchard Downs**	**Round Barn Rd**; **Springfield Ave**; **Randolph St (Eastbound)**; **Church St / State St (Westbound)**; **Main St via Illinois Terminal**; **Neil St**; **Green St**; **Race St**; **Elm St via Lincoln Square**; **Vine St**; **Pennsylvania Ave**; **Cottage Grove Ave / Philo Rd via Sunnycrest**; Silver St; Myra Ridge Dr; Windsor Rd; Race St via Orchard Downs	30 minutes
50	**Green Hopper** (Night)	W: West to **Round Barn Road**	↔	E: East to **Sunnycrest**	**Round Barn Rd**; **Springfield Ave**; **Randolph St (Eastbound)**; **Church St / State St (Westbound)**; **Main St via Illinois Terminal**; **Neil St**; **Green St**; **Race St**; **Elm St via Lincoln Square**; **Vine St**; **Pennsylvania Ave**; **Cottage Grove Ave / Philo Rd via Sunnycrest**; Silver St; Myra Ridge Dr; Windsor Rd; Race St via Orchard Downs	15 minutes
50	**Green** (Late Night)	W: West to **Illinois Terminal**	↔	E: East to **Lincoln Square**	Refer to 50 Green Weekday Late Night	20 minutes: UI days only; Midnight to 5 am
70	**Grey**	W: West to **Round Barn Road**	↔	E: East to **Urbana Walmart**	Round Barn Rd; County Fair Dr; Bradley Ave; State St (Eastbound); Randolph St (Westbound); Church St; Main St via Illinois Terminal; University Ave; Second St; Washington St; Fifth St; Bradley Ave; Wright St; Park; Goodwin Ave; Fairview Ave; Church St via Carle; Broadway Ave; Elm St via Lincoln Square; Lierman Ave; Washington St; Main St; U.S. Rte 150 via Urbana Walmart	30 minutes: 7 am to 11 pm
100	**Yellow** (Day & Night)	N: North to **Champaign Walmart**	↔	S: South to **Savoy Walmart**	Refer to 1 Yellow Weekday	30 minutes: 7 am to midnight
100	**Yellow** (Late Night)	N: North to **Champaign Walmart** or **Illinois Terminal**	↔	S: South to **Savoy Walmart** or **Lot E-14**	Refer to 1 Yellow Weekday	30 minutes: UI fall and spring semesters only; Midnight to 5 am (Sunday morning); Last trip to **Savoy Walmart** at 11:20 pm; Last trip to **Champaign Walmart** at 1:30 am (Sunday morning); Terminates at **Lot E-14** after 12:30 am (Sunday morning); Terminates at **Illinois Terminal** after 3 am (Sunday morning)
110	**Ruby**	N: North **Airport & Cunningham**	↔	S: South **University & Cottage Grove**	Refer to 110 Ruby Weekday Night	60 minutes: 7 am to 11 pm
120	**Teal** (Day & Night)	N: North to **Illinois Terminal**	↔	S: South to **Orchard Downs**	Refer to 12 Teal Weekday	20 minutes: 7 am to midnight
120	**Teal** (Late Night)	N: North to **Illinois Terminal**	↔	S: South to **Orchard Downs**	Refer to 12 Teal Weekday	20 minutes: UI fall and spring semesters only; Midnight to 2:50 am (Sunday morning)
130	**Silver**	N: North to **Lincoln Square**	↔	S: South to **FAR/PAR** or **Vet-Med**	Refer to 13 Silver Weekday	20 minutes: UI fall and spring semesters only; 8 am to 5 am (Sunday morning); Before 7:30 pm, southbound busses leaving **FAR/PAR** on the hour and 40 minutes after the hour (:00 and :40) terminate at **Vet-Med**.; After 7:30 pm, every other bus terminates at **Vet-Med** until 1:42 am (Sunday morning)
130	**Silver Limited**	N: North to **Lincoln Square**	↔	S: South to **Transit Plaza**	Elm St via Lincoln Square; Springfield Ave; Goodwin Ave; Green St via Illini Union; Wright St via Transit Plaza; Chalmers St; Sixth St; Armory Ave	20 minutes: UI breaks and summer sessions only; 7:30 am to midnight
180	**Lime**	from **Round Barn Road** to **Round Barn Road** (loop)	via	A: Clockwise to **Kirby & Mayfair** then **Stephens Family YMCA** then **William & Duncan**	Refer to 180 Lime Weekday Night	40 minutes
180	**Lime**	from **Round Barn Road** to **Round Barn Road** (loop)	via	B: Counterclockwise to **Clayton & Ponona** then **Williams & Duncan** then **Kirby & Mayfair**	Refer to 180 Lime Weekday Night	40 minutes
220	**Illini Limited** (Day)	N: North to **Lincoln & Killarney**	↔	S: South to **Activities & Recreation (ARC)**	Refer to 22 Illini Limited Weekday	30 minutes: 7 am to 6 pm
220	**Illini Limited** (Non-UI Night)	N: North to **Lincoln & Killarney**	↔	S: South to **Activities & Recreation (ARC)**	Refer to 22 Illini Limited Weekday	20 minutes: UI breaks and summer sessions only; 6 pm to midnight
220	**Illini** (UI Night & Late Night)	N: North to **Lincoln & Killarney**	↔	S: South to **FAR/PAR**	Refer to 22 Illini Weekday	10 minutes: UI fall and spring semester only; 6 pm to 5 am (Sunday morning)
280	**tranSPORT** (Champaign)	**Church & Neil**	↔	**Memorial Stadium**	Church & Neil; Transit Plaza; Fourth & Peabody	Limited service: Runs only on Illini Football game days; Trips to **Memorial Stadium** before game time; Trips from **Memorial Stadium** after the game
280	**tranSPORT** (Urbana)	**Goodwin & Clark**	↔	**Memorial Stadium**	Goodwin & Clark; Ceramics (Before game); Materials Research (After game); Gregory Place (Between Krannert and Spurlock); Goodwin & Gregory; Florida & Dorner	Limited service: Runs only on Illini Football game days; Trips to **Memorial Stadium** before game time; Trips from **Memorial Stadium** after the game

Sunday
Route		Termini			Major streets traveled	Interval
Route		North/West		South/East	Major streets traveled	Interval
30	**Lavender**	N: North to **Champaign Walmart**	↔	S: South to **Illinois Terminal**	Refer to 3 Lavender Weekday	30 minutes: 9:15 am to 6:30 pm
50	**Green** (Day)	W: West to **Round Barn Road**	↔	E: East to **Orchard Downs**	Refer to 50 Green Saturday Day	30 minutes: 8:30 am to 6:30 pm
50	**Green** (Night & Late Night)	W: West to **Illinois Terminal**	↔	E: East to **Lincoln Square**	Refer to 50 Green Weekday Late Night	35 minutes: UI fall and spring semesters only; 6:30 pm to 3 am
70	**Grey**	W: West to **Round Barn Road**	↔	E: East to **Urbana Walmart**	Refer to 70 Grey Saturday	30 minutes: 9 am to 6 pm
100	**Yellow** (Day & Night)	N: North to **Champaign Walmart**	↔	S: South to **Savoy Walmart**	Refer to 1 Yellow Weekday	30 minutes: 9 am to 6:30 pm
100	**Yellow** (Late Night)	N: North to **Champaign Walmart** or **Neil & Center Dr**	↔	S: South to **Lot E-14**	Refer to 1 Yellow Weekday	30 minutes: UI fall and spring semesters only; 6:30 pm to 3 am (Monday morning); Last trip to **Champaign Walmart** at 12:50 am (Monday morning)
110	**Ruby**	N: North **Airport & Cunningham**	↔	S: South **University & Cottage Grove**	Refer to 110 Ruby Weekday Night	60 minutes: 8:30 am to 6 pm
120	**Teal** (Day)	N: North to **Illinois Terminal**	↔	S: South to **Orchard Downs**	Refer to 12 Teal Weekday	20 minutes: 9 am to 6 pm
120	**Teal** (Night & Late Night)	N: North to **Illinois Terminal**	↔	S: South to **Orchard Downs**	Refer to 12 Teal Weekday	20 minutes: UI fall and spring semesters only; 6 pm to 2:50 am (Monday morning)
130	**Silver**	N: North to **Lincoln Square**	↔	S: South to **FAR/PAR** or **Vet-Med**	Refer to 13 Silver Weekday	20 minutes: UI fall and spring semesters only; 9:30 am to 3 am (Monday morning); Before 7 pm, southbound busses leaving **FAR/PAR** on the hour and 40 minutes after the hour (:00 and :40) terminate at **Vet-Med**.; After 7 pm, every other bus terminates at **Vet-Med** until 1:42 am (Monday morning)
130	**Silver Limited**	N: North to **Lincoln Square**	↔	S: South to **Transit Plaza**	Refer to 130 Silver Limited Saturday	20 minutes: UI breaks and summer sessions only; 9:30 am to 5:45 pm
180	**Lime**	from **Round Barn Road** to **Round Barn Road** (loop)	via	A: Clockwise to **Kirby & Mayfair** then **Stephens Family YMCA** then **William & Duncan**	Refer to 180 Lime Weekday Night	40 minutes: 9:30 am to 6:20 pm
180	**Lime**	from **Round Barn Road** to **Round Barn Road** (loop)	via	B: Counter-clockwise to **Williams & Duncan** then **Stephens Family YMCA** then **Kirby & Mayfair**	Refer to 180 Lime Weekday Night	40 minutes: 9:30 am to 6:20 pm
220	**Illini Limited** (Day)	N: North to **Lincoln & Killarney**	↔	S: South to **Activities & Recreation (ARC)**	Refer to 22 Illini Limited Weekday	20 minutes: 8:30 am to 6 pm
220	**Illini** (UI Night & Late Night)	N: North to **Lincoln & Killarney**	↔	S: South to **FAR/PAR**	Refer to 22 Illini Weekday	10 minutes: UI fall and spring semester only; 6 pm to 3 am (Monday morning)

=== On-demand routes ===
The MTD operates three demand-responsive van services. Customers must use the MTD Connect app or call an MTD dispatcher (217-384-8188) to request a ride on all on-demand routes. All of MTD's on-demand routes cost $1 to ride, the same fare as its fixed-route services.

==== West Connect ====
Time: West Connect operates 6:40 am to 6:30 pm (last request at 6 pm), Monday through Friday all year round, except for MTD-recognized holidays.

Service area: West Connect serves the west side of Champaign with express service to the Round Barn Road bus stop.

- South of Kirby Road (with service to The Trails at Abbey Fields neighborhood)
- East of Rising Road
- North of Curtis Road
- West of Interstate 57
- Round Barn Road bus stop

==== Northeast Connect ====
Time: Northeast Connect operates 6:30 am to 7:30 pm (last request at 7 pm), Monday through Friday all year round, except for MTD-recognized holidays.

Service area: Northeast Connect serves the northeast portion of Urbana, including neighborhoods along Interstate 74 with express service to and from the Lincoln Square bus stop in downtown Urbana.

- South of Airport Road
- East of Appletree Drive
- North of Perkins Road
- West of High Cross Road
- Lincoln Square bus stop

==== SafeRides Connect ====
Time: SafeRides Connect operates on weekday and weekend evenings during University of Illinois fall, winter, and spring semesters; it does not operate over summer break. During the semester, service begins at 7 pm (5 pm during winter months).

- Ends at 6:30 am on weeks when classes are in-session
- Ends at 12:30 am during breaks

Service area: SafeRides primarily serves the University of Illinois campus.

- South of University Avenue
- East of State Street
- North of Windsor Road
- West of Vine Street

Restrictions:

- SafeRides Connect only serves groups of three or few riders at a time.
- The van service will not transport riders along a route served by a fixed-route bus service.
- The MTD will deny requests to travel from or to any bar.
- SafeRides cannot act as an emergency medical transport.

== Facilities ==
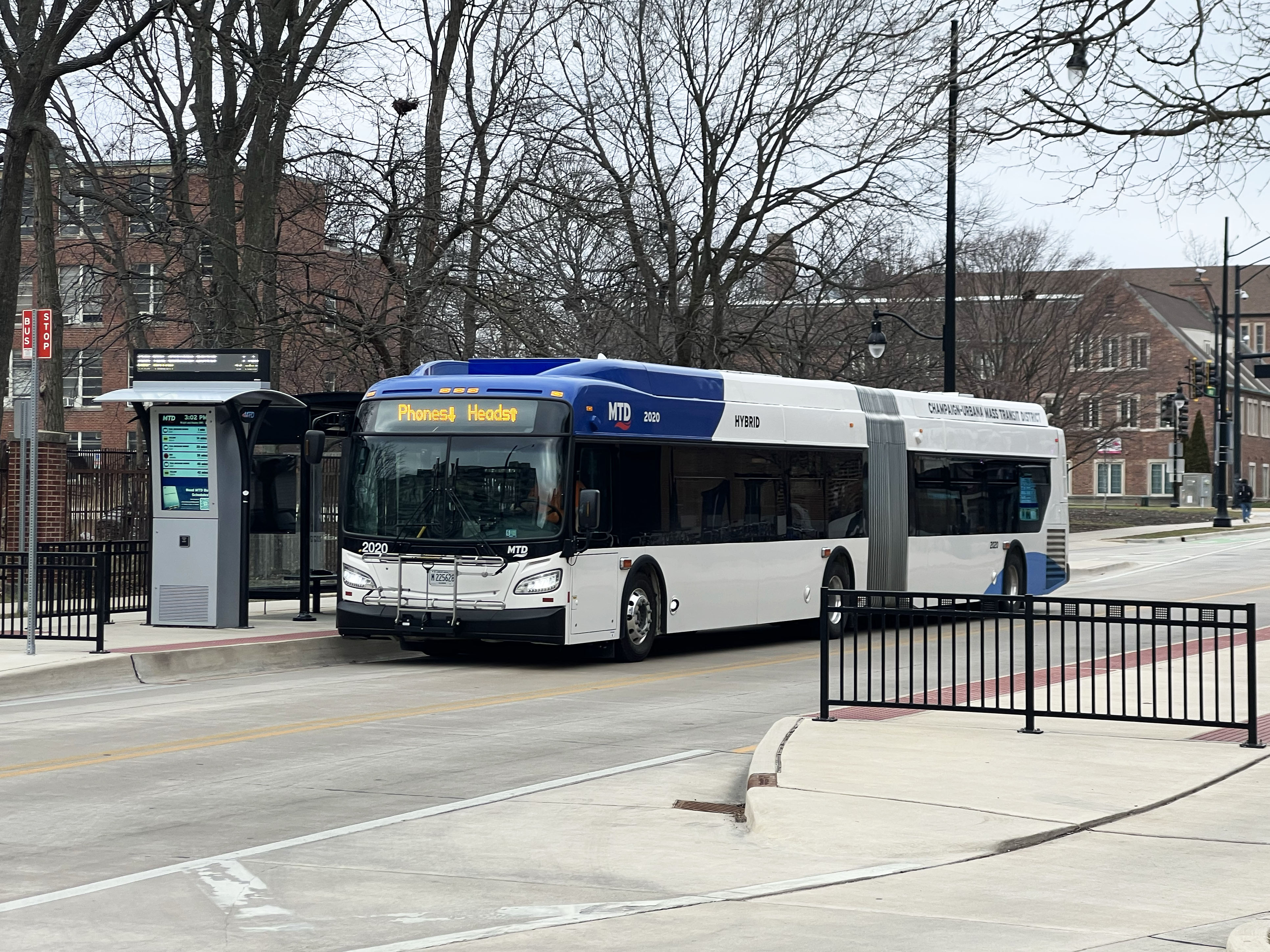
A typical MTD bus stop in Urbana, Illinois on the campus of the University of Illinois Urbana–Champaign, with a 2020 New Flyer Xcelsior XDE60 operating for 120 TEAL

Administration and Operations Offices
1101 E. University Avenue, Urbana, IL. 40°06′55″N 88°11′43″W
Maintenance Department and Bus Garage
803 E. University Avenue, Urbana, IL. 40°06′57″N 88°11′53″W
Illinois Terminal
45 E. University Avenue, Champaign, IL. 40°06′57″N 88°14′27″W
Wright Street Transit Plaza
S. Wright Street, between Daniel and John. 40°06′31″N 88°13′44″W
Downtown Urbana Transfer Point
Broadway Avenue just north of Lincoln Square, between Main and Elm. 40°06′43″N 88°12′27″W

== Vehicles ==
The MTD owns 128 busses. Of those, it operates 118 regularly and keeps 10 buses in its contingency fleet.

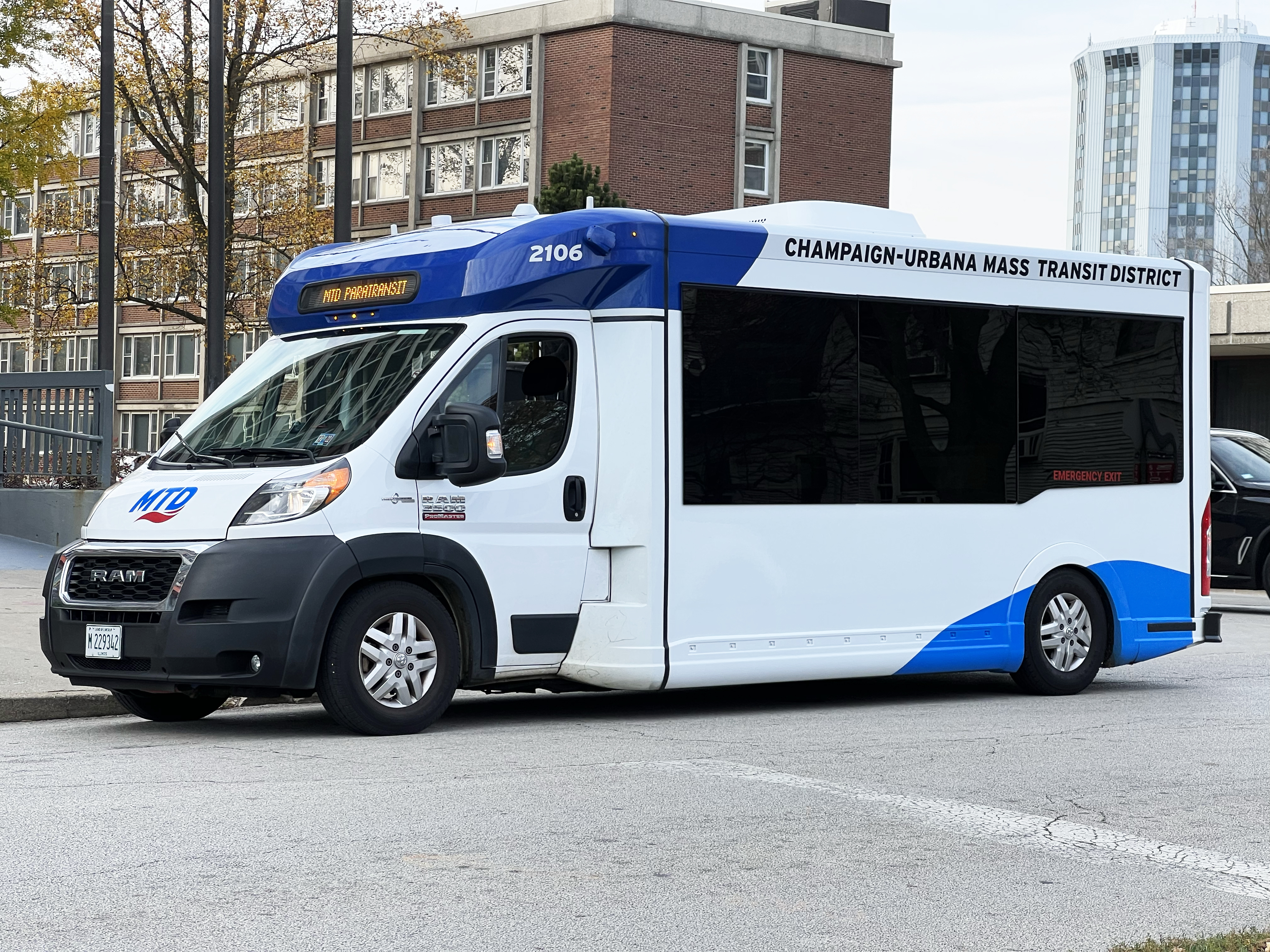
One of MTD's ADA Paratransit/SafeRides busses on a Ram ProMaster chassis

The whole fleet is built by Canadian bus manufacturer New Flyer. The active fleet includes four models of New Flyer's Xcelsior design from years ranging from 2013 to 2024. The fleet includes 19 60-foot articulated busses. The exceptions are smaller ADA and SafeRides busses mostly consisting of Ford E-Series and Ram ProMaster chassis busses.

Most of MTD's buses are powered by diesel hybrid powertrains. The District introduced zero-emission hydrogen fuel cell busses in recent years. The District currently operates 10 40-foot, 100-kilowatt fuel cell busses and two 60-foot, articulated, 85-kilowatt fuel cell busses.

The MTD generally plans to retire each of its busses after 12 years on the road. When a bus reaches retirement, it may be kept by the MTD as part of its contingency fleet in case they are needed to fill-in for active fleet busses. The District's current contingency fleet consists of 10 retired 2011 New Flyer Low Floor busses that retired between August 2024 and February 2025.

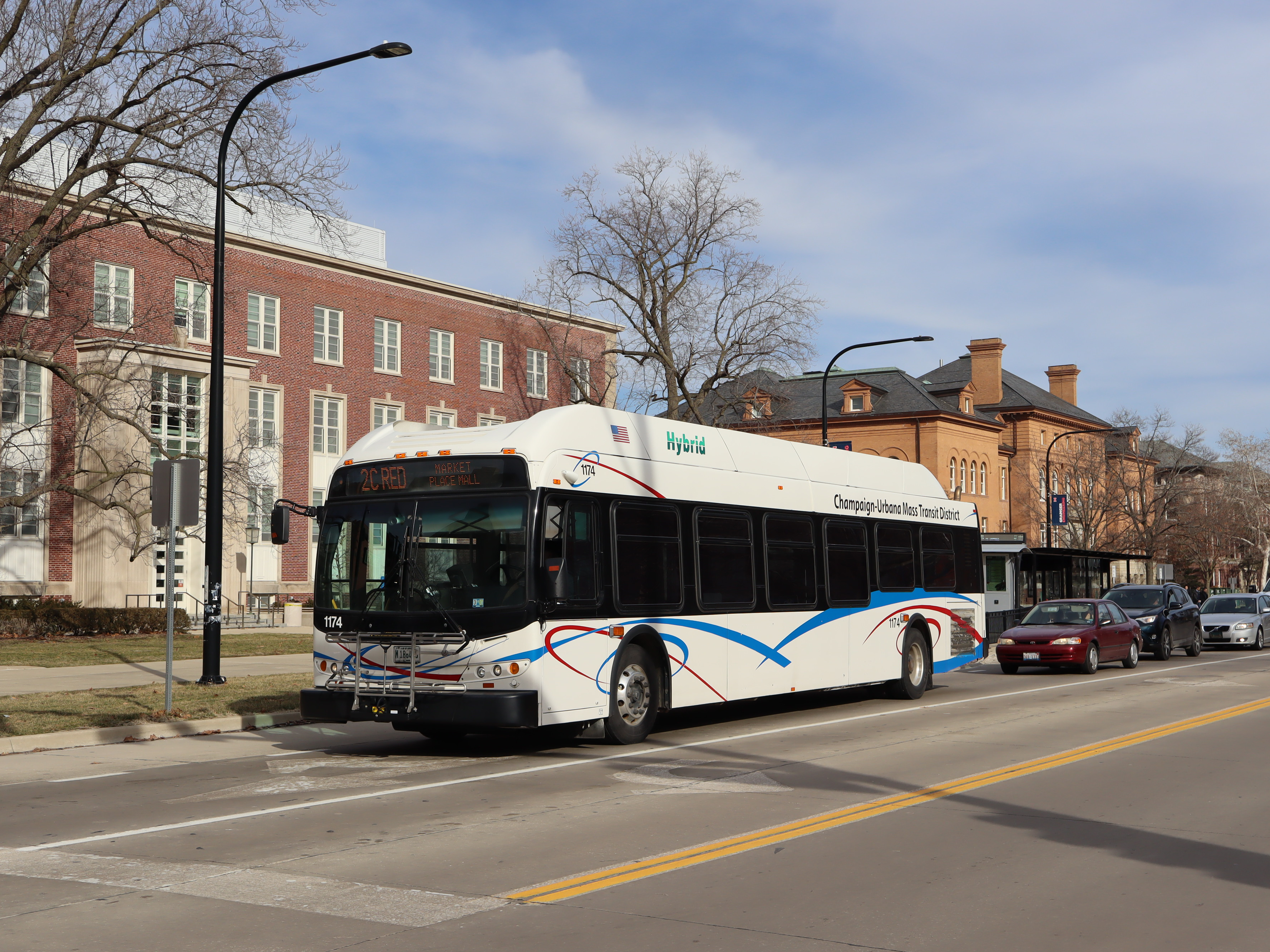
A 2011 New Flyer DE40LFR used by MTD similar to the ones in contingency

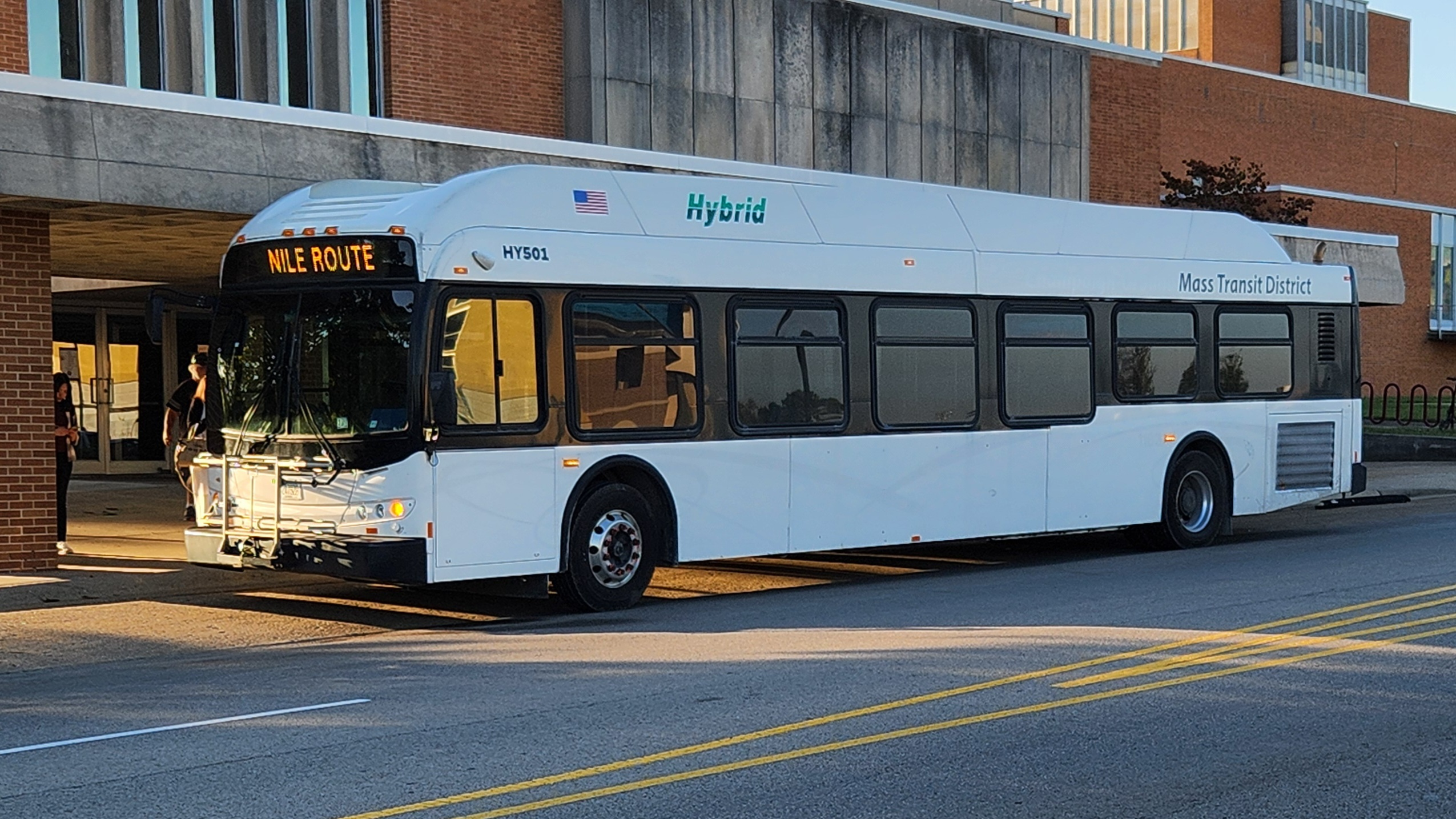
A retired MTD DE40LFR being used by JAX Mass Transit

MTD Bus Fleet
ID No.	Powertrain (Manufacturer)	Length	Entered service	Year	Make	Model
Active (118)
1346-1355	Diesel Hybrid (Allison)	40 ft.	January 2013	2013	New Flyer	XDE40
1601-1612	Diesel Hybrid (BAE)	40 ft.	August to October 2016	2016	New Flyer	XDE40
1713-1734	Diesel Hybrid (BAE)	40 ft.	April and May 2017 (1713-1730); December 2017 to February 2018 (1731-1734)	2017	New Flyer	XDE40
1835-1837	Diesel Hybrid (BAE)	40 ft.	Oct. 17, 2018	2018	New Flyer	XDE40
1938-1939	Diesel Hybrid (BAE)	40 ft.	June 25, 2019	2019	New Flyer	XDE40
2017-2022	Diesel Hybrid (BAE)	60 ft.	May to July 2020	2020	New Flyer	XDE60
2040-2044	Diesel Hybrid (BAE)	40 ft.	May to July 2020	2020	New Flyer	XDE40
2101-2102	85-KW Fuel Cell (Ballard)	60 ft.	Oct. 18, 2021	2021	New Flyer	XHE60
2103-2105	Diesel Hybrid (BAE)	60 ft.	December 2021 to March 2022	2021	New Flyer	XDE60
2145-2149	Diesel Hybrid (BAE)	40 ft.	October and November 2021	2021	New Flyer	XDE40
2200-2203	Diesel Hybrid (BAE)	40 ft.	September 2023	2022	New Flyer	XDE40
2260-2263	Diesel Hybrid (BAE)	60 ft.	July to November 2023	2022	New Flyer	XDE60
2304-2313	100-KW Fuel Cell (Ballard)	40 ft.	February to August 2024	2023	New Flyer	XHE40
2364-2367	Diesel Hybrid (BAE)	60 ft.	January and February 2024	2023	New Flyer	XDE60
2414-2439	Diesel Hybrid (BAE)	40 ft.	August 2024 to April 2025	2024	New Flyer	XDE40
Contingency (10)
1162	Diesel Hybrid (Allison)	40 ft.	August 2024 to February 2025	2011	New Flyer	DE40LFR
1164	Diesel Hybrid (Allison)	40 ft.	August 2024 to February 2025	2011	New Flyer	DE40LFR
1166	Diesel Hybrid (Allison)	40 ft.	August 2024 to February 2025	2011	New Flyer	DE40LFR
1179	Diesel Hybrid (Allison)	40 ft.	August 2024 to February 2025	2011	New Flyer	DE40LFR
1183	Diesel Hybrid (Allison)	40 ft.	August 2024 to February 2025	2011	New Flyer	DE40LFR
1185	Diesel Hybrid (Allison)	40 ft.	August 2024 to February 2025	2011	New Flyer	DE40LFR
1187	Diesel Hybrid (Allison)	40 ft.	August 2024 to February 2025	2011	New Flyer	DE40LFR
1191	Diesel Hybrid (Allison)	40 ft.	August 2024 to February 2025	2011	New Flyer	DE40LFR
1195	Diesel Hybrid (Allison)	40 ft.	August 2024 to February 2025	2011	New Flyer	DE40LFR
1196	Diesel Hybrid (Allison)	40 ft.	August 2024 to February 2025	2011	New Flyer	DE40LFR

== Fixed route ridership ==
The ridership statistics shown here are of fixed route services only and do not include demand response.

== See also ==
- C-CARTS
- Danville Mass Transit
- List of bus transit systems in the United States
