= Champaign County Area Rural Transit System =

Provider of mass transportation in Champaign County, Illinois

- Founded: October 1, 2014
- Headquarters: 1101 E. University Ave., Urbana, IL
- Locale: Rantoul, Illinois
- Service area: Champaign County, Illinois
- Service type: Bus service, Demand-response
- Routes: 5
- Hubs: Downtown Rantoul
- Annual ridership: 27,682 (2021)
- Website: Champaign County Area Rural Transit System

Champaign County Area Rural Transit System, or C-CARTS is the primary provider of mass transportation in Champaign County, Illinois, with routes serving the Rantoul area. As of 2021, the system provided 27,682 rides over 6,915 annual vehicle revenue hours.

== History ==
Public transit in Rantoul has existed since at least 1952, when the Rantoul Transit Co. served the city. However, by the 1970s, service had ended. In 1995, in order to address the transportation needs of rural Champaign County and Rantoul, a county Rural Transportation Steering Committee was established. Little changed until 2007, when IDOT notified Champaign County of available funding specifically for rural public transportation. As an indication of the necessity of transit service to the area, Rantoul resident Wendell Golston began Rantoul U-C Express, a private bus service, from Rantoul to Champaign-Urbana on May 16, 2008.

After fulfilling the requirements for funding, in 2011 CRIS Rural Mass Transit District (CRIS-RMTD) began operating rural general public transportation in Champaign County. Demand-response service was originally provided to the Rantoul area, with service expanding to the whole county in May 2013.

On October 1, 2014, the Champaign County Area Rural Transit System (C-CARTS), replace CRIS-RMTD as the service provider for the county.

Eagle Express routes, which provide deviated fixed-route service in Rantoul, launched on November 7, 2016. On November 1, 2018, service was expanded from one to three routes serving the community.

== Service ==
Champaign County Area Rural Transit System operates five deviated fixed routes, in addition to demand-response service. Buses operate from 5:00 am to 8:00 am and again between 3:00 pm and 6:00 pm, Monday through Friday. There is no weekend service. The following routes provide local service in Rantoul:

- Eagle Express
- North Eagle Express
- South Eagle Express-Direct
- Reduced Service

The Rantoul Connector route provides service from Rantoul to Champaign-Urbana and back, with connections to the Champaign-Urbana Mass Transit District and Amtrak at the Illinois Terminal.

=== Fares ===
Fares are $2.00 for local routes and $5.00 for the Rantoul Connector.

== Transfer points ==
- Downtown Rantoul (Garrard and Sangamon)
- County Market
- Walmart

== Fixed Route Ridership ==
The ridership statistics shown here are of fixed route services only and do not include demand response.

== See also ==
- List of bus transit systems in the United States
- Champaign-Urbana Mass Transit District
- Rantoul station
