= Danville Mass Transit =

Provider of mass transportation in Vermilion County, Illinois

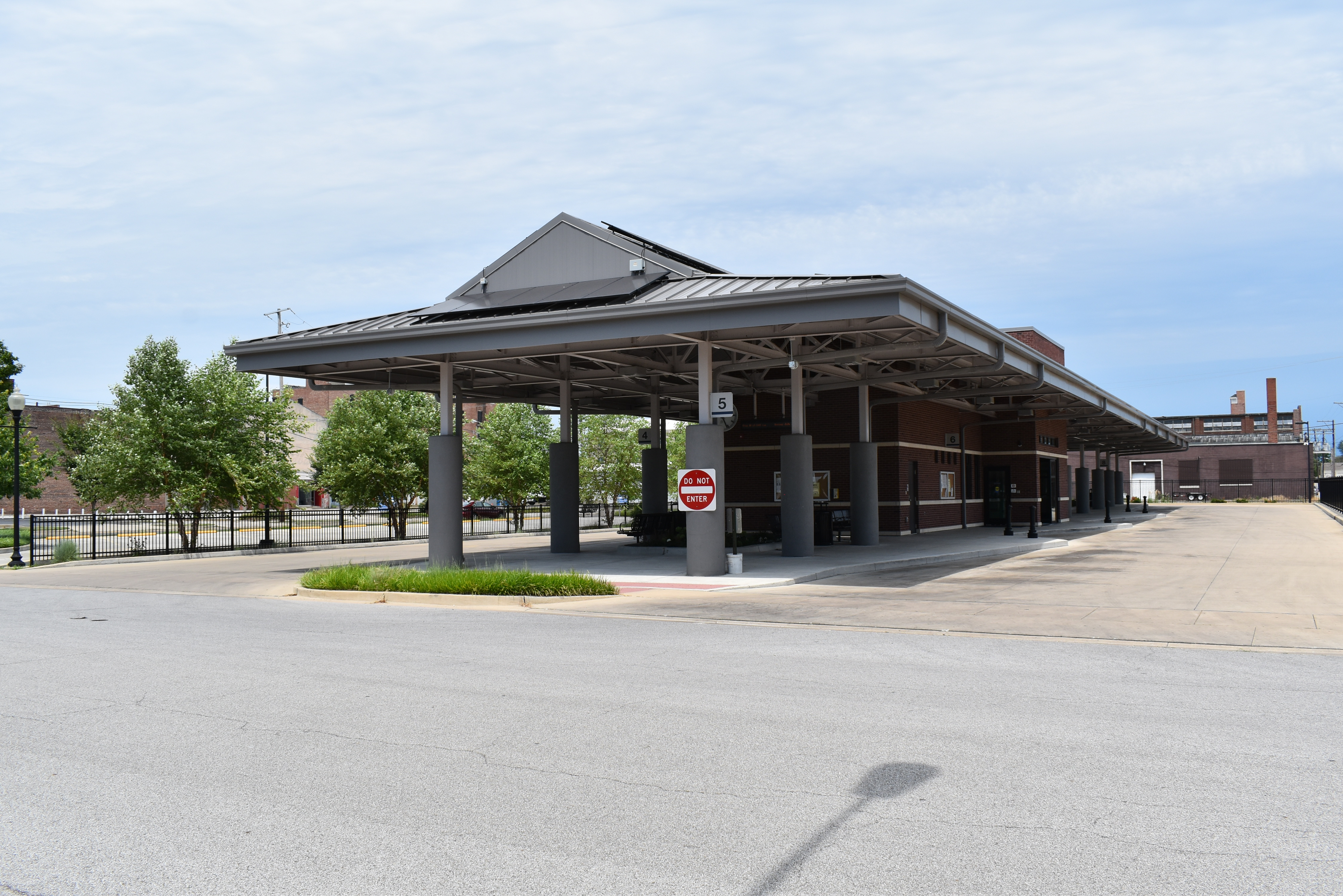
- The Richard L. Brazda Bus Terminal
- Founded: November 1973
- Headquarters: 101 N. Jackson St.
- Locale: Danville, Illinois
- Service area: Vermilion County, Illinois
- Service type: Bus service, paratransit
- Routes: 12
- Fleet: 11 buses
- Annual ridership: 606,155 (2019)
- Website: Danville Mass Transit

Danville Mass Transit is the primary provider of mass transportation in Vermilion County, Illinois with twelve routes serving the region. As of 2019, the system provided 606,155 rides over 28,659 annual vehicle revenue hours with 11 buses.

== History ==
Public transit in Danville began in the form of mule cars starting in 1883, operated by Citizens Street Railway Company. In 1891, Danville Gas Electric Light & Street Railway Company replaced the mule cars with electric streetcars and took over operations. This company became the Danville Street Railway & Light Co. in 1899. Following the purchase of the system by William B. McKinley in 1901, the Danville streetcar routes became the center of the Illinois Traction System, officially becoming part of ITS in 1904. The early ITS lines were extensions of the Danville streetcar system to nearby towns such as Catlin, Westville, and Georgetown, followed in 1903 by the main line to Urbana and Champaign. By 1906, these routes meant that Danville had a fairly large streetcar system for such a small city.

The Danville streetcar and ITS interurban lines primarily ended at the ITS interurban station, initially on the southwest corner of Reddin Square (or Public Square) at the intersection of Main and Vermilion Streets. Later, the station was moved south of the square. In 1923, ownership changed again to the Illinois Power & Light Company. By the mid 1930s, ridership had declined and the system became Danville City Lines under National City Lines control in 1936. All streetcar service ended December 4, 1936, being replaced by buses, a mere 10 years after the first bus was introduced in Danville.

Bee Line Transit Corporation took over operations in 1964, while public ownership followed in November 1973. Fares have been $1 since 2008, up from $0.75 in 2001, and $0.60 prior to that.

== Routes ==
Danville Mass Transit operates 12 bus routes on a pulse system with buses generally departing the downtown transit center at 15 and 45 minutes past each hour. Hours of operation are Monday through Friday from 5:45 A.M. to 7:11 P.M. and on Saturday from 7:15 A.M. to 7:11 P.M. No service is provided on Sunday or on major holidays. Route 10 provides service to Illinois Terminal in Champaign, providing connections to the Champaign-Urbana Mass Transit District.

- 1 Grant/Logan
- 2 Gilbert
- 4 Bowman
- 6 Main/Fairchild
- 7 Williams/Main
- 8 Douglas Park
- 9 Georgetown
- 10 Danville-Champaign
- 11 Vermilion
- 12 Heights-South Danville
- 13 Tilton
- 14 Lynch

== The Richard L. Brazda Bus Terminal ==
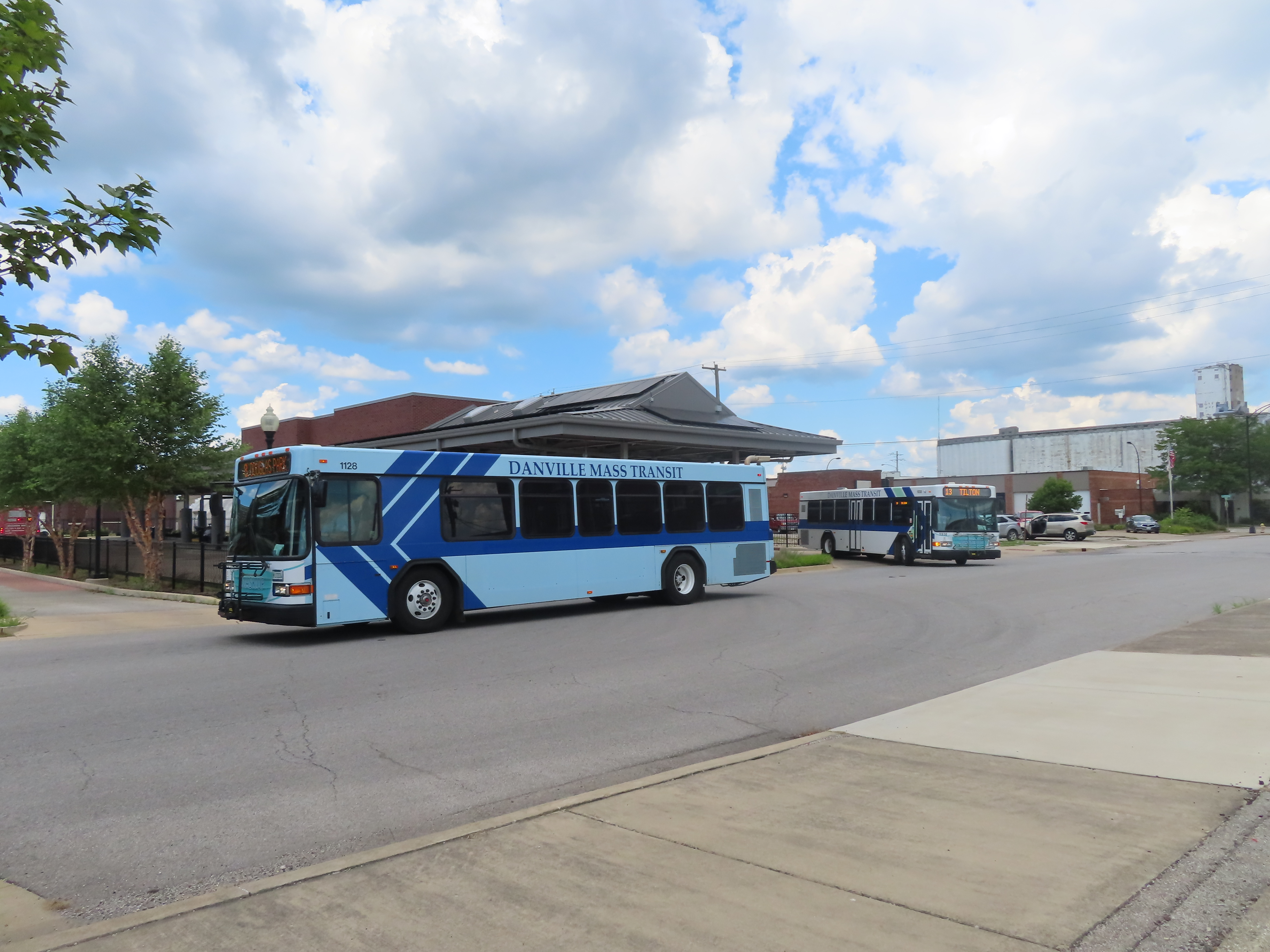
Buses departing the Richard L. Brazda Bus Terminal

The Richard L. Brazda Bus Terminal, located downtown at 101 N. Hazel St., serves as the primary transfer hub for Danville Mass Transit. Opening in 2017 and costing $3 million, the facility includes indoor seating, restrooms, and vending machines. In addition to serving Danville Mass Transit, the facility also serves intercity buses. Greyhound Lines service to the facility began in January 2019 with one round trip and stops at Champaign’s Illinois Terminal, Bloomington-Normal, Oglesby, Rochelle, Elgin, Rockford and Chicago.

== Fixed Route Ridership ==
The ridership statistics shown here are of fixed route services only and do not include demand response.

== See also ==
- Champaign-Urbana Mass Transit District
- List of bus transit systems in the United States
