= Harvey station (Illinois) =

Metra train station in Harvey, Illinois, United States

Harvey

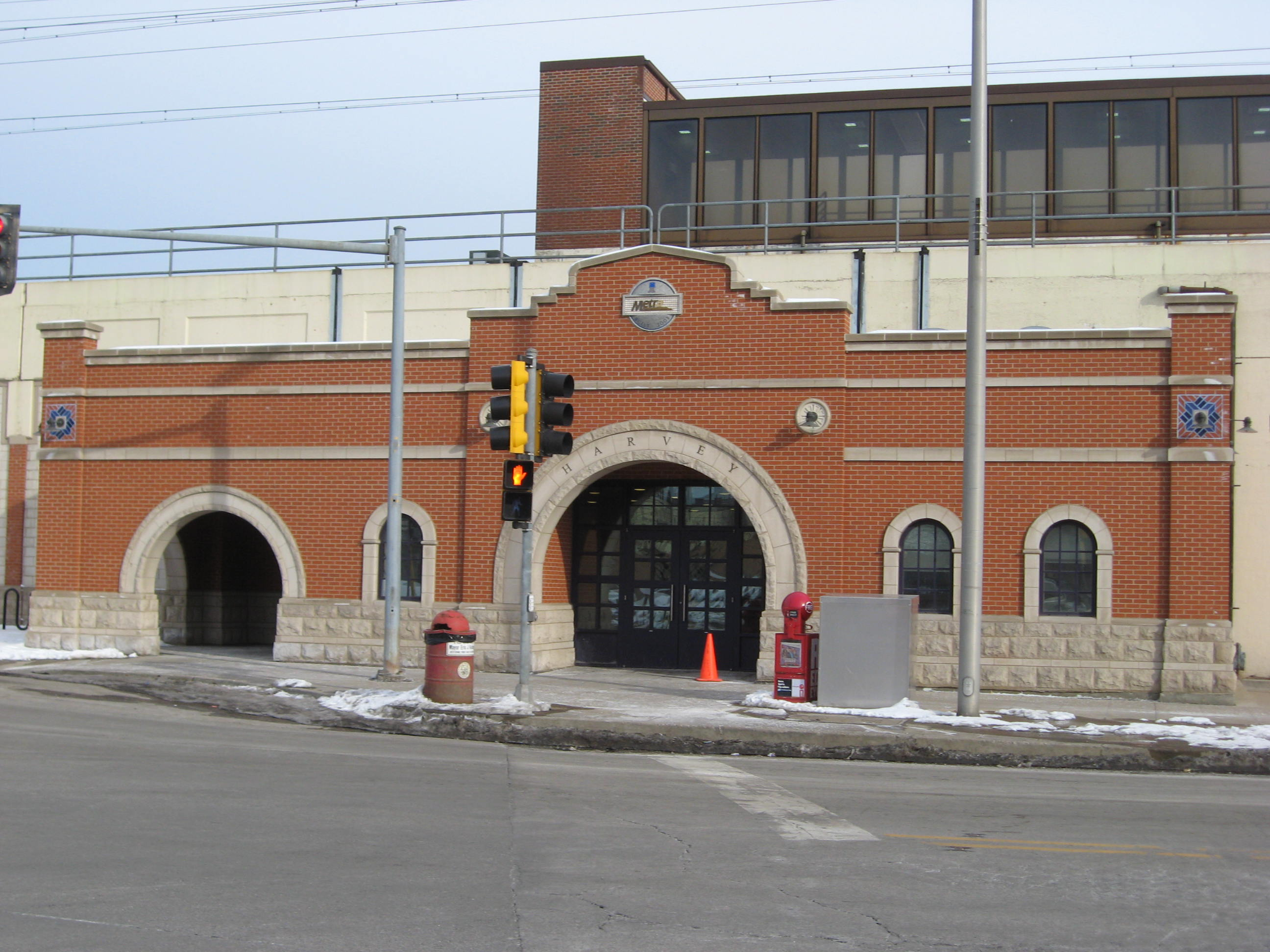
- The Harvey Metra station in February 2010.

General information
- Location: 15401 South Park Avenue; Harvey, Illinois
- Coordinates: 41.6086°N 87.6437°W
- Owner: Metra
- Line: University Park Sub District
- Platforms: 1 Island platform (formerly 2)
- Tracks: 2
- Connections: Pace Buses

Construction
- Parking: Yes
- Cycle facilities: Yes; Bicycle racks
- Accessible: Yes

Other information
- Fare zone: 2

History
- Opened: 1856
- Rebuilt: 1926, 2001
- Electrified: 1926

Passengers
- 2018: 471 (average weekday) ▼13.1%
- Rank: 102 out of 236

Services
Preceding station	Metra	Following station
Hazel Crest toward University Park	Metra Electric Main Line	147th Street/Sibley toward Millennium
Former services
Preceding station	Illinois Central Railroad	Following station
Homewood toward New Orleans	Main Line	Kensington toward Chicago
Hazel Crest toward Richton	Electric Suburban Main Line	147th Street toward Randolph Street
Washington Park Race Track Terminus	Electric Suburban Washington Park Branch	Terminus
Preceding station	New York Central Railroad	Following station
Kankakee toward Cincinnati	Chicago – Cincinnati	Kensington toward Chicago
Track layout
Location

Harvey is one of two Metra Electric commuter rail stations along the line's Main Branch in Harvey, Illinois. The station is located at Park Avenue and 154th Street, and is 20.0 miles (32.2 km) away from the northern terminus at Millennium Station. In Metra's zone-based fare system, Harvey is in zone 2. As of 2018, Harvey is the 102nd busiest of Metra's 236 non-downtown stations, with an average of 471 weekday boardings.

The station is located two blocks from City Hall, and next to Pace's Harvey Transportation Center.

Parking is available along Park Avenue and the west side of the tracks between 155th Street and a bridge for a Canadian National Railway line that crosses underneath the Metra Electric Main Branch, as well as the Amtrak line that runs parallel to it, carrying the City of New Orleans, Illini, and Saluki trains. These tracks carried the intercity-trains of the Illinois Central until 1971, and most trains stopped here. It also contains a much larger parking lot on the east side of the tracks surrounded by 155th Street, Commercial Avenue, and 156th Street.

On the evening of October 12, 1979, a switchman incorrectly aligned a switch in front of an oncoming Amtrak train, leading it to go across a now-removed crossover into a stationary freight train. The resulting crash killed 2 crew members of the freight train in what would become known as the Harvey, Illinois train collision.

The station is scheduled to be completely reconstructed in the near future, modernizing it and the nearby Pace bus terminal and making both ADA accessible.

== Bus connections ==
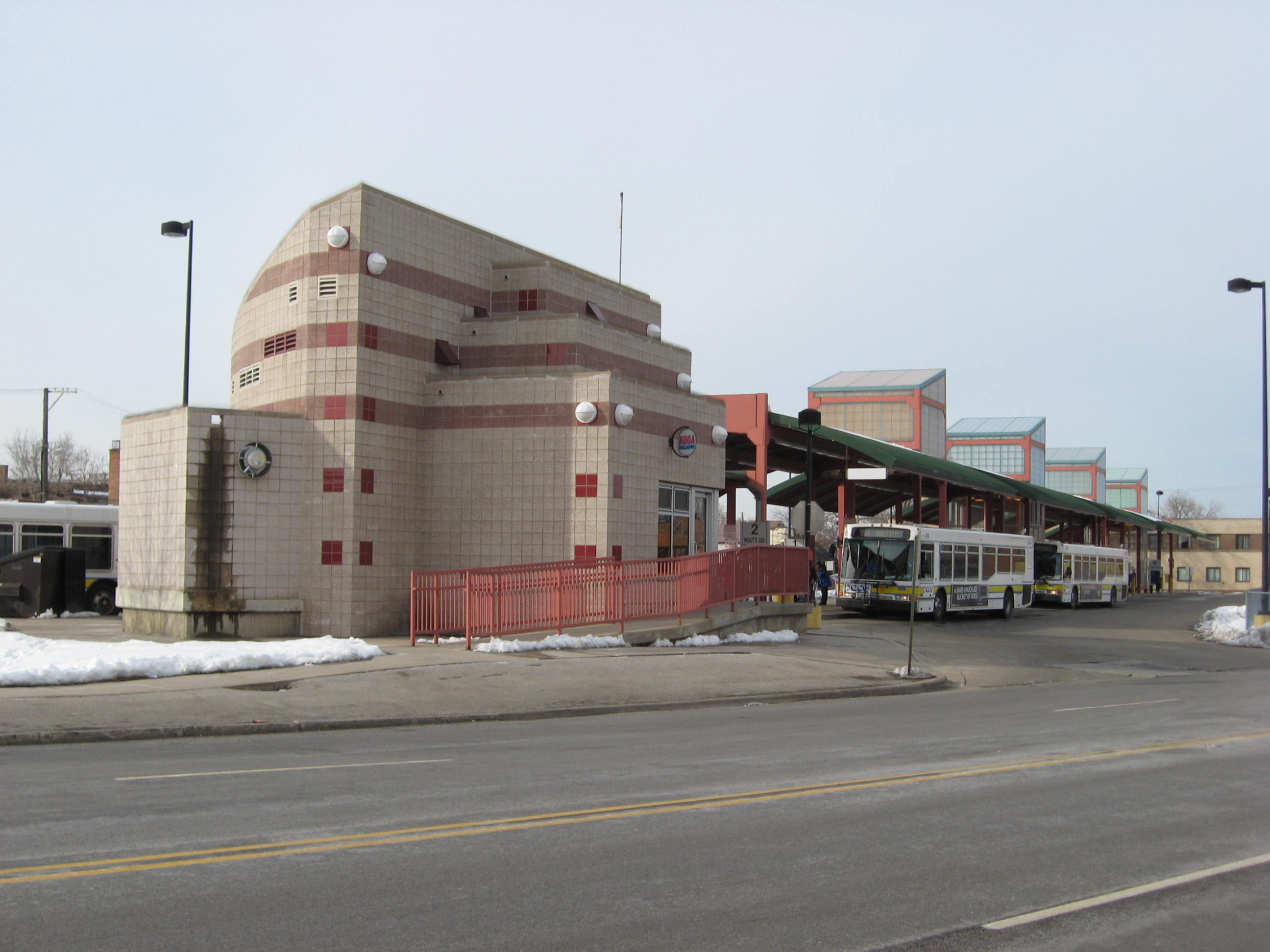
Pace Bus links are established at the nearby Harvey Transportation Center.

Pace

- 348 Harvey/Riverdale/Blue Island (Weekdays only)
- 349 South Western
- 350 Sibley
- 352 Halsted (24/7 service)
- 354 Harvey/Oak Forest Loop (Monday–Saturday only)
- 356 Harvey/Homewood/Tinley Park
- 360 Harvey/Amazon Monee Express (Amazon shifts only)
- 361 Harvey/Laraway Crossings Express (Amazon shifts only)
- 364 159th Street
- 890 Chicago Heights/UPS Hodgkins (Weekday UPS shifts only)
