= Hazel station (disambiguation) =

Hazel station may refer to:

- Hazel station, a light rail station in Sacramento, California
- Hazel Crest station, a commuter rail station in Hazel Crest, Illinois
- Hazel Grove railway station, a railway station in Greater Manchester, England
- Hazel Grove (Midland) railway station, a former railway station in Cheshire, England
