= Homewood station =

Railroad station in Homewood, Illinois

Homewood, IL
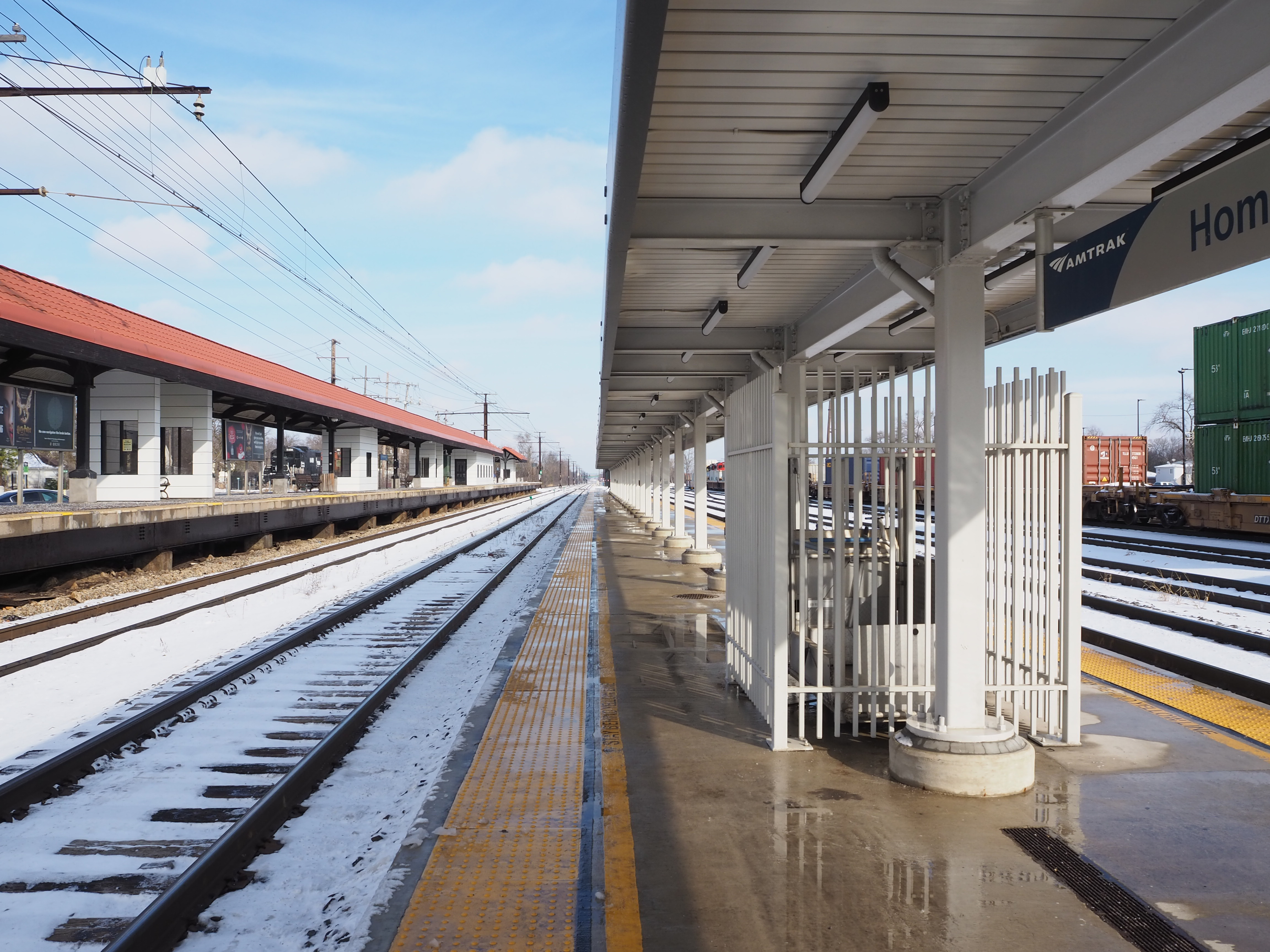
- Homewood Amtrak platform in January 2025. The Metra tracks and platform are on the left.

General information
- Location: 18015 Park Avenue; Homewood, Illinois; United States
- Coordinates: 41.5624°N 87.6686°W
- Owner: CN/Metra
- Lines: CN Chicago Subdivision (Amtrak); University Park Sub District (Metra)
- Platforms: 2 Island platforms
- Tracks: 4 (2 Amtrak, 2 Metra Electric)
- Connections: Pace

Construction
- Parking: Yes
- Accessible: Yes

Other information
- Station code: Amtrak: HMW
- Fare zone: 3 (Metra)

History
- Opened: 1923; 103 years ago
- Electrified: 1926 (Metra)

Passengers
- FY 2025: 46,211 annually (Amtrak)
- 2018: 1,171 (avg. weekday) ▼10.5% (Metra)
- Rank: 32 out of 236 (Metra)

Services
Preceding station	Amtrak	Following station
Kankakee toward New Orleans	City of New Orleans	Chicago Terminus
Kankakee toward Carbondale	Illini and Saluki	Chicago Terminus
Preceding station	Metra	Following station
Flossmoor toward University Park	Metra Electric Main Line	Calumet toward Millennium
Former services
Preceding station	Amtrak	Following station
Chicago Terminus	James Whitcomb Riley and George Washington 1971–1974	Kankakee (Penn Central) toward Washington, D.C. or Newport News
Rantoul toward Champaign–Urbana	Campus 1971–1972	Chicago–Central Terminus
Kankakee (Penn Central) toward St. Petersburg or Miami	Floridian (rerouted 1972)	Chicago–Central Terminus
Preceding station	Illinois Central Railroad	Following station
Matteson toward New Orleans	Main Line	Harvey toward Chicago
Flossmoor toward Richton	Electric Suburban Main Line	Calumet toward Randolph Street
Track layout
Location

Homewood station is an Amtrak intercity and Metra commuter train station in Homewood, Illinois. It is also the location of the Homewood Railroad Park Museum.

Served by the Metra Electric District, Homewood is 23.5 miles (37.8 km) from that line's northern terminus at Millennium Station. It is six stops away from the line's southern terminus at University Park. In Metra's zone-based fare system, Homewood is located in zone 3. As of 2018, Homewood is the 32nd busiest of Metra's 236 non-downtown stations, with an average of 1,171 weekday boardings. It is also 25 miles (40 km) from Union Station, the northern terminus of the three Amtrak services which stop here.

== History ==
In 1851, the Illinois Central Railroad began construction of their new rail line which branched south of Chicago to what is now the Village of Homewood. The first passenger train to run on this line ran from Chicago to Kankakee, IL on August 5, 1853, and stopped in present day Homewood. Also in 1853, the Illinois Central built a one-and-a-half story depot to serve to area. When the depot was built, the nearest town to the new depot was the large village of Thornton, IL, about three miles to the east of the depot, and the depot was named the "Illinois Central Thornton Depot" for sixteen years. In 1869, the depot was officially renamed to the Homewood Station.

The Illinois Central Railroad built the current Homewood Depot in 1923 to serve the Panama Limited and Seminole Limited. The station house, now used by Amtrak, was built in a mission revival style in order to complement the architecture of the clubhouse of the nearby Ravisloe Country Club.

Three years after the station opened, commuter services began. Throughout the years, the station also served such intercity trains as the City of New Orleans, Creole, and Green Diamond. In 1971, Amtrak assumed control of the Illinois Central's passenger operations and continued to stop at Homewood. Metra purchased the commuter services in 1987. In 2003 the Homewood Rail Heritage Committee approved the installation of a train watching platform for railfans similar to that of the Rochelle Railroad Park in Rochelle, Illinois. As with many suburban Metra stations, bus connections are provided by Pace Transit Systems.

On the Metra Electric, it is a regular stop on the main line. On Amtrak, it is served by the regional Illini and Saluki and the long-distance City of New Orleans.

=== 2020s renovation ===
The station underwent renovations in the early 2020s. The renovations improved facilities and brought the station complex into compliance with the Americans with Disabilities Act of 1990. Prior to the renovation, among the accessibility issues was a lack of an accessible path to the platforms from the west-side of the tracks (where Amtrak's station building is located).

The first part of the project was a $15 million renovation by Amtrak of its facilities at the station. This project utilized federal funds. The Amtrak station closed in August 2020 for the renovations. Much of the architectural features of the Amtrak portion of the station were retained, as the facility is on the Illinois Register of Historical Places. It was expanded with a new structure. Amtrak demolished the former boarding platform and built a new covered island platform to serve the two tracks that its trains utilize at the station.

After Amtrak completed its renovation of its facilities, Metra separately began a $14 million renovation of their facilities at the station. Metra replaced their station structure at Harwood Avenue and Ridge Road with a new structure, and renovated the track-access tunnel. It was funded through a combined $9 million funds from the Federal Transit Administration and Chicago Metropolitan Agency for Planning, with a further $4 million coming from Metra, $585,000 coming from Homewood, and $300,000 coming from Cook County. Metra's renovation of their facilities at the Homewood station was announced in 2020, and was part of a five-year capital investment plan involving the renovation of nine stations (including Homewood) on the Metra Electric District.

== Bus connections ==
Pace

- 356 Harvey/Homewood/Tinley Park
- 359 Robbins/South Kedzie Avenue (weekdays only)
