= Harvey, Illinois, train collision =

1979 crash with two fatalities

Harvey, Illinois train collision
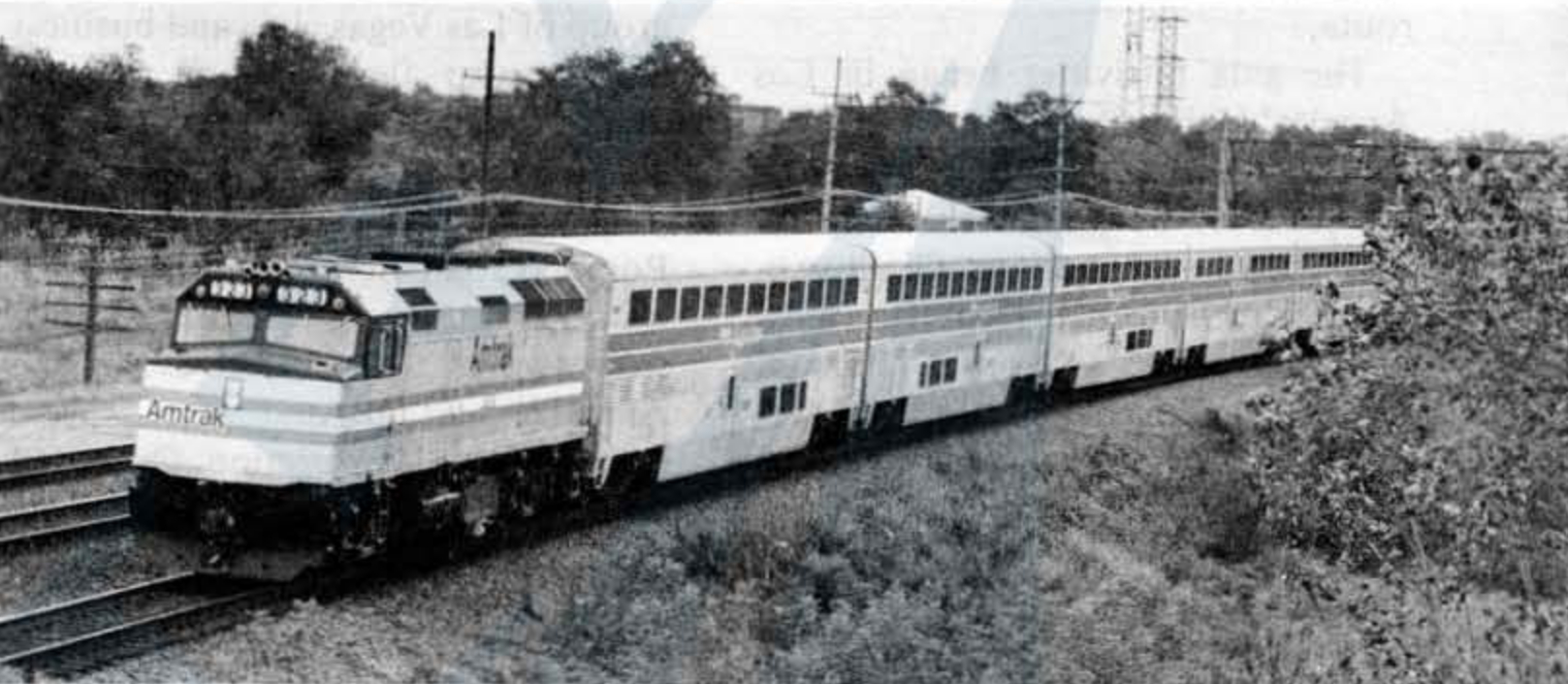
- The Amtrak train was made up of a P30CH (in this picture the locomotive is a F40PH) and five Superliners, roughly identical to this, seen the previous day.

Details
- Date: October 12, 1979; 46 years ago 9:05 PM local time
- Location: Harvey, Illinois
- Coordinates: 41°36′24.9″N 87°38′40.1″W
- Country: United States
- Line: RTA Electric District
- Operator: Amtrak, ICG
- Service: Shawnee
- Incident type: Frontal collision
- Cause: Changing a switch erroneously due to confusion of switchman

Statistics
- Trains: 2
- Passengers: 210
- Crew: 10 (6 from Amtrak, 4 from ICG)
- Deaths: 2
- Injured: 38
- Damage: Destroyed ICG lead locomotive, damaged ICG second locomotive, damaged Amtrak locomotive and one Superliner

The Harvey train collision took place on October 12, 1979, when the Shawnee train operated by Amtrak between Carbondale and Chicago Union Station crashed into a parked Illinois Central Gulf freight train, leading to the death of two crew members.

== Background ==
=== The Trains ===
On the day of the accident, the “Shawnee” train (operating number 392) from Carbondale to Chicago, Illinois, was made up of Amtrak GE P30CH unit No. 715 and five Superliner cars. The day before the accident (October 11), these passenger cars were unveiled to the public at the Union Station in Chicago, after which they were taken on a trip towards Lisle, Illinois before returning to Chicago. P30CH No. 715 was one of Amtrak's newest locomotive units at the time of the accident, having entered service in September 1975. The Superliners were less than a year old at the time of the accident, leaving the Pullman-Standard factories for Amtrak between December 1978 and July 1979.

The Illinois Central Gulf (ICG) freight train (operating number 51) consisted of three EMD GP40 units, which entered service sometime between 1966 and 1971, and forty freight cars, along with a caboose at the end of the train.

=== Harvey Railroad Yard ===
The railroad yard at Harvey is situated on the Metra Electric District (at the time operated by the Regional Transportation Authority (RTA)). The RTA-operated line ended at University Park, Illinois, but the other tracks used by the ICG led to Carbondale, and onwards to New Orleans. Eight tracks were located at the site of the crash, numbered west to east with their roles as follows:

- 1 - Southwards, Suburban - outbound RTA commuter service towards University Park
- 2 - Northwards, Suburban - inbound RTA commuter service towards Chicago
- 3 - Southwards - Passenger and freight towards Bourbonnais, Illinois
- 4 - Northwards - Passenger and freight towards Chicago
- 5 - Southwards - Freight, sidings
- 6 - Northwards - Freight, sidings
- 7 - Transfer train tracks
- 8 - Private industrial spur tracks

Seven crossovers permitted trains to leave and/or enter Harvey yard, going across all tracks. Switches for tracks number 3 and 4 were equipped with electrically operated actuators before 1971, but an accident on January 23, 1971, when an experienced switch-tender misaligned a switch which led to a collision that made the ICG introduce timetable special instructions, and also instruct trains passing tracks 3 and 4 to approach the switches at a reduced speed, however this speed was never prescribed. The ICG rule also stated that the trains were to be prepared to stop short of the switch (or any other obstacles), but this could only be done if the train was moving at "walking speed". Switch-tenders at the time were equipped with Motorola MT500 walkie-talkies, to ease the communications between the ICG staff.

Train directors should supervise and record all movements against the flow of traffic, tagging his board as well as insuring that the leverman or switch-tender make similar arrangements at their locations... Plan ahead for train and engine movements by securing line-up, etc. Be precise and accurate and insure that instructions issued by subordinates to crews are the same. This includes just the minimum amount of conversation on the telephone and radio for business purposes only... The above instructions must be literally complied with.

-- ICG instructions for Harvey Yard, issued on June 23, 1975.

=== Crew members ===
There were 10 crew members in total, 4 on the ICG train and 6 on the Amtrak train.

==== ICG crew (train number 51) ====
- Conductor Benjamin L. Gardner, aged 37, was employed as a brakeman on May 2, 1963, by the ICG, being later promoted to conductor on May 13, 1969.
- Engineer Harold Ross Coghlan, aged 55, was employed as a fireman on June 5, 1974, by the ICG, being later promoted to engineer on May 21, 1975. †
- Head Brakeman Richard O. Kingery, aged 21, was employed as a trackman on June 14, 1977, by the ICG, transferring to the Car Department on January 8, 1979, and later at the Transportation Department as a brakeman on October 9, 1979. †
- Rear Brakeman Thomas Parker Brown, aged 20, was employed as a trackman on May 9, 1978, by the ICG, transferring to the Transportation Department as a brakeman/switchman on January 10, 1979.

==== Amtrak crew (train number 392) ====
- Conductor James Lowell Garrison, aged 47, was employed as a brakeman by the ICG on August 1, 1950, being promoted to conductor on December 15, 1958. He was required to wear glasses at all times while on duty.
- Engineer John Joseph Taksas, aged 65, was employed as a fireman by the ICG on January 21, 1940, being promoted to engineer on January 27, 1949. He was required to wear glasses at all times while on duty.
- Fireman James Alexander Murray, aged 29, was employed as a fireman by the ICG on June 8, 1973, entering engineer training on June 28, 1978, completing it on April 26, 1979.
- Baggageman Donald Eugene Schwieger, aged 30, was employed as a brakeman by the ICG on December 8, 1967, being promoted to conductor on October 6, 1972.
- Flagman John Clarence Washington, aged 48, was employed as a laborer in the Car Department by the ICG on May 19, 1953, working on various positions (including car inspector) up to August 26, 1968, when he transferred to the Transportation Department, being promoted to conductor on March 3, 1973.

==== Railway supervising crew ====
- Train director Norville J. Gapen, aged 49, was employed as an agent-operator by the GM&O on February 7, 1949, and was promoted to train director on October 28, 1974.
- Yardmaster James Alton Avant, aged 50, was employed as a switchman by the ICG on November 26, 1952, and was promoted to engine foreman on June 13, 1953, then to yardmaster around 1967.
- Switchman Gregory Harris, aged 18, had been employed as a switchman/brakeman on August 10, 1979, two months prior to the crash. He was required to wear glasses at all times while on duty

== Events ==
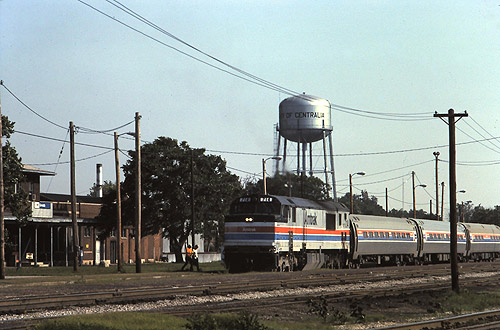
The Amtrak train was a Shawnee, composed of a GE P30CH and five Superliner passenger cars (the train seen in this photo is equipped with Amfleet cars).

At 8:45 PM local time, ICG train number 51 stopped 20 feet (6.1 meters) before the crossover on track 3, due to a train ahead dealing with a crew change. The crew of train No. 51 was then instructed to wait until Amtrak train 392 had passed them, after which the train was to overtake the stopped train on track 3, before moving back to track 4. During this time, the lights of train No. 51 were switched off.

The train director from nearby Kensington telephoned the yardmaster to relay a set of instructions for moving trains Numbers 51 and 392 to the switch-tender. The yardmaster proceeded to radio the switch-tender, but because the switch-tender complained that his connection was breaking up, he was telephoned and instructed to switch the crossovers for train No. 51 after a passenger train was to go past it, and also align a switch on track 6. The yardmaster did not remember if he said train No. 392 or passenger train, but he did not specify the locomotive's number or the track where it would operate. The switch-tender went to track 6 for a local transfer train, but as he was leaving for the crossover on track 4, he was called back by the conductor of that train to realign an improperly aligned switch. After correcting this mistake, he left the area back towards track 4.

RTA commuter train 160 departed Homewood station at 8:52 PM towards Chicago, and it was noticed by the switch-tender arriving at 9 PM at the platforms of the nearby Harvey station. Assuming that this was the passenger train mentioned in the telephone communication, he proceeded to the switch and unlocked it. At the same time, Amtrak train No. 392 departed Homewood, Illinois on its last leg towards Union Station. The crew of the train reportedly heard the following transmission on the radio "After 392 goes by, let 51 down him cross onto 4", followed by "Your radio is breaking up, I can't understand it".

The Amtrak train accelerated to 65 mph, but approaching Harvey, the engineer slowed the train down to 58 mph. As the train passed under signal 2056, the brakes were still applied, despite the signal showing a "proceed" aspect. At this point, both the engineer and fireman saw the targets on the switch show green, meaning continuing to go on a straight path. Once the fireman shouted "lined", the brakes were released, meaning that the train was to proceed as normally.

The switch-tender saw a headlight coming from the south and believed that it was a slow-moving freight train. Unable to determine what track it was from, he proceeded to align the switch on track 4 to change the path of the oncoming train onto heading into the parked freight train. The crew of the Amtrak train did not see anyone on the ground but the fireman reported seeing the switch targets turn red, just before the switch. He shouted a warning to the engineer, who applied the emergency brakes and blasted a long, continuous horn, which was heard by the switch-tender. Realizing that the collision was imminent, he ran away from the switch. At the same time, the crew of train No. 51 noticed the oncoming train and said twice "Don't line that switch, you are going to line him in on top of us". He attempted to reach for the radio and to tell the other engineer to stop, but it was too late. The train entered the crossover at 56.5 mph (58 mph on the speedometer) and the Amtrak train struck the parked ICG train at 9:05 PM.

The impact was fatal for the crew of train No. 51, the first locomotive was pushed against the second locomotive, which mounted the first locomotive of the train, along with the Amtrak locomotive, completely destroying it, killing its crew members. Only the chassis of the first locomotive was left. This also resulted in damage to the overhead line equipment, and the second locomotive received significant damage, whilst the rest of the train was intact. The Amtrak locomotive and first car overturned after they collided with ICG GP40 No. 3029, the force of impact being so great, that the P30CH's engine mounts were torn off and the engine separated from the locomotive. Other damages included ruptured fuel tanks and the crushed cab in the fireman's position. The first Superliner coach was only moderately damaged, as one of the switch targets penetrated one of its walls 12 inches (30 centimeters) deep, below an upper-level window, protruding 3 inches (7.6 centimeters) into one of the seats. The next two cars were only slightly damaged and remained upright. The fourth car suffered no external damage, but moist (and improper) wood furnishings pulled loose the snackbar from the anchor bolts, collapsing inside the car. The last car of the Shawnee stayed on the tracks, undamaged.

== Aftermath and NTSB report ==
The fire department and police were quick to respond, in three minutes, due to the proximity of the fire and police station to the site of the accident. Damage was estimated at $1,685,000 after the accident.

The ICG crew members' bodies were located not far from the debris of the accident. It is unknown if they made any efforts to leave the cab, but it is likely that they did not, considering the lack of time and that the engineer tried to radio the engineer of the other train. The crew members of the Amtrak locomotive made no efforts to leave the engine room, and Fireman Murray sat on the floor at the time of the accident, facing forward with his feet against the front wall. His actions minimized his injuries, which would have been worse as the locomotive cab was crushed inwards towards the seat, however he still had a concussion and injuries to his cervical spine. Engineer Taksas had no recollection from the moment of the accident, but it is likely he struck the radio controls during the impact and subsequent rollover of the locomotive, as this equipment was found damaged. His injuries included internal injuries, a possible concussion, a fractured hip and right ribs with hematoma. The only other serious injury was located in the fourth car, where the snackbar counter collapsed, injuring and trapping the attendant. Five passengers were hospitalized for more than 48 hours, whilst another 33 left the accident with cuts, bruises, sprains and concussions.

When initially interrogated, switch-tender Harris said that he knew he was doing a poor job on that day, but not only on the day of the crash, but also on other days. The day of the crash was also his second day working as a switch-tender, the previous times he worked as a brakeman. Before this, investigators found out that a number of trains were missing from his logbook. The signals and braking systems on the Amtrak train were tested, and were operating correctly.

=== NTSB Report ===
The NTSB report was finalized on April 3, 1980, and released on May 20, 1980.

The report stated that, if the electrically locked switches had not been removed in 1971, then the train would have passed the signal and kept going straight to Chicago, without the interference of the switch-tender, going on to explain how even an experienced switch-tender would make the same mistake. Removal of these switches, thus resulted in removing the only "positive safety feature to prevent switches being operated immediately in front of an approaching train".

Aside from the removal of the switches, the ICG was criticized for the lack of proper training given to switch-tenders. It was considered that "at no time is the new employee provided with adequate information on the switch-tender's position, nor does he receive student training before taking up this job". Train crews in and out of Harvey yard at the time reported improperly aligned switches, including the train that left track 6. It was determined that one of the factors into this crash was the short period of instruction, which could not allow him to become familiar with the physical layout of the switches, tracks, etc. The period of two months between his assignments did not help either.

Another factor was the communication done from the train director to the switch-tender, through the yardmaster. This resulted due to the weak signal that resulted from the Motorola radio units, which were smaller than the original ones used by ICG at Harvey yard. This meant that the train director had to instruct the switch-tender indirectly, through the yardmaster, even for mainline instructions, which was against ICG rules. The instructions for the train leaving Harvey yard and trains 392 and 51 were also relayed together, had the yardmaster relayed only the instructions to prepare the switch only for the train leaving the yard, he would have ignored the passing Amtrak train and would have also avoided the accident. Also during communications, the yardmaster mentioned a passenger train, but since the switch-tender could not tell the difference between a commuter train and intercity train, he misunderstood the information given to him. Even giving out the locomotive number would have, at least, helped the switch-tender. Finally, the switch-tender most likely did not switch onto channel 1 of the radio, which made him not hear the crew of train 51 shouting for help (channel 1 was used for mainline traffic, channel 2 was used for yard traffic).

==== Findings and conclusion ====
- Electrically locked switches would have prevented the switch-tender from operating the switch immediately in front of train 392.
- Neither the hand thrown switches, nor the ICG rules prevent switches being operated immediately in front of an oncoming train, therefore, adequate protection does not exist at the Harvey crossovers area.
- Even if signal 2056 showed green, it did not prevent the switch being changed after the train went past it. Same goes for switch targets.
- Except for signal 2056 and the switch targets, there is no other indicator available for the engineer to determine the position of the switches. The "safe speed" of passing through the area is also not specified, and the ICG relied on the discretion of the engineer when passing through this area.
- The train director at Kensington was forced to relay to the switch-tender through the yardmaster at Harvey, against ICG regulations, due to poor capabilities of the mobile radio units they were issued.
- The switch-tender at Harvey was not supervised, so he was supposed to be given out information and tasks through the radio, assuming he had gained enough knowledge for his tasks. The training program failed to train him sufficiently for this task.
- The Amtrak personnel were not used, nor instructed in the new features of the Amtrak cars, making the evacuation slightly difficult.

The NTSB determines that the probable cause of the accident was the switch-tender's manual misalignment of a switch, immediately in advance of a train, which caused train 392 to be directed into a crossover and collide with a standing freight train on the adjacent track. The misalignment was possible due to a lack of interlock or other positive means to prevent this movement. Contributing to the accident was the lack of training and limited experience of the employee assigned as switch-tender, and an inadequate communications system to give directions to the switch-tender.

==== Recommendations ====
The first recommendations were issued on December 18, 1979, and it contained the following:

- Provide at the Harvey Yard location an interlocking system or other positive means to prevent the inadvertent misalignment of switches in advance of a train operating within the signal block.
- Until positive safeguards can be provided for the operation of switches, restrict speeds through the area of the Harvey crossover so that trains can be stopped short of a switch which is improperly aligned, but not exceeding 20 mph.
- Immediately qualify all switchmen/brakemen who function as switch-tenders by providing sufficient training in the specific rules that apply to switch-tenders, in the physical layout of tracks and switches, and in train operations in the area of their responsibility.

Later another set of recommendations were made:

- Installation of a system that will ensure that the switch-tender at Harvey and train director can have direct communication when necessary for the movement of trains in the Harvey area.
- When radios with multiple channels are used in train operations by employees who must use several channels, issue instructions that identify the channel the employee must monitor for receiving instructions.
- Instruct supervisors to monitor the activities of the employees performing the switch-tender duties at Harvey for fitness and ability to perform those duties of the assignment.
- The NPRC (Amtrak) must ensure that all crew members on Amtrak passenger trains are trained to identify and operate all pertinent features of the equipment.

=== Aftermath ===
After the report, the crossovers that connected tracks 3 and 4 were removed. The leading GP40 of the ICG and the P30CH of Amtrak were scrapped, being damaged beyond repair. GP40 No. 3029 of the ICG was repaired, but after another accident later in 1984, it was cannibalized for spare parts. There is no memorial plaque at the site of the accident, as this accident was almost forgotten among many people, but it showed grave deficiencies in railroad operations in the US in the late 1970s.
