= Ivanhoe railway station =

Ivanhoe railway station may refer to:

- Ivanhoe railway station, New South Wales, a railway station in Ivanhoe, New South Wales, Australia
- Ivanhoe railway station, Melbourne, a railway station in Melbourne, Victoria, Australia
- Ivanhoe (Metra station), a commuter rail station on the Metra Electric main branch in Riverdale, Illinois

== See also ==
- Ivanhoe Station, a cattle station
