= East Hazel Crest, Illinois =

- Village
- Seal
- Motto: The best little village in Illinois
- Location of East Hazel Crest in Cook County, Illinois.

- Location within Greater Chicago Location within Illinois Location within the United States
- Coordinates: 41°34′35″N 87°39′8″W
- Country: United States
- State: Illinois
- County: Cook
- Township: Thornton
- Incorporated: 1928

Government
  - Type: Mayor-council
  - Village president: Thomas A. Brown

Area
  - Total: 0.78 sq mi (2.03 km^{2})
  - Land: 0.78 sq mi (2.03 km^{2})
  - Water: 0 sq mi (0.00 km^{2})
- Elevation: 620 ft (190 m)

Population (2020)
  - Total: 1,297
  - Density: 1,653.7/sq mi (638.51/km^{2})
- Time zone: UTC-6 (CST)
  - Summer (DST): UTC-5 (CDT)
- ZIP Code(s): 60429
- Area code: 708
- FIPS code: 17-21904
- FIPS code: 17-21904
- GNIS ID: 2398777
- Wikimedia Commons: East Hazel Crest, Illinois
- Website: easthazelcrest.com

East Hazel Crest is a village in Cook County, Illinois, United States. It is a south suburb of Chicago. As of the 2020 census, the village population was 1,297.

== History ==
East Hazel Crest was a part of Hazel Crest when it incorporated in 1911 until the Illinois Central Railroad elevated their commuter and mainline tracks above grade, isolating the rural community from the rest of Hazel Crest. The community voted for incorporation into their own village in 1918. The village later annexed a small commercial area and residential subdivision, Bremerton Woods, that lies west of the Illinois Central Railroad where the village administration and Metra station now stand.

== Geography ==
East Hazel Crest is located at 41°34′35″N 87°39′8″W (41.576384, -87.652171).

According to the 2021 census gazetteer files, East Hazel Crest has a total area of 0.78 square miles (2.02 km^{2}), all land.

=== Surrounding areas ===
Harvey
Hazel Crest South Holland
Hazel Crest Thornton
Homewood Homewood
Homewood

== Demographics ==
Historical population
Census	Pop.	Note	%±
1920	394		—
1930	686		74.1%
1940	754		9.9%
1950	1,066		41.4%
1960	1,457		36.7%
1970	1,885		29.4%
1980	1,362		−27.7%
1990	1,570		15.3%
2000	1,607		2.4%
2010	1,543		−4.0%
2020	1,297		−15.9%
U.S. Decennial Census; 2010 2020

=== Racial and ethnic composition ===
East Hazel Crest village, Illinois – Racial and ethnic composition Note: the US Census treats Hispanic/Latino as an ethnic category. This table excludes Latinos from the racial categories and assigns them to a separate category. Hispanics/Latinos may be of any race.
Race / Ethnicity (NH = Non-Hispanic)	Pop 2000	Pop 2010	Pop 2020	% 2000	% 2010	% 2020
White alone (NH)	842	485	291	52.40%	31.43%	22.44%
Black or African American alone (NH)	597	822	748	37.15%	53.27%	57.67%
Native American or Alaska Native alone (NH)	0	7	0	0.00%	0.45%	0.00%
Asian alone (NH)	10	8	4	0.62%	0.52%	0.31%
Pacific Islander alone (NH)	0	1	0	0.00%	0.06%	0.00%
Other race alone (NH)	1	0	6	0.06%	0.00%	0.46%
Mixed race or Multiracial (NH)	41	13	39	2.55%	0.84%	3.01%
Hispanic or Latino (any race)	116	207	209	7.22%	13.42%	16.11%
Total	1,607	1,543	1,297	100.00%	100.00%	100.00%

=== 2020 census ===
As of the 2020 census, East Hazel Crest had a population of 1,297. There were 545 households and 356 families residing in the village. The population density was 1,654.34 inhabitants per square mile (638.74/km^{2}).

The median age was 40.7 years. 20.5% of residents were under the age of 18 and 17.3% of residents were 65 years of age or older. For every 100 females there were 83.2 males, and for every 100 females age 18 and over there were 79.6 males age 18 and over.

About 29.5% of households had children under the age of 18 living in them. Of all households, 26.6% were married-couple households, 23.1% were households with a male householder and no spouse or partner present, and 44.2% were households with a female householder and no spouse or partner present. About 32.1% of all households were made up of individuals, and 10.6% had someone living alone who was 65 years of age or older.

There were 630 housing units at an average density of 803.57 per square mile (310.26/km^{2}). Of the housing units, 13.5% were vacant. The homeowner vacancy rate was 3.4% and the rental vacancy rate was 10.2%. 100.0% of residents lived in urban areas, while 0.0% lived in rural areas.

=== Income and poverty ===
The median income for a household in the village was $50,583, and the median income for a family was $68,594. Males had a median income of $38,929 versus $31,902 for females. The per capita income for the village was $29,269. About 9.0% of families and 9.0% of the population were below the poverty line, including 4.6% of those under age 18 and 11.4% of those age 65 or over.

== Government ==
East Hazel Crest is in Illinois's 2nd congressional district.

== Transportation ==
The Calumet station provides Metra commuter rail service along the Metra Electric District. Trains travel north to Millennium station in Chicago, and south to University Park station. Pace provides bus service on Route 356 connecting East Hazel Crest to destinations across the Southland.
