= Riverdale station (Illinois) =

Commuter rail station in Riverdale, Illinois

137th Street Riverdale

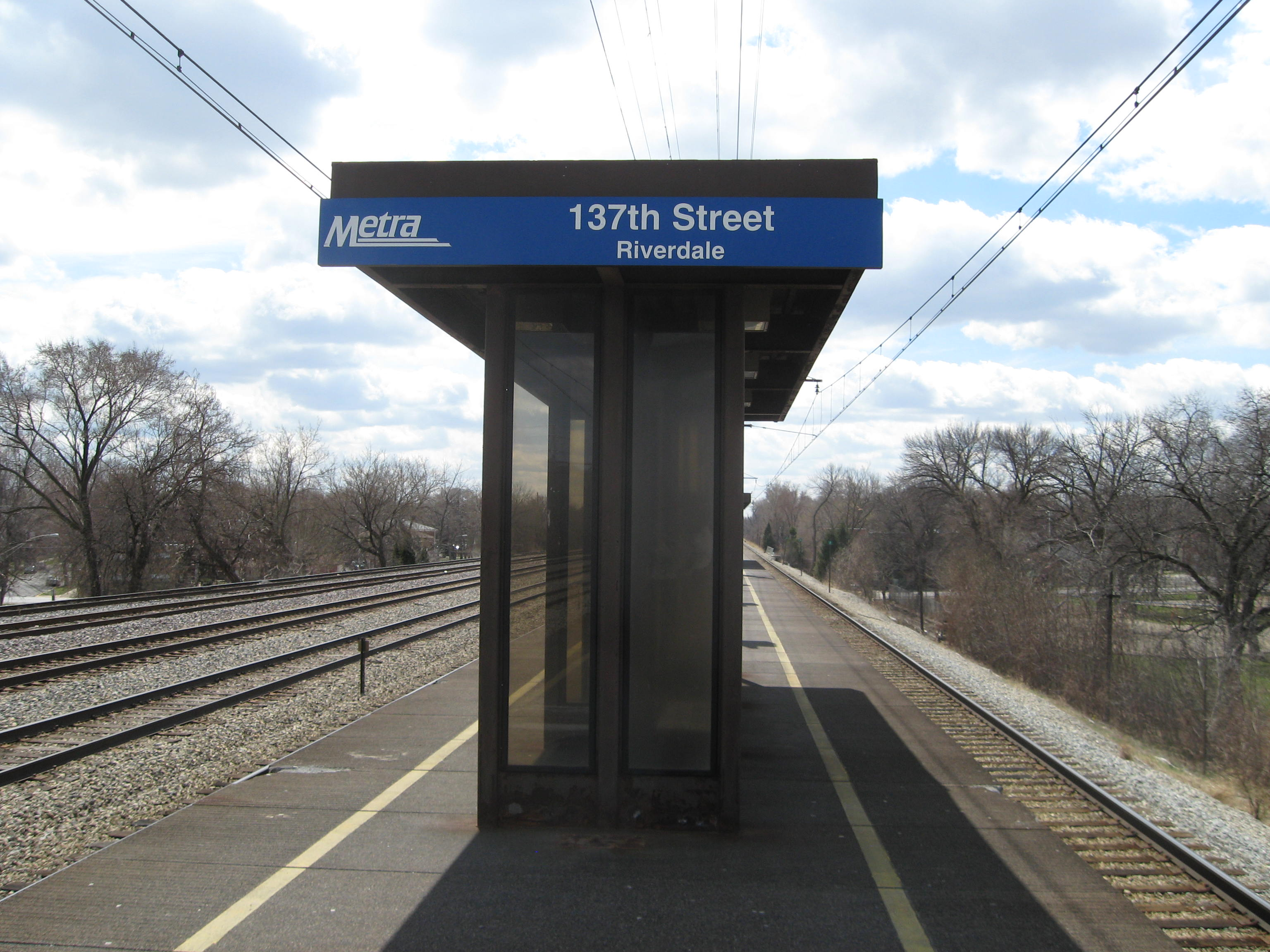
- Riverdale station in April 2011.

General information
- Location: 100 West 137th Street; Riverdale, Illinois
- Coordinates: 41.6465°N 87.6234°W
- Owner: Metra
- Line: University Park Sub District
- Platforms: 1 island platform
- Tracks: 2
- Connections: Pace Buses

Construction
- Structure type: Elevated
- Parking: Yes
- Accessible: No

Other information
- Fare zone: 2

History
- Electrified: 1926

Passengers
- 2018: 146 (average weekday) ▼18.9%
- Rank: 172 out of 236

Services
Preceding station	Metra	Following station
Ivanhoe toward University Park	Metra Electric Main Line	115th Street/Kensington toward Millennium
Former services
Preceding station	Illinois Central Railroad	Following station
Ivanhoe toward Richton	Electric Suburban Main Line	130th Street (Wildwood) toward Randolph Street
Track layout
Location

Riverdale is one of two commuter rail stations on the Metra Electric main branch in Riverdale, Illinois, a village just southwest of the adjacent Riverdale neighborhood of Chicago, Illinois. The station is located at 137th Street and Illinois Street, and is 17.3 miles (27.8 km) away from the northern terminus at Millennium Station. In Metra's zone-based fare system, Rivedale is in zone 2. As of 2018, Riverdale is the 172nd busiest of Metra's 236 non-downtown stations, with an average of 146 weekday boardings.

Riverdale is the first station south of Kensington/115th Street, where the Blue Island Branch and the South Shore Line split from the right of way. It is built on a bridge embankment south of 137th Street, which also carries Amtrak's City of New Orleans, Illini, and Saluki trains. A wrought-iron fence exists between the sidewalk and the street below the station, and bridges are available beneath the tracks for 137th and 138th Streets. Parking is primarily available along Illinois Street and the railroad tracks between 137th and 139th Streets, but street-side parking can also be found on the opposite side of Illinois Street between 137th Street and 137th Place, and along 137th Street west of the railroad bridge.

== Bus connections ==
Pace

- 348 Harvey/Riverdale/Blue Island (weekdays only)
