= Calumet station (Illinois) =

Commuter rail station in East Hazel Crest, Illinois

Calumet

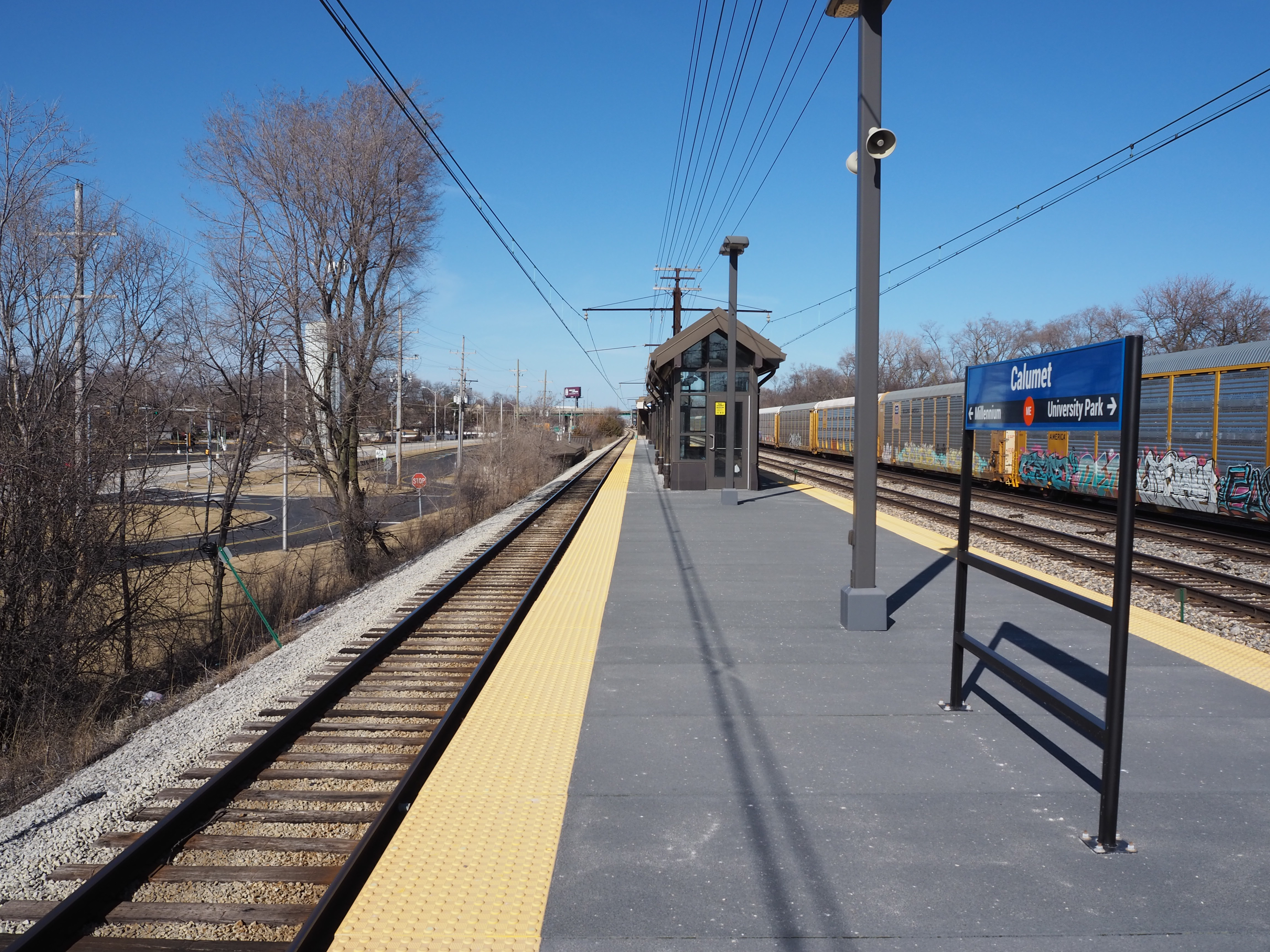
- Calumet station in March 2025.

General information
- Location: Park Avenue and 174th Street; East Hazel Crest, Illinois
- Coordinates: 41.572669°N 87.662799°W
- Owner: Metra
- Line: University Park Sub District
- Platforms: 1 island platform
- Tracks: 2 tracks
- Connections: Pace

Construction
- Structure type: Elevated
- Parking: Yes
- Cycle facilities: Yes; Bicycle racks
- Accessible: Yes

Other information
- Fare zone: 2

History
- Opened: 1856
- Electrified: 1926

Passengers
- 2018: 1,077 (average weekday) ▲8.9%
- Rank: 46 out of 236

Services
| Preceding station | Metra | Following station |
|---|---|---|
| Homewood toward University Park | Metra Electric Main Line | Hazel Crest toward Millennium |
Former services
| Preceding station | Illinois Central Railroad | Following station |
|---|---|---|
| Homewood toward Richton | Electric Suburban Main Line | Hazel Crest toward Randolph Street |
Track layout
Location

Calumet is a station on Metra's Metra Electric District located in East Hazel Crest, Illinois. The station is officially located at Park Avenue and 174th Street, near the Calumet Country Club, however the actual location is on Wood Street south of 174th Street. Park Avenue terminates at 171st Street. Calumet is 22.8 miles (36.7 km) from Millennium Station, the northern terminus of the Metra Electric District. In Metra's zone-based fare system, Calumet is located in zone 2. As of 2018, Calumet is the 46th busiest of Metra's 236 non-downtown stations, with an average of 1,077 weekday boardings. The station is on a solid-fill elevated structure and consists of one island platform which serves the Metra Electric District's two tracks. There is no agent at Calumet, but tickets may be purchased from a vending machine in the waiting room.

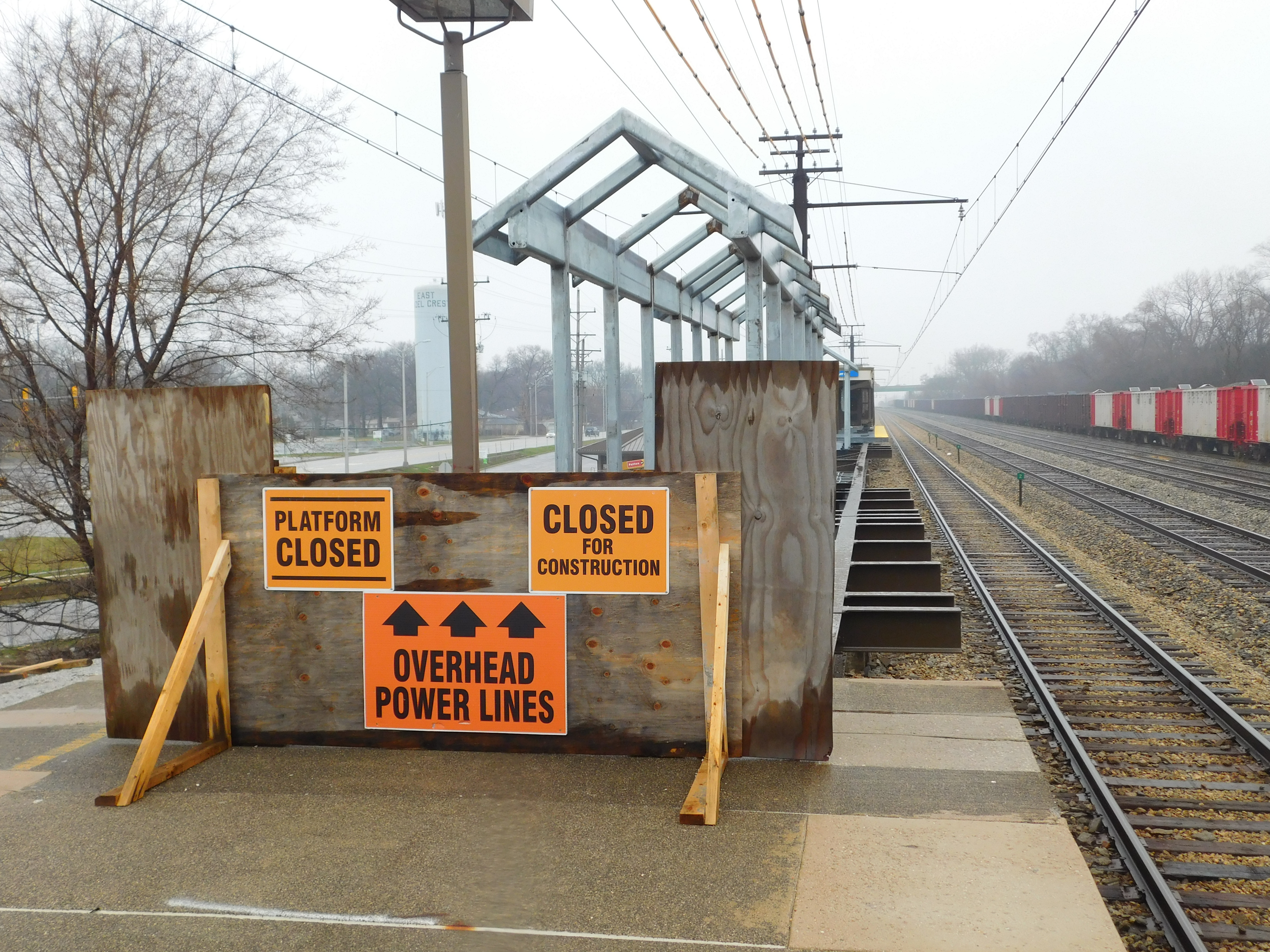
Calumet station platform during reconstruction
