= Campus (train) =

Discontinued Amtrak train in Illinois

Overview
- Service type: Inter-city rail
- Status: Discontinued
- Locale: Illinois
- First service: November 14, 1971
- Last service: March 5, 1972
- Successor: Illini
- Former operator(s): Amtrak

Route
- Termini: Chicago; Champaign-Urbana
- Stops: 2
- Distance travelled: 127 miles (204 km)
- Average journey time: 2 hours 10 minutes
- Service frequency: Friday/Sunday
- Train number(s): 394 and 395

On-board services
- Catering facilities: On-board cafe

Technical
- Track gauge: 4 ft 8 1/2 in (1,435 mm)
- Track owner(s): Illinois Central

The Campus was a short lived passenger train operated by Amtrak between Chicago and Champaign, Illinois. The Chicago-Champaign corridor already saw two trains daily: the Shawnee (Chicago-Carbondale) and the Panama Limited (Chicago-New Orleans). The Campus made a round-trip Friday and Sunday, serving the University of Illinois at Urbana–Champaign. A second train, the Illini, made a Friday trip. The Campus first appeared on the November 14, 1971, timetable, the first timetable Amtrak issued with its own numbers. Amtrak discontinued the Campus and Illini on March 5, 1972. Both trains had used Central Station, which Amtrak was abandoning; Amtrak judged that the additional 35–40 minutes necessary to serve Union Station made the schedule impractical. The Campus was the last passenger train to use Central Station.
