= 147th Street/Sibley station =

Commuter rail station in Harvey, Illinois

147th/Sibley

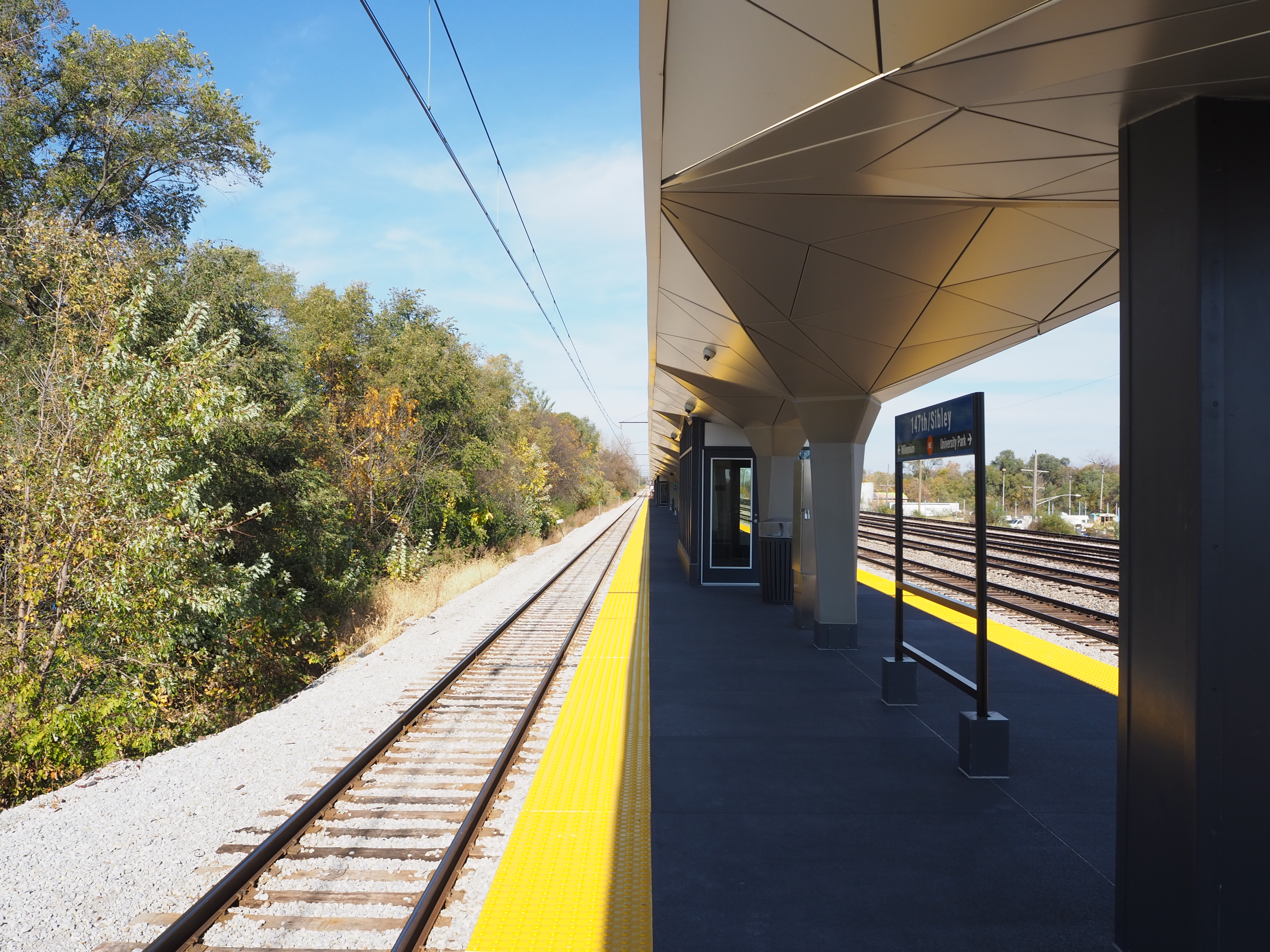
- 147th Street station in November 2024, after the completion of renovations

General information
- Location: 147th Street and Clinton Street; Harvey, Illinois
- Coordinates: 41.6232°N 87.6358°W
- Owner: Metra
- Line: University Park Sub District
- Platforms: 1 island platform
- Tracks: 2
- Connections: Pace Buses

Construction
- Parking: Yes
- Accessible: Yes

Other information
- Fare zone: 2

History
- Rebuilt: 2022–2024
- Electrified: 1926

Passengers
- 2018: 829 (average weekday) ▼15.6%
- Rank: 62 out of 236

Services
Preceding station	Metra	Following station
Harvey toward University Park	Metra Electric Main Line	Ivanhoe toward Millennium
Former services
Preceding station	Illinois Central Railroad	Following station
Harvey toward Richton	Electric Suburban Main Line	Ivanhoe toward Randolph Street
Track layout
Location

147th Street/Sibley station is one of two Metra Electric District stations located on its Main Branch in Harvey, Illinois. The station is located on 147th Street (IL 83, also known as Sibley Boulevard), and Clinton Street, and is 19.0 miles (30.6 km) away from the northern terminus at Millennium Station. In Metra's zone-based fare system, 147th Street-Sibley Boulevard station is in zone 2. As of 2018, the station is the 62nd busiest of Metra's 236 non-downtown stations, with an average of 829 weekday boardings. The 2022–2024 station reconstruction was designed by Gannett Fleming TranSystems (GFT) and later received both an AIA Chicago Design Excellence Award and an AIA Illinois Honor Award.

The station is named after both of the names for Illinois Route 83 in Harvey; Sibley Boulevard, and 147th Street. The bridge over Route 83 has a clearance of 13 ft 10 in (4.22 m), and part of the waiting room is built underneath the north side of the bridge. A large parking lot exists on the east side of the tracks between 147th Street and the Little Calumet River. A smaller parking lot exists on the southwest corner of Clinton and 146th Streets on the west side of the tracks.

== History ==
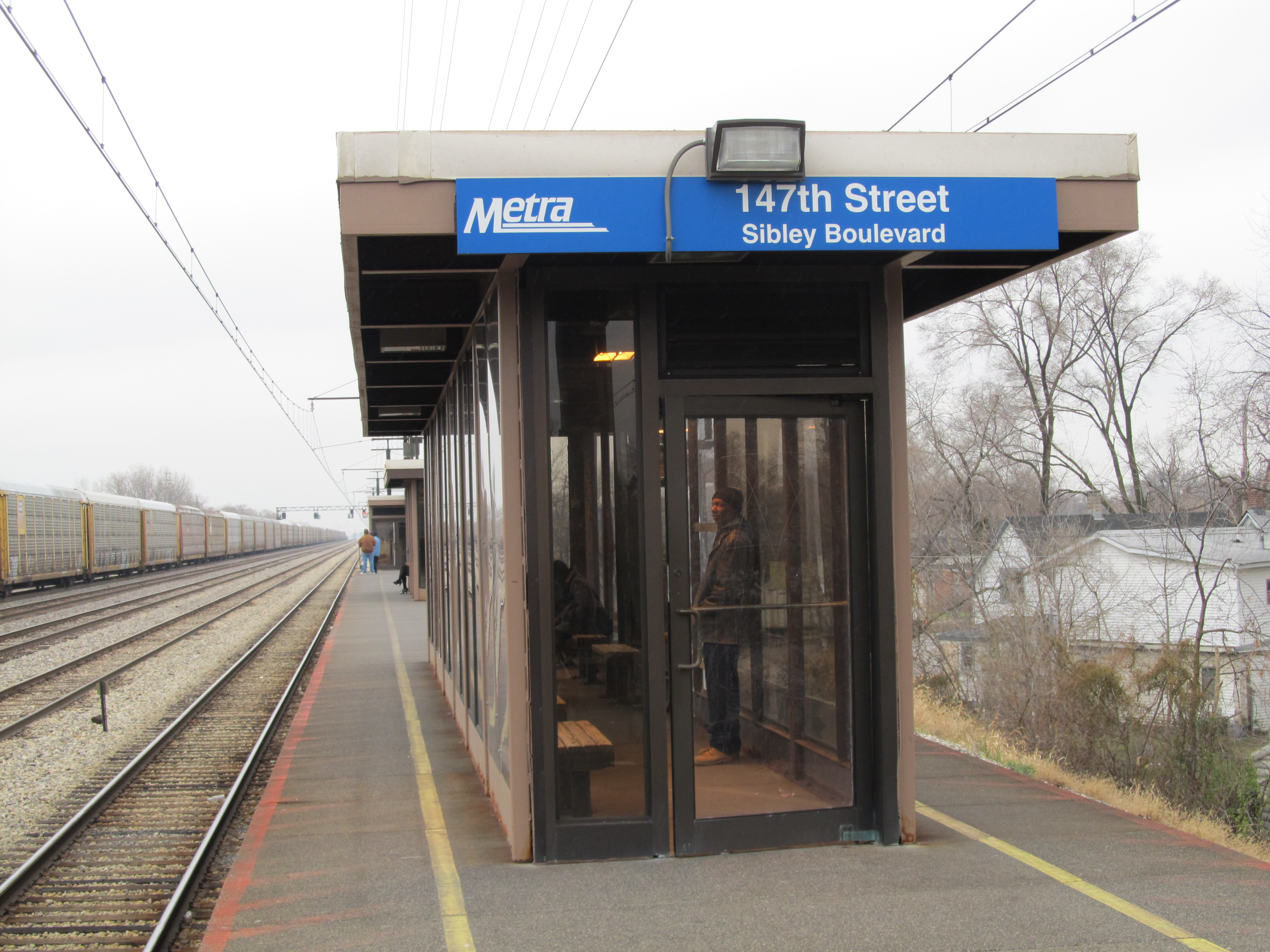
The station in December 2011, before it was renovated 11 years later in May 2022

In November 2021, IHC Construction Companies LLC received a $13 million contract to rebuild the station, marking the first major renovation in over thirty years.

The station underwent a $20.8 million renovation from May 16, 2022, to October 28, 2024. Enhancements included the addition of bicycle parking, a kiss-and-ride area, and an elevator to improve accessibility. Construction was originally anticipated to finish in spring 2023. It was ultimately postponed to October 28, 2024, marking the station's reopening.

== Bus connections ==
Pace

- 350 Sibley
- 352 Halsted (24/7 service)
