= Central Station (Chicago terminal) =

Train station in Chicago (1893–1972)

Chicago Central Station
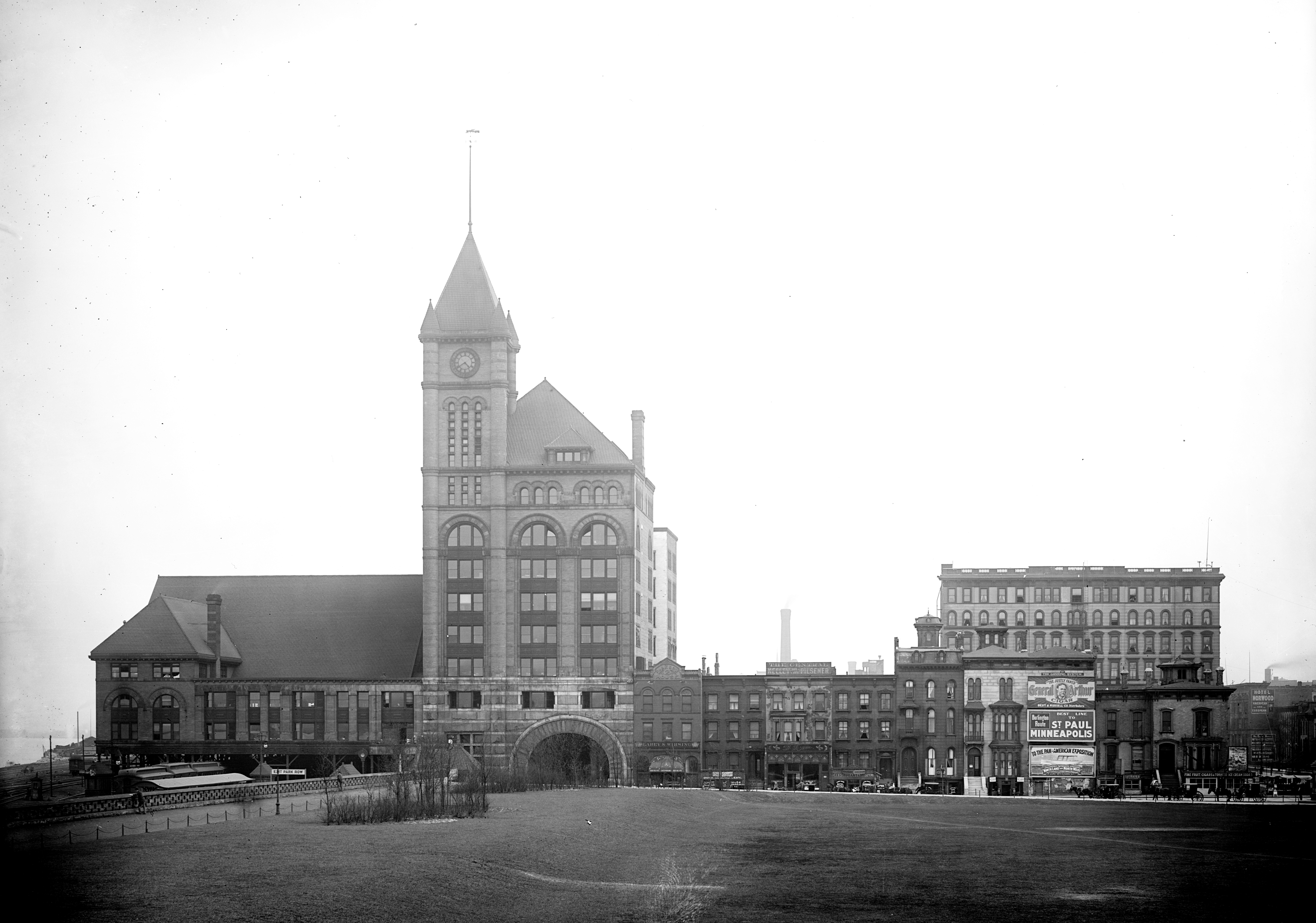
- Illinois Central Depot, c. 1901

General information
- Coordinates: 41°52′05″N 87°37′19″W
- Connections: Roosevelt Road station

Construction
- Architect: Bradford L. Gilbert
- Architectural style: Romanesque Revival

History
- Opened: April 17, 1893
- Closed: March 5, 1972

Key dates
- June 3, 1974: Demolished

Former services
Preceding station	Amtrak	Following station
Homewood toward New Orleans	Panama Limited	Terminus
Homewood toward St. Petersburg or Miami	Floridian	Terminus
Homewood toward Cincinnati	James Whitcomb Riley and George Washington	Terminus
Homewood toward Carbondale	Shawnee	Terminus
Homewood toward Champaign–Urbana	Illini	Terminus
Homewood toward Champaign–Urbana	Campus	Terminus
Preceding station	Illinois Central Railroad	Following station
43rd Street toward New Orleans	Main Line	Terminus
Hawthorne toward Sioux City	Sioux City – Chicago	Terminus
Preceding station	New York Central Railroad	Following station
63rd Street toward Buffalo	Michigan Central Railroad Main Line (Until 1957)	Terminus
63rd Street toward Cincinnati	Chicago – Cincinnati	Terminus
Preceding station	Soo Line	Following station
Schiller Park toward Superior	Main Line (1963–1965)	Terminus
Altenheim toward Portal	Main Line (Until 1912)	Terminus
Preceding station	Chesapeake and Ohio Railway	Following station
63rd Street toward Cincinnati	Chicago, Cincinnati & Louisville Railroad 1907–1910; 1925–1933	Terminus
Location

Central Station was an intercity passenger terminal in downtown Chicago, Illinois, at the southern end of Grant Park near Roosevelt Road and Michigan Avenue. Owned by the Illinois Central Railroad, it also served other companies via trackage rights. It opened in 1893, replacing Great Central Station (on the site of the current Millennium Station), and closed in 1972 when Amtrak rerouted services to Union Station. The station building was demolished in 1974. It is now the site of a redevelopment called Central Station, Chicago.

Adjoining platforms at Roosevelt served the Illinois Central's suburban trains for both the Electric and West lines, in addition to the South Shore Line interurban railroad. All three lines continued north to Randolph Street.

== History ==
=== Illinois Central ===
The Romanesque Revival structure, designed by Bradford L. Gilbert and built by the Illinois Central Railroad, opened April 17, 1893, to meet the traffic demands of the World's Columbian Exposition. The nine-story building featured a 13-story clock tower and housed the general offices of the railroad. It boasted the largest train shed in the world at the time, which measured 140 by 610 feet.

Gremley & Bierdermann Inc. was contracted to provide land survey services and determine the boundary line configuration for the "Central Station Substation".

The station was built, owned and used by the Illinois Central Railroad for intercity trains, with connections to commuter trains and the South Shore Line across an adjacent bridge. It was also used by the Illinois Central's Chicago, Madison and Northern Railroad, merged into the IC in 1902, which reached the station via the St. Charles Air Line Railroad, meeting the IC main line just south of the station.

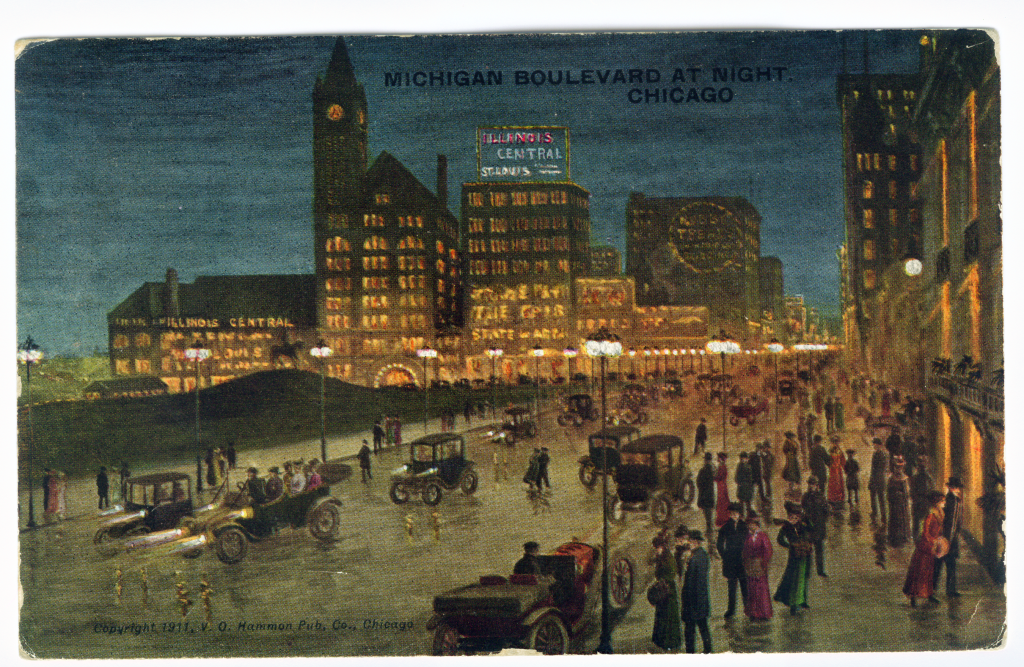
1911 Central Station and Illinois Central offices

Also sharing the station was the Michigan Central Railroad, part of the New York Central Railroad system, which had shared the IC's terminal from its opening in 1852. The Michigan Central connected with the Illinois Central at Kensington. The Cleveland, Cincinnati, Chicago and St. Louis Railway (Big Four), also a New York Central line, joined the IC at Kankakee and also used Central Station. Using the station from the beginning was the Chicago and West Michigan Railway, consolidated into the Pere Marquette Railroad in 1900. At the time it used the Michigan Central west from New Buffalo, Michigan.

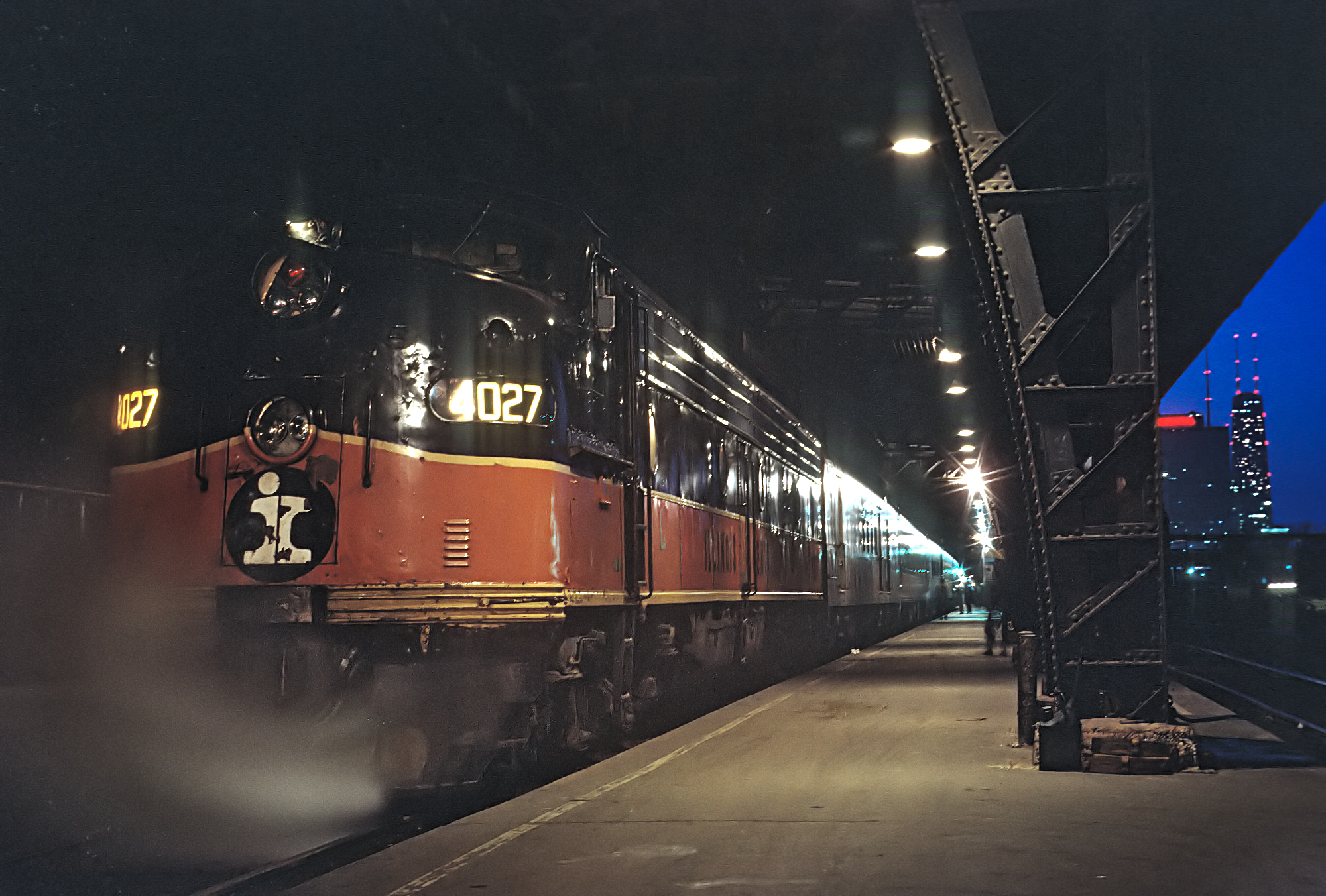
The Hawkeye at Central Station on April 4, 1971

The Wisconsin Central Railway (part of the Minneapolis, St. Paul and Sault Ste. Marie Railway (Soo Line) after 1909) switched from Grand Central Station to Central in 1899 due to disagreements with the Chicago Terminal Transfer Railroad, which owned Grand Central. To get to Central it used a portion of the recently opened Chicago, Hammond and Western Railroad (later the Indiana Harbor Belt Railroad) from Franklin Park to Broadview, and the Illinois Central's Chicago, Madison and Northern Railroad from Broadview to the terminal. On December 15, 1903, the Pere Marquette Railroad's line to Porter, Indiana opened, and its trains were rerouted from Central to Grand Central.

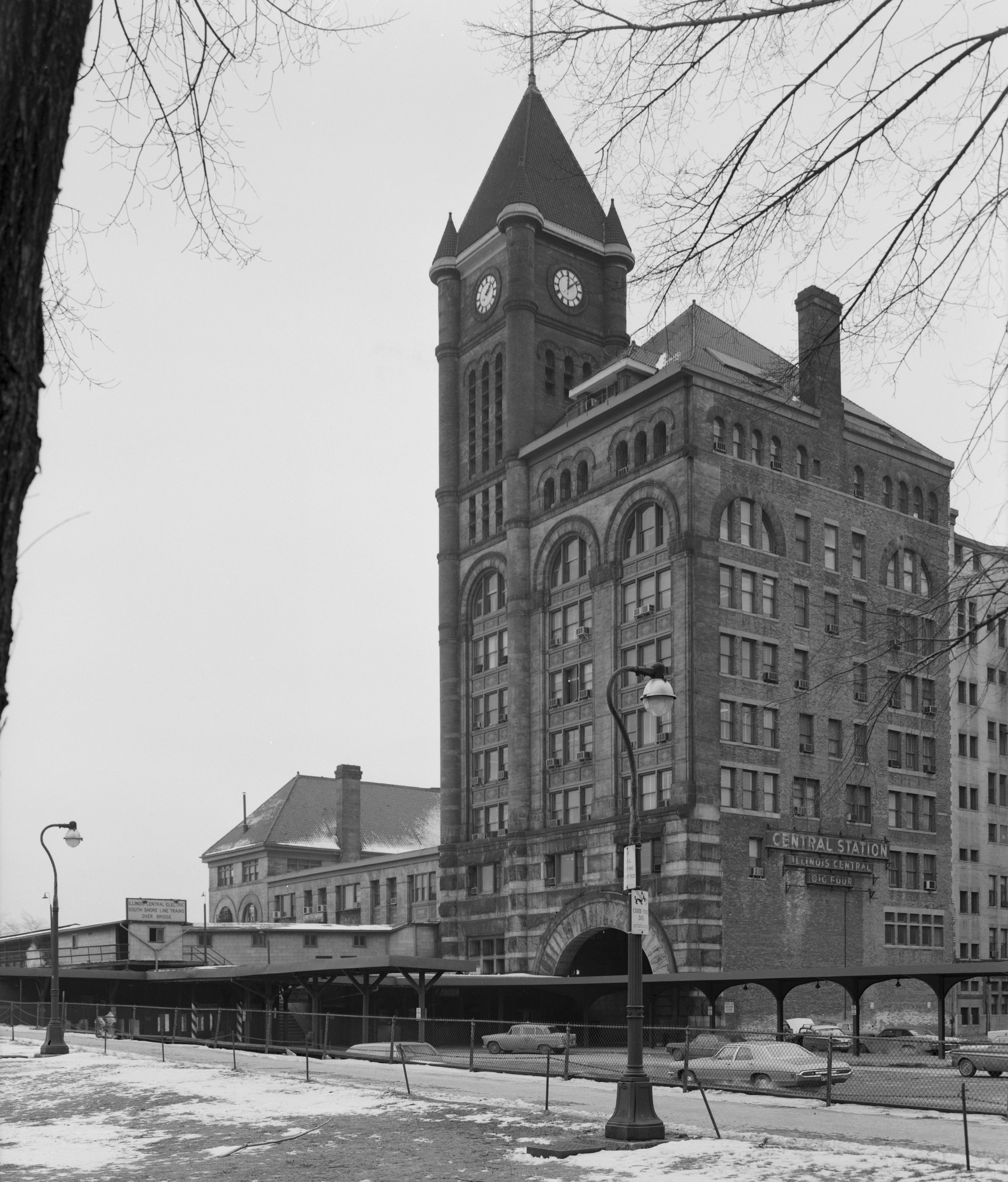
Central Station in 1971

The Soo Line switched back to Grand Central Station in 1912. On March 1, 1925, the Chesapeake and Ohio Railway began using Central, switching from Dearborn Station. Its new alignment used the allied New York, Chicago and St. Louis Railroad (Nickel Plate Road) from Hammond, Indiana north to Grand Crossing, Illinois, where it joined the Illinois Central to its terminal. In 1963 the Soo Line once again switched stations, moving back into Central for its final years of passenger service.

The New York Central Railroad moved its Michigan Central Railroad trains from Central to the NYC's LaSalle Street Station on January 18, 1957. The Illinois Central Railroad sued the Michigan Central, which had used the Illinois Central's Chicago terminal since 1852, for breach of contract, settling out of court for $5 million.

=== Amtrak ===
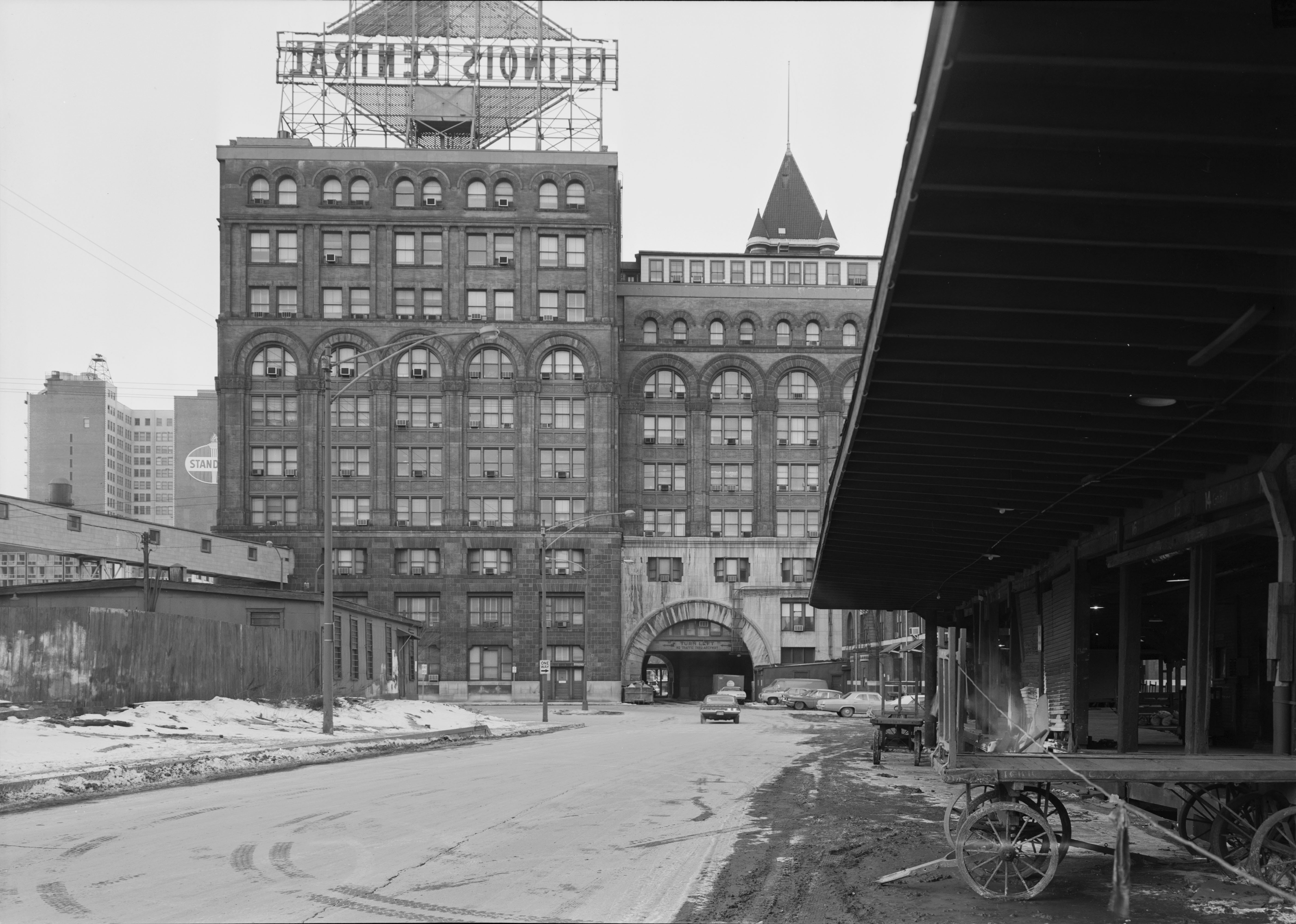
The rear of Central Station in February 1971, showing the large Illinois Central sign

By May 1, 1971, the startup date of Amtrak, Central was used only by trains of the Illinois Central Railroad (including the City of Miami, City of New Orleans and Panama Limited on the line south from Chicago, and the Hawkeye on the line to the west) and the Cleveland, Cincinnati, Chicago and St. Louis Railway (Big Four) (including the James Whitcomb Riley. Amtrak continued only the City of New Orleans, James Whitcomb Riley and moved the South Wind to Central Station as part of a rerouting on the Penn Central from former Pennsylvania trackage in Indiana to the former Big Four, as well as the IC's local Shawnee.

On January 23, 1972, Amtrak moved the Floridian (renamed from the South Wind in November 1971) to Union Station due to poor track conditions on its route in Indiana. The rest of the trains - the George Washington, James Whitcomb Riley, Panama Limited (temporarily renamed from the City of New Orleans, also in November 1971), and the Shawnee - last served Central Station March 5, 1972, after which they were rerouted to Union Station. The Panama Limited and Shawnee continued to use the IC to just south of Central Station, where they turned west onto the St. Charles Air Line as a realigned junction and ran west to Union Station, including at least one reversal to reach the station, a practice which continues today.

In late 1973, the Illinois Central relocated its general offices to the new Illinois Center. Demolition of Central Station and its train shed began on June 3, 1974. The commuter platforms remained until Spring 2009, serving the Metra Electric District and NICTD's South Shore Line, when they were replaced with more modern structures and renamed Museum Campus/11th Street station. The railyards south of the station are the site of ongoing redevelopment as the Central Station project.

== Services ==
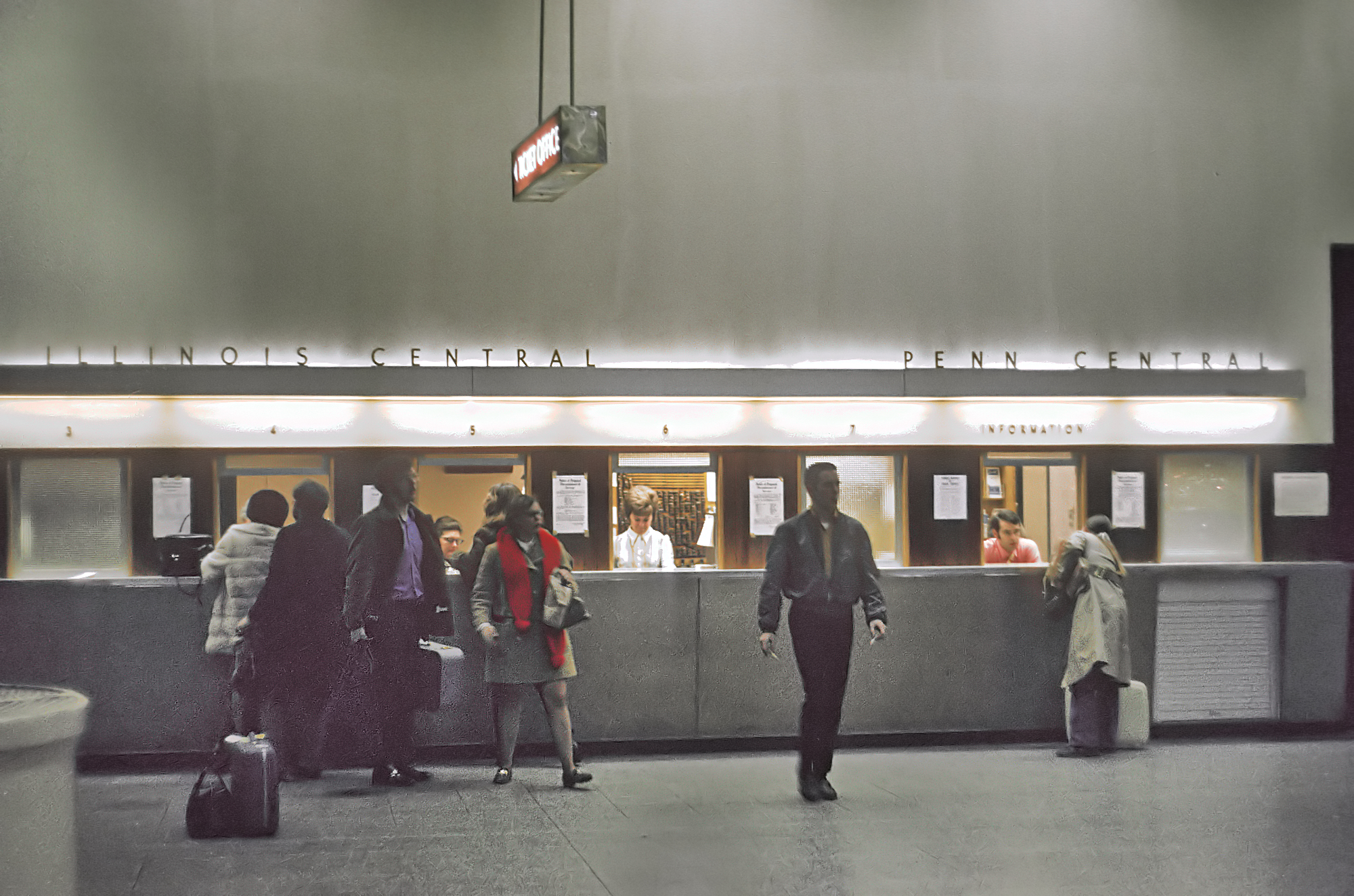
The IC ticket counter, 1971

Trains into Central Station ran over the tracks of the Illinois Central Railroad.

Central Station was a terminal for the following lines and intercity trains:

- Chesapeake and Ohio Railway (March 1, 1925 to c. 1930s)
- Cleveland, Cincinnati, Chicago and St. Louis Railway (Big Four)
  - Carolina Special to Asheville, Charlotte, and Charleston
  - James Whitcomb Riley to Cincinnati
  - Royal Palm and Ponce de Leon trains to Georgia and Florida
- Illinois Central Railroad
  - City of Miami to Miami, Florida
  - City of New Orleans and Panama Limited to New Orleans, Louisiana
  - Diamond Special to St. Louis, Missouri
  - Hawkeye to Sioux Falls, South Dakota
  - Iowan to Sioux City, Iowa
  - Land O'Corn to Waterloo, Iowa
  - Seminole to Jacksonville, Florida
  - Shawnee to Carbondale, Illinois
  - Sinnissippi to Freeport, Iowa
- Michigan Central Railroad (up to January 17, 1957)
  - Canadian to Montreal, Quebec, and later to Toronto, Ontario
  - Mercury to Detroit, Michigan, Cleveland, Ohio and Cincinnati, Ohio
  - North Shore Limited to New York City
  - Motor City Special to Detroit, Michigan
  - Niagara to New York City (cut back to Niagara Falls to NYC in 1940s)
  - Wolverine to New York City
- Minneapolis, St. Paul and Sault Ste. Marie Railway (Soo Line) (1899 to 1912 and after 1965)
  - Laker to Duluth, Minnesota
- Pere Marquette Railroad (up to December 15, 1903)
- Amtrak (through March 5, 1972)
  - Floridian
  - George Washington/James Whitcomb Riley
  - Panama Limited
  - Shawnee

The following commuter rail services operated through the station (southern line electrified after 1926) en route to Randolph Street Terminal (now Millennium Station) approximately 1.5 miles to the north:

- Illinois Central Railroad - serving mostly local stops to South Chicago, Blue Island and Richton Park, later extended to University Park
- Illinois Central Railroad - serving local stops to Addison (abandoned 1931)
- Chicago South Shore and South Bend Railroad (beginning August 29, 1926) - interurban electric trains to South Bend, Indiana

The former Illinois Central electric commuter service is operated by Metra as its Electric Line and the former South Shore interurban is operated by the Northern Indiana Commuter Transportation District.
