= Great Central Station =

Train station in Chicago (1856–93)

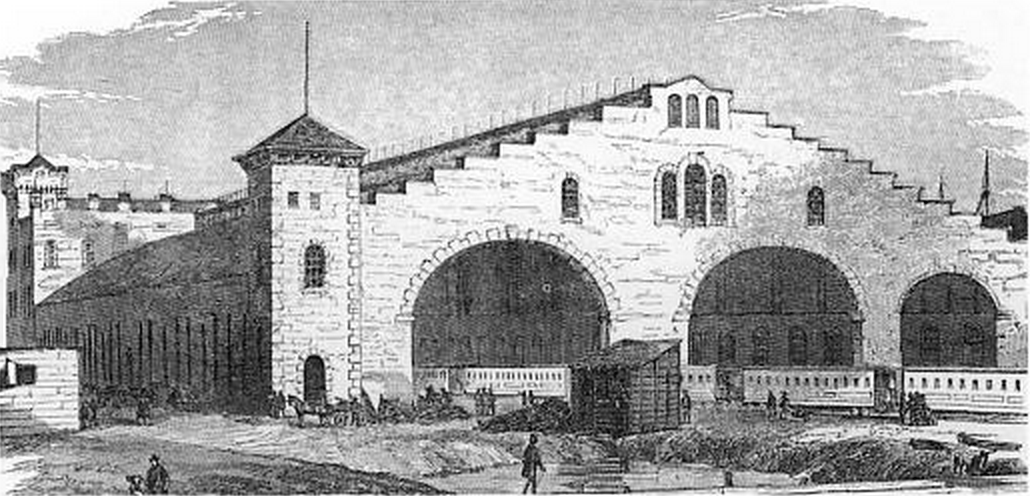
- Illustration of the rail house train shed which appeared in Frank Leslie's Illustrated Newspaper in 1856, shortly after the station opened.

General information
- Location: South Water Street and Michigan Avenue, Chicago, Illinois
- Coordinates: 41°53′10″N 87°37′24″W
- Owner: Illinois Central Railroad

Construction
- Architect: Otto H. Matz

Other information
- Status: Demolished

History
- Opened: June 1, 1856
- Closed: April 17, 1893

Former services
| Preceding station | Illinois Central Railroad | Following station |
|---|---|---|
| 16th Street toward New Orleans | Main Line | Terminus |
| Preceding station | Michigan Central Railroad | Following station |
| 22nd Street toward Buffalo–Exchange Street | Main Line | Terminus |
| Preceding station | Cleveland, Cincinnati, Chicago and St. Louis Railway | Following station |
| 22nd Street toward Cincinnati | Chicago – Cincinnati | Terminus |
| Preceding station | Burlington Route | Following station |
| Indiana Avenue Closed 1880s toward Denver | Main Line | Terminus |
Location

Great Central Station, also known as Great Central Depot, (Note: Contemporary sources referred to the "Great Central Depot" or "Central Depot", but secondary sources call it the "Great Central Station".) was an intercity train station in Chicago, Illinois, owned by the Illinois Central Railroad (IC). It opened in 1856 and for a time was the largest building in downtown Chicago. Its passenger depot building was located on Water Street. The IC had its headquarters in offices above the depot, while beyond the depot was the large rail house where eight track lines ran. It was damaged in the Great Chicago Fire of 1871 but remained in operation.

The station proved inadequate to handle growing traffic and its original building was demolished in 1893 in favor of the new Central Station at the southern end of Grant Park. Although it continued to receive some traffic, over time it increasingly became a commuter rail depot. Millennium Station, formerly Randolph Street Terminal, sits on the location.

== Design ==
The station was designed by Otto H. Matz and included both a head house and a train shed. The most distinctive feature of the train shed was the three masonry arches fronting the wooden structure. Architectural historian Carroll Meeks criticized the front of the head house, calling it an "ill-assorted complex of disparate elements." Carl W. Condit cited the design as an example of vernacular architecture.

The train shed incorporated a Howe truss in its design and measured 166 feet (51 m) wide and 36 feet (11 m) high. Only Birmingham New Street railway station had a wider roof. On its completion the station was the largest building in Chicago. In 1871, the Great Chicago Fire destroyed the train shed, which was never rebuilt. A subsequent fire in 1874 damaged the head house.

== Services ==
Great Central Station officially opened on June 1, 1856, replacing a temporary structure that had been in place since 1853. It was the Illinois Central's first permanent station in Chicago and cost US$250,000. The Great Central originally served the Illinois Central, Michigan Central, Burlington Route, and Galena and Chicago Union (a predecessor to the Chicago and North Western). The G&CU was a tenant for less than a year, while the Burlington moved to the new Union Depot (predecessor to today's Union Station) in 1881. Predecessors of the Cleveland, Cincinnati, Chicago and St. Louis Railway (the "Big Four") reached the depot in 1872 via trackage rights from Kankakee. The depot was used until 1893.

Traffic peaked at 100 intercity passenger trains per day in the early 1890s, not including suburban (what would now be called commuter) trains. The Illinois Central constructed a new facility, Central Station, to meet the traffic demands of the World's Columbian Exposition. That station opened on April 17, 1893, and Great Central was demolished. Suburban trains continued to stop north of Central Station where Millennium Station now stands.
