= Shawnee (train) =

American passenger train

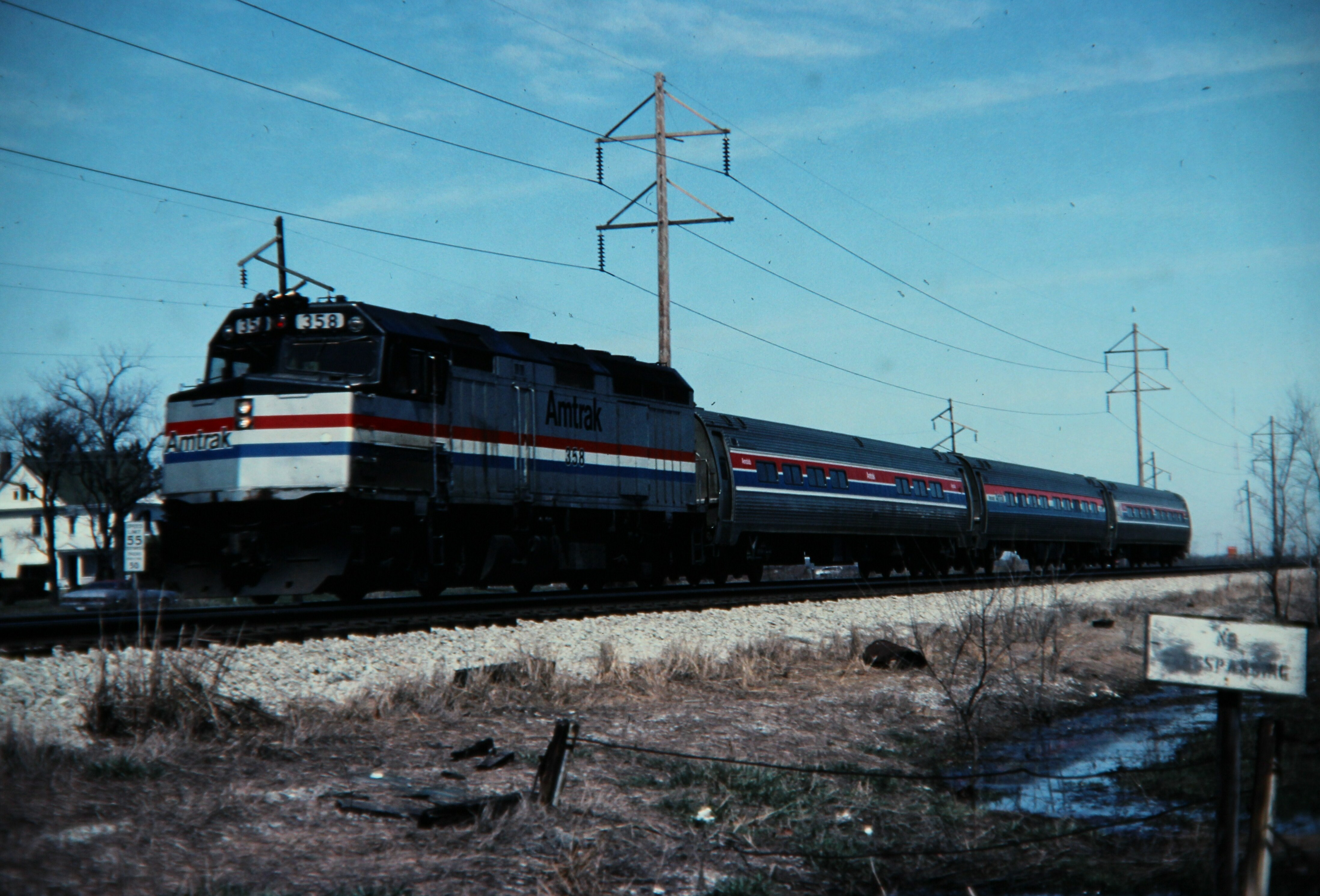
- The Shawnee at Savoy in April 1984

Overview
- Predecessor: Seminole
- First service: June 3, 1969
- Last service: January 2, 1986
- Successor: Illini
- Former operator(s): Illinois Central Railroad; Amtrak

The Shawnee was a passenger train operated first by then Illinois Central Railroad and then by Amtrak between Chicago, Illinois and Carbondale, Illinois. It operated from 1969 until 1986.

== History ==
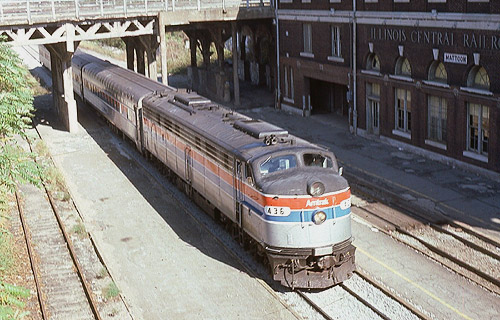
The Shawnee at Mattoon in February 1976

The Shawnee took its name from the Shawnee, an Algonquian-speaking people native to North America who formerly lived in southern Illinois. The train made its first run on June 3, 1969. It replaced the Seminole, a long-distance train which had operated between Chicago and Jacksonville since 1909. At the dawn of Amtrak the Shawnee was one of several trains the Illinois Central operated over the Chicago—Carbondale corridor, including the Southern Express, Creole, and Louisiane. Along with the Panama Limited, also retained from the IC, the Shawnee continued to use Central Station instead of Union Station in downtown Chicago. The train was one of the few Illinois Central trains Amtrak retained after the end of most private-sector passenger service in the United States on May 1, 1971.

Its rolling stock consisted of inherited Illinois Central Gulf locomotives and passenger cars, but in 1976 they were replaced with GE P30CHes and Amfleets and for a brief time, they used Superliner cars. The 1980s most likely saw introduction of EMD F40PHs and retaining of Amfleets, as the Superliners were sent on other routes.

On October 12, 1979, a northbound train was involved in an accident at Harvey, Illinois, when the train collided with a stationary ICG freight train due to misaligned switches, claiming the lives of two people.

The Shawnee operated until January 12, 1986, when budget cuts led to its consolidation with the Illini. A second round trip was added back in 2006, renamed the Saluki.
