= Hazel Crest station =

Commuter rail station in Hazel Crest, Illinois

Hazel Crest

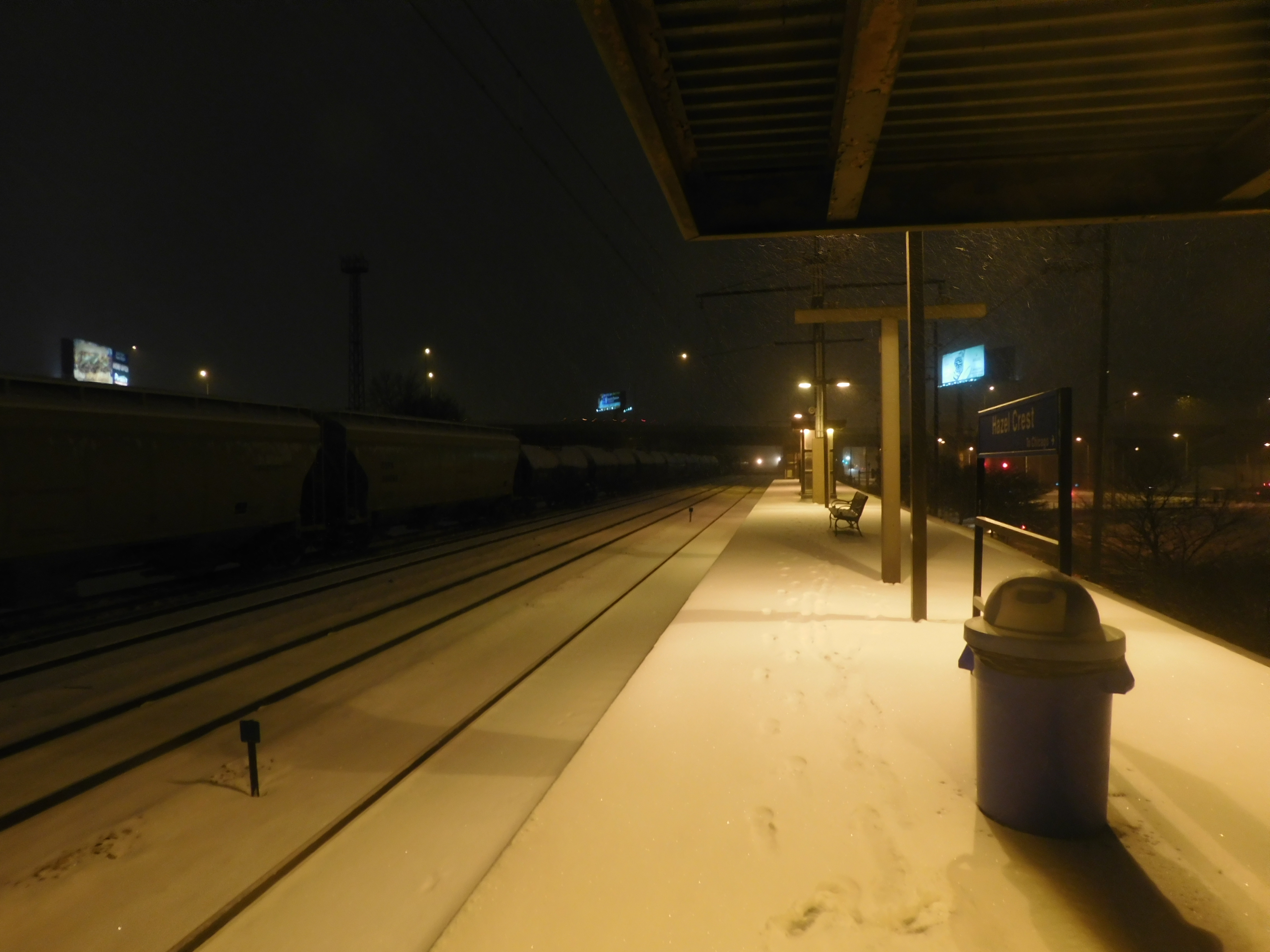
- Hazel Crest station in February 2016.

General information
- Location: Park Avenue and 170th Street; Hazel Crest, Illinois
- Coordinates: 41.580764°N 87.658491°W
- Owner: Metra
- Line: University Park Sub District
- Platforms: 1 island platform
- Tracks: 2 tracks
- Connections: Pace bus

Construction
- Structure type: Elevated
- Parking: Yes
- Accessible: Yes

Other information
- Fare zone: 2

History
- Opened: 1856
- Electrified: 1926

Passengers
- 2018: 261 (average weekday) ▼36.7%
- Rank: 154 out of 236

Services
Preceding station	Metra	Following station
Calumet toward University Park	Metra Electric Main Line	Harvey toward Millennium
Former services
Preceding station	Illinois Central Railroad	Following station
Calumet toward Richton	Electric Suburban Main Line	Harvey toward Randolph Street
Track layout
Location

Hazel Crest is a station on Metra's Metra Electric District located in Hazel Crest, Illinois. The station is located at Park Avenue and 170th Street, 22.3 miles (35.9 km) from Millennium Station, the northern terminus of the Metra Electric District. In Metra's zone-based fare system, Hazel Crest is located in zone 2. As of 2018, Hazel Crest is the 154th busiest of Metra's 236 non-downtown stations, with an average of 261 weekday boardings. The station consists of an island platform which serves the Metra Electric District's two tracks. There is a waiting room with a ticket vending machine.

== Bus connections ==
Pace

- 356 Harvey/Homewood/Tinley Park
