= Ivanhoe station (Illinois) =

Commuter rail station in Riverdale, Illinois

Ivanhoe

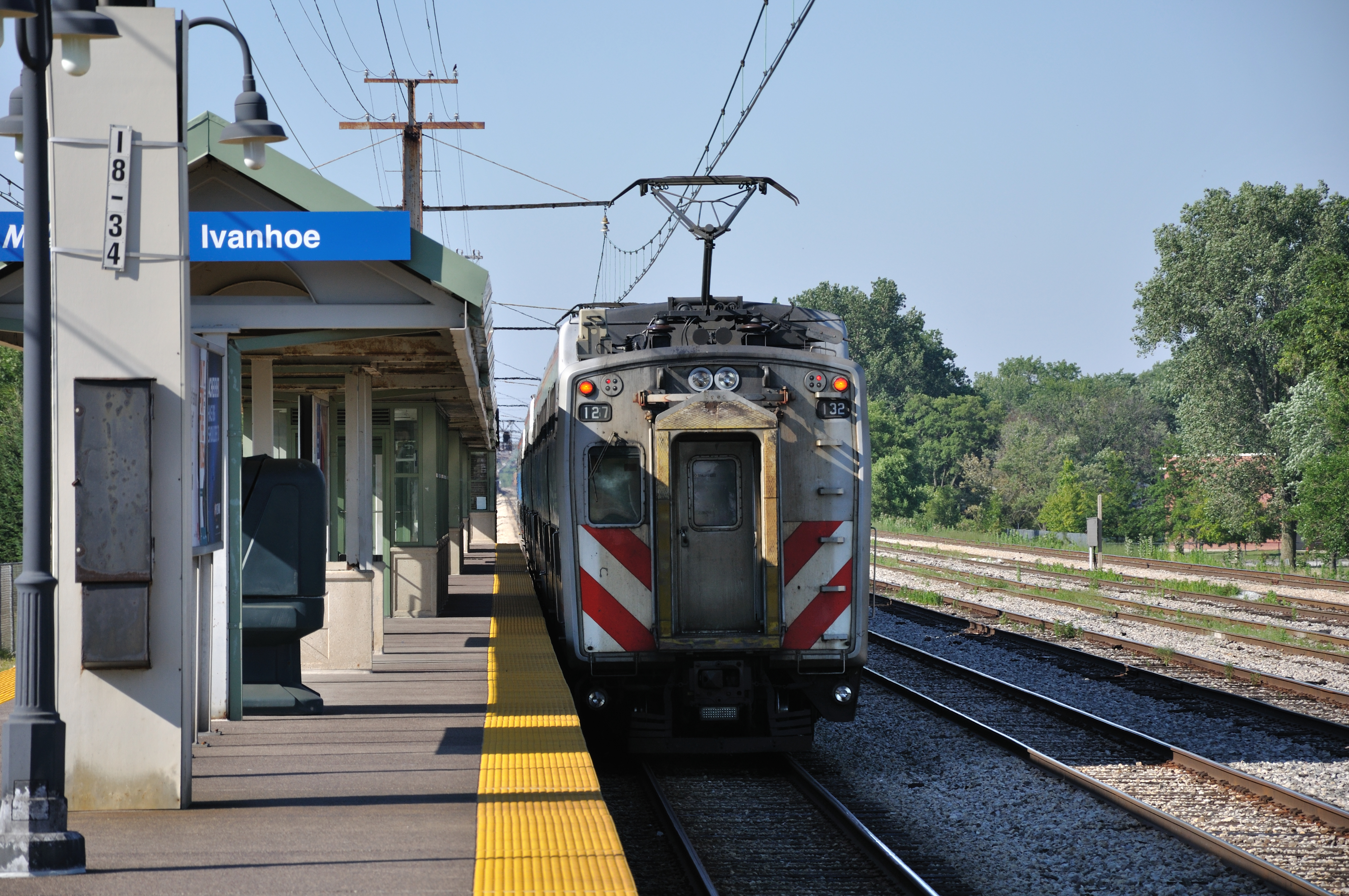
- Ivanhoe station in July 2010

General information
- Location: 144th and Tracy Streets; Riverdale, Illinois
- Coordinates: 41.6332°N 87.6305°W
- Owner: Metra
- Line: University Park Sub District
- Platforms: 1 island platform
- Tracks: 2

Construction
- Parking: Yes
- Cycle facilities: Yes; Bicycle racks
- Accessible: Yes

Other information
- Fare zone: 2

History
- Rebuilt: June 25, 1994
- Electrified: 1926

Passengers
- 2018: 520 (average weekday) ▼17.2%
- Rank: 96 out of 236

Services
Preceding station	Metra	Following station
147th Street/Sibley toward University Park	Metra Electric Main Line	Riverdale toward Millennium
Former services
Preceding station	Illinois Central Railroad	Following station
147th Street toward Richton	Electric Suburban Main Line	137th Street toward Randolph Street
Track layout
Location

Ivanhoe is one of two commuter rail stations on the Metra Electric District main branch in Riverdale, Illinois. The station is located at 144th Street and Tracy Street, and is 18.2 miles (29.3 km) away from the northern terminus at Millennium Station. In Metra's zone-based fare system, Ivanhoe Station is in zone 2. As of 2018, Ivanhoe is the 96th busiest of Metra's 236 non-downtown stations, with an average of 520 weekday boardings.

Like the Riverdale station, Ivanhoe is built on a bridge embankment south of 144th Street, which also carries Amtrak's City of New Orleans, Illini, and Saluki trains. The waiting room is open 24 hours, is located on the north sidewalk, and contains ticket vending machines. Parking is available on the east side of the tracks on primarily north of Illinois Street between 144th and 145th Streets. Another parking lot is available across from this one on 144th Street, and a third can be found off the northeast corner of 144th Street and Atlantic Avenue. Street-side parking can also be found on 145th Street between Illinois Street and Atlantic Avenue in front of C. Kelly Franson Park. No bus connections are available at this station.
