= Seminole (train) =

Passenger train

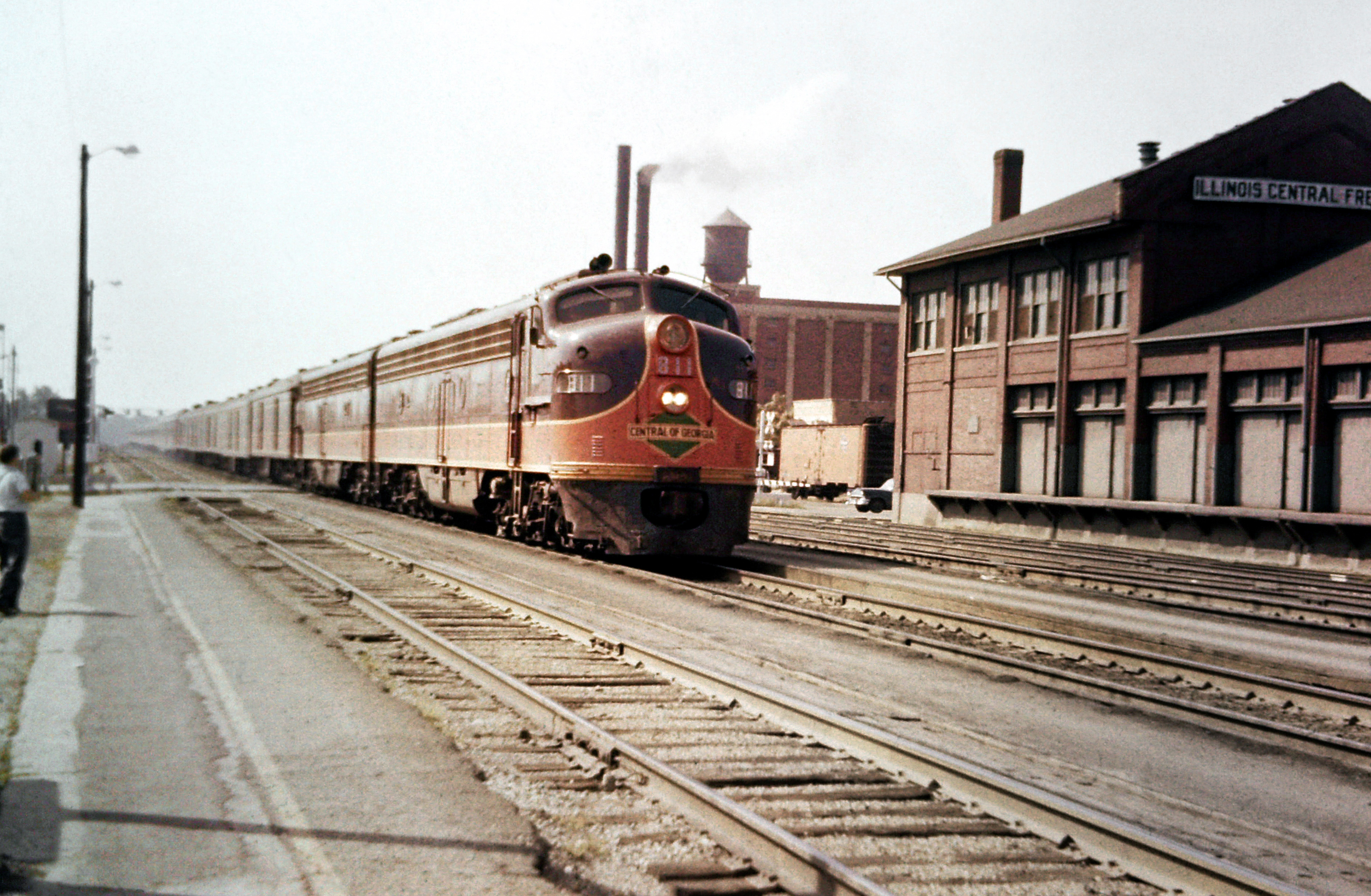
- CG #811, an EMD E8, leads the Seminole into Kankakee, Illinois in 1964.

Overview
- Service type: Inter-city rail
- Status: Discontinued
- Locale: Midwestern United States/Southeastern United States
- First service: November 15, 1909
- Last service: June 3, 1969
- Successor: Shawnee
- Former operators: Illinois Central Railroad; Central of Georgia Railway; Atlantic Coast Line Railroad (to 1967); Seaboard Coast Line Railroad (1967-1969)

Route
- Termini: Chicago, Illinois; Jacksonville, Florida
- Distance travelled: 1,127.9 miles (1,815.2 km)
- Average journey time: 33 hours, 35 minutes, southbound; 22 hours, 15 minutes, northbound (1948)
- Service frequency: Daily
- Train numbers: 9, southbound, 10, northbound

On-board services
- Seating arrangements: Coach seating
- Sleeping arrangements: Sections, compartments and double bedrooms and a drawing room (1955)
- Catering facilities: Dining car

The Seminole, also known as the Seminole Limited, was a passenger train operated by the Illinois Central Railroad, Central of Georgia Railway, and Atlantic Coast Line Railroad between Chicago, Illinois and Jacksonville, Florida. It operated from 1909 to 1969 and was the first year-round service between the two cities.

== History ==
The Illinois Central Railroad, Central of Georgia Railway, and Atlantic Coast Line Railroad introduced the Seminole Limited on November 15, 1909, in time for the winter tourist season. The new train carried coaches, sleeping cars, and a full dining car. Through services included a St. Louis, Missouri–Jacksonville sleeper and a Chicago–Savannah, Georgia sleeper. The train operated on a "two night out" schedule, departing Chicago at 9:00 PM and arriving in Jacksonville at 7:05 AM on the second morning out. This permitted a late afternoon arrival in Birmingham, Alabama. The travel time was 35 hours from Chicago, three hours faster than existing services. The train operated on a daily schedule. The Illinois Central billed it as a "solid, fast through train." From Jacksonville passengers could make connections to other locations in Florida. It was the first year-round service between the two cities.

The African-American dramatist and playwright T. Montgomery Gregory, then a professor at Howard University, rode the Seminole Limited in Georgia in 1915 as part of his investigation into "Jim Crow" (segregated) cars on Southern trains. Gregory noted that even though the segregated cars on the Central of Georgia were "superior" to other railroads and that the Seminole Limited in particular was "one of the most favorable trains in the South", the train's conductor forced him from his coach at three in the morning to make room for whites who wanted to smoke. He was placed in an ostensibly white car which he characterized as "filthy" and the "nastiest...[he] had ever ridden in."

In 1950 the Illinois Central rescheduled the Seminole to depart Chicago at 4:00 PM. This put the southbound train in Birmingham at 8:30 AM and Jacksonville at 9:00 PM.

On July 1, 1967, the ACL merged with its longtime rival, the Seaboard Air Line Railroad. to form the Seaboard Coast Line Railroad; thus, the SCL operated the train over the former ACL route in its final two years.

On June 3, 1969, the Illinois Central truncated the Seminole from Jacksonville to Carbondale and renamed it the Shawnee. The Shawnee would be one of the few Illinois Central trains retained by Amtrak in 1971.

== Equipment ==
In 1952 a typical Seminole carried sleeping cars for five city pairs: Chicago–St. Petersburg, Chicago–Tampa/Sarasota, Chicago–Birmingham, St. Louis–Tampa/Sarasota, and St. Louis–St. Petersburg. With the exception of the Birmingham sleeper these were scheduled for alternate days, so that there was always one sleeper each for Chicago and St. Louis on the one hand, and St. Petersburg and Tampa/Sarasota on the other. Connecting Atlantic Coast Line trains handled the sleepers south of Jacksonville; the Illinois Central's Chickasaw handled the St. Louis sleepers west of Carbondale, Illinois. The sleeping cars each had eight sections, two compartments, and a drawing room. A dining car operated Chicago–Jacksonville and a buffet-lounge Carbondale–St. Louis. For the final Albany, Georgia to Jacksonville leg of the trip, the train ran in tandem, with the matching departure times for the itinerary of the Louisville & Nashville's Flamingo.

Coach passengers would need to transfer at Jacksonville Union Station to respective connecting Atlantic Coast Line and Florida East Coast Railway coach cars. Illinois Central, Atlantic Coast Line and Florida East Coast Railway timetables indicate that the matching FEC train in Jacksonville for the trips south and north was the FEC's Havana Special.

== Cultural influence ==
The Seminole was a likely influence on blues guitarist Tampa Red's song "Seminole Blues":

"My baby’s gone, she won’t be back no more/She left this mornin’, she caught that Seminole"
