= 87th Street/Woodruff station =

Commuter rail station in Chicago, Illinois

87th Street/Woodruff

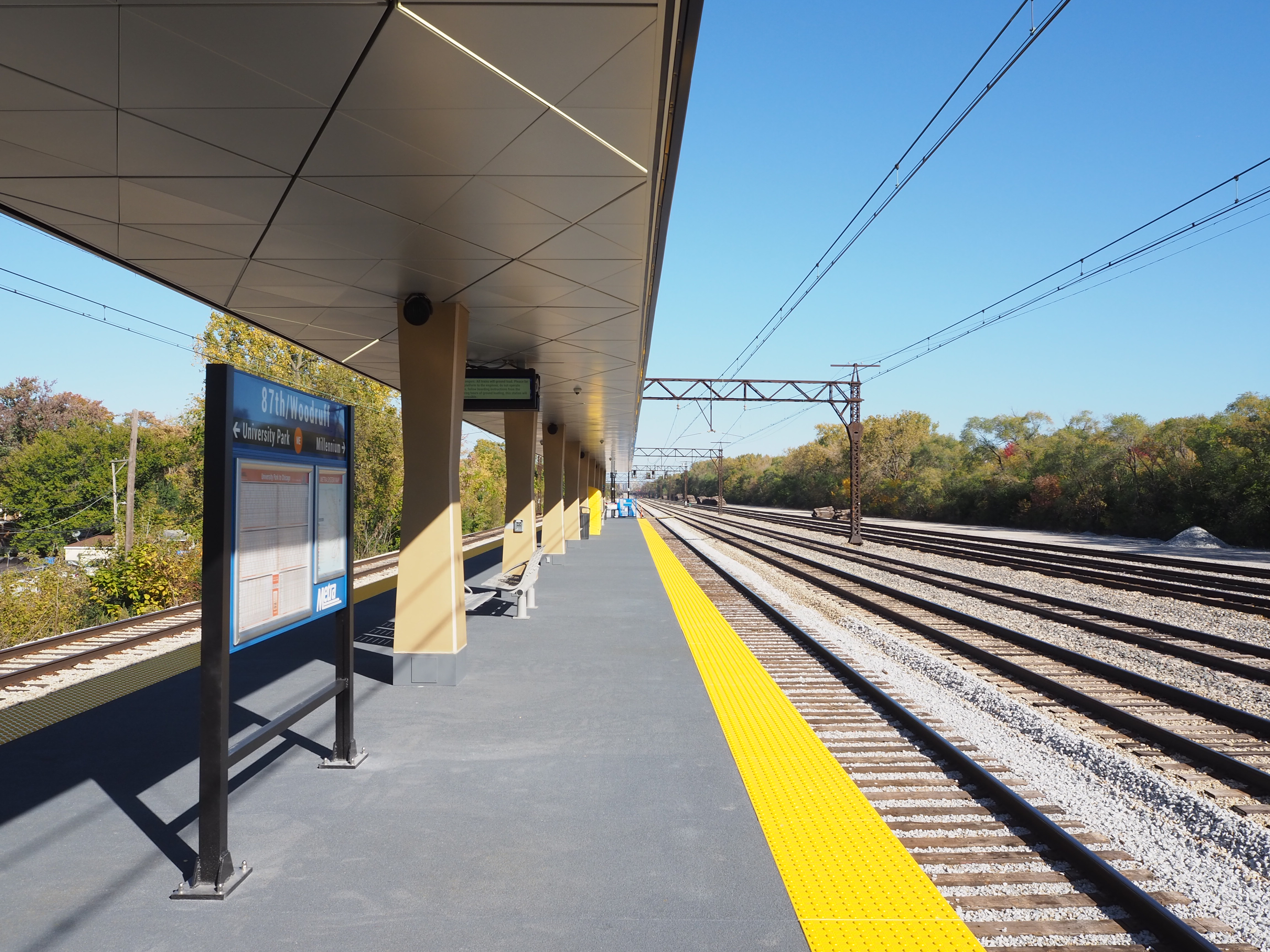
- 87th Street/Woodruff station in October 2025

General information
- Location: 87th Street and Dauphin Avenue; Chatham, Chicago, Illinois
- Coordinates: 41.7372°N 87.6003°W
- Owner: Metra
- Line: University Park Sub District
- Platforms: 1 island platform
- Tracks: 4

Construction
- Parking: Street-side
- Accessible: Yes

Other information
- Fare zone: 2

History
- Rebuilt: 2024–2025
- Electrified: 1926

Passengers
- 2018: 56 (average weekday) ▲36.6%
- Rank: 209 out of 236

Services
Preceding station	Metra	Following station
91st Street/Chesterfield toward University Park or Blue Island	Metra Electric Main Line & Blue Island Branch	83rd Street/Avalon Park toward Millennium
Former services
Preceding station	Illinois Central Railroad	Following station
91st Street toward Richton or Blue Island	Electric Suburban Main Line & Blue Island Branch	83rd Street toward Randolph Street
Track layout
Location

87th Street/Woodruff is an electrified commuter rail station along the Metra Electric Main Line in the Chatham neighborhood of Chicago, Illinois. The station is located at 87th Street and Dauphin Avenue (although unofficially includes South Ingleside Avenue) and is 10.9 miles (17.5 km) away from the northern terminus at Millennium Station. In Metra's zone-based fare system, 87th Street-Woodruff station is in zone 2. As of 2018, the station is the 209th busiest of Metra's 236 non-downtown stations, with an average of 56 weekday boardings. The station's rank is tied with the neighboring 83rd Street (Avalon Park) station.

Like much of the main branch of the Metra Electric line, 87th Street-Woodruff is built on elevated tracks near the embankment of a bridge over 87th Street. This bridge also carries the Amtrak line that runs parallel to it, carrying the City of New Orleans, Illini, and Saluki trains.

East of this station is another Metra Electric station on 87th Street on the South Chicago Branch at 87th Street and Baltimore Avenue. Approximately one mile west of the Woodruff station is the 87th Street station on the CTA Red Line at the Dan Ryan Expressway.

At the Woodruff station, street-side parking is available on the southwest and southeast corners of 87th Street and Dauphin Avenue at the north end of Dauphin Park. This can be found on the west side of the station just south of 87th Street. Though Metra's official website claims no bus connections are available, CTA's 87 bus does stop at Dauphin and Ingleside Avenues near the station, as well as on South Dobson Avenue on the east side of the station. The northbound 4 Cottage Grove bus stops on the southeast corner of 87th Street and Cottage Grove Avenue and the southbound 4 stops on the northwest corner of 87th Street and Cottage Grove. This intersection is about a quarter-mile west of the Woodruff station.

== History ==
As part of a reconstruction project, this station was temporarily closed beginning on December 16, 2024, which coincided with the reopening of the 79th Street (Chatham) station. The station rebuild concluded on October 6, 2025 and added an accessible entrance with an elevator, rebuilt platform, new lighting, and updated signage.

== Bus connections ==
CTA

- 87 87th
