= 91st Street/Chesterfield station =

Commuter rail station in Chicago, Illinois

91st Street/Chesterfield

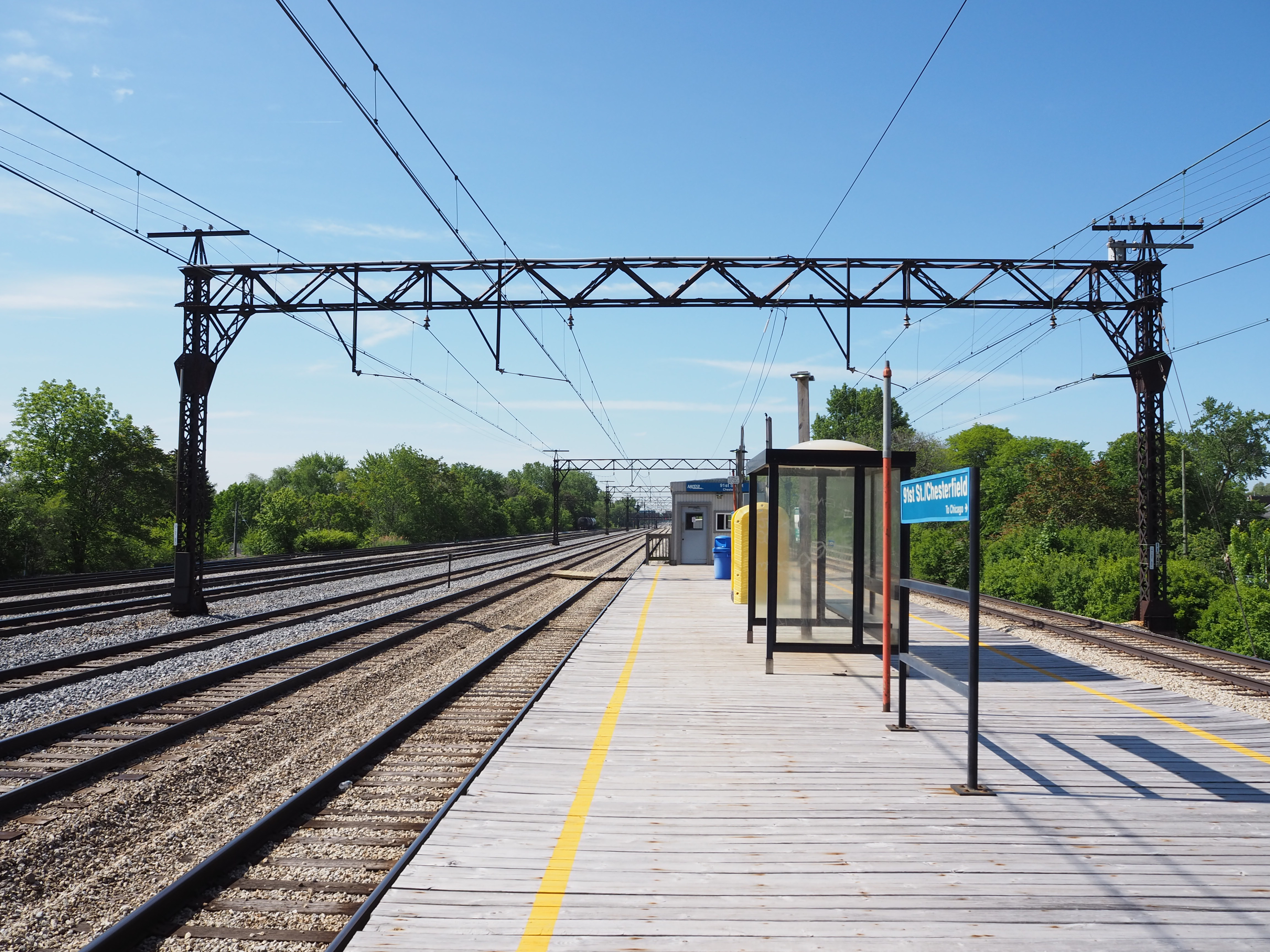
- 91st Street/Chesterfield station in May 2023.

General information
- Location: 91st Street and Dauphin Avenue; Burnside, Chicago, Illinois
- Coordinates: 41.7298°N 87.6020°W
- Owner: Metra
- Line: University Park Sub District
- Platforms: 1 island platform
- Tracks: 4

Construction
- Parking: Street-side
- Accessible: No

Other information
- Fare zone: 2

History
- Electrified: 1926

Passengers
- 2018: 23 (average weekday) ▼14.8%
- Rank: 226 out of 236

Services
Preceding station	Metra	Following station
95th Street/CSU toward University Park or Blue Island	Metra Electric Main Line & Blue Island Branch	87th Street/Woodruff toward Millennium
Former services
Preceding station	Illinois Central Railroad	Following station
95th Street toward Richton or Blue Island	Electric Suburban Main Line & Blue Island Branch	87th Street toward Randolph Street
Track layout
Location

91st Street/Chesterfield is an electrified commuter rail station along the Metra Electric Main Line in the Burnside neighborhood of Chicago, Illinois. It is located at 91st and Dauphin Streets and is 11.4 miles (18.3 km) away from the northern terminus at Millennium Station. In Metra's zone-based fare system, 91st Street (Chesterfield) is in zone 2. As of 2018, the station is the 226th busiest of Metra's 236 non-downtown stations, with an average of 23 weekday boardings.

Like much of the main branch of the Metra Electric line, 91st Street-Chesterfield is built on elevated tracks near the embankment of a bridge over 91st Street. This bridge also carries the Amtrak line that runs parallel to it, carrying the City of New Orleans, Illini, and Saluki trains. A freight spur also exists north of the station.

East of this station there was another Metra Electric station along 91st Street known as 91st Street (South Chicago) along the South Chicago Branch. This was replaced by South Chicago–93rd Street station in 2001. No bus connections are available. Street-side parking for 91st Street–Chesterfield station exists solely along both sides of 91st Street between the east side of the railroad bridge and the northwest and southwest corners of Drexel Avenue.
