= Garden Homes Historic District =

Garden Homes Historic District may refer to:

- Garden Homes Historic District (Chicago, Illinois), listed on the NRHP in Chicago, Illinois
- Garden Homes Historic District (Milwaukee, Wisconsin), listed on the NRHP in Milwaukee County, Wisconsin
