= 211th Street/Lincoln Highway station =

Commuter rail station in Olympia Fields, Illinois

211th/Lincoln Highway

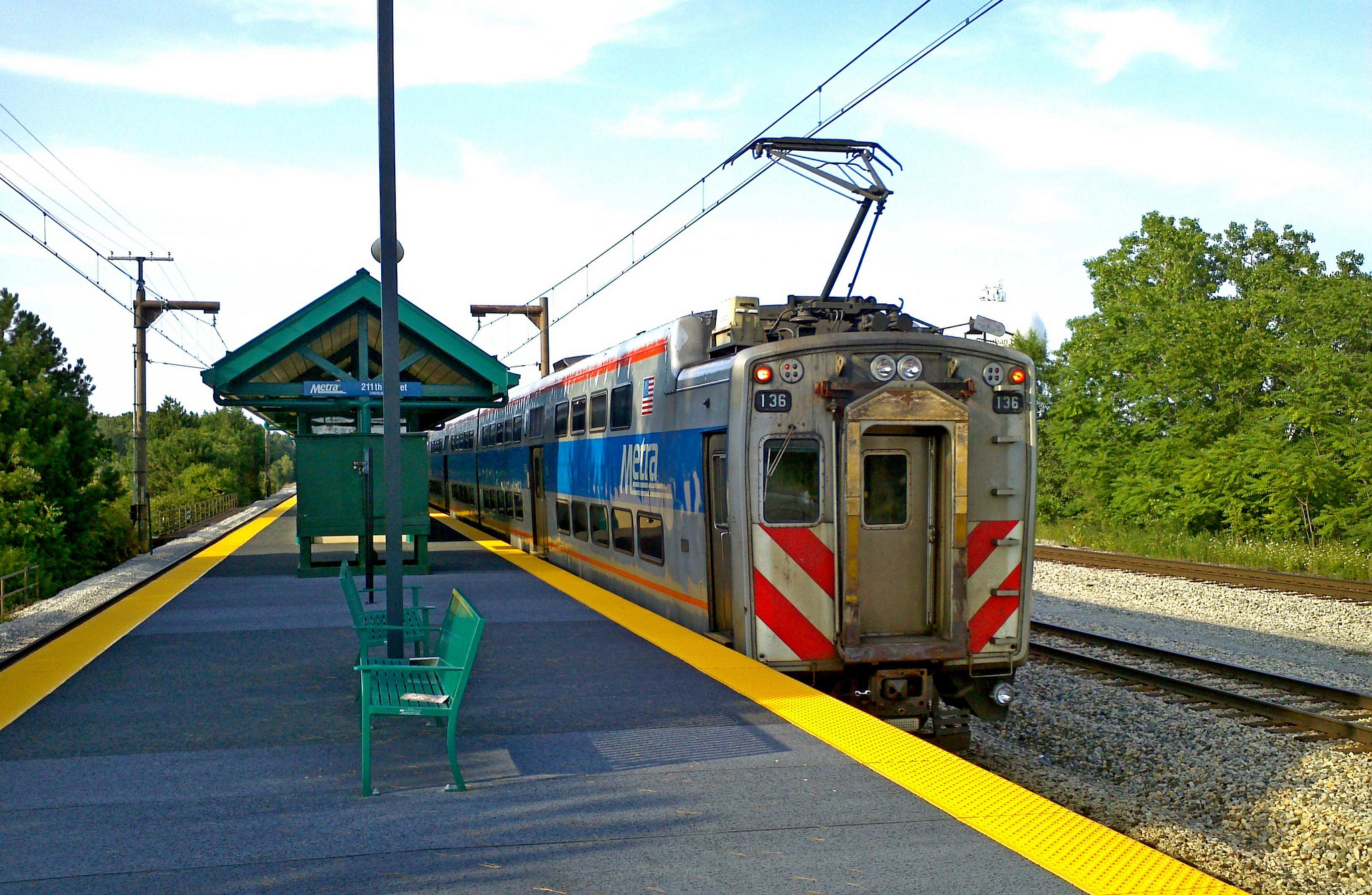
- A train at 211th Street/Lincoln Highway

General information
- Location: 211th Street between Olympian Way and Olympian Circle; Olympia Fields, Illinois
- Coordinates: 41.5062°N 87.6983°W
- Owner: Metra
- Line: University Park Sub District
- Platforms: 1 island platform
- Tracks: 2
- Connections: Pace Buses

Construction
- Parking: Yes
- Accessible: Yes

Other information
- Fare zone: 3

History
- Rebuilt: 2011
- Electrified: 1926

Passengers
- 2018: 527 (average weekday) ▼27.5%
- Rank: 95 out of 236

Services
Preceding station	Metra	Following station
Matteson toward University Park	Metra Electric Main Line	Olympia Fields toward Millennium
Former services
Preceding station	Illinois Central Railroad	Following station
Matteson toward Richton	Electric Suburban Main Line	Olympia Fields toward Randolph Street
Track layout
Location

211th Street/Lincoln Highway is a commuter rail station along the Main Branch of the Metra Electric line in Olympia Fields, Illinois. It is located at 211th Street east of Olympian Way and is 27.6 miles (44.4 km) from the northern terminus at Millennium Station. In Metra's zone-based fare system, 211th Street station is in zone 3. As of 2018, the station is the 95th busiest of Metra's 236 non-downtown stations, with an average of 527 weekday boardings. The station is located at the junction of three municipalities. The northern part of the platform and the parking lot west of the station lie in Olympia Fields, the eastern parking lot in Park Forest, and the western parking lot and bus station in Matteson.

The station is named with both of the names by which US 30 is known locally: Lincoln Highway and 211th Street. The station and tracks are built on an elevated roadbed and a bridge which spans US 30. This bridge also carries the Amtrak line that runs parallel to it, carrying the City of New Orleans, Illini, and Saluki trains. Parking is available on westbound US 30 between the railroad bridge and Olympian Way, and along eastbound US 30 on the southeast corner of the bridge, which is accessible from Homan Avenue via Indiana Street in Park Forest.

== Bus connections ==
Pace

- 357 Lincoln Highway
