= Community areas of Chicago =

Subdivisions of Chicago

A map of the 77 community areas, broken down by purported regions. While the areas have official use and definition, the color groupings are unofficial, and such "regions" may be defined differently, grouped differently, or not be used at all.

The city of Chicago is officially divided into 77 community areas.

Census data and other statistics are tied to the areas, which serve as the basis for a variety of urban planning initiatives on both the local and regional levels. The areas' boundaries do not generally change, allowing comparisons of statistics across time. The areas are distinct from but related to the more numerous neighborhoods of Chicago; an area often corresponds to a neighborhood or encompasses several neighborhoods, but the areas do not always correspond to popular conceptions of the neighborhoods due to a number of factors including historical evolution and choices made by the creators of the areas. As of 2020, Near North Side is the most populous of the areas with over 105,000 residents, while Burnside is the least populous with just over 2,500. Other geographical divisions of Chicago exist, such as the "sides" with origin in the 3 branches of the Chicago River, the 50 wards of the Chicago City Council which undergo redistricting based in population movements, and the parishes of the Roman Catholic Church.

The Social Science Research Committee at the University of Chicago defined the community areas in the 1920s based on neighborhoods or groups of related neighborhoods within the city. In this effort it was led by sociologists Robert E. Park and Ernest Burgess, who believed that physical contingencies created areas that would inevitably form a common identity. Except for the addition of two areas (O'Hare from land annexed by the city in 1956 and Edgewater's separation from Uptown in 1980) and peripheral expansions due to minor annexations, the areas' boundaries have never been revised to reflect change but instead have been kept stable. The areas have become a part of the culture of Chicago, contributing to its perception as a "city of neighborhoods" and breaking it down into smaller regions for easier analysis and local planning. Nevertheless, Park's and Burgess's ideas on the inevitability of physically related areas forming a common bond have been questioned, and the unchanging nature of the areas has at times been seen as analytically problematic with major subsequent changes in some of the areas' urban landscapes, such as the construction of expressways.

== History ==
During the 19th century wards were used by the Census Bureau for data at the level below cities. This was problematic as wards were political subdivisions and thus changed after each census, limiting their utility for comparisons over time. Census tracts were first used in Chicago in the 1910 Census. However, by the 1920s the Social Science Research Committee at the University of Chicago wanted divisions that were more natural and manageable than the arbitrarily-designated and numerous census tracts. The sociologist Robert E. Park led this charge, considering physical barriers such as railroads and the Chicago River to form distinctive and consistent areas within the city, which he deemed "natural" areas that would eventually merge into a distinctive identity. Ernest Burgess, a colleague of Park's who shared his thinking, was crucial in creating and naming the community areas. Initially able to identify 400 neighborhoods of the city, he considered that number excessive and trimmed it down to 80 and thereafter 75 by grouping related neighborhoods into a single community area. The Chicago Department of Public Health wished to present local differences in birth and death rates; it worked with the committee to produce the list of 75 community areas, which were divided into 935 census tracts.

After the community areas were introduced, the University of Chicago Press published data sorted by them from the 1920 and 1930 Censuses, as well as a citywide 1934 census to help collect data related to the Great Depression, in what was known as the Local Community Fact Book. With the exception of 1970 (whose data was published in 1980), it continued this publication for every subsequent census through 1990, expanding in the 1960s to also cover major suburbs of Chicago. The Chicago Metropolitan Agency for Planning continues this work by periodically publishing "Community Snapshots" of the community areas and suburbs, the most recent being data from 2018 published in June 2020.

Only two major changes have occurred in the boundaries of the community areas. O'Hare was created from land that was annexed by Chicago in 1956 to control O'Hare International Airport. (Note: Since community areas postdate the large annexations of the late 19th century, this is the only major annexation-related community area change.) Edgewater was separated from Uptown in 1980 as residents considered being joined to it a detriment to obtaining aid for local improvements. In addition to these two there have been minor changes due to further annexations and additions to the Lake Michigan shoreline.

== Use and reception ==
The areas are used for statistical and planning purposes by such professions as assessors, charities, and reporters. Shortly after their development they were used for all kinds of statistics, including movie theater distribution and juvenile delinquency. Although developed by the University of Chicago, they have been used by other universities in the Chicago area, as well as by the city and regional planners. They have contributed to Chicago's reputation as the "city of neighborhoods", and are argued to break up an intimidating city into more manageable pieces. Chicago was an early adopter of such a system, and as of 1997 most cities in the United States still lacked analogous divisions.

The areas do not necessarily correspond to popular imagination of the neighborhoods. For example, the Pilsen and Back of the Yards neighborhoods are much better known than their respective community areas Lower West Side and New City. In the case of New City this was a deliberate choice; Burgess opted for the less common "New City" to name the area as "Back of the Yards" carried a stigma after the publication of Upton Sinclair's The Jungle (1904), which made the area notorious for its poor living conditions. Some of these discrepancies are due to names that were common at the time of the adoption of community areas but have since been supplanted by others. The static nature of area boundaries is one of their benefits, but is also problematic at times such as when expressways were built in the mid-20th century and divided neighborhoods without area boundaries adapting. The concept of a "natural area" that underpinned Park's and Burgess's thinking has also been challenged.

== List of community areas ==
A map of the community areas by number; see the names of the areas associated with each number in this section.

Chicago community areas by number, population, and area
No.	Name	Population	Area		Density	
No.	Name	(2024)	(sq mi.)	(km^{2})	(/sq mi.)	(/km^{2})
01	Rogers Park	54,173	1.84	4.77	29,441.85	11,367.5
02	West Ridge	78,373	3.53	9.14	22,201.98	8,572.19
03	Uptown	56,344	2.32	6.01	24,286.21	9,376.9
04	Lincoln Square	41,651	2.56	6.63	16,269.92	6,281.82
05	North Center	36,014	2.05	5.31	17,567.8	6,782.93
06	Lake View	102,827	3.12	8.08	32,957.37	12,724.84
07	Lincoln Park	67,987	3.16	8.18	21,514.87	8,306.89
08	Near North Side	107,331	2.74	7.1	39,171.9	15,124.27
09	Edison Park	11,558	1.13	2.93	10,228.32	3,949.15
10	Norwood Park	39,840	4.37	11.32	9,116.7	3,519.96
11	Jefferson Park	26,649	2.33	6.03	11,437.34	4,415.96
12	Forest Glen	19,901	3.2	8.29	6,219.06	2,401.18
13	North Park	18,356	2.52	6.53	7,284.13	2,812.4
14	Albany Park	45,538	1.92	4.97	23,717.71	9,157.41
15	Portage Park	63,031	3.95	10.23	15,957.22	6,161.08
16	Irving Park	53,332	3.21	8.31	16,614.33	6,414.79
17	Dunning	41,233	3.72	9.63	11,084.14	4,279.59
18	Montclare	14,280	0.99	2.56	14,424.24	5,569.2
19	Belmont Cragin	72,088	3.91	10.13	18,436.83	7,118.46
20	Hermosa	22,576	1.17	3.03	19,295.73	7,450.08
21	Avondale	35,533	1.98	5.13	17,945.96	6,928.94
22	Logan Square	71,192	3.59	9.3	19,830.64	7,656.61
23	Humboldt Park	56,153	3.6	9.32	15,598.06	6,022.41
24	West Town	88,164	4.58	11.86	19,249.78	7,432.34
25	Austin	97,452	7.15	18.52	13,629.65	5,262.41
26	West Garfield Park	15,096	1.28	3.32	11,793.75	4,553.57
27	East Garfield Park	20,731	1.93	5	10,741.45	4,147.27
28	Near West Side	68,165	5.69	14.74	11,979.79	4,625.4
29	North Lawndale	33,958	3.21	8.31	10,578.82	4,084.48
30	South Lawndale	69,884	4.59	11.89	15,225.27	5,878.48
31	Lower West Side	33,446	2.93	7.59	11,415.02	4,407.34
32	Loop	42,550	1.65	4.27	25,787.88	9,956.7
33	Near South Side	30,482	1.78	4.61	17,124.72	6,611.85
34	Armour Square	13,885	1	2.59	13,885	5,361
35	Douglas	21,088	1.65	4.27	12,780.61	4,934.59
36	Oakland	6,937	0.58	1.5	11,960.34	4,617.89
37	Fuller Park	2,345	0.71	1.84	3,302.82	1,275.22
38	Grand Boulevard	25,181	1.74	4.51	14,471.84	5,587.58
39	Kenwood	18,417	1.04	2.69	17,708.65	6,837.31
40	Washington Park	12,313	1.52	3.94	8,100.66	3,127.66
41	Hyde Park	30,599	1.61	4.17	19,005.59	7,338.06
42	Woodlawn	23,801	2.07	5.36	11,498.07	4,439.4
43	South Shore	53,588	2.93	7.59	18,289.42	7,061.54
44	Chatham	29,942	2.95	7.64	10,149.83	3,918.85
45	Avalon Park	9,024	1.25	3.24	7,219.2	2,787.33
46	South Chicago	27,551	3.34	8.65	8,248.8	3,184.86
47	Burnside	2,304	0.61	1.58	3,777.05	1,458.32
48	Calumet Heights	11,229	1.75	4.53	6,416.57	2,477.44
49	Roseland	36,635	4.82	12.48	7,600.62	2,934.6
50	Pullman	6,744	2.12	5.49	3,181.13	1,228.24
51	South Deering	12,854	10.9	28.23	1,179.27	455.31
52	East Side	22,613	2.98	7.72	7,588.26	2,929.83
53	West Pullman	24,549	3.56	9.22	6,895.79	2,662.46
54	Riverdale	10,340	3.53	9.14	2,929.18	1,130.96
55	Hegewisch	8,927	5.24	13.57	1,703.63	657.77
56	Garfield Ridge	36,732	4.23	10.96	8,683.69	3,352.77
57	Archer Heights	13,414	2.01	5.21	6,673.63	2,576.69
58	Brighton Park	42,994	2.72	7.04	15,806.62	6,102.94
59	McKinley Park	14,854	1.41	3.65	10,534.75	4,067.47
60	Bridgeport	33,638	2.09	5.41	16,094.74	6,214.18
61	New City	40,065	4.83	12.51	8,295.03	3,202.71
62	West Elsdon	17,901	1.17	3.03	15,300	5,907.33
63	Gage Park	36,081	2.2	5.7	16,400.45	6,332.22
64	Clearing	23,629	2.55	6.6	9,266.27	3,577.71
65	West Lawn	31,942	2.95	7.64	10,827.8	4,180.61
66	Chicago Lawn	54,409	3.53	9.14	15,413.31	5,951.08
67	West Englewood	28,144	3.15	8.16	8,934.6	3,449.65
68	Englewood	23,195	3.07	7.95	7,555.37	2,917.13
69	Greater Grand Crossing	29,143	3.55	9.19	8,209.3	3,169.61
70	Ashburn	42,007	4.86	12.59	8,643.42	3,337.22
71	Auburn Gresham	43,779	3.77	9.76	11,612.47	4,483.57
72	Beverly	19,521	3.18	8.24	6,138.68	2,370.14
73	Washington Heights	24,851	2.86	7.41	8,689.16	3,354.89
74	Mount Greenwood	19,059	2.71	7.02	7,032.84	2,715.38
75	Morgan Park	20,873	3.3	8.55	6,325.15	2,442.14
76	O'Hare	14,394	13.34	34.55	1,079.01	416.61
77	Edgewater	56,563	1.74	4.51	32,507.47	12,551.13
Total	Chicago	2,711,226	227.34	588.81	11,925.86	4,604.58

== Community area demographics ==
Data as of 2024

Chicago community areas by racial makeup. All are non-Hispanic unless listed otherwise
No.	Name	Total Population	White	Hispanic/Latino	Black	Asian	Other/Multiple Races	% White	% Hispanic/Latino	% Black	% Asian	% Other/Multiple Races
1	Rogers Park	54,173	24,150	12,245	11,729	3,389	2,660	44.6	22.6	21.7	6.3	4.9
2	West Ridge	78,373	30,859	16,129	9,180	17,104	5101	39.4	20.6	11.7	21.8	6.5
3	Uptown	56,344	29,284	7,971	10,713	5,831	2,545	52.0	14.1	19.0	10.3	4.5
4	Lincoln Square	41,651	25,958	7,405	1,732	3,814	2,742	62.3	17.8	4.2	9.2	6.6
5	North Center	36,014	26,413	4,267	846	2,239	2,249	73.3	11.8	2.3	6.2	6.2
6	Lake View	102,827	74,953	10,539	4,603	7,480	5,252	72.9	10.2	4.5	7.3	5.1
7	Lincoln Park	67,987	52,142	5,387	1,680	5,513	3,265	76.7	7.9	2.5	8.1	4.8
8	Near North Side	107,331	69,049	8,884	8,520	15,939	4,939	64.3	8.3	7.9	14.9	4.6
9	Edison Park	11,558	9,181	1,724	70	187	396	79.4	14.9	0.6	1.6	3.4
10	Norwood Park	39,840	28,146	7,183	379	2,775	1,356	70.6	18.0	1.0	7.0	3.4
11	Jefferson Park	26,649	14,939	7,175	750	3,164	621	56.1	26.9	2.8	11.9	2.3
12	Forest Glen	19,901	13,949	2,145	281	2,602	924	70.1	10.8	1.4	13.1	4.6
13	North Park	18,356	8,220	3,024	1,022	5,404	686	44.8	16.5	5.6	29.4	3.7
14	Albany Park	45,538	15,585	19,570	1,598	6,869	1,916	34.2	43.0	3.5	15.1	4.2
15	Portage Park	63,031	29,354	25,779	1,474	3,716	2,708	46.6	40.9	2.3	5.9	4.3
16	Irving Park	53,332	24,496	19,938	1,980	4,637	2,281	45.9	37.4	3.7	8.7	4.3
17	Dunning	41,233	21,360	15,134	1,048	2,516	1,175	51.8	36.7	2.5	6.1	2.8
18	Montclare	14,280	4,195	8,675	1,041	330	39	29.4	60.7	7.3	2.3	0.3
19	Belmont Cragin	72,088	9,357	56,335	2,829	2,434	1,133	13.0	78.1	3.9	3.4	1.6
20	Hermosa	22,576	2,211	19,159	671	293	242	9.8	84.9	3.0	1.3	1.1
21	Avondale	35,533	13,468	17,652	1,123	1,498	1,792	37.9	49.7	3.2	4.2	5.0
22	Logan Square	71,192	37,340	23,480	4,120	3,365	2,887	52.4	33.0	5.8	4.7	4.1
22	Humboldt Park	56,153	6,777	30,190	16,932	1,256	998	12.1	53.8	30.2	2.2	1.8
24	West Town	88,164	54,160	17,452	5,355	5,812	5,385	61.4	19.8	6.1	6.6	6.1
25	Austin	97,452	5,452	21,212	67,261	830	2,697	5.6	21.8	69.0	0.9	2.8
26	West Garfield Park	15,096	176	1,257	13,447	107	109	1.2	8.3	89.1	0.7	0.7
27	East Garfield Park	20,731	1,581	2,197	16,382	151	420	7.6	10.6	79.0	0.7	2.0
28	Near West Side	68,165	28,578	7,888	16,540	11,691	3,468	41.9	11.6	24.3	17.2	5.1
29	North Lawndale	33,958	1,435	5,105	26,663	128	627	4.2	15.0	78.5	0.4	1.8
30	South Lawndale	69,884	4,295	54,416	8,292	666	215	6.1	80.7	11.9	1.0	0.3
31	Lower West Side	33,446	7,225	22,821	791	1,504	1,105	21.6	68.2	2.4	4.5	3.3
32	Loop	42,550	21,242	4,488	4,661	10,327	1,832	49.9	10.5	11.0	24.3	4.3
33	Near South Side	30,482	13,084	2,411	7,941	5,576	1,470	42.9	7.9	26.1	18.3	4.8
34	Armour Square	13,885	1,831	650	1,630	9,220	554	13.2	4.7	11.7	66.4	4.0
35	Douglas	21,088	2,212	1,651	13,520	2,721	984	10.5	7.8	64.1	12.9	4.7
36	Oakland	6,937	365	421	5,801	0	350	5.3	6.1	83.6	0.0	5.0
37	Fuller Park	2,345	58	196	1,812	40	238	2.5	8.4	77.3	1.7	10.2
38	Grand Boulevard	25,181	1,426	1,158	21,151	131	1,315	5.7	4.6	84.0	0.5	5.2
39	Kenwood	18,417	3,752	641	11,596	1,042	1,386	20.4	3.5	63.0	5.7	7.5
40	Washington Park	12,313	241	357	11,318	11	386	2.0	2.9	91.9	0.1	3.1
41	Hyde Park	30,599	12,453	2,469	7,941	5,160	2,576	40.7	8.1	26.0	16.9	8.4
42	Woodlawn	23,801	2,506	992	18,065	998	1,240	10.5	4.2	75.9	4.2	5.2
43	South Shore	53,588	1,911	1,655	48,243	213	1,566	3.6	3.1	90.0	0.4	2.9
44	Chatham	39,942	375	1,279	27,570	127	591	1.3	4.3	92.1	0.4	2.0
45	Avalon Park	9,024	1	501	7,977	7	538	0.0	5.6	98.4	0.1	6.0
46	South Chicago	27,551	1,281	6,496	18,991	88	695	4.6	23.6	68.9	0.3	2.5
46	Burnside	2,304	0	111	2,116	0	77	0.0	4.8	91.8	0.0	3.3
48	Calumet Heights	11,229	30	628	10,365	32	174	0.3	5.6	92.3	0.3	1.5
49	Roseland	36,635	720	1,154	33,635	173	953	2.0	3.1	91.8	0.5	2.6
50	Pullman	6,744	839	521	5,199	97	88	12.4	7.7	77.1	1.4	1.3
51	South Deering	12,854	760	3,959	7,990	15	130	5.9	30.8	62.2	0.1	1.0
52	East Side	22,613	3,037	18,856	535	21	164	13.4	83.4	2.4	0.1	0.7
53	West Pullman	24,549	206	2,109	21,739	60	435	0.8	8.6	88.6	0.2	1.8
54	Riverdale	10,340	63	732	9,296	15	234	0.7	7.1	89.9	0.1	2.3
55	Hegewisch	8,927	3,185	4,713	860	113	56	35.7	52.8	9.6	1.3	0.6
56	Garfield Ridge	36,732	12,054	21,701	1,357	699	921	32.8	59.1	3.7	1.9	2.5
57	Archer Heights	13,414	1,727	10,659	211	787	30	12.9	79.5	1.6	5.9	0.2
58	Brighton Park	42,994	2,772	33,872	933	5,090	327	6.4	78.8	2.2	11.8	0.8
59	McKinley Park	14,854	2,008	8,461	482	3,534	369	13.5	57.0	3.2	23.8	2.6
60	Bridgeport	33,638	10,797	8,152	950	12,694	1,045	32.1	24.2	2.8	37.7	3.1
61	New City	40,065	3,578	27,030	7,919	1,284	255	8.9	67.5	19.8	3.2	0.6
62	West Elsdon	17,901	2,370	14,882	238	410	1	13.2	83.1	1.3	2.3	0.0
63	Gage Park	36,081	1,292	32,047	2,253	267	222	3.6	88.8	6.2	0.7	0.6
64	Clearing	23,629	7,142	15,740	221	190	336	30.2	66.6	0.9	0.8	1.4
65	West Lawn	31,942	2,732	28,100	637	365	108	8.6	88.0	2.0	1.1	0.3
66	Chicago Lawn	54,409	1,720	33,204	18,050	229	1,206	3.2	61.0	33.2	0.4	2.2
67	West Englewood	28,144	149	7,734	19,146	137	978	0.5	27.5	68.0	0.5	3.5
68	Englewood	23,195	243	2,204	19,897	140	711	1.0	9.5	85.8	0.6	3.1
69	Greater Grand Crossing	29,143	427	2,109	25,673	212	722	1.5	7.2	88.1	0.7	2.5
70	Ashburn	42,007	3,435	19,542	17,909	419	702	8.2	46.5	42.6	1.0	1.7
71	Auburn Gresham	43,779	231	1,989	40,597	231	731	0.5	4.5	92.7	0.5	1.7
72	Beverly	19,521	11,197	1,293	6,055	145	831	57.4	6.6	31.0	0.7	4.3
73	Washington Heights	24,851	350	915	23,100	70	416	1.4	3.7	93.0	0.3	1.7
74	Mount Greenwood	19,059	15,698	1,782	668	134	777	82.4	9.3	3.5	0.7	4.1
75	Morgan Park	20,873	5,982	1,187	12,760	265	678	28.7	5.7	61.1	1.3	3.3
76	O'Hare	14,394	8,915	1,648	881	2,066	885	61.9	11.4	6.1	14.4	6.1
77	Edgewater	56,563	29,273	9,267	6,965	7,660	3,398	51.8	16.4	12.3	13.5	6.0
	Chicago	2,711,226	870,127	805,318	743,710	196,435	95,636	32.1	29.7	27.4	7.2	3.5

== Other geographic divisions ==
On the flag of Chicago, three of the stripes reflect the traditional "sides" of the city.

Chicago is traditionally divided into the three "sides" of the North Side, West Side, and South Side by the Chicago River. These three sides are represented by the white stripes on the Flag of Chicago. The city is also divided into 50 wards for the purpose of electing one alderman each to the Chicago City Council. These wards have at times generated identities similar to neighborhoods. Unlike community areas, wards are adjusted decennially to account for population shifts. Another method of neighborhood nomenclature in heavily Catholic neighborhoods of Chicago has been to refer to communities in terms of parishes. For example, one might say, "I live in St. Gertrude's, but he is from Saint Ita's."
