= Flossmoor station =

Commuter rail station in Flossmoor, Illinois

Flossmoor

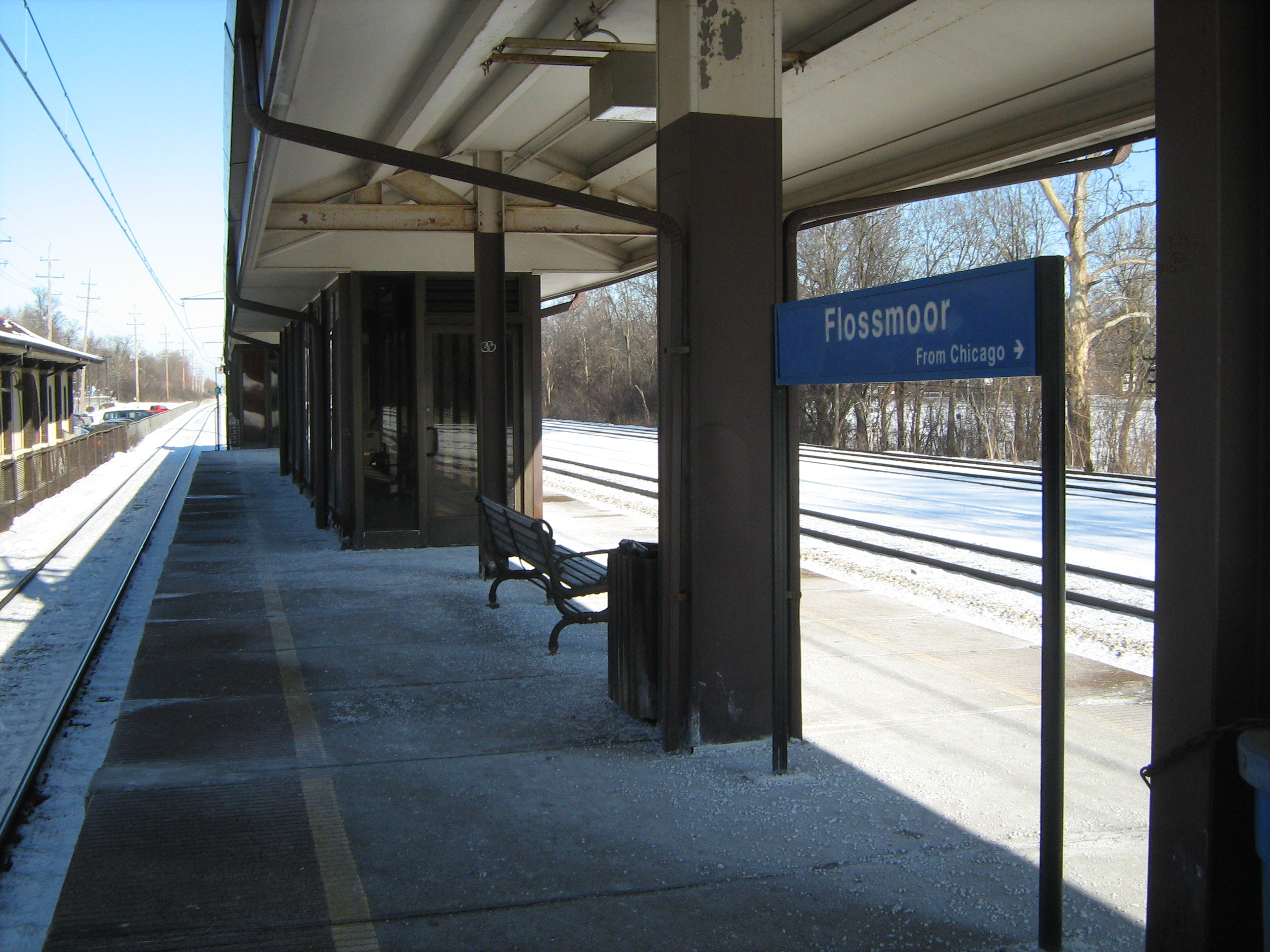
- Flossmoor station in January 2010.

General information
- Location: Flossmoor and Sterling Roads; Flossmoor, Illinois
- Coordinates: 41.543435°N 87.678349°W
- Owner: Metra
- Line: University Park Sub District
- Platforms: 1 island platform
- Tracks: 2
- Connections: Pace bus service

Construction
- Structure type: Elevated
- Parking: Yes
- Accessible: Yes

Other information
- Fare zone: 3

History
- Opened: 1856
- Rebuilt: 1906
- Electrified: 1926

Passengers
- 2018: 859 (average weekday) ▲4.2%
- Rank: 60 out of 236

Services
Preceding station	Metra	Following station
Olympia Fields toward University Park	Metra Electric Main Line	Homewood toward Millennium
Former services
Preceding station	Illinois Central Railroad	Following station
Olympia Fields toward Richton	Electric Suburban Main Line	Homewood toward Randolph Street
Track layout
Location

Flossmoor is a station on Metra's Metra Electric District located in Flossmoor, Illinois. The station is located at Flossmoor Road and Sterling Road. Flossmoor is 24.93 miles (40.12 km) from Millennium Station, the northern terminus of the Metra Electric District. In Metra's zone-based fare system, Flossmoor is located in zone 3. As of 2018, Flossmoor is the 60th busiest of Metra's 236 non-downtown stations, with an average of 859 weekday boardings. The station is on a solid-fill elevated structure and consists of a 1906-built Illinois Central Railroad building next to one island platform which serves the Metra Electric District's two tracks. There is no ticket agent at Flossmoor, but tickets may be purchased from a vending machine in the waiting room or online using the Ventra app. The old station house is used as a local restaurant and beer brewery.
