= Olympia Fields station =

Commuter rail station in Olympia Fields, Illinois

Olympia Fields

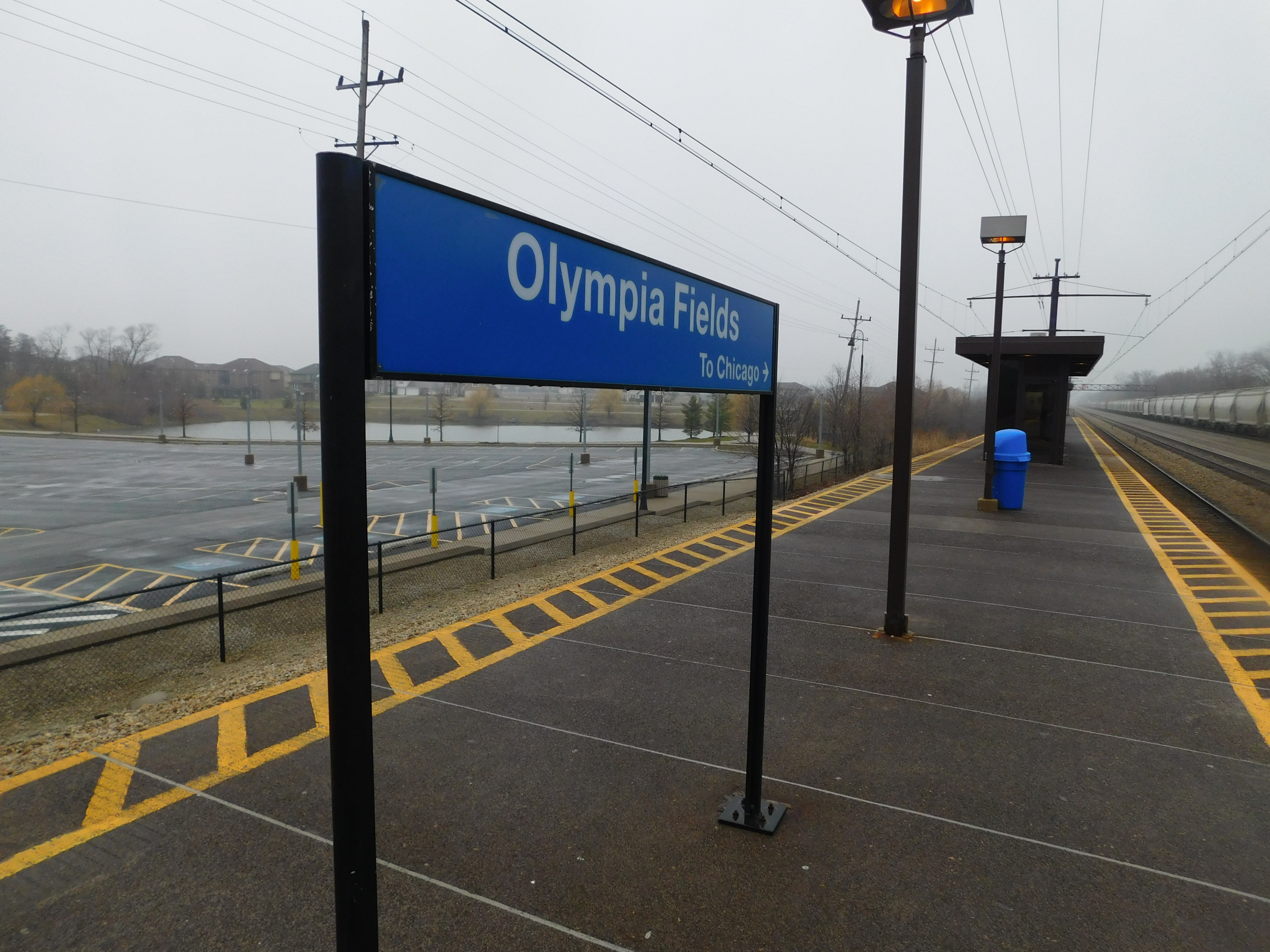
- Olympia Fields station in March 2017.

General information
- Location: 203rd Street, 2 blocks east of Kedzie Avenue; Olympia Fields, Illinois
- Coordinates: 41.520592°N 87.690439°W
- Owner: Metra
- Line: University Park Sub District
- Platforms: 1 island platform
- Tracks: 2 tracks

Construction
- Structure type: Elevated
- Parking: Yes
- Accessible: No

Other information
- Fare zone: 3

History
- Opened: 1856
- Electrified: 1926

Passengers
- 2018: 679 (average weekday) ▲5.6%
- Rank: 77 out of 236

Services
Preceding station	Metra	Following station
211th Street toward University Park	Metra Electric Main Line	Flossmoor toward Millennium
Former services
Preceding station	Illinois Central Railroad	Following station
211th Street toward Richton	Electric Suburban Main Line	Flossmoor toward Randolph Street
Track layout
Location

Olympia Fields is a station on Metra's Metra Electric District located in Olympia Fields, Illinois. The station is located on 203rd Street two blocks east of Kedzie Avenue and is adjacent to the Olympia Fields Country Club to the east and the Olympia Fields U.S. post office and commuter parking to the west. The station is 26.6 miles (42.8 km) from Millennium Station, the northern terminus of the Metra Electric District. In Metra's zone-based fare system, Olympia Fields is located in zone 3. As of 2018, Olympia Fields is the 77th busiest of Metra's 236 non-downtown stations, with an average of 679 weekday boardings.

The station is on a solid-fill elevated structure and consists of one island platform which serves the Metra Electric District's tracks. The adjacent two track right-of-way is owned by the Canadian National Railway and also carries three Amtrak lines, the City of New Orleans, Illini and Saluki. None of the Amtrak trains stop here. Although the tracks are on an elevated fill, it is only high enough for a pedestrian underpass to the Olympia Fields Country Club. 203rd Street is a dead end street at the station. There is no ticket agent at Olympia Fields, but tickets may be purchased from a vending machine in the waiting room.

The station is scheduled to be completely reconstructed in the near future, modernizing it and making it ADA accessible.
