= 83rd Street/Avalon Park station =

Commuter rail station in Chicago, Illinois

83rd Street/Avalon Park

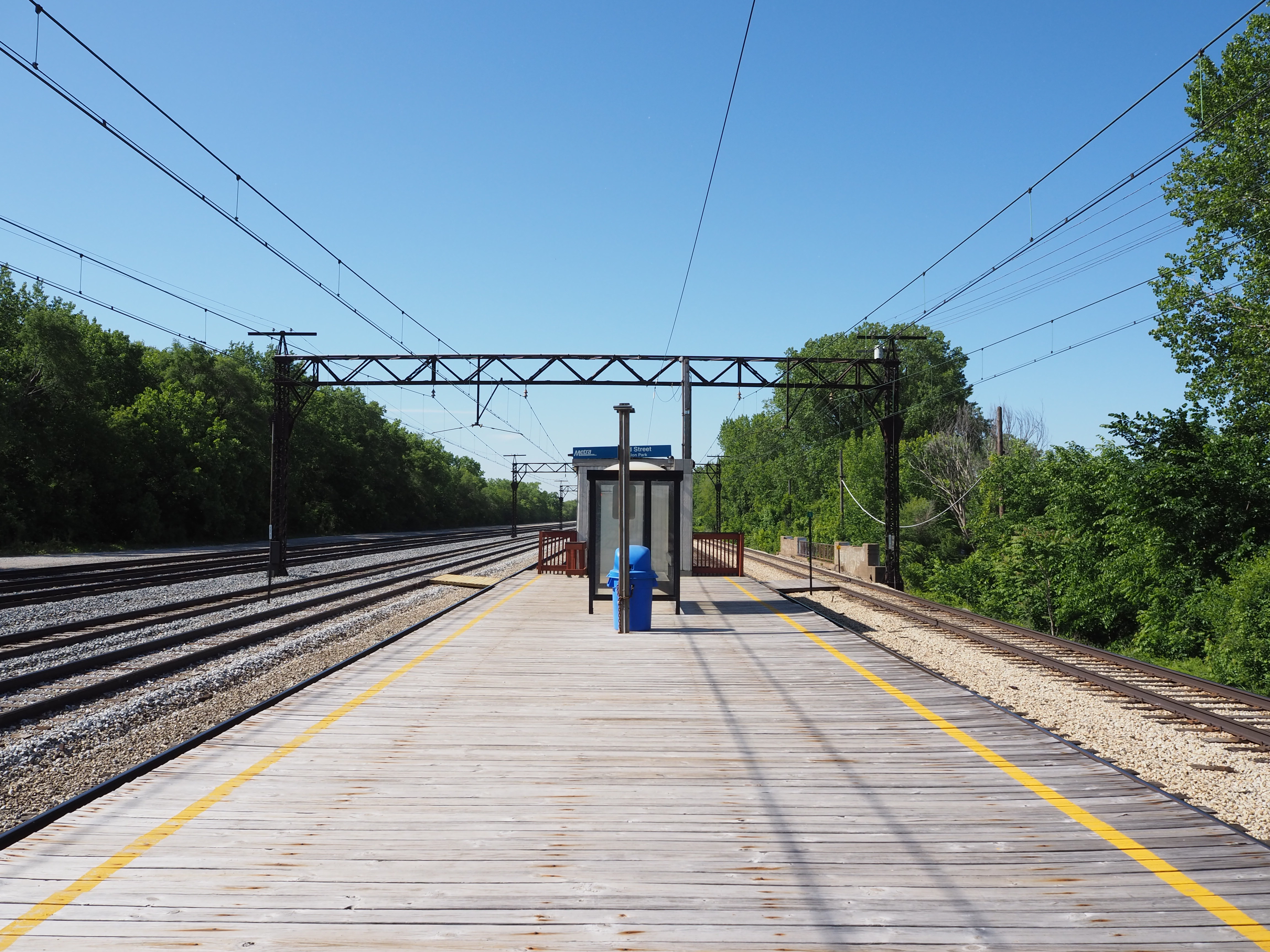
- 83rd Street (Avalon Park) station in May 2023.

General information
- Location: 83rd Street near Ellis Avenue; Chatham, Chicago, Illinois
- Coordinates: 41.7446°N 87.5986°W
- Owner: Metra
- Line: University Park Sub District
- Platforms: 1 island platform
- Tracks: 4

Construction
- Parking: Street-side
- Accessible: No

Other information
- Fare zone: 2

History
- Opened: 1926
- Electrified: 1926

Passengers
- 2018: 56 (average weekday) ▲40%
- Rank: 209 out of 236

Services
Preceding station	Metra	Following station
87th Street/Woodruff toward University Park or Blue Island	Metra Electric Main Line & Blue Island Branch	79th Street/Chatham toward Millennium
Former services
Preceding station	Illinois Central Railroad	Following station
87th Street toward Richton or Blue Island	Electric Suburban Main Line & Blue Island Branch	79th Street toward Randolph Street
Track layout
Location

83rd Street/Avalon Park is an electrified commuter rail station along the Metra Electric Main Line in Chicago, Illinois. The station is located over 83rd Street near Ellis Avenue and is 10.4 miles (16.7 km) away from the northern terminus at Millennium Station. Despite the name of the station, it is actually located in Chatham, not the Avalon Park neighborhood for which it is named; however, it is only a short distance from Avalon Park. In Metra's zone-based fare system, 83rd Street-Avalon Park station is in zone 2. As of 2018, the station is the 209th busiest of Metra's 236 non-downtown stations, with an average of 56 weekday boardings. The station's rank is tied with the neighboring 87th Street (Woodruff) station.

Like much of the main branch of the Metra Electric line, 83rd Street-Avalon Park is built on elevated tracks near the embankment of a bridge over 83rd Street. This bridge also carries an Amtrak line (owned by Canadian National Railway) that runs parallel to it, carrying the City of New Orleans, Illini, and Saluki trains. The former Nickel Plate Railroad ran just east of the Metra tracks. It also had a station stop at 83rd Street. The Nickel Plate right-of-way now is overgrown with trees.

There is another 83rd Street station on the South Chicago Branch.

Side-street parking is available on 83rd Street between the tracks and Woodlawn Avenue. Currently, no bus connections are available.
