= Illinois Department of Transportation =

Government agency in Springfield, Illinois, U.S.

Agency overview
- Formed: February 29, 1972; 54 years ago
- Preceding agency: Illinois Department of Public Works and Buildings
- Jurisdiction: Illinois
- Headquarters: Hanley Building, 2300 S. Dirksen Parkway, Springfield, Illinois, U.S.
- Annual budget: $27.8 billion (FY 2025)
- Agency executive: Gia Biagi, Secretary
- Parent agency: State of Illinois
- Website: www.dot.il.gov

The Illinois Department of Transportation (IDOT) is a state agency in charge of state-maintained public roadways of the U.S. state of Illinois. In addition, IDOT provides funding for rail, public transit and airport projects and administers fuel tax and federal funding to local jurisdictions in the state. The Secretary of Transportation reports to the Governor of Illinois. IDOT is headquartered in Springfield. In addition, the IDOT Division of Highways has offices in nine locations throughout the state.

== Organization ==
As of February 2009, the Illinois Department of Transportation was divided into the following offices and divisions:

Offices

- The Office of Business and Workforce Diversity oversees the implementation of directives, policies, and strategies for departmental business diversity efforts.
- The Office of Chief Counsel provides legal counsel to the department on policy issues and proposed actions affecting any of its operating divisions or staff offices. The Office is responsible for the prosecution and defense of all litigation involving the department in cooperation with the Illinois Attorney General. The Office of Chief Counsel administers tort liability claims, property damage claims and uncollectable receivables, as well as processes lien and bond claims against contractors. The Office coordinates the purchase and service of all insurance policies and administers the department's self-insurance program.
- The Office of Finance and Administration develops and administers the department's budget; manages the department's personnel system; provides accounting and auditing functions; provides centralized business services functions and facilities management; and provides management information capabilities.
- The Office of Communications was created in 2009 by combining the Office of Governmental Affairs and the Office of External Affairs. The Office of Communications develops and implements the department's public affairs policies, plans, and programs. This includes developing the department's policy goals and positions; prepares and implements state legislative programs and strategies; analyzes issues of special interest to the Secretary; and represents the Secretary before various state and national organizations. Its primary objectives are to ensure adequate information toward increasing public involvement in the transportation planning process; assist the news media in the coverage of agency activities; increase the department's sensitivity to its public and interpret public opinion so that agency programs and regulations will be realistic and acceptable; and to mobilize support for the department and its programs.
- The Office of Planning and Programming develops programs to improve the state transportation system. This includes working with metropolitan planning organizations in ten of the state's urbanized areas to develop programs relating to urban transportation; coordinating a surveillance program to monitor the physical condition of the transportation system, the level of service provided and the need for improvement; evaluating proposals for major investments in the transportation system and overall benefits to be gained. The Office ensures the continuation of state rail services where the potential for efficiency and economy are most favorable and minimizing the expenditure of public funds for rail subsidies. The Office works closely with the Chicago Metropolitan Agency for Planning (CMAP), which serves as a forum for transportation decision-making by local elected officials in northeastern Illinois. The Office develops and implements Federal legislative initiatives as well as the initiation and coordination of policy statement and papers which serve as guides for departmental actions on a broad spectrum of transportation issues.
- The Office of Quality Compliance and Review independently tests the department's internal control systems to further ensure to the Secretary and to the public the adequacy of the policies, regulations, and procedures and to recommend improvements.
- The Office of Intermodal Project Implementation promotes and assures safe and efficient mass transportation systems and services in the State of Illinois by developing and recommending policies and programs; developing, implementing and administering operating, capital and technical program projects and grants; and coordinating and participating in local and statewide planning and programming activities. It also coordinates and implements aeronautics programs concerning air safety, airport construction and other aeronautical related issues in Illinois.

Divisions

- The Division of Highways develops, maintains and operates the state highway system. The central bureaus of the Division developing policies, procedures, standards, and guidelines to accomplish the department's highway system improvement objectives. The central bureaus monitor the nine district programs to ensure statewide uniformity of policy interpretation and compliance and to ensure program coordination with federal, state and local agencies.

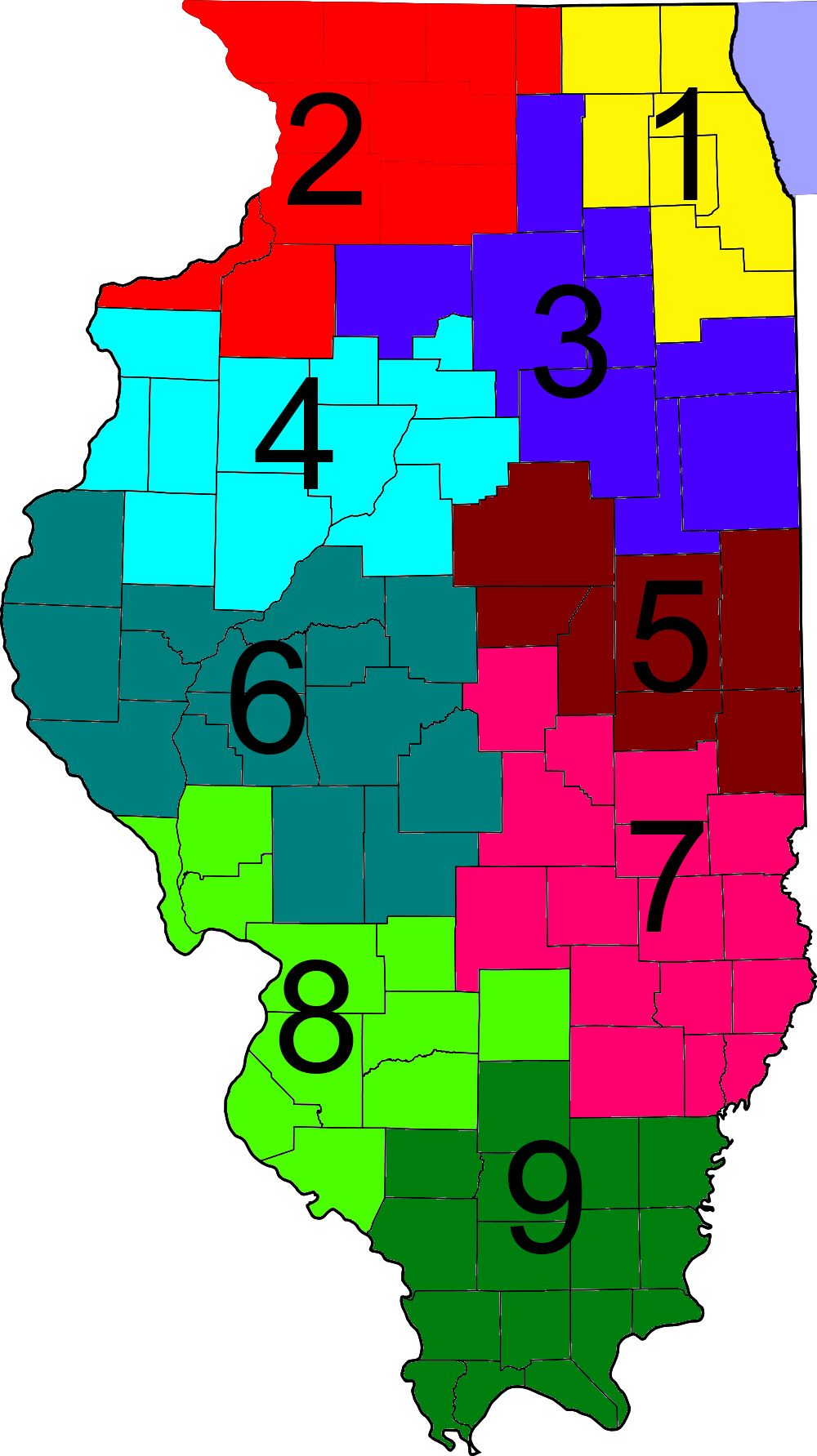
IDOT districts map

- District Offices
  - District 1 – Schaumburg (covers Chicago Metropolitan Area)
  - District 2 – Dixon
  - District 3 – Ottawa
  - District 4 – Peoria
  - District 5 – Paris
  - District 6 – Springfield
  - District 7 – Effingham
  - District 8 – Collinsville (covers St. Louis Metropolitan Area)
  - District 9 – Carbondale
- The Division of Traffic Safety providing Illinois motorists, cyclists, and pedestrians with a safe environment by promoting the reduction of traffic fatalities, injuries, and accidents. The Division develops and promulgates regulations in areas of accident reporting, hazardous materials' transportation, vehicle inspection, safety responsibility, cycle rider training and highway safety Federal Section 402, 408 and 410 Grants.

== History ==
The Illinois Department of Transportation was created by the 77th Illinois General Assembly in January 1972. The department absorbed the functions of the former Department of Public Works and Buildings, acquired some planning and safety inspection functions of other state agencies, and received responsibility for state assistance to local mass transportation agencies such as the Chicago-area Regional Transportation Authority, which was in the process of being formed at this time. The Division of Aeronautics was added in 1973.

On June 18, 2005, IDOT became the first state transportation agency to achieve ISO 9001:2000 certification for 23 key processes located in the Central Administrative Office and regional District Six. On July 6, 2006, that certification was expanded to encompass all processes involved in the planning, design, and construction of road and bridge improvements, maintenance of roads and bridges, and administrative oversight in the Central Administrative Office and District Six.

In the spring of 2014, it was reported that IDOT had engaged in patronage hiring of numerous staff assistants – Ann Schneider resigning following this scandal. Schneider claimed that the improper hires were "recommended to me or my staff by the governor's office," specifically Chief of Staff Jack Lavin.
