= Burnside, Chicago =

Community area in Chicago, Illinois

Burnside
- Community area
- Community Area 47 - Burnside
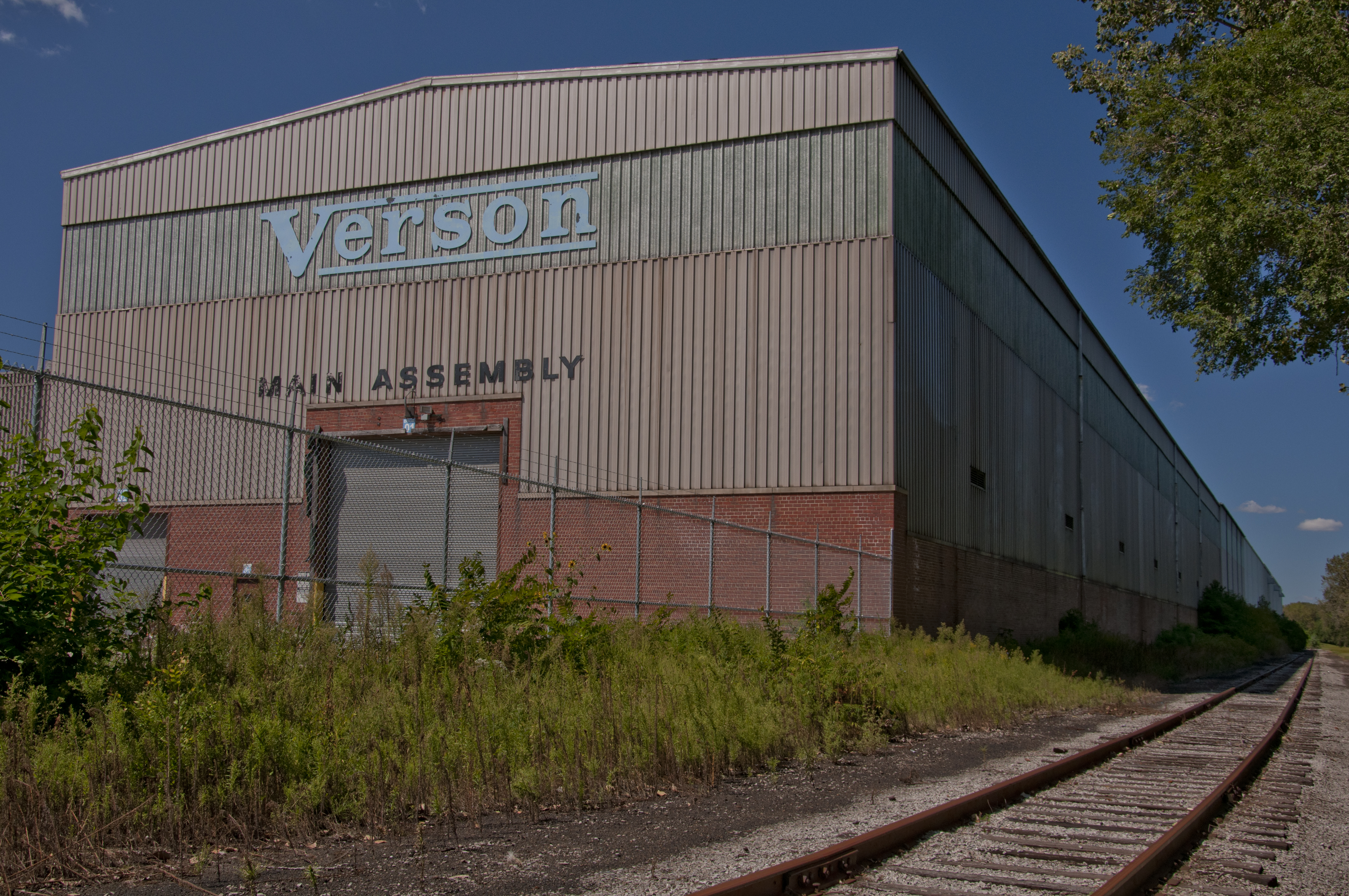
- Verson Steel main assembly plant

- Location within the city of Chicago
- Coordinates: 41°43.8′N 87°36′W
- Country: United States
- State: Illinois
- County: Cook
- City: Chicago
- Neighborhoods: Burnside

Area
  - Total: 0.62 sq mi (1.61 km^{2})

Population (2024)
  - Total: 2,304
  - Density: 3,710/sq mi (1,430/km^{2})

Demographics 2024
  - White: 0.0%
  - Black: 91.8%
  - Hispanic: 4.8%
  - Asian: 0.0%
  - Other: 3.3%

Educational Attainment 2024
  - High School Diploma or Higher: 86.7%
  - Bachelor's Degree or Higher: 23.5%
- Time zone: UTC-6 (CST)
  - Summer (DST): UTC-5 (CDT)
- ZIP codes: parts of 60619
- Median household income: $23,632
- Source: U.S. Census, Record Information Services

Burnside is one of the 77 community areas of Chicago in Illinois, United States. The 47th numbered area, it is located on the city's far south side. This area is also called "The Triangle" by locals, as it is bordered by railroad tracks on every side; the Canadian National Railway on the west, the Union Pacific Railroad on the south and the Norfolk Southern Railway on the east. With a population of 2,254 in 2016, it is the least populous of the community areas, as well as the second smallest by area after Oakland.

== History ==
=== Etymology ===
The Burnside station subsequently the community area is named for Ambrose Burnside, a general for the Union in the American Civil War and an official in the Illinois Central Railroad (ICRR), now Canadian National Railway (CN).

=== 19th century ===
The area was mostly undeveloped swamp land north of Lake Calumet until after the American Civil War. The ICRR built the Burnside Station at 95th street.

By the 1890s, the ICRR began construction of a roundhouse and repair shop at 95th and South Park Boulevard on what is now the site of Chicago State University. Developer W. V. Jacobs purchased the land in the triangle and began building residential homes. The area was settled by predominantly Hungarian, Polish, Italian and Ukrainian immigrants. Factory jobs were plentiful at the nearby Burnside Shops as well as Pullman Company, Burnside Steel Mill and other nearby factories.

=== 20th century ===
Originally considered part of Roseland and the Chatham communities, it was distinguished as one of the 77 Chicago community areas when the University of Chicago established its sociological map of Chicago communities.

Following World War II, the area's population makeup included a growing number of African-Americans. This was one of several transformations that this working-class neighborhood would undergo. Burnside's fortunes began to change in the 1960s when industry patterns lead to economic decline. Nearby steel mills were shuttered. The Pullman Company scaled back production and eventually closed for good in 1981. Skyrocketing crime rates, gang violence and urban decay forced longtime residents and businesses to move away, a phenomenon referred to as white flight.

== Geography ==
Burnside is community area #47. It is located 11 miles (18 km) south of the Loop. It is geographically the smallest of the community areas. It is bounded by the ICRR to the west, the New York Central Railroad to the east, and the Rock Island Railroad to the south.

== Demographics ==
Historical population
Census	Pop.	Note	%±
1930	3,483		—
1940	3,567		2.4%
1950	3,551		−0.4%
1960	3,463		−2.5%
1970	3,181		−8.1%
1980	3,942		23.9%
1990	3,445		−12.6%
2000	3,294		−4.4%
2010	2,915		−11.5%
2020	2,527		−13.3%

According to an analysis of United States Census data by the Chicago Metropolitan Agency for Planning, there were 2,254 people and 956 households in Burnside. The racial makeup of the area was 0.4% White, 97.5% African American, and 0.6% other races. Hispanic or Latino residents of any race were 1.5% of the population. In the area, the population was spread out, with 16.9% under the age of 19, 21.8% from 20 to 34, 15.5% from 35 to 49, 19.4% from 50 to 64, and 26.3% who were 65 years of age or older. The median age was 46 years. 45.7% of residents lived alone, 28.8% of residents lived with one other person, 8.1% of residents lived in three-person households, and 17.4% of residents lived in a household of four or more people.

== Politics ==
Burnside is a stronghold for the Democratic Party. Its small size and closed boundaries have historically rendered it unattractive to most politicians and resulted in it receiving few rewards.

=== Local ===
In the Chicago City Council Burnside is part of the 8th ward where it is represented by Democratic alderman Michelle A. Harris. Throughout the 20th century it historically alternated between the 9th and 10th wards.

=== State ===
In the Illinois House of Representatives Burnside is part of the District 33, where it is represented by Democrat Marcus C. Evans Jr. In the Illinois Senate it is part of District 17, where it is represented by Democrat Elgie Sims.

=== Federal ===
In the 2016 presidential election, Burnside cast 1,206 votes for Hillary Clinton and cast 19 votes Donald Trump. In the 2012 presidential election, Burnside cast 1,427 votes for Barack Obama and 8 votes for Mitt Romney.
