= Matteson station =

Commuter rail station in Matteson, Illinois

Matteson

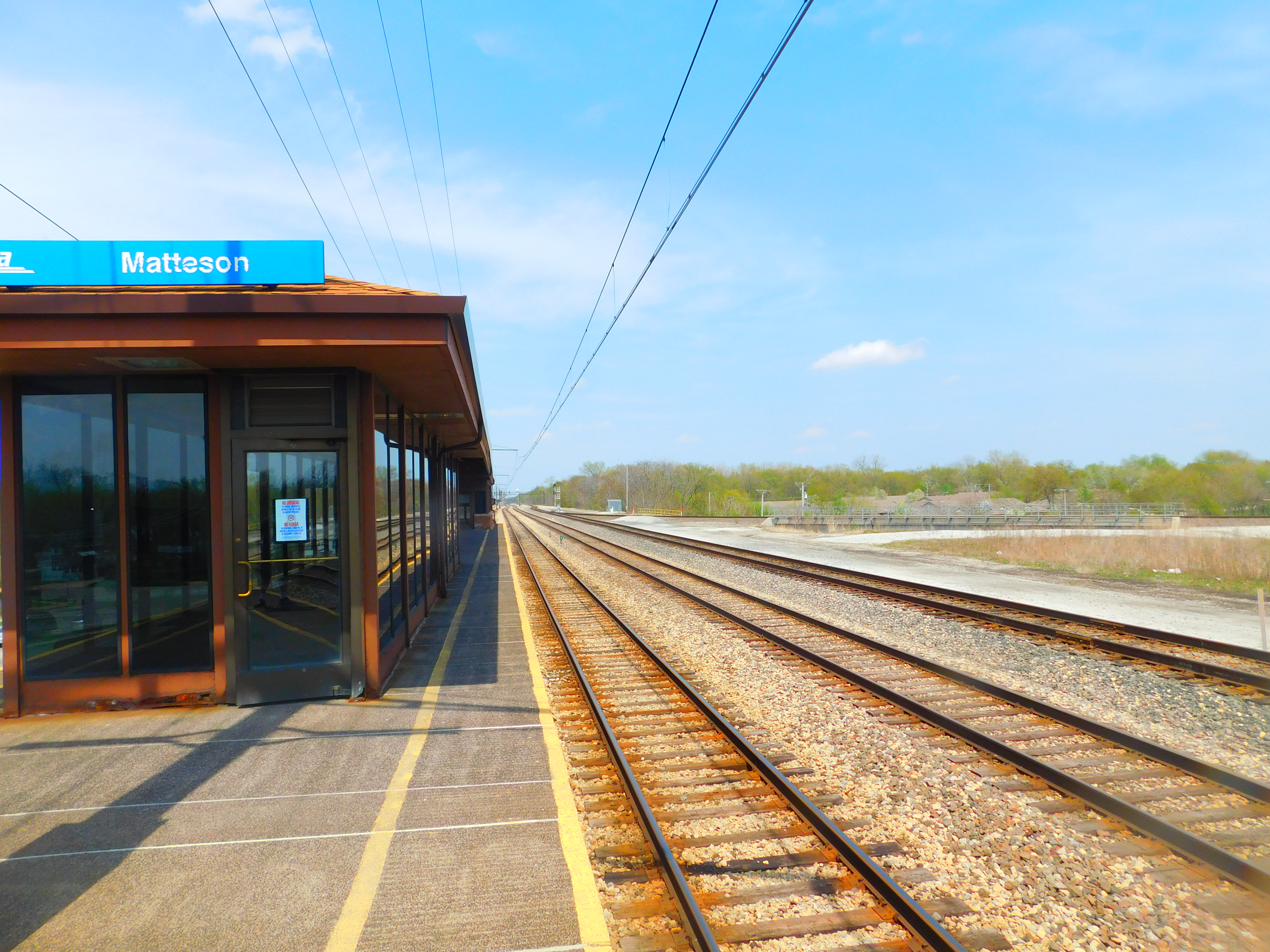
- Matteson station in April 2016

General information
- Location: 215th Street and Main Street; Matteson, Illinois
- Coordinates: 41.4985°N 87.7025°W
- Owner: Metra
- Line: University Park Sub District
- Platforms: 1 Island platform (formerly 2)
- Tracks: 2

Construction
- Structure type: Elevated
- Parking: Yes
- Accessible: No

Other information
- Fare zone: 3

History
- Opened: 1863
- Electrified: 1926

Passengers
- 2018: 591 (average weekday) ▲16.6%
- Rank: 86 out of 236

Services
Preceding station	Metra	Following station
Richton Park toward University Park	Metra Electric Main Line	211th Street toward Millennium
Former services
Preceding station	Illinois Central Railroad	Following station
Richton toward New Orleans	Main Line	Homewood toward Chicago
Richton Terminus	Electric Suburban Main Line	211th Street toward Randolph Street
Preceding station	New York Central Railroad	Following station
Frankfort toward Joliet	Joliet Division	Chicago Heights toward East Gary
Track layout
Location

Matteson is one of two commuter rail stations along the Main Branch of the Metra Electric line which serve Matteson, Illinois. It is located at 215th and Main Streets, and is 28.2 miles (45.4 km) away from the northern terminus at Millennium Station. In Metra's zone-based fare system, Matteson station is in zone 3. As of 2018, Matteson is the 86th busiest of Metra's 236 non-downtown stations, with an average of 591 weekday boardings.

Matteson station was the terminus of the IC Electric line until 1946, when it was extended to Richton Park, in order to bring the cars closer to the south end of the "IC Electric" coach storage yard. Originally built in 1863, and rebuilt in 1912, it was the southernmost station to be built before the line was electrified in 1926. Matteson is built on elevated tracks near the embankment of a bridge over Front Street. This bridge also carries the Amtrak line that runs parallel to it, carrying the City of New Orleans, Illini, and Saluki trains. Parking is available on both sides of the tracks on the south side of Front Street and a parallel bicycle path. The west side parking lot is along Main Street between the Front Street and Main Street bridges, while the larger east side parking lot is within the Village of Matteson but is actually operated by the Village of Park Forest and located on the corner of North Street, Homan Avenue, and Front Street. A pedestrian tunnel which runs beneath the tracks, is also elevated and has staircases on each end connects the two parking lots.

No bus connections are available at this station, but the Old Plank Road Trail offers a human-powered right-of-way going east and west.

There is evidence of another island platform to the east of the current platform. This served the IC long-distance trains on a non-electrified double track line—the same tracks used by Amtrak today.
