= 79th Street/Chatham station =

Commuter rail station in Chicago, Illinois

79th Street/Chatham

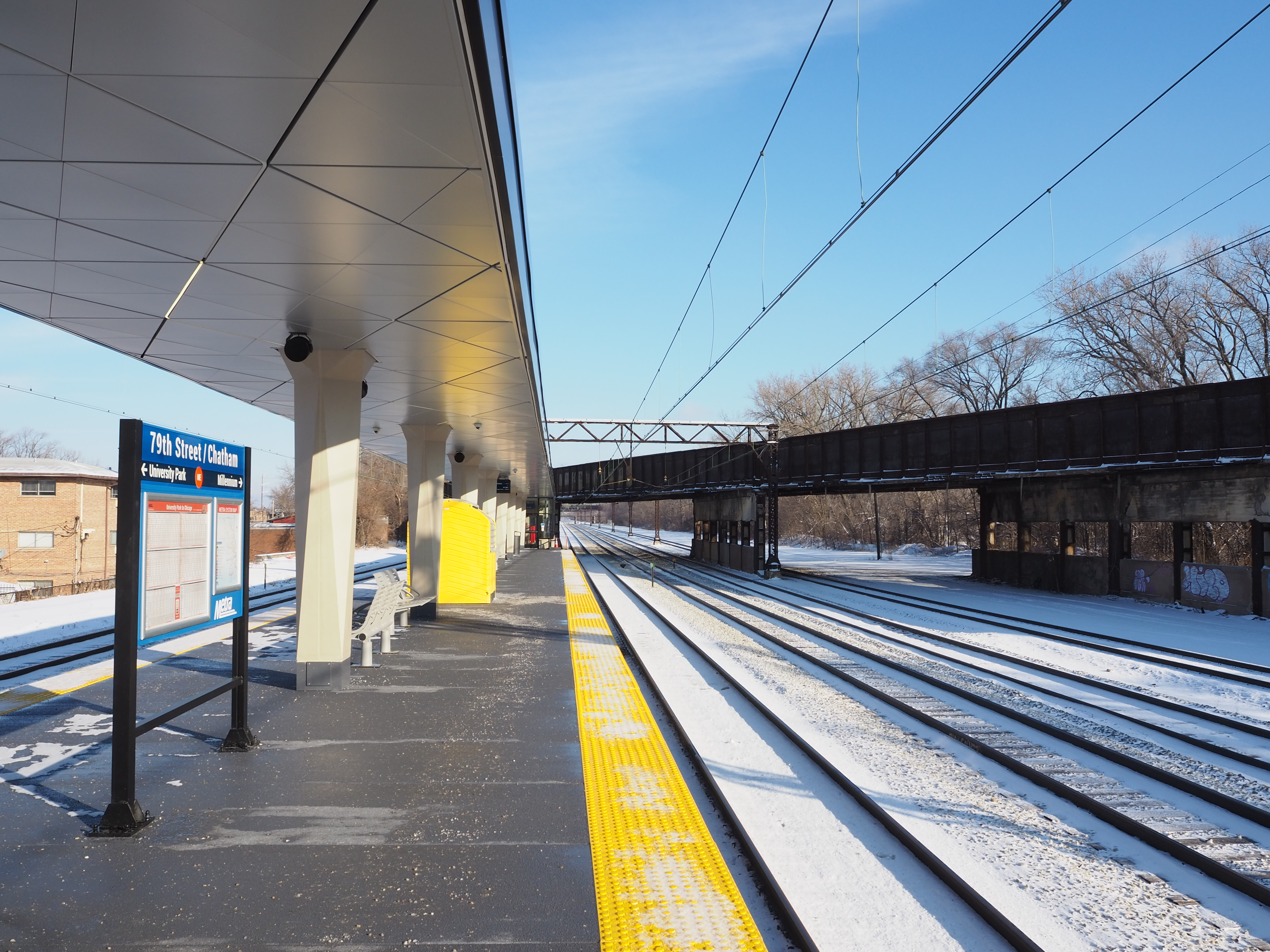
- 79th Street/Chatham station in January 2025.

General information
- Location: 79th Street between Greenwood Ave and Woodlawn Ave; Chatham, Chicago, Illinois
- Coordinates: 41.7507°N 87.5972°W
- Owner: Metra
- Line: University Park Sub District
- Platforms: 1 island platform
- Tracks: 4
- Connections: CTA Bus

Construction
- Accessible: Yes

Other information
- Fare zone: 2

History
- Rebuilt: 2023–2024
- Electrified: 1926

Passengers
- 2018: 50 (average weekday) ▼15.3%
- Rank: 212 out of 236

Services
Preceding station	Metra	Following station
83rd Street/Avalon Park toward University Park or Blue Island	Metra Electric Main Line & Blue Island Branch	75th Street/Grand Crossing toward Millennium
Former services
Preceding station	Illinois Central Railroad	Following station
83rd Street toward Richton or Blue Island	Electric Suburban Main Line & Blue Island Branch	75th Street toward Randolph Street
Track layout
Location

79th Street/Chatham is an electrified commuter rail station along the Metra Electric Main Line in the Chatham neighborhood of Chicago, Illinois. It is located at and over 79th Street, and is 9.9 miles (15.9 km) away from the northern terminus at Millennium Station. In Metra's zone-based fare system, 79th Street is in zone 2. As of 2018, the station is the 212th busiest of Metra's 236 non-downtown stations, with an average of 50 weekday boardings.

East of this station is another Metra Electric station along 79th Street (known as Cheltenham) along the South Chicago Branch. Like much of the main branch of the Metra Electric line, 79th Street-Chatham is built on elevated tracks near the embankment of a bridge over 79th Street. This bridge also carries the Amtrak line that runs parallel to it, carrying the City of New Orleans and Illini and Saluki trains. Parking is available only on the southwest corner of 79th Street and Woodlawn Avenue.

== History ==
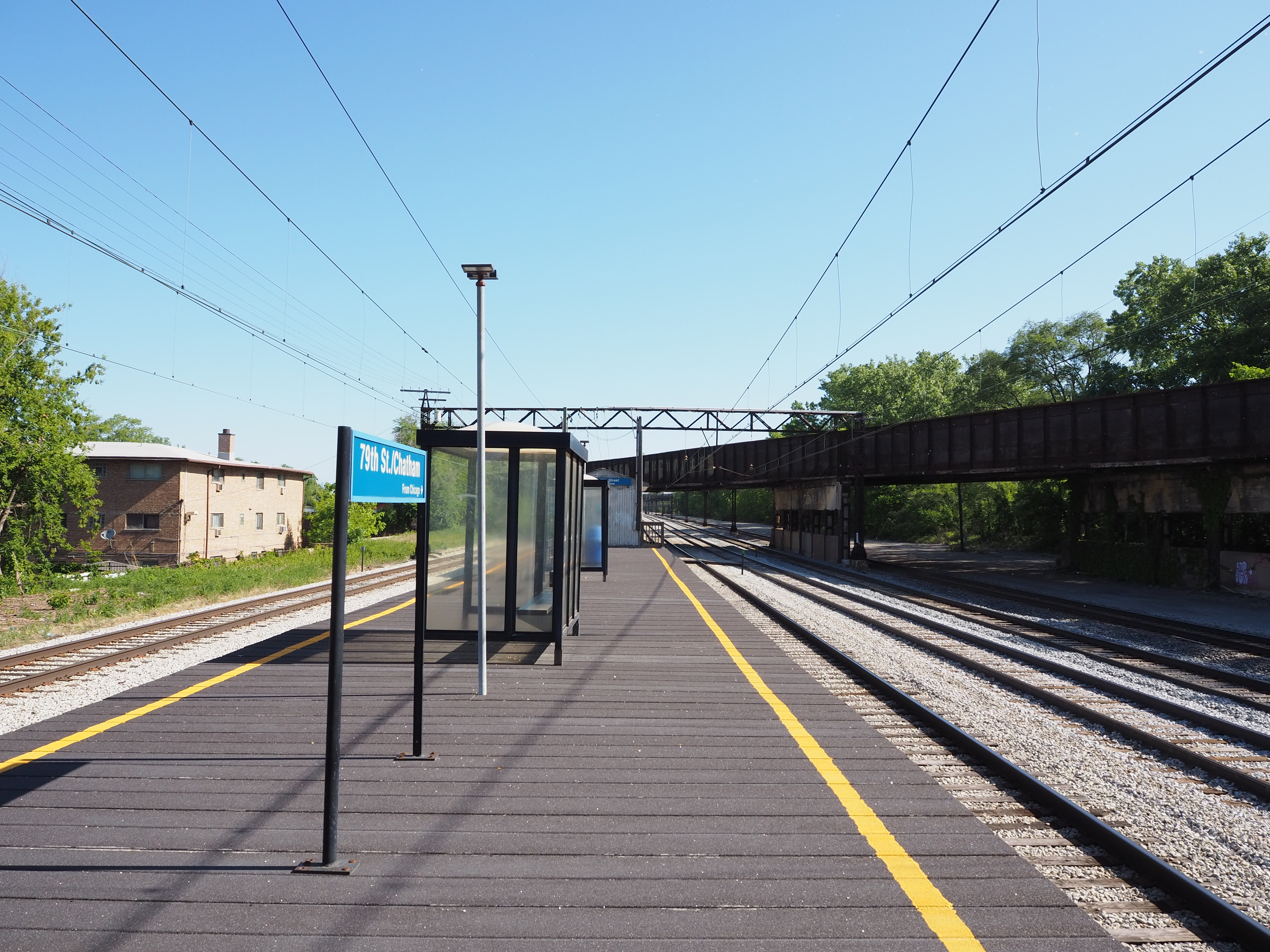
Station platform before renovation

On July 10, 2023, the station was temporarily closed for reconstruction, which involved upgrading the station and adding ADA-accessibility. The rebuild was initially expected to take seven months; however, the station's reopening was delayed by ten months to December 16, 2024.

The former Nickel Plate Railroad passed on a long bridge over the Illinois Central (the current tracks) just north of the station.

== Bus connections ==
CTA

- 79 79th (Owl Service)
