= West Chatham Bungalow Historic District =

- U.S. National Register of Historic Places
- U.S. Historic district
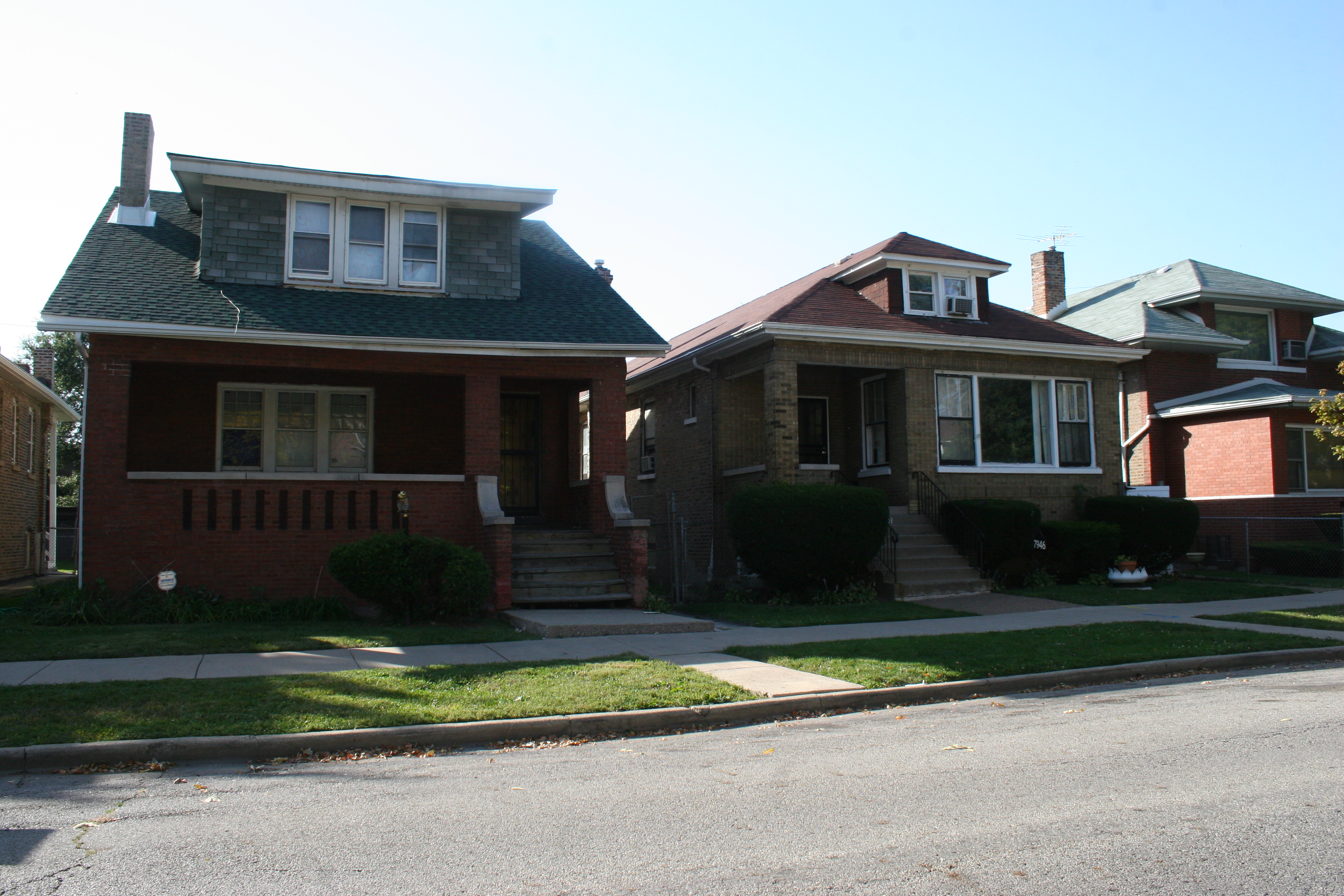

- Location within Chicago metropolitan area Location within Illinois Location within the United States
- Location: Bounded roughly by S. Perry Ave (E), 82nd St. (S), S. Stewart Ave. (W), and W. 79th St. (N), Chicago, Illinois
- Coordinates: 41°44′53″N 87°37′50″W
- Architectural style: Chicago bungalow
- MPS: Chicago Bungalows MPS
- NRHP reference No.: 10000176
- Added to NRHP: April 19, 2010

The West Chatham Bungalow Historic District is a residential historic district in the Chatham neighborhood of Chicago, Illinois. The district includes 283 Chicago bungalows built between 1913 and 1930 along with a smaller number of other residential buildings. As Chicago grew in the early 20th century and homeownership became more accessible, the bungalow arose as a popular and affordable house design, and tens of thousands of them were built in the city. Chatham, an outlying neighborhood on the city's South Side, benefited from this housing boom, as its transit connections made the area an attractive choice for new housing. The West Chatham bungalows are all brick and feature similar designs, giving the neighborhood a uniform appearance; however, decorative features such as patterned brickwork provide diversity among the homes.

The district was added to the National Register of Historic Places on April 19, 2010.
