= Garden Homes Historic District (Chicago) =

Historic district in Illinois, United States

- U.S. National Register of Historic Places
- U.S. Historic district
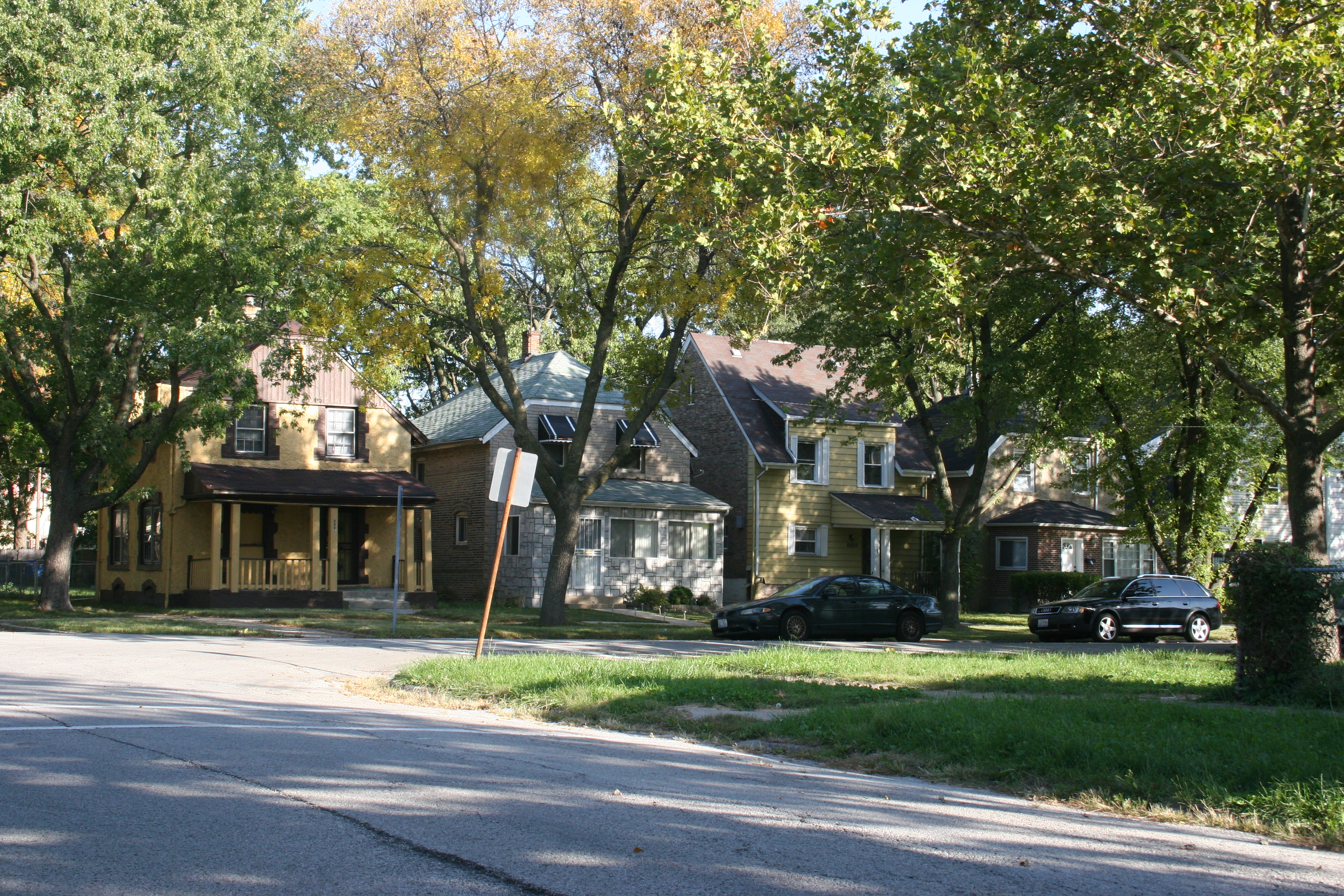

- Location within Chicago metropolitan area Location within Illinois Location within the United States
- Nearest city: Chatham, Chicago, Illinois
- Coordinates: 41°44′11″N 87°37′18″W
- Area: 40 acres (16 ha)
- Built: 1919
- Architect: Frost, Charles S.; Bright and Diamond
- Architectural style: Late 19th And 20th Century Revivals
- NRHP reference No.: 05000108
- Added to NRHP: February 28, 2005

The Garden Homes Historic District is a residential historic district located in the Chatham neighborhood of the South Side, Chicago, Illinois. The district includes 152 residential buildings, 88 of which are contributing buildings, built in 1919-20 as Chicago's first large housing project. The newly formed Chicago Housing Association, a group of 22 prominent Chicago businessmen that included J. Ogden Armour, Charles H. Wacker, and William Wrigley Jr., planned the homes as an affordable housing project for working-class Chicagoans. At the time, the city was suffering from a post-World War I housing crisis, and many of its working-class residents lived in tenements or other unlivable housing. Architect Charles Sumner Frost designed the homes, which were mainly brick cottages and stucco duplexes. The houses were built on unusually large lots for the time; the extra land was designed to serve as garden space for residents.

The district was listed on the National Register of Historic Places on February 28, 2005.

== See also ==
- National Register of Historic Places listings in South Side Chicago
