= Chicago Metropolitan Agency for Planning =

The Chicago Metropolitan Agency for Planning (CMAP) (est. 2005) is a metropolitan planning organization (MPO) responsible for comprehensive regional transportation planning in Cook, DuPage, Kane, Kendall, Lake, McHenry and Will counties in northeastern Illinois. The agency developed and now guides implementation of ON TO 2050, a new long-range plan to help the seven counties and 284 communities of northeastern Illinois implement strategies that address transportation, housing, economic development, open space, the environment, and other quality-of-life issues.

== History ==
In the summer of 2005, Public Act 094-0510 called for the creation of a new Regional Planning Board to merge operations of the Chicago Area Transportation Study (CATS) and the Northeastern Illinois Planning Commission (NIPC). For 50 years, CATS had been responsible for regional transportation planning as the federally designated metropolitan planning organization (MPO) for the Chicago region, and over the same period, NIPC was responsible for regional land-use planning. In 2006, the new organization was named the Chicago Metropolitan Agency for Planning and submitted a legislatively mandated strategic report to the Governor and General Assembly. Development of the comprehensive regional plan began in September 2007, with development of a regional vision. It continued through two years of research that culminated in 2009 with extensive public outreach that coincided with the centennial of Daniel Burnham's 1909 Plan of Chicago. The resulting "preferred regional scenario" published in January 2010 preceded release of the draft plan for comment in May 2010. And the final GO TO 2040 plan was adopted unanimously by leaders from across the seven counties on October 13, 2010, at which point the agency's efforts shifted to implementation of the plan. In 2016, CMAP began development of a successor plan called ON TO 2050, which was adopted in October 2018.

== Governance and responsibilities ==
Gerald R. Bennett (mayor of Palos Hills, Illinois) chairs the CMAP Board, whose membership features balanced representation from across the seven counties to reflect the regional consensus that led to creation of CMAP. In addition to its authorizing legislation, CMAP operates under a set of by-laws. Led by executive director Erin Aleman, the CMAP staff have diverse capabilities in comprehensive planning, data research and analysis, and many related disciplines. CMAP has committees at the policy, advisory, coordinating, and working levels that play integral roles in the agency's planning processes.

The State of Illinois legislation that created CMAP gave the agency the task of integrating the previously separate topics of land use and transportation into one agency that would protect natural resources, improve mobility, and minimize traffic congestion in the seven-county region. Under federal MAP-21 legislation, CMAP is responsible for developing the region's official transportation plan, part of the broader ON TO 2050 comprehensive plan that integrates transportation with land use, housing, economic development, open space, the environment, and other quality-of-life issues. This transportation plan must be updated every four years, use visualization techniques, engage the general public, and include a separate Transportation Improvement Program document.

Its annual work plan and budget document describe the current fiscal year's projects, and the previous year's are described in an annual report. On October 14, 2010, the U.S. Department of Housing and Urban Development (HUD) Sustainable Communities Initiative announced a three-year, $4.25 million award to CMAP for technical assistance to communities seeking to implement GO TO 2040. The grant led CMAP to create a Local Technical Assistance (LTA) program that helps communities across the Chicago metropolitan region to undertake planning projects that advance principles of the comprehensive regional plan.

== ON TO 2050 comprehensive regional plan ==
CMAP and its partners developed and are now implementing the ON TO 2050 comprehensive regional plan, which was adopted on October 10, 2018. The launch of the plan's development was featured by WTTW television in the February 23, 2016 edition of Chicago Tonight. During April–August 2017, CMAP engaged residents and stakeholder groups who were invited to comment on five "Alternative Futures." The public can also provide feedback about ON TO 2050 topics being studied for Strategy Papers and Snapshot Reports currently in development. Since 2010, the agency's activities have focused primarily on support for the implementation of GO TO 2040.

== Awards ==
CMAP has garnered awards from the American Planning Association, U.S. Environmental Protection Agency, Transportation Research Board, and more.

- American Planning Association - Illinois Chapter 2019 Daniel Burnham Award for Comprehensive Plan for ON TO 2050.
- Association of Metropolitan Planning Organizations - 2019 Outstanding Overall Achievement for an MPO serving more than 200,000 residents.
- Chicago Wilderness Force of Nature Award. In November 2018, Chicago Wilderness announced that ON TO 2050 was named a 2019 Force of Nature recipient for starting "a giant, vital conversation about the future of our region by engaging more than 100,000 residents and experts during the creation of their latest comprehensive plan".
- U.S. Environmental Protection Agency Smart Growth Award. In February 2014, the U.S. EPA announced that the GO TO 2040 comprehensive regional plan received its 2013 National Award for Smart Growth Achievement in the category of policies, programs, and plans.
- APA National Planning Excellence Award for a Planning Agency. In January 2013, the American Planning Association announced that CMAP received the first-ever National Planning Excellence Award for a Planning Agency. The award recognizes not just CMAP's but the region's planning efforts, but the many local government, business, and civic partners involved in implementing the GO TO 2040 comprehensive regional plan.
- ULI Chicago Vision Award. In June 2013, the Urban Land Institute Chicago honored the GO TO 2040 comprehensive regional plan and CMAP with one of its Vision Awards, which recognizes innovation in the development and growth of vibrant communities within the Chicago metropolitan region.
- Metropolitan Planning Council Burnham Award for Excellence in Planning. In July 2012, MPC gave CMAP its Burnham Award for Excellence in Planning for the GO TO 2040 comprehensive regional plan.
- Transportation Planning Excellence Award. In July 2012, the Transportation Research Board, Federal Highway Administration, and Federal Transit Administration gave CMAP and GO TO 2040 the national Transportation Planning Excellence Award
