= Richton Park station =

Commuter rail station in Richton Park, Illinois

Richton Park

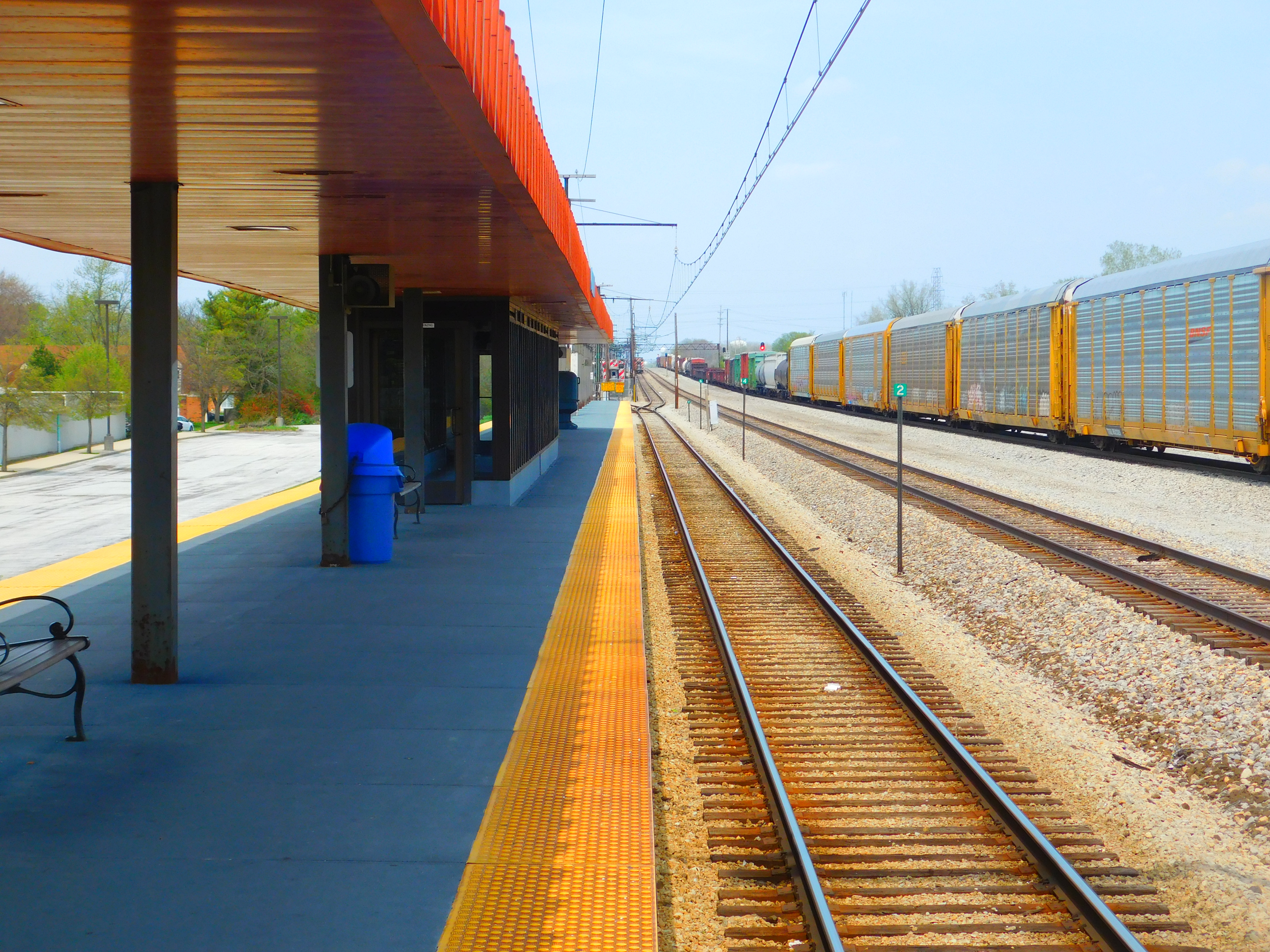
- Richton Park station in April 2016.

General information
- Location: 3807 Tower Drive; Richton Park, Illinois
- Coordinates: 41.4858°N 87.7092°W
- Owner: Metra
- Line: University Park Sub District
- Platforms: 1 island platform
- Tracks: 2
- Connections: Pace Buses

Construction
- Parking: Yes
- Accessible: Yes

Other information
- Fare zone: 3

History
- Opened: 1946
- Rebuilt: 1987

Passengers
- 2018: 1,059 (average weekday) ▼10.2%
- Rank: 47 out of 236

Services
| Preceding station | Metra | Following station |
|---|---|---|
| University Park Terminus | Metra Electric Main Line | Matteson toward Millennium |
Former services
| Preceding station | Illinois Central Railroad | Following station |
|---|---|---|
| Monee toward New Orleans | Main Line | Matteson toward Chicago |
| Terminus | Electric Suburban Main Line | Matteson toward Randolph Street |
Track layout
Location

Richton Park is the penultimate station along the main branch of the Metra Electric line, in Richton Park, Illinois. It is located on Sauk Trail, east of Governor's Highway, and is 29.3 miles (47.2 km) away from the northern terminus at Millennium Station. In Metra's zone-based fare system, Richton Park is in zone 3. As of 2018, Richton Park is the 47th busiest of Metra's 236 non-downtown stations, with an average of 1,059 weekday boardings. The station has two tracks and one island platform, with one of the tracks ending at the station.

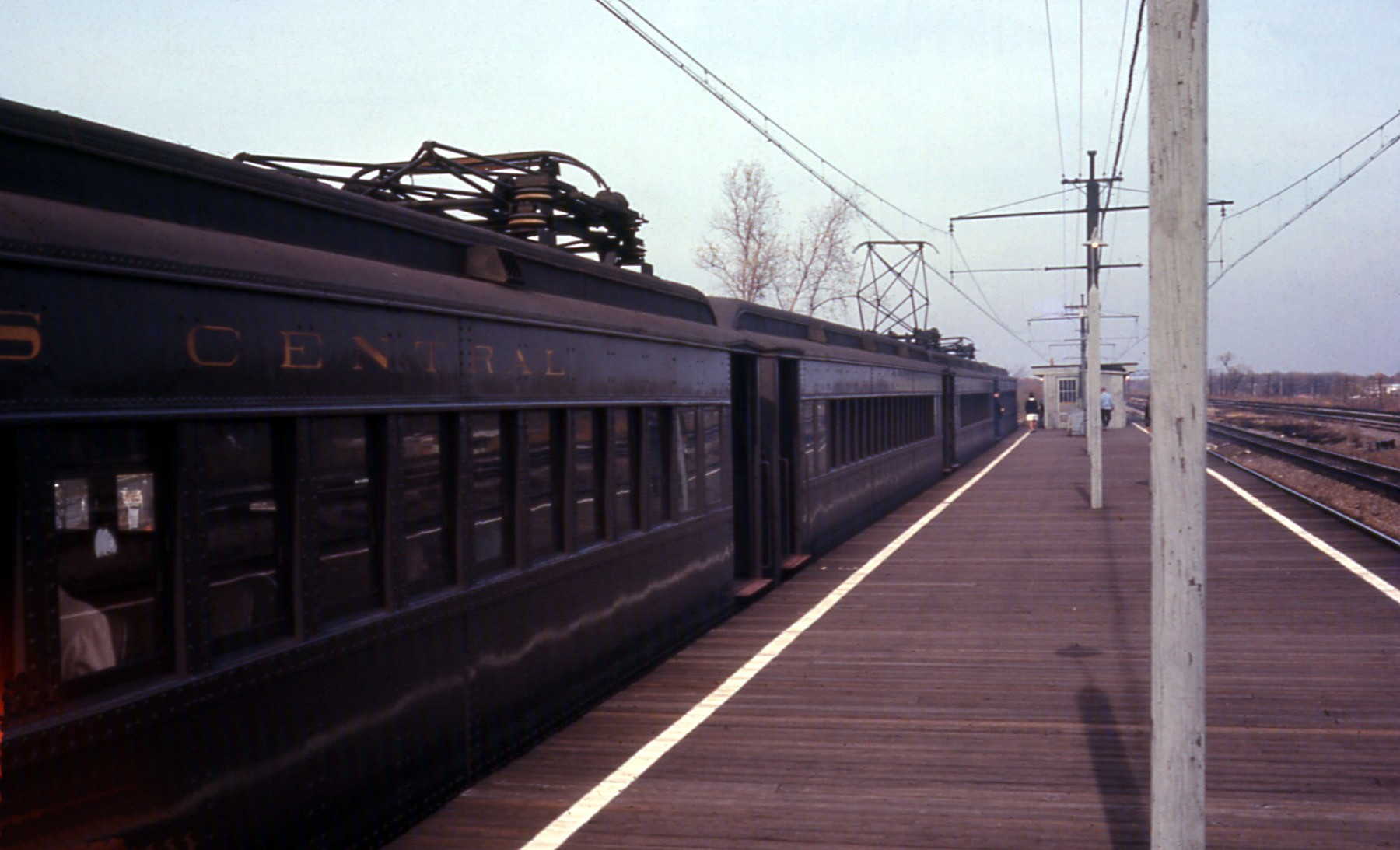
An Illinois Central train at Richton Park in 1968.

Richton Park was originally built by the Illinois Central Railroad in 1946, in order to be in close proximity to the south end of the "IC Electric" coach storage yard. It served as the terminus of the line until 1977, when the Illinois Regional Transportation Authority funded the construction of University Park station. Today, Richton Park station is a far more modern-looking structure. Parking is available on Sauk Trail between Governor's Highway and Richton Square Road, on Richton Road, Mill Drive, and along Tower Road.
