= Beverly/Morgan Railroad District =

Coordinates: 41.7137°N 87.6674°W

The Beverly/Morgan Railroad District is a historic district in the Beverly, Morgan Park, and Washington Heights community areas of Chicago, Illinois, United States. It was designated a Chicago Landmark on April 15, 1995.

The district consists of the six train stations at 91st, 95th, 99th, 107th, 111th and 115th Streets along the Rock Island District commuter line of Metra. The stations were built between 1889 and 1945 by various architects.

In 2017, the 115th Station suffered a devastating fire that resulted in its demolition.
