= Sutherland Elementary School (Chicago) =

Elizabeth H. Sutherland Elementary School

Location
- 10015 S. Leavitt St. Chicago, Illinois; United States; 41.7113°N 87.6765°W

Information
- School type: Public
- Established: 1925; 101 years ago
- NCES School ID: 170993001118
- Principal: Margaret Moore Burns
- Teaching staff: 37.5 (on an FTE basis)
- Grades: K–8
- Gender: Coed
- Enrollment: 672 (2019–20)
- Student to teacher ratio: 16.11
- Campus size: 5 acres (2.0 ha)
- Campus type: Urban
- Colors: Maroon and gold
- Nickname: The Bulldogs
- Website: sutherland.cps.edu

Elizabeth H. Sutherland Elementary School is a public K-8 school located in the Beverly neighborhood on the south side of Chicago, Illinois. It is part of the Chicago Public Schools system. The school is named for Chicago educator Elizabeth "Bessie" Huntington Sutherland, the first woman principal in Cook County. The current building was opened in 1925, one year after Sutherland's death.

== History ==
Elizabeth "Bessie" Sutherland (née Huntington) was a prominent educator on the south side of Chicago throughout the late 1800s and early 1900s. Born in 1851 in Blue Island and educated at the Cook County Normal School, Sutherland was strongly influenced by the progressive era of education and the advent of common schools. After working at several schools, she took employment at the Washington Heights School, now called the Alice L. Barnard School of Chicago. She was appointed principal in 1883, making her the first woman to be principal of a school in Cook County. Eventually, Sutherland had three schools, 19 teachers and 800 students under her charge. Sutherland was also responsible for a set of portable classrooms on the corner of 100th and Leavitt streets to accommodate the growing population of Beverly students. Sutherland retired as principal in 1923 and died in 1924. The year following her death, a permanent school building was constructed at the site of the portable classrooms. It was named Elizabeth H. Sutherland Elementary School in her honor.

In 2011, following years of budget cuts and the elimination of the school's music teacher position, parents formed the Sutherland Foundation for Education and Enrichment. The charitable foundation seeks to enhance the quality and depth of the school's education program. The foundation secures and distributes funding through grand opportunities, local donations, corporate sponsorships, and the personalized paver program on the grounds of the school.

In 2013, French teacher Alan Wax discovered a scrapbook in a school storeroom which was created by the Sutherland PTA (which was formed in 1927) with historical accounts of the first 25 years of the school by the first principal, Lilias Williamson. This discovery prompted research by the Ridge Historical Society. The scrapbook and Chicago Tribune research revealed that the school building was in dire need of repair due to faulty design and cheap construction. In her history, Williamson congratulates local fathers for their "vital interest shown in assuring safe housing for the children, in obtaining from the Board of Education, emergency action, as far as the safety of the school was concerned, and by their unremitting demands until permanent and complete repairs were made in 1929 and 1930.” The scrapbook remains in the care of the Ridge Historical Society.

== Campus ==
Sutherland Elementary occupies one city block at the 100th and Leavitt streets in Chicago, Illinois. The building was constructed in the early 1920s and completed in 1925. A gym annex is located behind the main building. The campus includes two parking lots, a playground, and an open field. The buildings are accompanied by two large smoke stacks, each equipped with cell phone antennae mounted near the top. The location of the antennae have been a point of concern for the parents of students in the mid 2010s.

At the front entrance of Sutherland Elementary is a flower garden named the "peace garden," next to which is a flag pole named the "peace pole." The garden was created by members of the faculty in 2002 following the September 11 attacks. In 2018, it was redesigned and rededicated after a successful fundraiser led by students and parents. Since then, the school hosts an International Peace Day ceremony each year at the garden.

== Demographics ==
The Sutherland Elementary student body comes from an area that includes a large portion of the neighborhood of Beverly. For prospective students outside the attendance boundary, admission may be gained through the GoCPS Options enrollment program if there are available seats. During the 2019–20 school year, in which Sutherland Elementary had a student body of 672, 59.8% of students were classified as non-Hispanic Black, 30.8% non-Hispanic White, 7.2% Hispanic, 0.5% Asian, and 1.8% multi/other. 40.9% of Sutherland students were labeled by Chicago Public Schools as economically disadvantaged and 11.9% of students were identified as "Diverse Learners." As of 2019, 199 students qualified for a free lunch.

Margaret Moore "Meg" Burns, a former Sutherland Elementary parent and local resident for over 25 years, serves as principal, a position she has held since September 2017. As of the 2019–20 academic year, the school employs a teaching faculty of 37.5 (on an FTE basis) for an average student–teacher ratio of 16.11 to 1. Additional staff members include an assistant principal, two case managers, support staff, aides, tutors, guidance counselors, and administration.

== Academics ==
Sutherland Elementary is a traditional district school. It participates in the International Baccalaureate Middle Years Program in which all students are enrolled starting in grade 6. The school's daily attendance rate is 96.3% for students and 93.8% for teachers and both rates have remained above 90% since 2013.

Since the 2014–15 academic year, Sutherland Elementary has received three Level 1+ ratings, the highest rating for CPS' School Quality Rating Policy (SQRP). The overall score is determined from student attainment and growth on the NWEA MAP test, student attendance, My Voice and My School surveys, student growth on ACCESS for English Learners, and data quality of the report. The following table shows Sutherland Elementary's overall rating and accountability status on all SQRP reports since its inception in 2014–15.

CPS School Quality Rating Report Summary
Academic Year	Overall Rating (Note: Order of ratings from highest to lowest: Level 1+, Level 1, Level 2+, Level 2, Level 3)	Accountability Status
2014–15	Level 1+	Good Standing
2015–16	Level 1	Good Standing
2016–17	Level 2+	Good Standing
2017–18	Level 1	Good Standing
2018–19	Level 1+	Good Standing
2019–20	Level 1+	Good Standing

== Extracurricular activities ==
Many of the extracurricular activities offered at Sutherland Elementary offer an extension of classroom subjects and an opportunity for students to pursue those studies in additional depth. Within the creative program, chorus, creative writing, drama, art, and orchestra and band are offered as optional activities. Students in these groups have opportunities to perform and exhibit their work throughout the year. Book Club, Technology Club, Art Club, Writers Workshop, and Science Club also offer opportunities to build on classroom activities.

Sutherland Elementary offers to grade 8 students the opportunity to participate in the Community Project as part of the IB Middle Years Program. After two years of collecting service hours, students complete a community service-based project in which they explore their right and responsibility to have a positive impact on their communities through service and action.

The Sutherland Athletic Association and Athletic Board aims "to support an athletic program that fosters the development of children and challenges all students to reach their maximum potential." As of the 2019–20 academic year, seven sports programs are offered: Coed soccer (grades K–8), coed cross country (grades 5–8), and girls' basketball (grades 4–8) in the fall; boys' basketball (grades 3–8) and girls' volleyball (grades 3–8) in the winter; and coed track and field (grades 5–8) and boys' volleyball (grades 4–8) in the spring. There are no team tryouts and all students in good academic standing are free to participate. Sutherland Elementary sports teams are known as the "bulldogs."

== I Madonnari Italian Street Painting Festival ==
Since 2002, Sutherland Elementary PTA has hosted the annual "I Madonnari Italian Street Painting Festival." It is modeled after a festival of the same name which has been hosted by the Children's Creative Project in Santa Barbara County, California since 1987. The festival has since been replicated in communities across the western hemisphere. The popular community event has featured the work of professional artists on sidewalks around the school property as well as the creations of students and amateur artists. People are invited to purchase a sidewalk square and decorate it with pastel chalks supplied to participants. The festival also features entertainment, a food and bake sale, and face painting.
