= Longwood Drive District =

Coordinates: 41°42′13″N 87°40′15″W

The Longwood Drive District is a historic district in Chicago, Illinois. The houses along Longwood Drive in the Beverly neighborhood were built beginning in 1873 by various architects. Longwood was named for a long copse of trees that ran along the lee side of the hill where the rest of Beverly is located. The area was designated a Chicago Landmark on November 13, 1981. The Longwood Drive has a mixture of different styles of architecture, such as Italianate, Carpenter Gothic, Queen Anne, Shingle, Prairie School, and Renaissance Revival.
