= 123rd Street station =

Commuter rail station in Blue Island, Illinois

123rd Street Blue Island

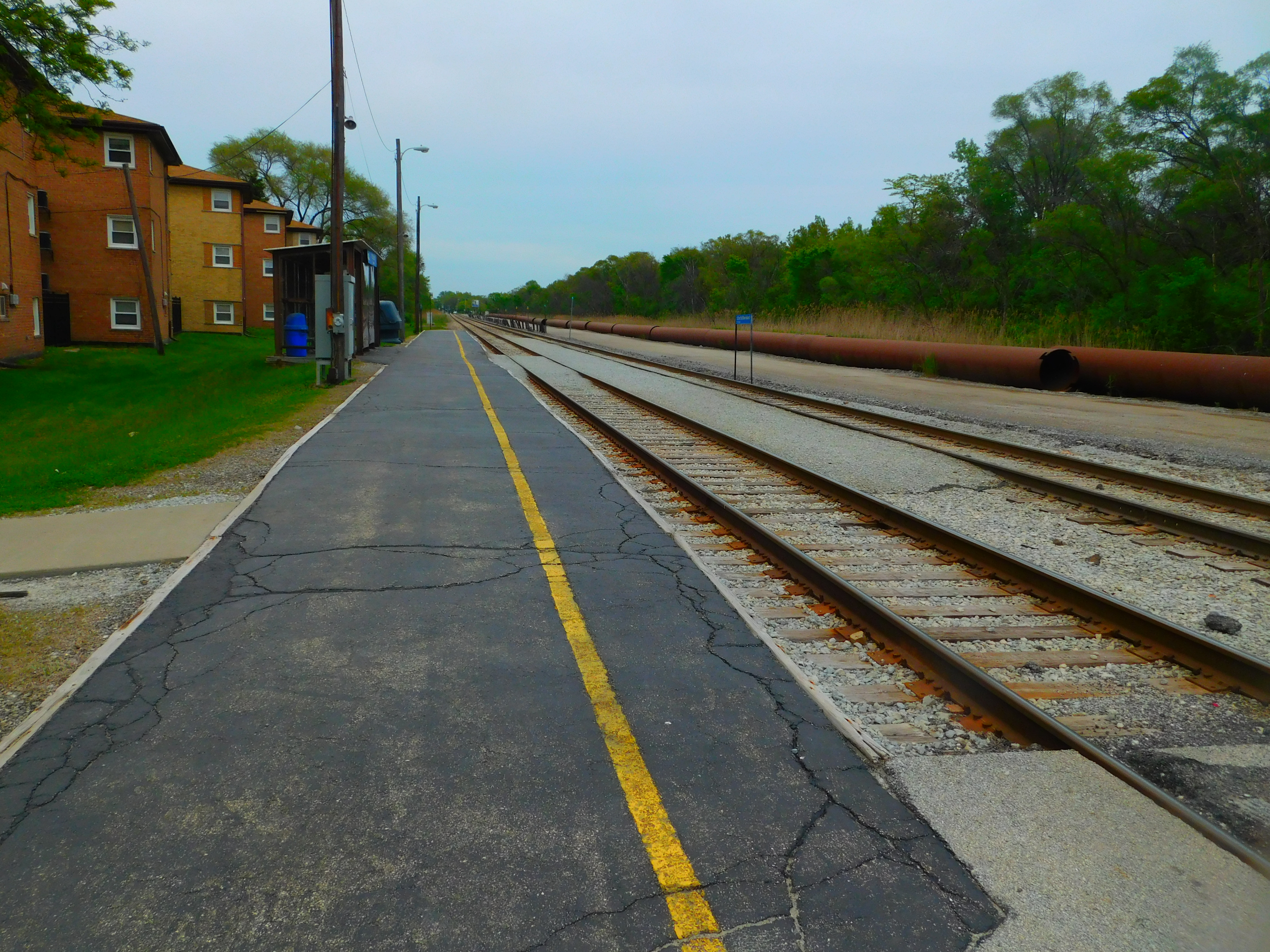
- 123rd Street station in May 2016

General information
- Location: 2120 West 123rd Street; Blue Island, Illinois, U.S.
- Coordinates: 41.6703°N 87.6737°W
- Owner: Metra
- Line: Beverly Subdistrict
- Platforms: 1 side platform
- Tracks: 2

Construction
- Parking: Yes
- Accessible: No

Other information
- Fare zone: 2

Passengers
- 2018: 53 (average weekday) ▲17.8%
- Rank: 211 out of 236

Services
Preceding station	Metra	Following station
Prairie Street weekday limited toward Joliet	Rock Island Beverly Branch	119th Street toward LaSalle
Former services
Preceding station	Chicago, Rock Island and Pacific Railroad	Following station
Blue Island Prairie Street toward Joliet	Suburban Service via Beverly	Blue Island 119th Street toward Chicago
Track layout
Location

123rd Street is one of four Metra railroad stations in Blue Island, Illinois, along the Beverly Branch of the Rock Island District Line, and five within Blue Island generally. It is 15.2 miles (24.5 km) from LaSalle Street Station, the northern terminus of the line, and is named after and located on 123rd Street. In Metra's zone-based fare system, 123rd Street is in zone 2. As of 2018, 123rd Street is the 211th busiest of Metra's 236 non-downtown stations, with an average of 53 weekday boardings.

As of June 2026, 123rd Street is served by 13 trains (7 inbound and 6 outbound) on weekdays only.

123rd Street was originally in zone D of Metra's zone-based fare system, but was moved into zone C as part of a pilot program that lowered fares on the Rock Island and Metra Electric District lines.

Parking is available on the northeast side of the tracks north along 123rd Street. The station is little more than an enclosed sheltered platform, and is a flag stop. No bus connections are available.
