= William and Jessie M. Adams House =

House in Chicago, Illinois

Coordinates: 41.7240°N 87.6701°W

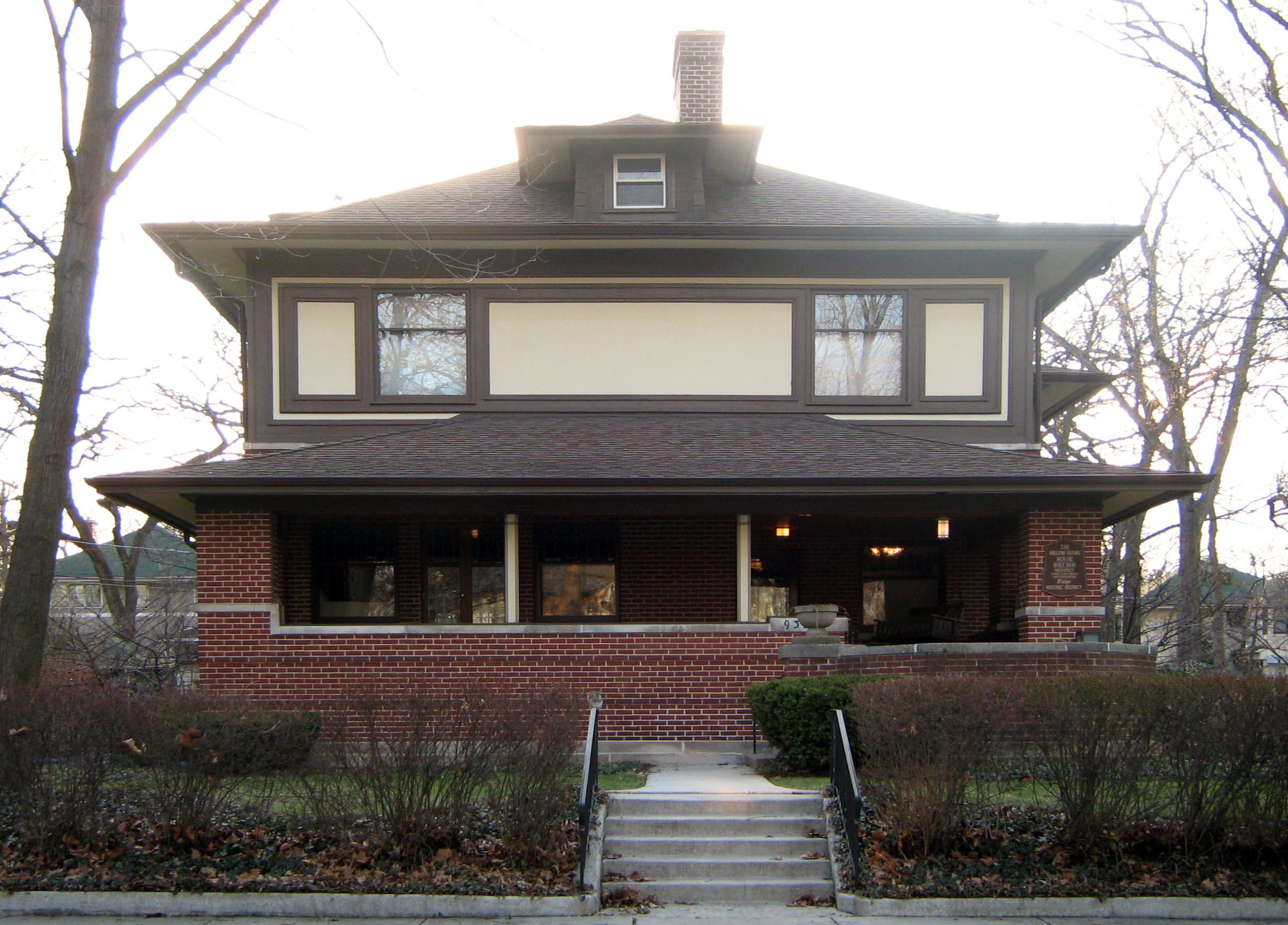
- Interactive map of the William and Jessie M. Adams House area

General information
- Location: 9326 S. Pleasant Ave.
- Construction started: 1900
- Completed: 1901

Chicago Landmark
- Designated: June 16, 1994

The William and Jessie M. Adams House is a Prairie style house at 9326 South Pleasant Avenue in the Beverly neighborhood of Chicago, Illinois.

== Description and history ==
The house was built between 1900 and 1901 and its design is credited to Frank Lloyd Wright, although there is some dispute about this. The squarish design, double-hung windows and sizeable third-floor attic were not standard features of Wright-designed homes at this time, and some scholars believe this home may have actually been designed by William Adams himself, who served as a contractor on several Wright homes.

The house was designated a Chicago landmark on June 16, 1994, and a Chicago Landmark plaque is embedded into the ground in front of the home.

In March 2014, the house was sold for $980,000 after being owned by the same family since 1952.

== See also ==
- List of Frank Lloyd Wright works
