= Prairie Street station =

Commuter rail station in Blue Island, Illinois

Prairie Street Blue Island

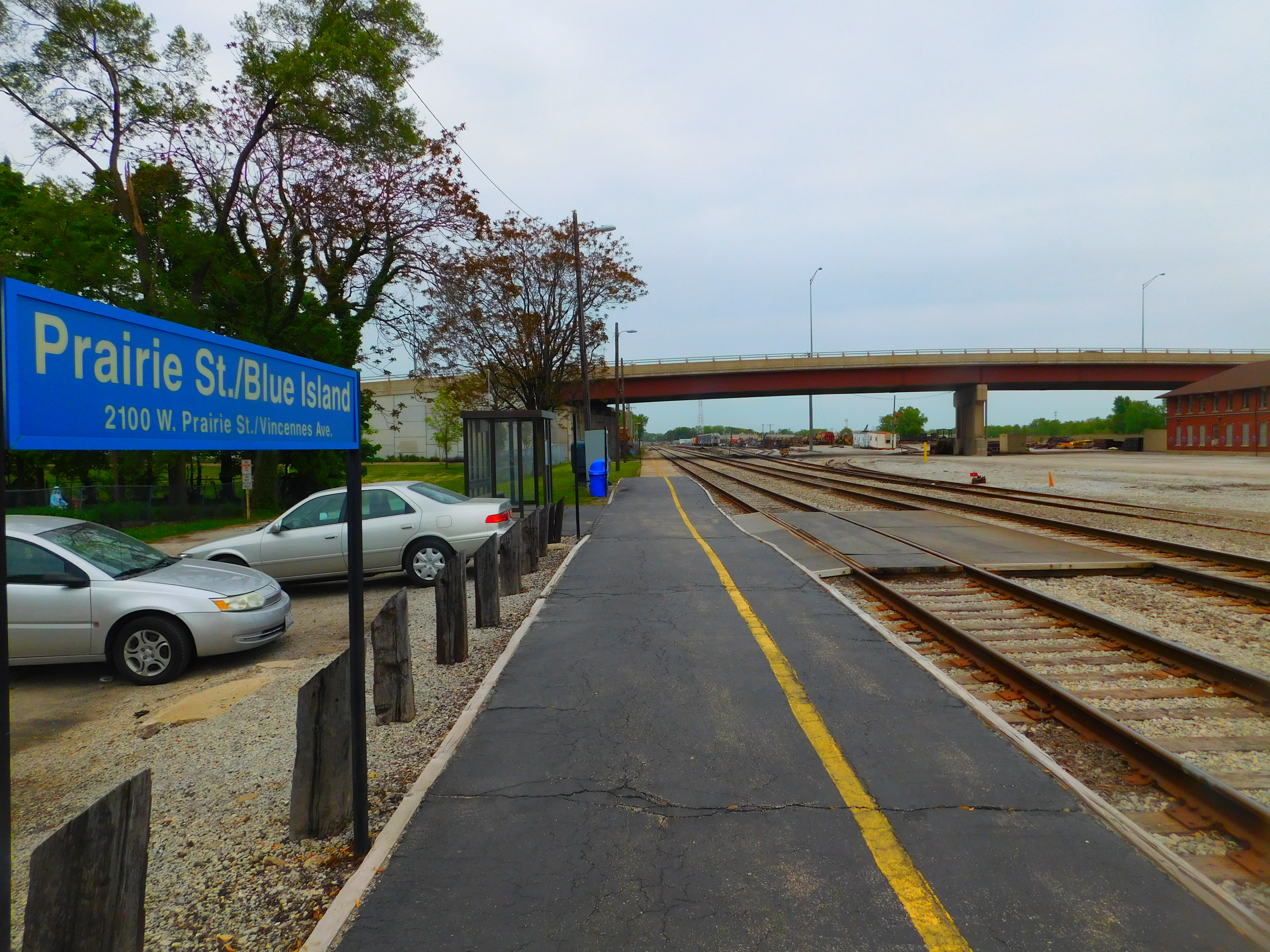

General information
- Location: 2100 West Prairie Street; Blue Island, Illinois
- Coordinates: 41.6620°N 87.6752°W
- Owner: Metra
- Line: Beverly Subdistrict
- Platforms: 1 side platform
- Tracks: 2

Construction
- Parking: Yes
- Accessible: No

Other information
- Fare zone: 2

Passengers
- 2018: 30 (average weekday) ▲50%
- Rank: 220 out of 236

Services
Preceding station	Metra	Following station
Blue Island/Vermont Street toward Joliet	Rock Island Beverly Branch	123rd Street weekday limited toward LaSalle
Former services
Preceding station	Chicago, Rock Island and Pacific Railroad	Following station
Blue Island Vermont Street toward Joliet	Suburban Service via Beverly	Blue Island 123rd Street toward Chicago
Track layout
Location

Prairie Street is one of four Metra railroad stations in Blue Island, Illinois along the Beverly Branch of the Rock Island District Line, and one of five total within the town of Blue Island. It is 15.8 miles (25.4 km) from LaSalle Street Station, the northern terminus of the line, and is both located on and named after Prairie Street. In Metra's zone-based fare system, Prairie Street is in zone 2. As of 2018, Prairie Street is the 220th busiest of Metra's 236 non-downtown stations, with an average of 30 weekday boardings.

As of June 2026, Prairie Street is served by 13 trains (7 inbound and 6 outbound) on weekdays only.

Parking is available on both sides of the tracks at a dead end of Prairie Street, south of the Burr Oak Avenue Bridge, which also crosses the main line and the freight yards between the two lines, the Burr Oak Yard on the north side of the bridge and the Iowa Interstate Railroad-Chicago Rail Link. No bus connections are available.
