= Chicago High School for Agricultural Sciences =

Location
- 3857 West 111th Street; Chicago, Illinois 60655; United States; 41.6904°N 87.7172°W

Information
- School type: Public; Secondary; Magnet
- Motto: "Learning to do, Doing to Learn, Earning to Live, Living to Serve."
- Opened: 1985
- School district: Chicago Public Schools
- CEEB code: 140723
- Principal: William Edwin Hook
- Grades: 9–12
- Gender: Coed
- Enrollment: 764 (2025–2026)
- Average class size: 30
- Campus size: 72-acre (290,000 m^{2})
- Campus type: Urban
- Colors: Green; Gold
- Athletics conference: Chicago Public League
- Team name: Cyclones
- Accreditation: North Central Association of Colleges and Schools
- Website: chicagoagr.org

The Chicago High School for Agricultural Sciences (CHSAS) is a public 4–year magnet high school located in the Mount Greenwood neighborhood on the far south side of Chicago, Illinois, United States. The school is operated by the Chicago Public Schools district. CHSAS opened for the 1985–86 school year in August 1985. The school has a 72-acre (290,000 m^{2}) campus, 40 acres (160,000 m^{2}) of which are a working farm (built on the site of the last farm in Chicago).

== History ==
The school was opened in 1985 by the Chicago Public Schools as a high school devoted to teaching agricultural science to urban students. It is located in the Mount Greenwood neighborhood of the city. It was the second high school of this kind to open in the United States.

== Academics ==
All students are members of the FFA (formerly Future Farmers of America), the school's motto is that of FFA. The school claims that it is the organization's largest Illinois chapter, and the fifth largest in the nation. The school's academic program differs from traditional high schools because of the six different career pathway programs implemented into the school's curriculum. The six pathways are Agricultural Finance and Economics, Agricultural Mechanics and Technology, Animal Science, Food Science and Technology, Horticulture, and Urban Agricultural Education. These pathways provide experience in the pathway's field of focus to encourage engagement in agriculture. The school also implements a point system for participation in out-of-school agricultural related activities.

The school’s working farm

== Athletics ==
CHSAS competes in the Chicago Public League and is a member of the Illinois High School Association (IHSA). Teams are stylized as the Cyclones. The girls' basketball team were Class A Regional champions in 2003–04. The boys' golf team were Class AA and Public League champions in 2000–01.

== Student life ==
In 2012, CHSAS began a partnership with The Nature Conservancy's Leaders in Environmental Action for the Future (LEAF) program. This program offers paid internships to a select number of students from CHSAS and helps staff develop resources. The school sponsors six sports for young men and women, an additional four for young men, and an additional five for young women. The school also sponsors athletes who compete in the Special Olympics. The school also sponsors 17 extracurricular clubs and activities. Those that are chapters of nationally notable organizations include the National Honor Society (NHS). The school frequently partners with local businesses such as Eli's Cheesecake and Horse Thief Hollow.
