= William Cunningham (Illinois politician) =

American politician

Bill Cunningham

President pro tempore of the Illinois Senate
- Incumbent
- Assumed office January 30, 2020
- Preceded by: Don Harmon (2019)

Member of the Illinois Senate from the 18th district
- Incumbent
- Assumed office January 9, 2013
- Preceded by: Edward Maloney

Member of the Illinois House of Representatives from the 35th district
- In office January 12, 2011 – January 9, 2013
- Preceded by: John O'Sullivan
- Succeeded by: Frances Ann Hurley

Personal details
- Born: August 12, 1967 (age 58) Chicago, Illinois, U.S.
- Party: Democratic
- Education: University of Illinois Chicago (BA)

Bill Cunningham (born August 12, 1967) is a Democratic member of the Illinois Senate, representing the 18th District. The 18th district includes all or parts of Beverly, Mount Greenwood, Morgan Park and Auburn-Gresham in Chicago and the suburbs of Evergreen Park, Chicago Ridge, Oak Lawn, Worth, Palos Heights and Orland Park.

Prior to his election to the Illinois Senate, he was a member of the Illinois House of Representatives, representing the 35th District.

== Illinois Senate ==
After the election of President of the Illinois Senate, Don Harmon (the former President pro tempore) named Cunningham as President pro tempore of the Illinois Senate on January 30, 2020. In September 2025, it was reported that Cunningham would not run for reelection in the 2026 general election.

=== Committee assignments ===
As of July 2022, Senator Cunningham is a member of the following Illinois Senate committees:

- Agriculture Committee (SAGR)
- Appropriations - Agriculture, Environment & Energy Committee (SAPP-SAAE)
- Appropriations - Higher Education Committee (SAPP-SAHE)
- Appropriations Committee (SAPP)
- Assignment Committee (SCOA)
- Energy and Public Utilities Committee (SENE)
- Ethics Committee (SETH)
- Executive Committee (SEXC)
- Executive Appointments Committee (SEXA)
- (Chairman of) Executive - Gaming Committee (SEXC-SESG)
- Executive - Liquor Committee (SEXC-SELI)
- Higher Education Committee (SCHE)
- Redistricting Committee (SRED)
- Redistrcting - Chicago South (SRED-SRCS)

Illinois Senate
Vacant Title last held by Don Harmon; 2019	President pro tempore of the Illinois Senate; 2020–present	Incumbent
