= Richard H. Lawler =

Transplant pioneer

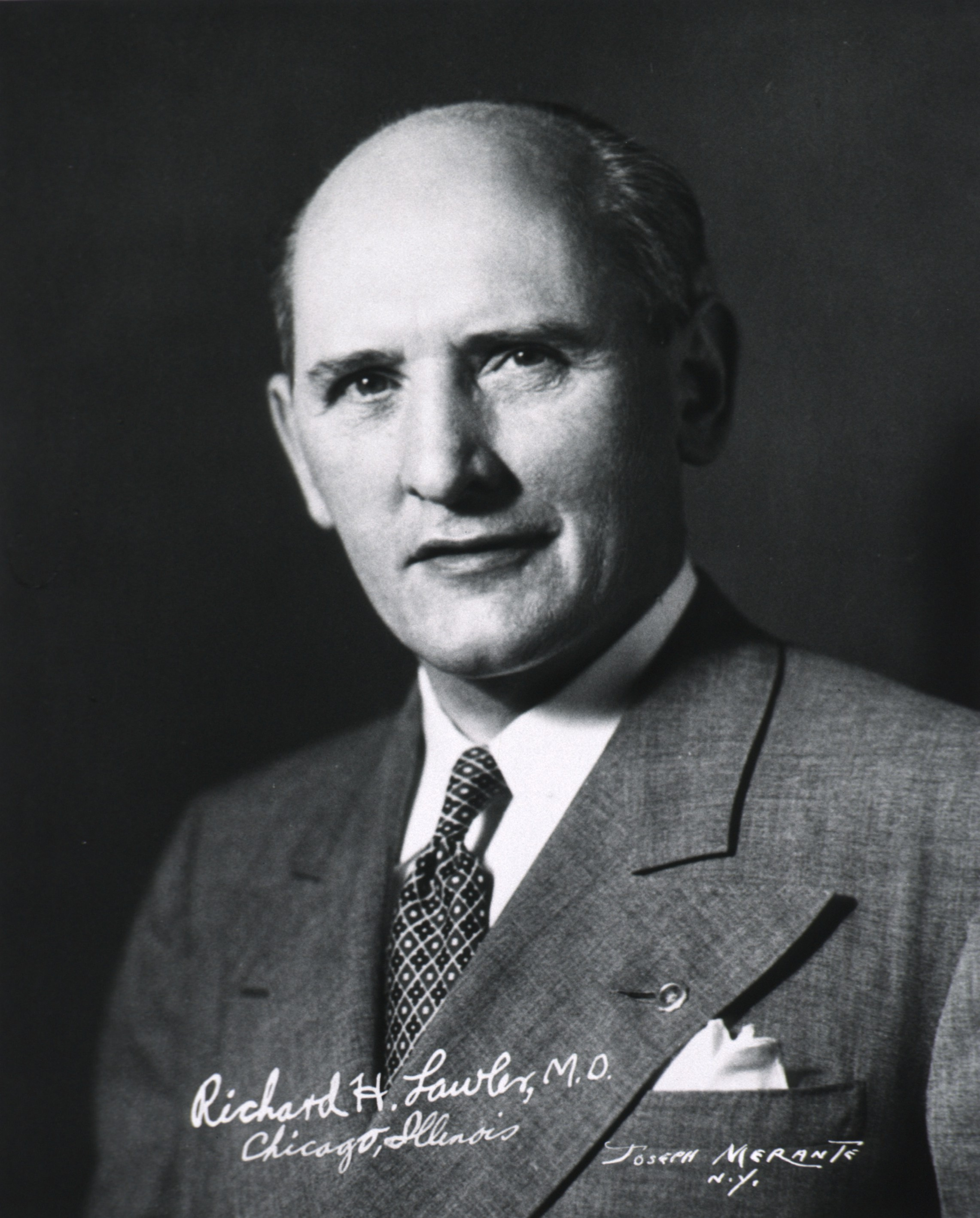

Richard H. Lawler, M.D. (August 12, 1895 — July 24, 1982) led a surgical team at Little Company of Mary Hospital in Evergreen Park, Illinois, that performed on June 17, 1950, what Time magazine described as "the first human kidney transplant on record." With surgeons James West and Raymond Murphy, Lawler transplanted a kidney from a just-deceased female patient into the abdominal cavity of a 44-year-old woman with polycystic kidney disease. The surgeons described the groundbreaking operation in an article in the Journal of the American Medical Association (JAMA).

== Early life and education ==
Lawler was the son of a Chicago grocer and an Irish immigrant mother. Born in Chicago on August 12, 1895, he was the third of eight children. Three of his younger brothers — Frank and identical twins Edmund and Paul —also became medical doctors. He served in the U.S. Navy during World War I, piloting a single-engine Curtiss Model F, the so-called flying boat. Prior to college and medical school, he also taught and coached football at a Chicago High School. Lawler graduated from DePaul University in Chicago and earned his medical degree from Loyola University Chicago Stritch School of Medicine in 1931.

== Career ==
After an internship at Mercy Hospital in Chicago, Lawler joined the medical staff of Little Company of Mary in 1932. It was at the Catholic, 587-bed community hospital run by an order of British-based nuns that he led the 1950 kidney transplant. Newsweek, noting that no vital human organ had ever been moved from one person to another, called the transplant a "daring surgical feat."

The 45-minute operation and its aftermath was chronicled in a book by Edmund O. Lawler, the surgeon's great-nephew, titled "The Graft: How a Pioneering Operation Sparked the Modern Age of Organ Transplants." The patient, Ruth Tucker, a 44-year-old Chicago woman, lived five more years before dying of heart disease on April 30, 1955. However, the transplanted kidney only functioned from a little more than two months, but not more than 10 months—the point at which surgeons re-opened Tucker's surgical incision to discover her body's immune system had rejected the transplanted kidney. Lawler wrote in 1972 that he could not fully account for Tucker's prolonged survival: "It may be that the transplant took the load off the other diseased kidney."

Lawler's bold venture encouraged surgeons at the world's leading medical centers in Paris and Boston to start attempting kidney transplants. Famed French surgeon Rene Kuss acknowledged the operation's influence: "Lawler had an extraordinary impact. It gave us reason to believe that transplant surgery was possible in human beings."

But the transplant operation also triggered a backlash. Some doctors condemned the surgery because immunosuppressive drugs and tissue-type matching were not yet fully developed. Lawler was rebuked by his professional society, the American Urological Association, which called for a moratorium on transplants. "I was ostracized by much of the profession," Lawler recalled in a 1972 interview with a medical publication. "There were so few supporters. Some of my good friends wouldn't even talk to me for fear that I would contaminate them."

And even though the transplant operation took place in a Catholic hospital and was approved by the nun who headed it, some Catholic clergy denounced the operation. Surgeon James West explained: "The clergy in particular opposed this procedure — they were opposed to the idea that you could take tissue from someone and put it in someone who was alive, and it would come back to life."

Lawler continued his urological and surgical career until his retirement in 1979. But he never performed another transplant. "We just wanted to get it started," he said in an interview. "For our group to have done another (transplant) would have been like waving a red flag in front of a bull."

Lawler's reputation, however, recovered in time. In 1970, he was nominated for a Nobel Prize in Physiology or Medicine for his role in the first solid organ transplant in the history of medicine. In 1974, he was feted at a symposium in his honor at Little Company of Mary attended by more than 300 guests, including transplant surgeons from the leading transplant centers in the Midwest. Lawler was hailed in a 2014 medical trade publication as one of world's nine top nine medical pioneers for their "important firsts in medicine" that ranged from Louis Pasteur's germ theory of disease to Francis Crick's foundation of molecular biology. According to the article, Lawler's "success paved the way for others to see the possibility of organ transplant as a viable treatment option."

In addition to his role at Little Company of Mary, Lawler was a senior attending surgeon at Cook County Hospital in Chicago, a professor of surgery at the Cook County Graduate School of Medicine and an associate professor of surgery at his medical alma mater, Loyola University Chicago Stritch School of Medicine.

== Personal life ==
Lawler married in 1938 Charlotte "Andy" Anderson, a nurse he met at Little Company of Mary Hospital. The couple, who lived in the Beverly neighborhood of Chicago, had two daughters, Christine Lawler Nagle and Rosemary Lawler Wong, and four grandchildren.

Lawler died July 24, 1982, in Little Company of Mary, the hospital where he led the world's first kidney transplant. He was 86.
