= Frances Ann Hurley =

American politician

Member of the Illinois House of Representatives from the 35th district
- In office January 9, 2013 – February 28, 2023
- Preceded by: Bill Cunningham
- Succeeded by: Mary Gill

Personal details
- Party: Democratic
- Education: Saint Xavier University (BA)

Frances Ann Hurley is an American politician who served as a member of the Illinois House of Representatives for the 35th district from 2013 to 2023. The district included the Mount Greenwood neighborhood of Chicago along with all or part of Orland Park, Orland Hills, Palos Heights, Palos Park, Worth, Oak Lawn, Alsip, Merrionette Park and Evergreen Park. On February 17, 2023, Governor J. B. Pritzker announced his intention to appoint Hurley to the Illinois Labor Relations Board.

== Early life and career ==
Hurley graduated from Saint Xavier University with a Bachelor of Arts in political science. She was an aide to Alderwoman Virginia Rugai and Rugai's successor Alderman Matthew O'Shea. She also spent time in the Cook County Sheriff's Office as a Project Manager with an emphasis on officer wellness.

== Illinois House of Representatives ==
Hurley was elected to the Illinois House of Representatives in the 2012 general election. She succeeded Bill Cunningham who was elected to the Illinois Senate. Governor J. B. Pritzker submitted Hurley's name to the Illinois Senate for an appointment to the Illinois State Labor Relations Board for a term beginning March 1, 2023. On February 24, 2023, Hurley announced her resignation from the Illinois House of Representatives effective on February 28, 2023. The Democratic Representative Committee of the 35th District, chaired by Matthew O'Shea, appointed Mary Gill to the vacancy created by Hurley's resignation.

=== Committee assignments ===
Representative Hurley was a member of the following Illinois House committees:

- Cities & Villages Committee (HCIV)
- Elementary & Secondary Education: School Curriculum & Policies Committee (HELM)
- (Chairwoman of) Firefighters and First Responders Subcommittee (SHPF-FIRE)
- Labor & Commerce Committee (HLBR)
- (Chairwoman of) Law Enforcement Subcommittee (SHPF-LAWE)
- Natural Gas Subcommittee (HPUB-NGAS)
- (Chairwoman of) Police & Fire Committee (SHPF)
- Public Utilities Committee (HPUB)
- Small Business, Tech Innovation, and Entrepreneurship Committee (SBTE)
- Telecom/Video Subcommittee (HPUB-TVID)
- Transportation: Vehicles & Safety Committee (HVES)
- Wages Policy & Sturdy Subcommittee (HLBR-WAGE)

== Electoral history ==
Illinois' 35th representative district Democratic primary, 2012
Party	Candidate	Votes	%
Democratic	Frances Ann Hurley	6,782	53.49
Democratic	Anthony R. Martin	4,024	31.74
Democratic	Andrew Byrne Hodorowicz	1,872	14.77
Total votes		12,678	100.0

Illinois' 35th representative district general election, 2012
Party	Candidate	Votes	%
Democratic	Frances Ann Hurley	34,590	68.34
Republican	Ricardo A. Fernandez	16,022	31.66
Total votes		50,612	100.0

Illinois' 35th representative district general election, 2014
Party	Candidate	Votes	%
Democratic	Frances Ann Hurley (incumbent)	25,205	66.10
Republican	Victor C. Horne	12,927	33.90
Total votes		38,132	100.0

Illinois' 35th representative district general election, 2016
Party	Candidate	Votes	%
Democratic	Frances Ann Hurley (incumbent)	34,506	65.62
Republican	Victor Horne	18,081	34.38
Total votes		52,587	100.0

Illinois' 35th representative district general election, 2018
Party	Candidate	Votes	%
Democratic	Frances Ann Hurley (incumbent)	30,511	68.82
Republican	Herbert Hebein	13,821	31.18
Total votes		44,332	100.0
