= 119th Street station =

Commuter rail station in Blue Island, Illinois

119th Street Blue Island

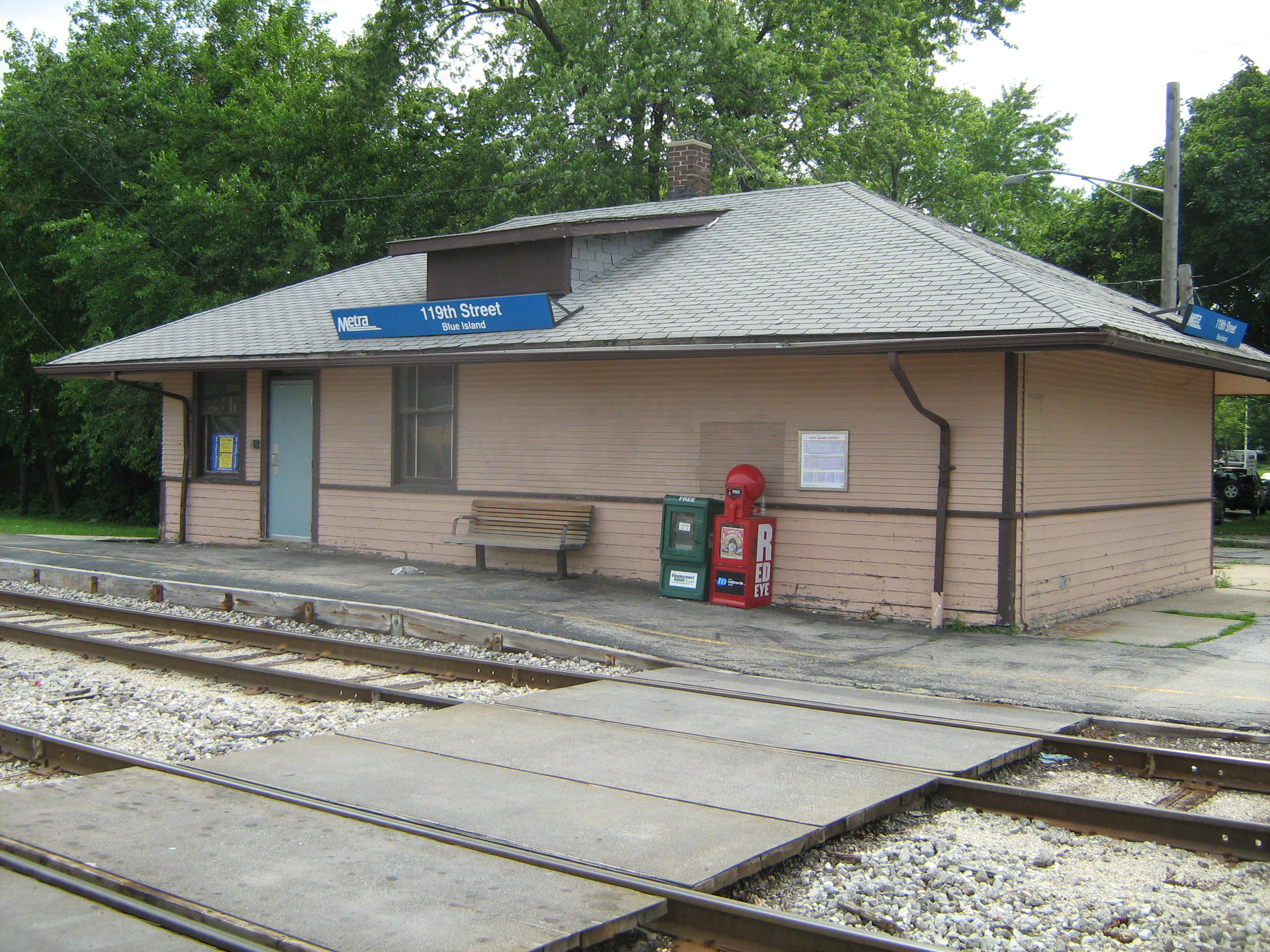

General information
- Location: 2040 West 119th Street; Blue Island, Illinois
- Coordinates: 41.6764°N 87.6726°W
- Owner: Metra
- Line: Beverly Subdistrict
- Platforms: 2 side platforms
- Tracks: 2

Construction
- Parking: Yes
- Accessible: Yes, partial (Note: At partially accessible stations, customers using mobility devices can access and use trains; however, the stations may not have other accessibility features such as accessible bathrooms, Braille signage, visual display announcements, etc.)

Other information
- Fare zone: 2

Passengers
- 2018: 269 (average weekday) ▼3.6%
- Rank: 150 out of 236

Services
Preceding station	Metra	Following station
123rd Street weekday limited toward Joliet	Rock Island Beverly Branch	115th Street/Morgan Park toward LaSalle
Former services
Preceding station	Chicago, Rock Island and Pacific Railroad	Following station
Blue Island 123rd Street toward Joliet	Suburban Service via Beverly	Morgan Park 115th Street toward Chicago
Track layout
Location

119th Street is one of four Metra railroad stations in Blue Island, Illinois along the Beverly Branch of the Rock Island District Line, and five within Blue Island generally. It is 14.8 miles (23.8 km) from LaSalle Street Station, the northern terminus of the line, and is named after 119th Street and located between 119th Street and 119th Place. In Metra's zone-based fare system, 119th Street is in zone 2. As of 2018, 119th Street is the 150th busiest of Metra's 236 non-downtown stations, with an average of 269 weekday boardings.

As of 2022, 119th Street is served by 40 trains (20 in each direction) on weekdays, by 21 trains (10 inbound, 11 outbound) on Saturdays, and by 16 trains (eight in each direction) on Sundays and holidays.

Parking is available on the west side of the tracks south of 119th Street in front of the station house, and on both sides of the tracks north of 119th Street. On the northwest side, parking is available off South Hale Avenue, and on the northeast side along Vincennes Avenue. South of the station, the tracks cross Vincennes Avenue.

== Bus connections ==
CTA

- 119 Michigan/119th
