= 95th Street/Beverly Hills station =

Commuter rail station in Chicago, Illinois

95th/Beverly Hills

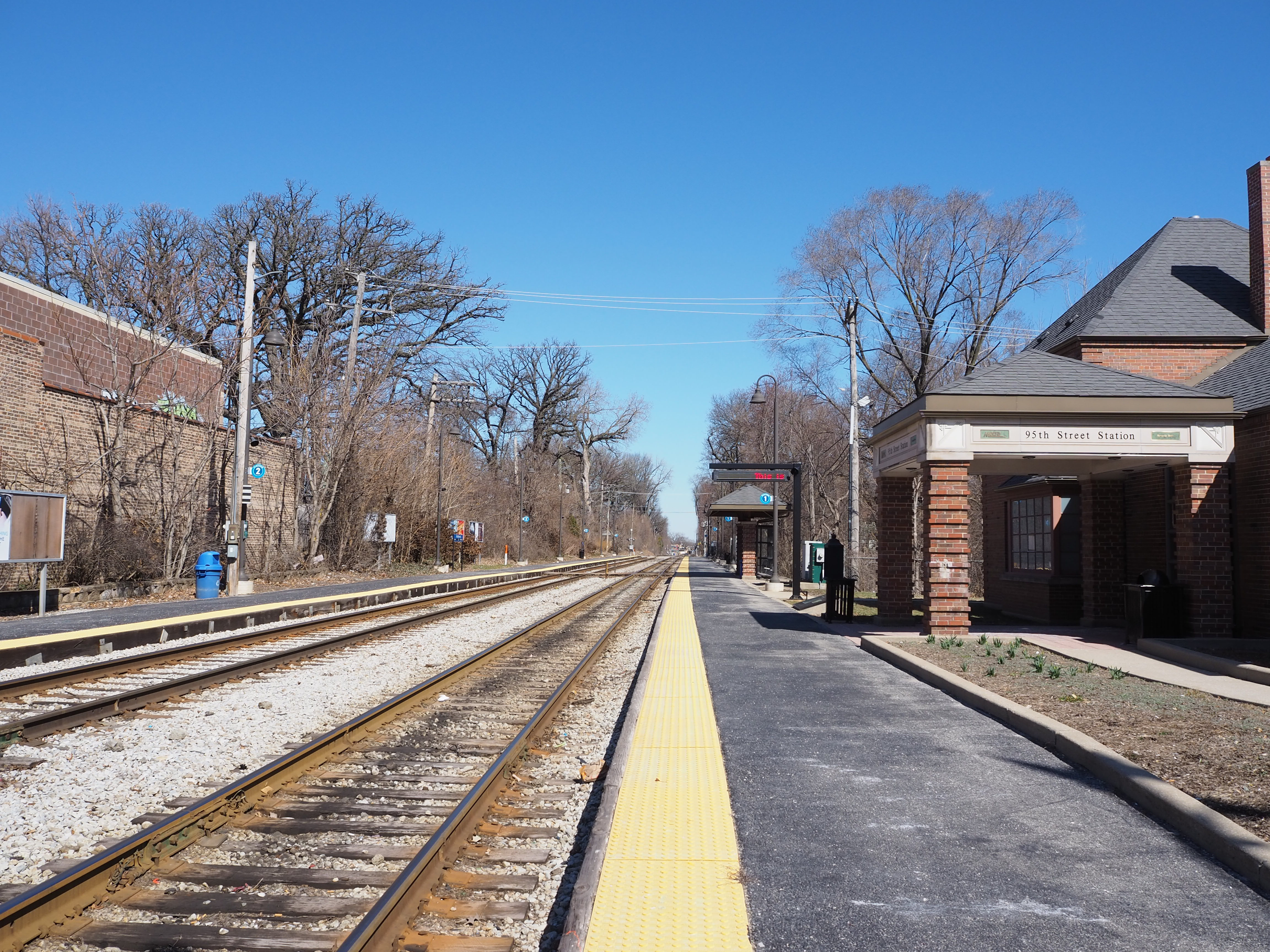

General information
- Location: 1766 West 95th Street; Beverly Hills, Chicago, Illinois 60643
- Coordinates: 41.7214°N 87.6673°W
- Owner: Metra
- Line: Beverly Subdistrict
- Platforms: 2 side platforms
- Tracks: 2
- Connections: CTA Bus; Pace Bus

Construction
- Parking: Yes
- Accessible: Yes

Other information
- Fare zone: 2

History
- Opened: 1945

Passengers
- 2018: 443 (average weekday) ▲4.7%
- Rank: 108 out of 236

Services
Preceding station	Metra	Following station
99th Street/Beverly Hills toward Joliet	Rock Island Beverly Branch	91st Street/Beverly Hills toward LaSalle
Former services
Preceding station	Chicago, Rock Island and Pacific Railroad	Following station
Beverly Hills 99th Street toward Joliet	Suburban Service via Beverly	Beverly Hills 91st Street toward Chicago
Track layout
Location

95th Street/Beverly Hills is one of five Metra stations within the Beverly neighborhood of Chicago, Illinois, along the Beverly Branch of the Rock Island District Line. The station is on 95th Street (US 12-20), 11.7 miles (18.8 km) from LaSalle Street Station, the northern terminus of the line. In Metra's zone-based fare system, 95th Street is in zone 2. As of 2018, 95th Street–Beverly Hills is the 108th busiest of Metra's 236 non-downtown stations, with an average of 443 weekday boardings.

As of 2022, 95th Street–Beverly Hills is served by 40 trains (20 in each direction) on weekdays, by 21 trains (10 inbound, 11 outbound) on Saturdays, and by 16 trains (eight in each direction) on Sundays and holidays.

Parking is available on the south side of 95th Street between the railroad tracks and Longwood Drive, and further west on the corner of 95th Street and Pleasant Avenue.

== Bus connections ==
CTA

- 95 95th

Pace

- 381 95th Street
- 395 95th/Dan Ryan CTA/UPS Hodgkins (weekday UPS shifts only)
