= Walter Burley Griffin Place District =

Coordinates: 41.7039°N 87.6646°W

The Walter Burley Griffin Place District is a historic district in Chicago, Illinois, United States. The district was built between 1909 and 1914. Seven of the homes were built by Walter Burley Griffin, one by Spencer and Powers, and the rest by various architects. It was designated a Chicago Landmark on November 13, 1981.
