= 103rd Street/Beverly Hills station =

Commuter rail station in Chicago, Illinois

103rd/Beverly Hills

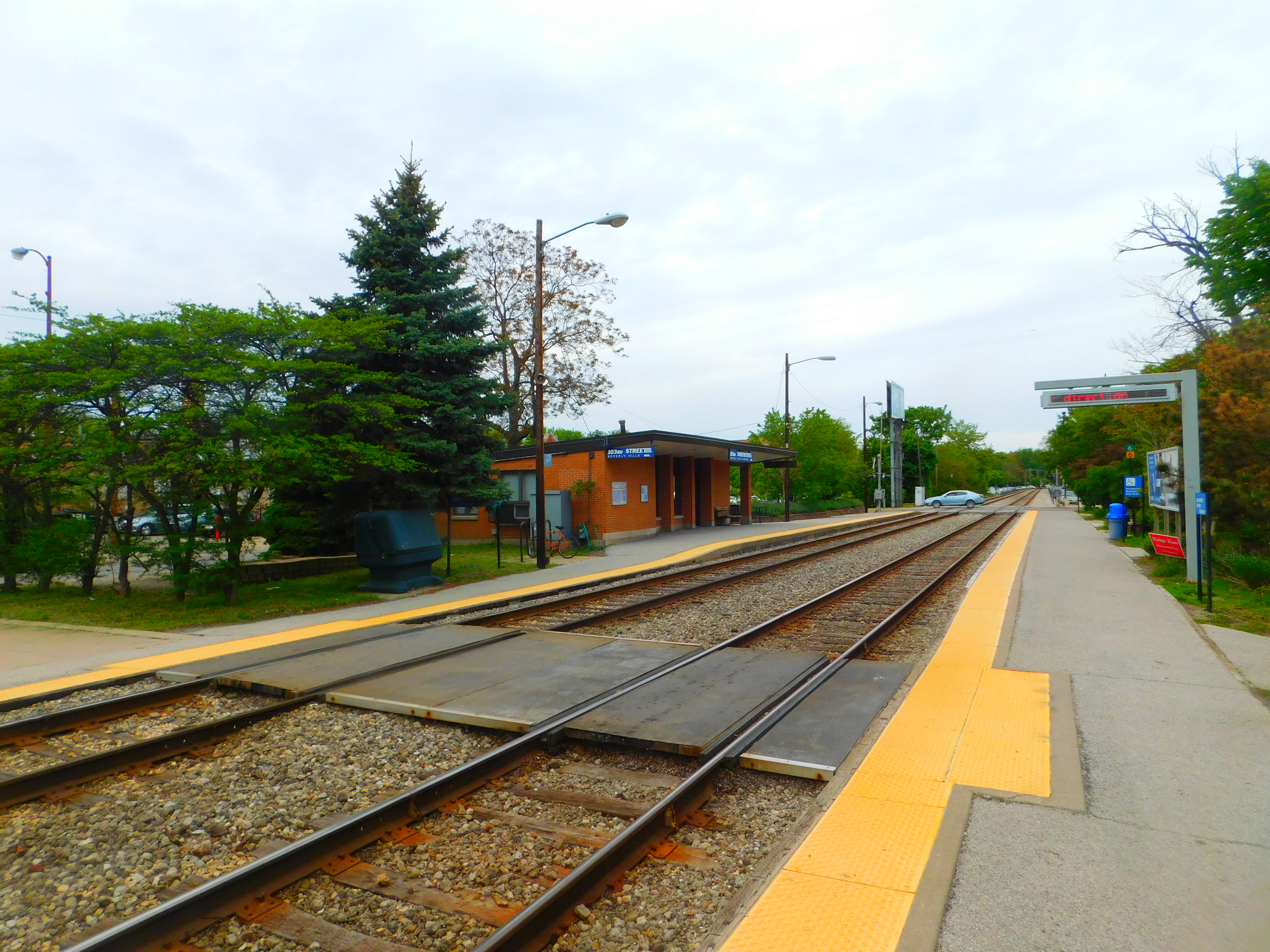
- 103rd Street/Beverly Hills station in May 2016

General information
- Location: 10301 South Walden Parkway; Beverly, Chicago, Illinois 60643
- Coordinates: 41.7065479°N 87.6690722°W
- Owner: Metra
- Line: Beverly Subdistrict
- Platforms: 2 side platforms
- Tracks: 2
- Connections: CTA Buses

Construction
- Parking: Yes
- Accessible: Yes

Other information
- Fare zone: 2

History
- Opened: 1892
- Rebuilt: 1950

Passengers
- 2018: 734 (average weekday) ▼3.3%
- Rank: 71 out of 236

Services
Preceding station	Metra	Following station
107th Street/Beverly Hills toward Joliet	Rock Island Beverly Branch	99th Street/Beverly Hills toward LaSalle
Former services
Preceding station	Chicago, Rock Island and Pacific Railroad	Following station
Beverly Hills 107th Street toward Joliet	Suburban Service via Beverly	Beverly Hills 99th Street toward Chicago
Track layout
Location

103rd Street/Beverly Hills is one of five Metra stations within the Beverly neighborhood of Chicago, Illinois, along the Beverly Branch of the Rock Island District Line. The station is located at 10301 South Walden Parkway on the corner of 103rd Street, 12.8 miles (20.6 km) from LaSalle Street Station, the northern terminus of the line. In Metra's zone-based fare system, 103rd Street is in zone 2. As of 2018, 103rd Street/Beverly Hills is the 71st busiest of Metra's 236 non-downtown stations, with an average of 734 weekday boardings.

As of 2022, 103rd Street/Beverly Hills is served by 40 trains (20 in each direction) on weekdays, by 21 trains (10 inbound, 11 outbound) on Saturdays, and by 16 trains (eight in each direction) on Sundays and holidays.

Parking is available along both side of the tracks between 101st Street and 105th Street. South Walden Parkway runs along the west side of the tracks and contains parking lots between the street and the tracks. Hale Avenue runs along the east side of the tracks and also contains parking lots between the street and tracks. Hale Avenue terminates at 103rd Street, but a parking lot runs further north from there to 101st Street.

== Bus connections ==
CTA

- 103 West 103rd
