= 91st Street/Beverly Hills station =

Commuter rail station in Chicago, Illinois

91st/Beverly Hills

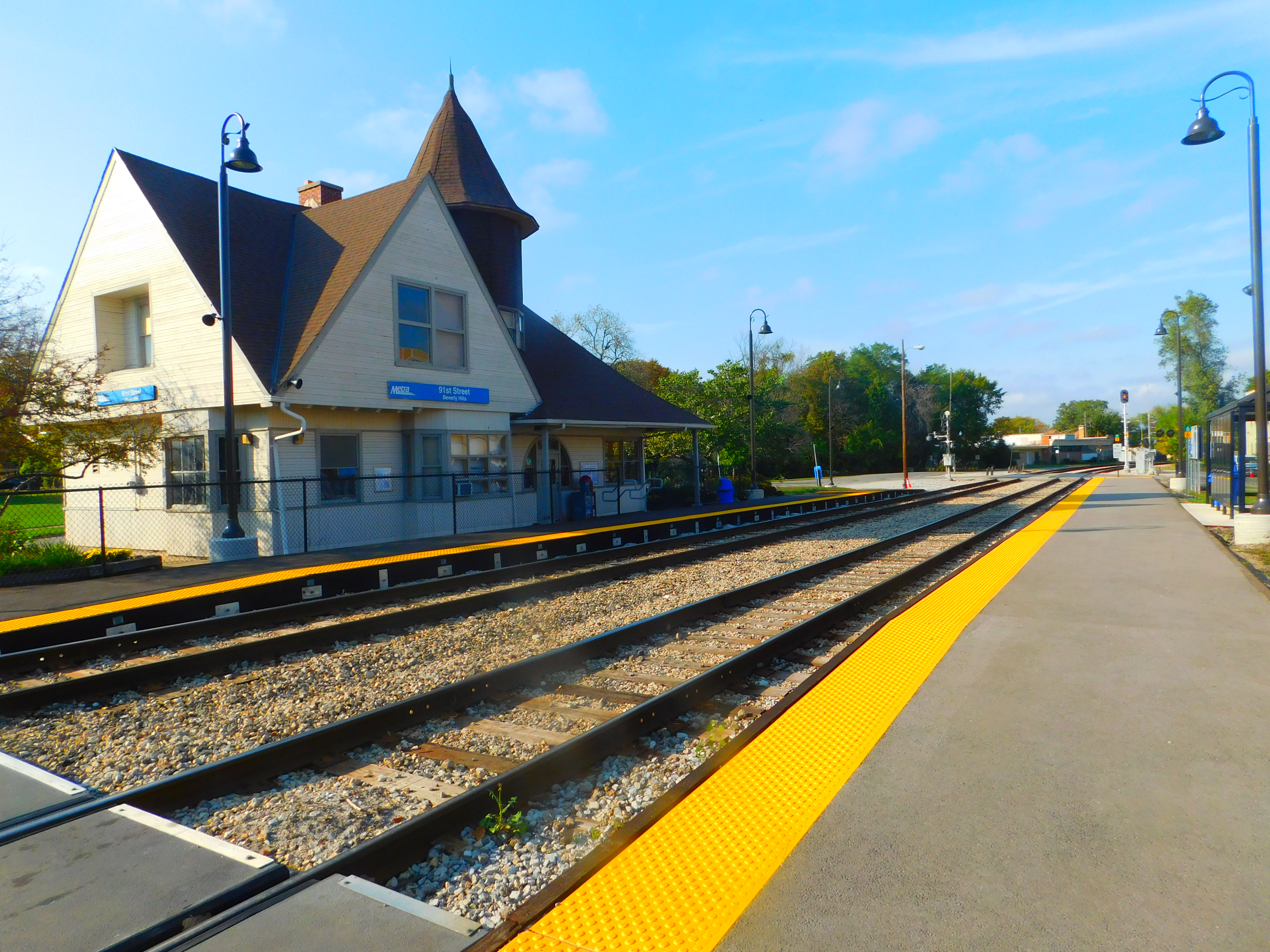
- 91st Street/Beverly Hills station in October 2015

General information
- Location: 9105 South Prospect Square; Beverly Hills, Chicago, Illinois 60620
- Coordinates: 41.7280°N 87.6673°W
- Owner: Metra
- Line: Beverly Subdistrict
- Platforms: 2 side platforms
- Tracks: 2

Construction
- Parking: Yes
- Accessible: Yes, partial (Note: At partially accessible stations, customers using mobility devices can access and use trains; however, the stations may not have other accessibility features such as accessible bathrooms, Braille signage, visual display announcements, etc.)

Other information
- Fare zone: 2

Passengers
- 2018: 368 (average weekday) ▲1.1%
- Rank: 128 out of 236

Services
Preceding station	Metra	Following station
95th Street/Beverly Hills toward Joliet	Rock Island Beverly Branch	Brainerd toward LaSalle
Former services
Preceding station	Chicago, Rock Island and Pacific Railroad	Following station
Beverly Hills 95th Street toward Joliet	Suburban Service via Beverly	Brainerd toward Chicago
Track layout
Location

91st Street/Beverly Hills is one of five Metra stations within the Beverly neighborhood of Chicago, Illinois, along the Beverly Branch of the Rock Island District Line. It is located at 9105 South Prospect Square near 91st Street, 11.3 miles (18.2 km) from LaSalle Street Station, the northern terminus of the line. In Metra's zone-based fare system, 91st Street is in zone 2. As of 2018, 91st Street–Beverly Hills is the 128th busiest of Metra's 236 non-downtown stations, with an average of 368 weekday boardings.

As of 2022, 91st Street–Beverly Hills is served by 40 trains (20 in each direction) on weekdays, by 21 trains (10 inbound, 11 outbound) on Saturdays, and by 16 trains (eight in each direction) on Sundays and holidays.

Despite the location and the name of the station, parking is not available along 91st Street nor Prospect Square. There is a parking lot north of the intersection with 91st and Prospect Square that includes an additional one for a Forest Preserve Maintenance Facility. The closest parking lots to the station house are on-street parking along Beverly Avenue and a parking lot along the west side of Beverly Avenue between the end of the on-street parking lots and north of 92nd Place. This lot is on the right of way of the former Pennsylvania Railroad "Panhandle Line" that shared the station. No bus connections are available.
