= 99th Street/Beverly Hills station =

Commuter rail station in Chicago, Illinois

99th/Beverly Hills

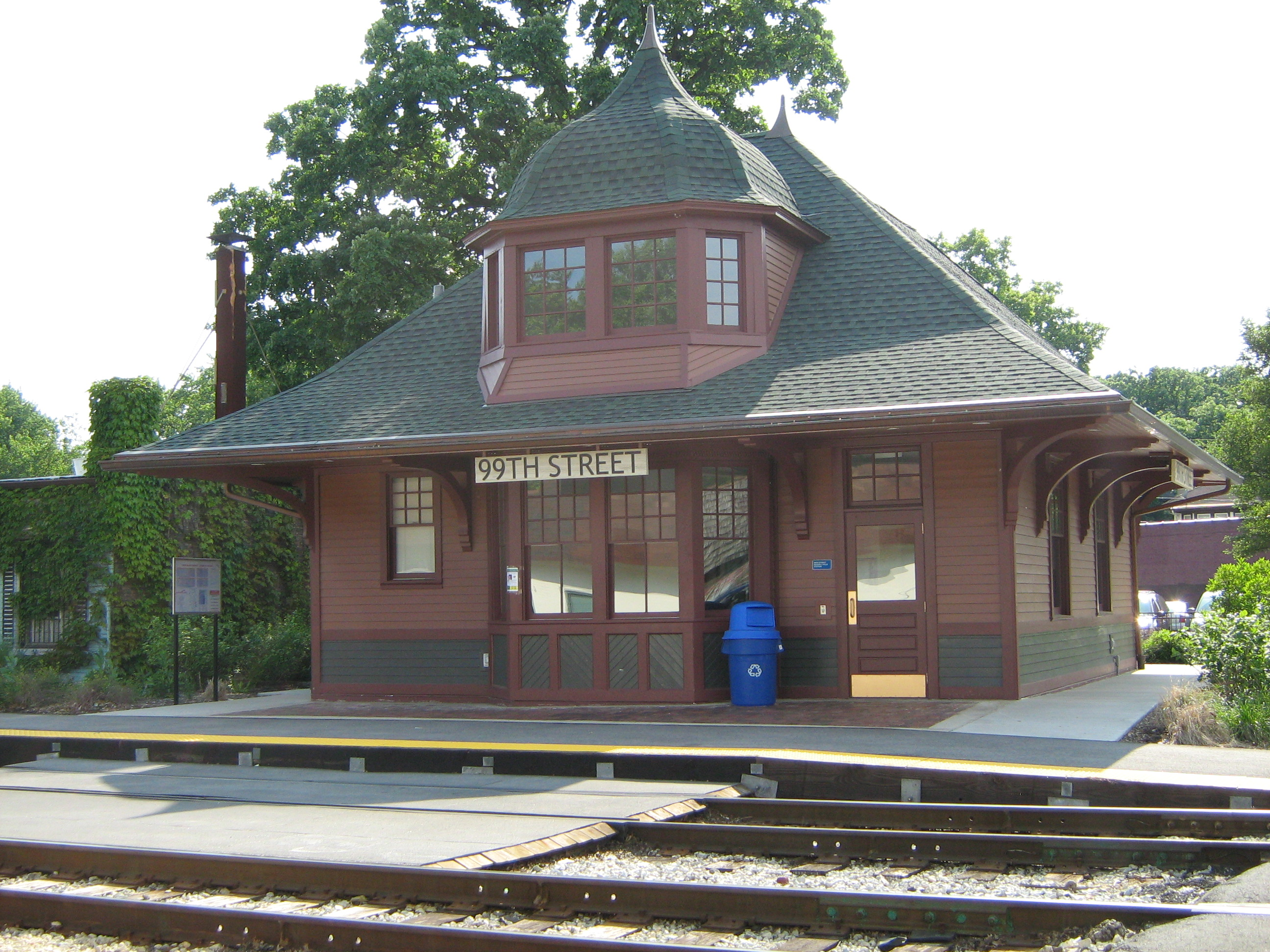

General information
- Location: 9901 South Walden Parkway; Beverly Hills, Chicago, Illinois 60643
- Coordinates: 41.7137°N 87.6674°W
- Owner: Metra
- Line: Beverly Subdistrict
- Platforms: 1 side platform
- Tracks: 2

Construction
- Parking: Yes
- Accessible: Yes

Other information
- Fare zone: 2

History
- Opened: 1945

Passengers
- 2018: 645 (average weekday) ▼11%
- Rank: 81 out of 236

Services
Preceding station	Metra	Following station
103rd Street/Beverly Hills toward Joliet	Rock Island Beverly Branch	95th Street/Beverly Hills toward LaSalle
Former services
Preceding station	Chicago, Rock Island and Pacific Railroad	Following station
Beverly Hills 103rd Street toward Joliet	Suburban Service via Beverly	Beverly Hills 95th Street toward Chicago
Track layout
Location

99th Street/Beverly Hills is one of five Metra stations within the Beverly neighborhood of Chicago, Illinois, along the Beverly Branch of the Rock Island District Line. The station is located at 9901 South Walden Parkway near 99th Street, 12.3 miles (19.8 km) from LaSalle Street Station, the northern terminus of the line. In Metra's zone-based fare system, 99th Street is in zone 2. As of 2018, 99th Street–Beverly Hills is the 81st busiest of Metra's 236 non-downtown stations, with an average of 645 weekday boardings.

As of 2022, 99th Street/Beverly Hills is served by 40 trains (20 in each direction) on weekdays, by 21 trains (10 inbound, 11 outbound) on Saturdays, and by 16 trains (eight in each direction) on Sundays and holidays.

Despite the name of the station, parking is not available along 99th Street. There are two long parking lots along the line between 100th Street and 101st Street, and two smaller parking lots north of 100th Street along both South Walden Parkway and Wood Street. No bus connections are available.
