= 107th Street/Beverly Hills station =

Commuter rail station in Chicago, Illinois

107th/Beverly Hills

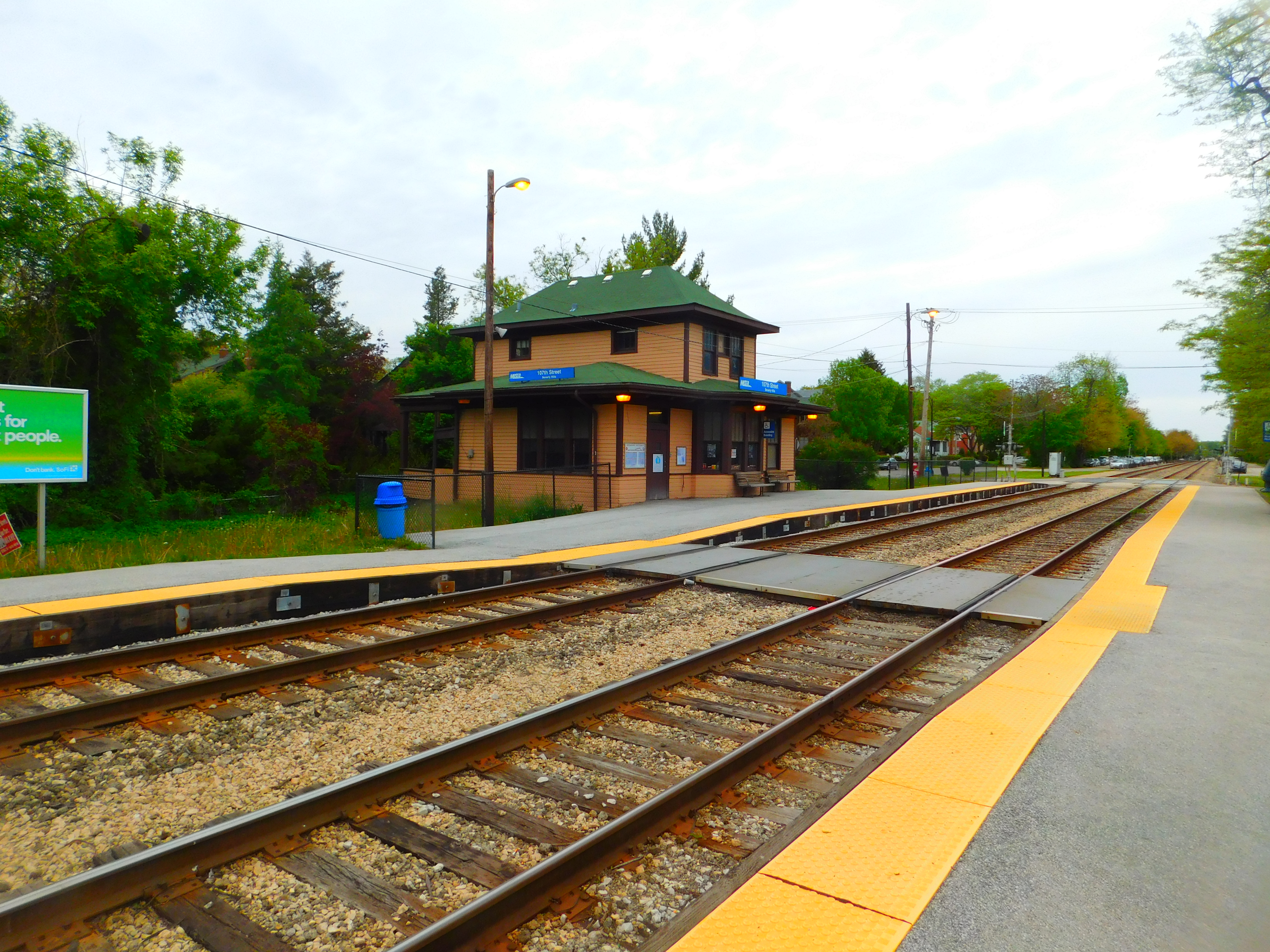
- 107th Street/Beverly Hills station in May 2016

General information
- Location: 1901 West 107th Street; Beverly Hills, Chicago, Illinois 60643
- Coordinates: 41.6992564°N 87.6696376°W
- Owner: Metra
- Line: Beverly Subdistrict
- Platforms: 2 side platforms
- Tracks: 2

Construction
- Parking: Yes: Vending
- Accessible: Yes, partial (Note: At partially accessible stations, customers using mobility devices can access and use trains; however, the stations may not have other accessibility features such as accessible bathrooms, Braille signage, visual display announcements, etc.)

Other information
- Fare zone: 2

History
- Opened: 1892

Passengers
- 2018: 395 (average weekday) ▼12.4%
- Rank: 121 out of 236

Services
Preceding station	Metra	Following station
111th Street/Morgan Park toward Joliet	Rock Island Beverly Branch	103rd Street/Beverly Hills toward LaSalle
Former services
Preceding station	Chicago, Rock Island and Pacific Railroad	Following station
Morgan Park 111th Street toward Joliet	Suburban Service via Beverly	Beverly Hills 103rd Street toward Chicago
Track layout
Location

107th Street/Beverly Hills is one of five Metra stations within the Beverly neighborhood of Chicago, Illinois, along the Beverly Branch of the Rock Island District Line. The station is located at 1901 West 107th Street opposite the intersection of South Walden Parkway, 13.3 miles (21.4 km) from LaSalle Street Station, the northern terminus of the line. In Metra's zone-based fare system, 107th Street is in zone 2. As of 2018, 107th Street/Beverly Hills is the 121st busiest of Metra's 236 non-downtown stations, with an average of 395 weekday boardings.

As of 2022, 107th Street/Beverly Hills is served by 40 trains (20 in each direction) on weekdays, by 21 trains (10 inbound, 11 outbound) on Saturdays, and by 16 trains (eight in each direction) on Sundays and holidays.

107th Street Station contains its original station house, but is unstaffed. Parking is available along both side of the tracks between 105th Street and 108th Street. South Walden Parkway runs along the west side of the tracks and contains parking lots between the street and the tracks. Although this street terminates at 107th Street, the parking lot continues to 108th Street. On the east side of the tracks, a parking lot runs north from 108th Street behind the west side of Hale Avenue. Between 107th and 105th Streets, another parking lot runs directly between Hale Avenue and the tracks. No bus connections are available.
