= 115th Street/Morgan Park station =

Commuter rail station in Chicago, Illinois

115th/Morgan Park

- Station platforms in October 2026, with the new station shelter (left) and station house (right) being built

General information
- Location: 1982 West 115th Street; Morgan Park, Chicago, Illinois 60643
- Coordinates: 41.684803°N 87.671456°W
- Owner: Metra
- Line: Beverly Subdistrict
- Platforms: 2 side platforms
- Tracks: 2

Construction
- Parking: Yes; vendors
- Accessible: Yes, partial (Note: At partially accessible stations, customers using mobility devices can access and use trains; however, the stations may not have other accessibility features such as accessible bathrooms, Braille signage, visual display announcements, etc.)

Other information
- Fare zone: 2

History
- Opened: 1892

Passengers
- 2018: 136 (average weekday) ▼20%
- Rank: 176 out of 236

Services
| Preceding station | Metra | Following station |
|---|---|---|
| 119th Street toward Joliet | Rock Island Beverly Branch | 111th Street/Morgan Park toward LaSalle |
Former services
| Preceding station | Chicago, Rock Island and Pacific Railroad | Following station |
|---|---|---|
| Blue Island 119th Street toward Joliet | Suburban Service via Beverly | Morgan Park 111th Street toward Chicago |
Track layout
Location

115th Street/Morgan Park is one of two Metra railroad stations in the Morgan Park neighborhood of Chicago, Illinois, along the Beverly Branch of the Rock Island District Line. It is 14.3 miles (23.0 km) from LaSalle Street Station, the northern terminus of the line. In Metra's zone-based fare system, 115th Street is in zone 2. As of 2018, 115th Street/Morgan Park was the 176th busiest of Metra's 236 non-downtown stations, with an average of 136 weekday boardings.

As of 2022, 115th Street/Morgan Park is served by 40 trains (20 in each direction) on weekdays, by 21 trains (10 inbound, 11 outbound) on Saturdays, and by 16 trains (eight in each direction) on Sundays and holidays.

Parking is available along the west side of the tracks on South Hale Avenue between Edmaire Street and north of 116th Street. It is also available on small on-street lots along the north side of 115th Street between the tracks and Church Street. No bus connections are available.

== History ==
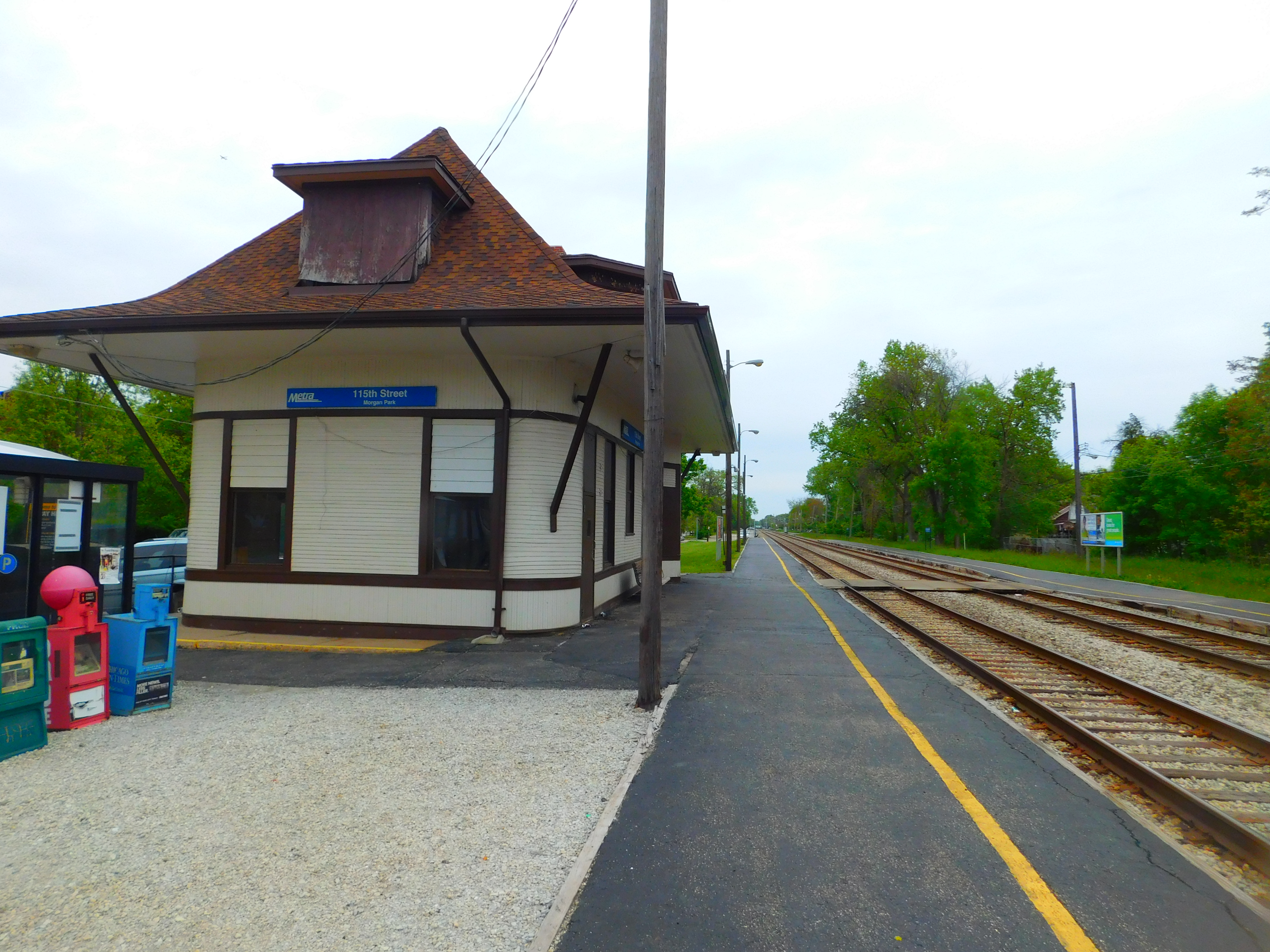
Station in May 2016, before the depot burned

The train station building was damaged by a fire in May 2017 and subsequently demolished. Officials ruled that arson was the cause of the fire. On February 19, 2025, IHC Construction Companies received $8.69 million for station renovation, which includes adding a new station house in place of the now-demolished structure. A groundbreaking ceremony occurred on June 16, 2025.
