= Matthew O'Shea =

American politician

Matthew J. O'Shea

Member of the Chicago City Council from the 19th Ward
- Incumbent
- Assumed office May 16, 2011
- Preceded by: Virginia Rugai

Personal details
- Born: August 26, 1969 (age 57)
- Party: Democratic
- Education: Saint Mary's University of Minnesota (BA)
- Website: Official website

Matthew J. O'Shea is an American politician who has served as the alderman for the 19th Ward of the Chicago City Council since 2011. The 19th Ward is located on the southwest side of Chicago and includes the neighborhoods of Beverly, Morgan Park and Mount Greenwood.

== Early life and education, and career ==
O'Shea is a lifelong resident of the 19th Ward.

O'Shea attended Christ the King Elementary School, Mount Carmel High School and Moraine Valley Community College. He earned a bachelor’s degree from Saint Mary's University of Minnesota.

In his career, O'Shea worked as a social worker and director of a community center. He also served as an aide to Alderman Virginia Rugai and Cook County Sheriff Mike Sheahan.

O'Shea serves on several boards, including the Chicago Police Memorial Foundation, Special Children’s Charities, John McNicholas Pediatric Brain Tumor Foundation and Misericordia Home.

== Political career ==
O'Shea was first elected Alderman of the 19th Ward in 2011. He has been reelected in 2015, 2019 and 2023.

He was supportive of Rahm Emanuel as Mayor of Chicago, and has worked with the Chicago Police Department to make public safety a top priority for his community.

Among the committees O'Shea has served on are Aviation, Budget and Government Operations, Committees and Rules, Economic, Capital and Technology Development, Education and Child Development, Ethics and Government Oversight, Finance, Health and Human Relations, License and Consumer Protection,, Public Safety, Special Events, Cultural Affairs, and Recreation, Transportation and Public Way and Zoning, Landmarks and Building Standards

In June 2018, Chicago Mayor Rahm Emanuel appointed O'Shea as the chairman of the Chicago Committee on Aviation.

In the 2019 Chicago mayoral election, O'Shea endorsed Jerry Joyce in the first round of the election and endorsed Lori Lightfoot in the runoff. His endorsement of Lightfoot has been credited with securing her strong support in his ward in the runoff vote.

O’Shea was an elected delegate to the 2004 Democratic National Convention. He has served as the Democratic Committeeman of the 19th Ward since 2005.

== See also ==
- List of Chicago alderpersons since 1923
