= 111th Street/Morgan Park station =

Commuter rail station in Chicago, Illinois

111th/Morgan Park

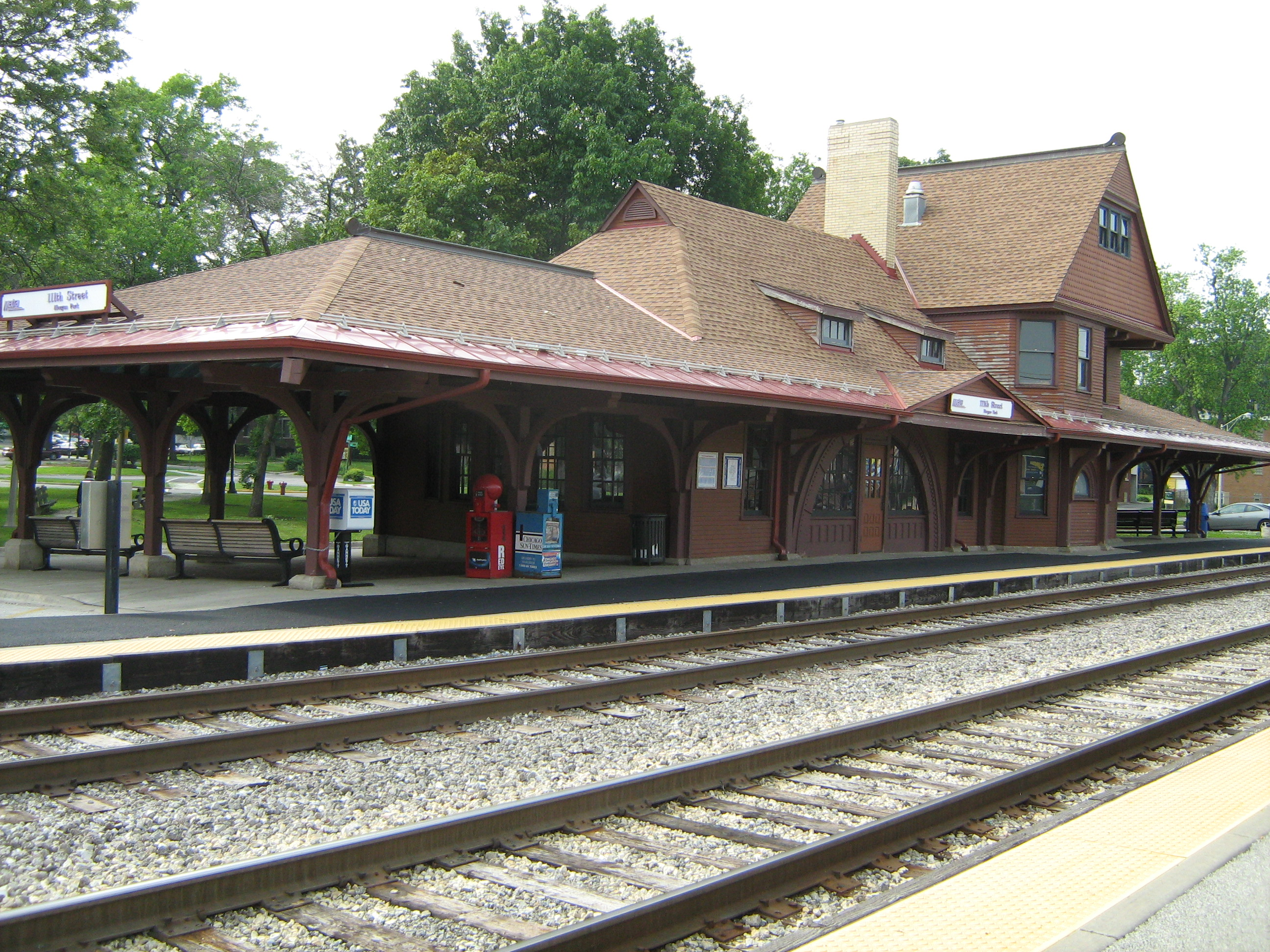

General information
- Location: 11046 South Hale Avenue; Morgan Park, Chicago, Illinois 60643
- Coordinates: 41.6927283°N 87.6704024°W
- Owner: Metra
- Line: Beverly Subdistrict
- Platforms: 2 side platforms
- Tracks: 2
- Connections: CTA Buses

Construction
- Parking: Yes; Vending
- Cycle facilities: Yes; Bicycle racks
- Accessible: Yes

Other information
- Fare zone: 2

History
- Opened: 1892

Passengers
- 2018: 548 (average weekday) ▼6.6%
- Rank: 92 out of 236

Services
| Preceding station | Metra | Following station |
|---|---|---|
| 115th Street/Morgan Park toward Joliet | Rock Island Beverly Branch | 107th Street/Beverly Hills toward LaSalle |
Former services
| Preceding station | Chicago, Rock Island and Pacific Railroad | Following station |
|---|---|---|
| Morgan Park 115th Street toward Joliet | Suburban Service via Beverly | Beverly Hills 107th Street toward Chicago |
Track layout
Location

111th Street/Morgan Park is one of two Metra railroad stations in the Morgan Park neighborhood of Chicago, Illinois, along the Beverly Branch of the Rock Island District Line, 13.8 miles (22.2 km) from LaSalle Street Station, the northern terminus of the line. The station is named after 111th Street, although its address is 11046 South Hale Avenue between Monterey and Prospect Avenues; 111th Street runs in line with Monterey Avenue east of Morgan Park. In Metra's zone-based fare system, 111th Street is in zone 2. As of 2018, 111th Street/Morgan Park is the 92nd busiest of Metra's 236 non-downtown stations, with an average of 548 weekday boardings.

As of 2022, 111th Street/Morgan Park is served by 40 trains (20 in each direction) on weekdays, by 21 trains (10 inbound, 11 outbound) on Saturdays, and by 16 trains (eight in each direction) on Sundays and holidays.

Parking is available on both sides of the tracks along South Hale Avenue between 108th Place and Edmaire Street. It is also available on Homewood and Monterery Avenues behind South Hale Avenue, and at Prospect Park on Prospect Avenue and the northwest corner of Pryor and Homewood Avenues.

== Bus connections ==
CTA

- 112 Vincennes/111th
