= Ashland Avenue =

Street in Chicago

- 1600 West
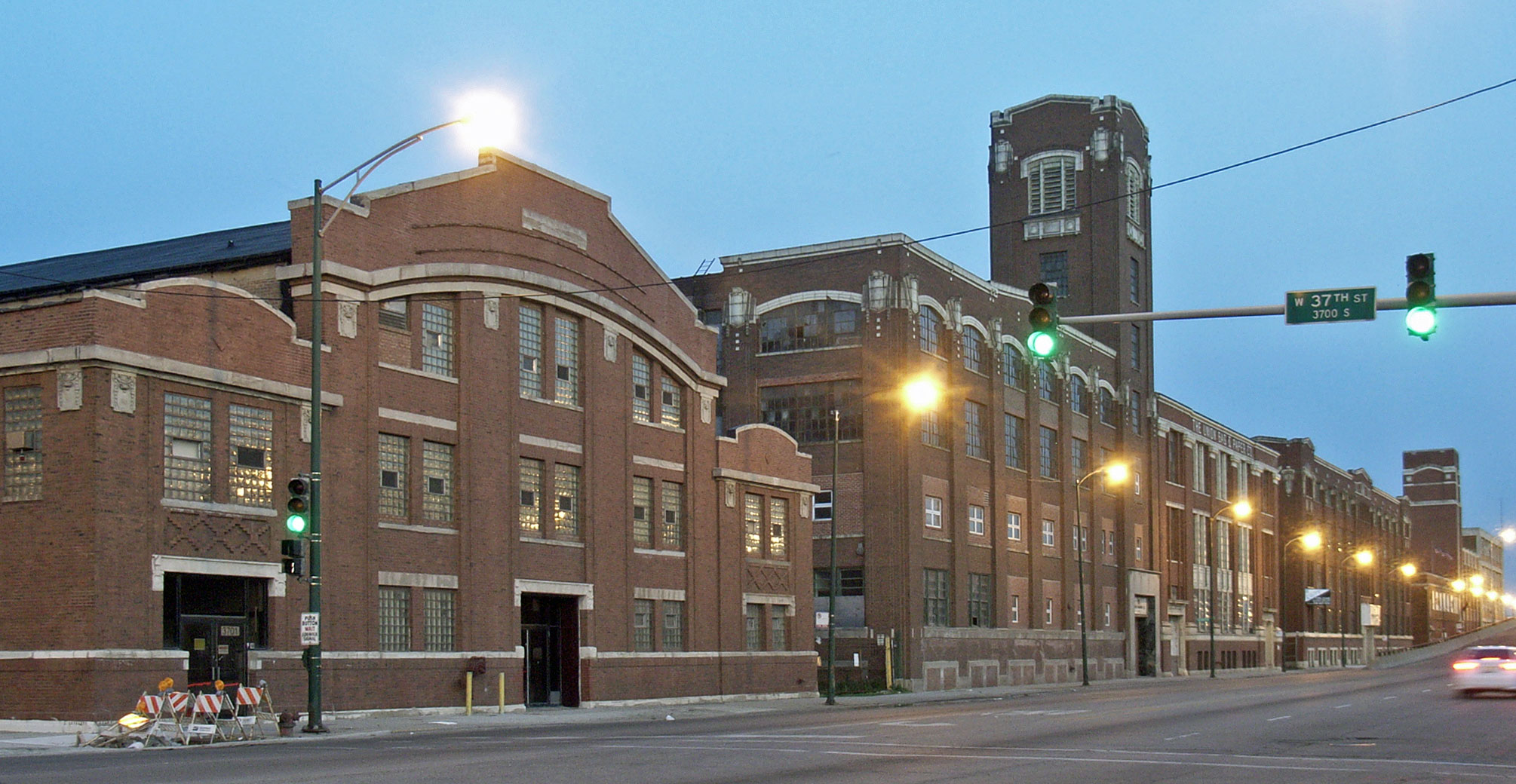
- Buildings of the Central Manufacturing District at Ashland and 37th Street (2008)
- Location: Park Forest, Olympia Fields, Dixmoor, Blue Island, Chicago, Evanston
- South end: County Line Road west of Sollitt
- Major junctions: US 30 in Chicago Heights; US 6 in Harvey; IL 83 in Harvey; US 12 / US 20 in Chicago; I-55 in Chicago; I-290 in Chicago; IL 64 in Chicago; in Chicago; IL 19 in Chicago; US 41 in Chicago
- North end: Juneway Terrace in Chicago

Ashland Avenue is a north-south street in Chicago, in whose grid system it is designated as 1600W. It is 2 miles (3.2 km) west of State Street, the city's north-south baseline. It is one of the major streets connecting the north and south sides.

== Transportation ==
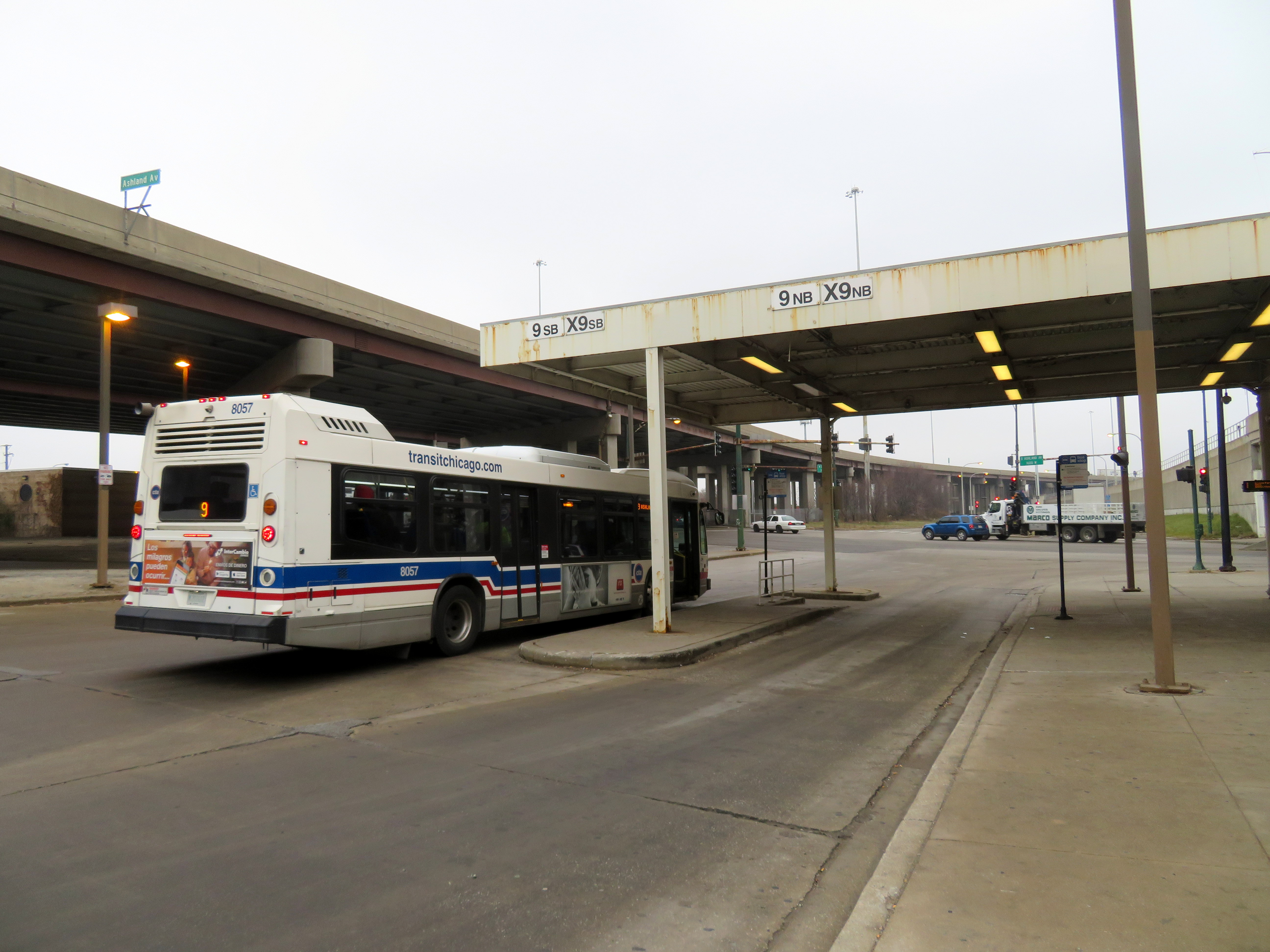
CTA route 9 bus at Ashland (Orange Line) station

On the Chicago "L", Ashland is served by two stations on the Green Line, one on the Lake Street Elevated and the other on the Englewood branch; the Lake Street station is also served by the Pink Line. The Orange Line also has a station serving Ashland Avenue. Ashland is also served by the Blue Line at the Division and Illinois Medical District stations, the Red Line at Jarvis station, and the Brown Line at Paulina station; Both the Illinois Medical District and Paulina stations are located one block west of Ashland. On the Metra, Ashland is served by the Union Pacific North and Northwest Lines at Clybourn, the Rock Island Suburban Service at Brainerd, and the Metra Electric Blue Island Branch at Ashland/Calumet Park.

Ashland Avenue is primarily served by two bus routes: 9 Ashland and X9 Ashland Express. CTA bus route 9 runs from Ravenswood station on Metra's Union Pacific North Line to a bus turnaround just south of 95th Street. Some weekday buses continue south via Beverly Boulevard toward 104th Street at Vincennes Avenue near a Rock Island District Metra station. Bus route X9 operates as an express service, running from Irving Park Road at Sheridan Road near a Red Line station toward the same bus turnaround at 95th Street.

=== History ===
In the late 19th century, a streetcar ran on Ashland Avenue from 22nd Street up to Roosevelt Street, where it turned west to run north from Paulina Avenue to avoid running on a boulevard, returning to Ashland Avenue via Lake Street. This was extended south to Archer Avenue in 1896, and on September 4, 1908, was extended to connect with another route south to 70th Street. Simultaneous with the 70th Street extension was a northward one to Southport Street via Clybourn Avenue, which was further extended to Clark Street on October 16, 1912. Further extensions, including the absorption of a shuttle route, created a crosstown through-route from Clark Street down to 87th Street starting November 1, 1916. This became known as "Through Route 9" (TR 9) in 1924. By the early- to mid-20th century, Ashland was one of the "Big Five" streetcar lines, which had the highest ridership, got the most amentities and had the shortest wait times. As of 1928, TR 9 had owl service between 1 and 4:45 a.m., wherein streetcars ran every fifteen minutes; during the day, streetcar lines in Chicago typically had intervals of between eight and fifteen minutes per car. Buses replaced streetcars on weekends starting May 11, 1952, and altogether on February 13, 1954.

In 2013, the CTA proposed a bus rapid transit line along Ashland Avenue from 95th Street to Irving Park Road. However, opposition led to the proposal being stalled. In 2015, the X9 express bus route along Ashland Avenue was restored after the said route was discontinued five years prior in 2010. On September 3, 2024, the northern terminus of bus route 9 was relocated from Clark Street at the Graceland Cemetery to Metra's Ravenswood station.

== In popular culture ==
Ashland Avenue is a stage play written by Lee Kirk, and set in the Chicago area. Its first performance in Chicago's Goodman Theatre is directed by Susan V. Booth and stars Jenna Fischer.

== Works cited ==
- Lind, Alan R. (1974). Chicago Surface Lines: An Illustrated History. Park Forest, Illinois: Transport History Press.
- Weller, Peter (1999). The Living Legacy of the Chicago Aurora and Elgin. San Francisco: Forum Press. ISBN 0-945213-41-7 – via Internet Archive.
