= 35th Street station =

Commuter rail station in Chicago, Illinois

35th/Lou Jones

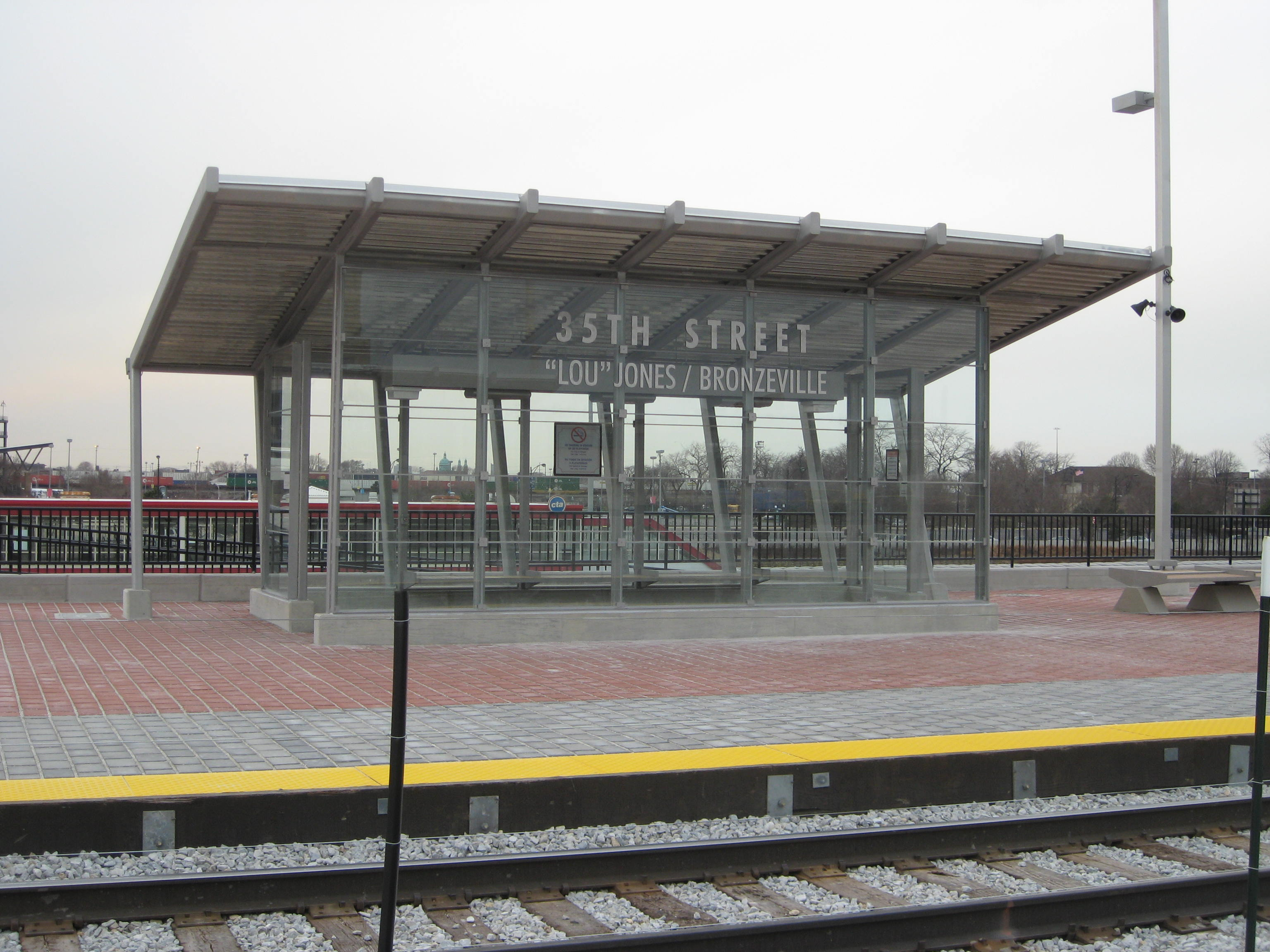

General information
- Location: 106 West 35th Street; Bronzeville, Chicago, Illinois 60616
- Coordinates: 41°49′53″N 87°37′46″W
- Owner: Metra
- Line: Joliet Subdistrict
- Platforms: 2 side platforms
- Tracks: 2 tracks
- Connections: Chicago "L": Red at Sox–35th; Green at 35th–Bronzeville–IIT

Construction
- Parking: Yes
- Cycle facilities: Yes
- Accessible: Yes

Other information
- Fare zone: 2

History
- Opened: April 3, 2011

Passengers
- 2018: 245 (average weekday) ▲7.9%
- Rank: 158 out of 236

Services
| Preceding station | Metra | Following station |
|---|---|---|
| Gresham toward Joliet | Rock Island | LaSalle Terminus |
Future services
| Preceding station | Metra | Following station |
|---|---|---|
| Auburn Park Under construction toward Joliet | Rock Island | LaSalle Terminus |
| Wrightwood toward Manhattan | SouthWest Service | LaSalle Terminus |
Track layout
Location

35th Street/Lou Jones/Bronzeville, also known simply as 35th Street, is a station on Metra's Rock Island District line. It is located in the Bronzeville neighborhood on the South Side of Chicago, Illinois. It was named in honor of Lovana Jones who was an Illinois State Representative in the Bronzeville neighborhood.

Metra began construction on the new station in 2009 and it opened on April 3, 2011, after originally being scheduled to open in late 2010. It is located east of Rate Field, home of the Chicago White Sox, and also serves the nearby Illinois Institute of Technology, Chicago Police Headquarters, and De La Salle Institute.

Currently, it is the third newest station on the Metra system after Peterson/Ridge station which opened on May 20, 2024 and Romeoville station which opened on February 5, 2018.

The station is also located roughly 200 feet (61 m) from CTA's Sox–35th station on the Red Line, in the median of the Dan Ryan Expressway. It is also located within walking distance of the CTA's 35th–Bronzeville–IIT station on the Green Line.

It is about 3.1 miles (5.0 km) from LaSalle Street Station, the northern terminus of the Rock Island District, and consists of two side platforms with heated shelters that serve two tracks. As of 2018, 35th Street is the 158th busiest of Metra's 236 non-downtown stations, with an average of 245 weekday boardings.

As of 2022, 35th Street is served by 74 trains (37 in each direction) on weekdays, by all 33 trains (16 inbound, 17 outbound) on Saturdays, and by all 28 trains (14 in each direction) on Sundays and holidays.

In the future, 35th Street station will receive trains from the SouthWest Service as part of a planned reroute of that line from Union Station to LaSalle Street Station as well as (non-stopping) Amtrak services rerouted from the Heritage Corridor. These service changes will be accompanied by the construction of a third track through the station.

== Bus connections ==
CTA

- 24 Wentworth
- 31 31st
- 35 31st/35th
- 39 Pershing

Pace

- 773 Markham/Tinley Park-Rate Field Express
- 774 Palos Heights/Oak Lawn-Rate Field Express
- 775 Bolingbrook/Burr Ridge-Rate Field Express
