= 95th Street/Longwood station =

Commuter rail station in Chicago, Illinois

95th Street/Longwood

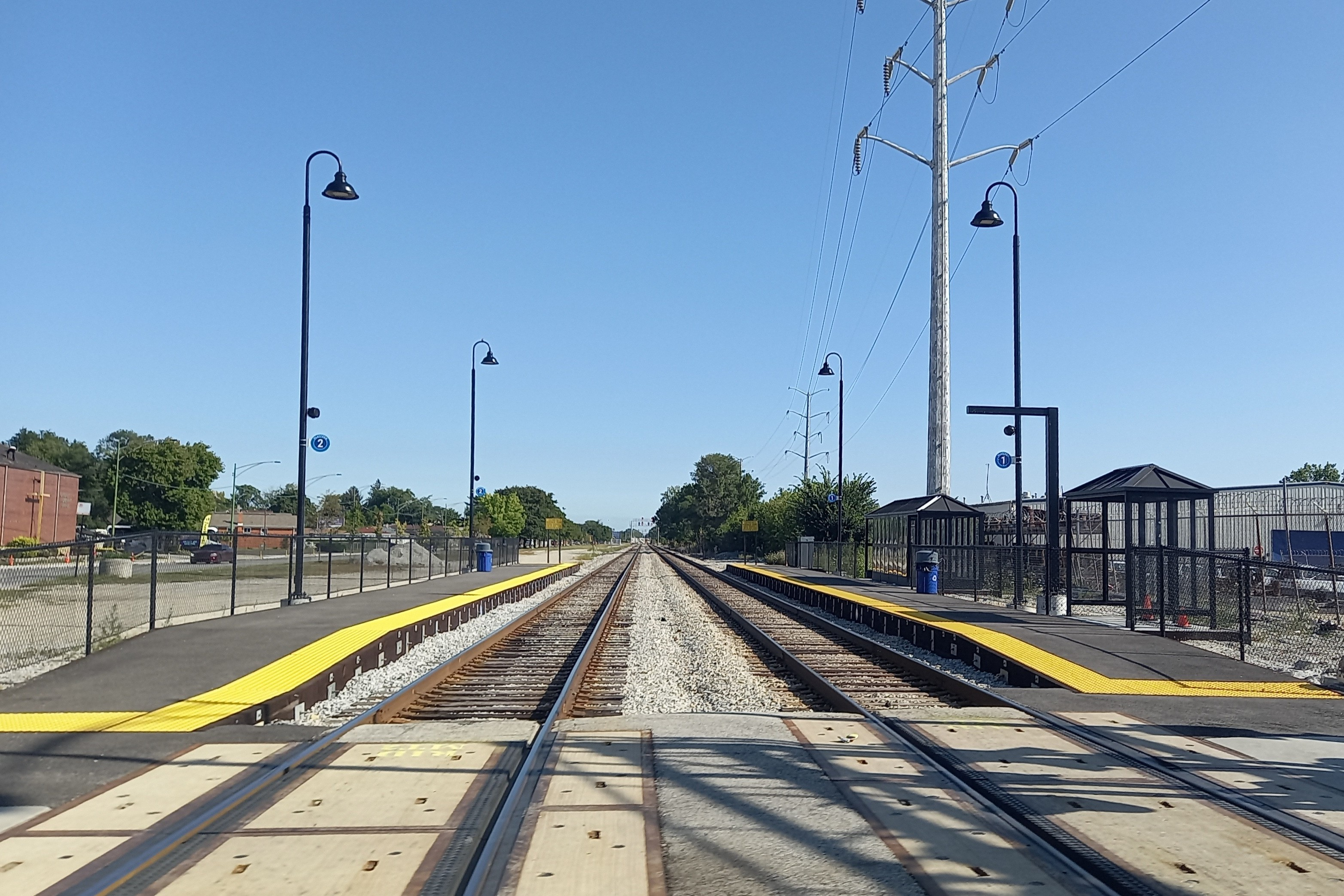

General information
- Location: 9501 South Vincennes Avenue; Longwood Manor, Chicago, Illinois 60643
- Coordinates: 41.7211°N 87.6503°W
- Line: Joliet Subdistrict
- Platforms: 2 side platforms
- Tracks: 2
- Connections: CTA Bus; Pace Bus

Construction
- Structure type: Plexiglass Open Shelter
- Parking: Yes
- Accessible: Yes, partial (Note: At partially accessible stations, customers using mobility devices can access and use trains; however, the stations may not have other accessibility features such as accessible bathrooms, Braille signage, visual display announcements, etc.)

Other information
- Fare zone: 2

Passengers
- 2018: 64 (average weekday) ▲6.7%
- Rank: 204 out of 236

Services
Preceding station	Metra	Following station
103rd Street/Washington Heights toward Joliet	Rock Island	Gresham toward LaSalle
Former services
Preceding station	Metra	Following station
99th Street–Longwood closed 1985 toward Joliet	Rock Island Rush hour only	Gresham toward LaSalle
Preceding station	Chicago, Rock Island and Pacific Railroad	Following station
Longwood Manor 99th Street toward Joliet	Suburban Service via Main Line	Gresham toward Chicago
Track layout
Location

95th Street/Longwood station is a commuter railroad station on Metra's Rock Island District line in the Longwood Manor neighborhood of the Washington Heights section of Chicago, Illinois, at 9501 South Vincennes Avenue at the corner of 95th Street (US 12-20). It is 10.9 miles (17.5 km) from LaSalle Street Station, the northern terminus of the line. In Metra's zone-based fare system, Longwood Manor is in zone 2. As of 2018, 95th Street–Longwood Manor is the 204th busiest of Metra's 236 non-downtown stations, with an average of 64 weekday boardings.

As of 2022, 95th–Longwood Manor is served by 17 trains (eight inbound, nine outbound) on weekdays. It is served during peak hours only, although it does get served by some reverse peak trains.

The station is little more than an open acrylic glass shelter and is used only during rush hours. Regular service with more frequent trains is at 95th Street/Beverly Hills station on the Suburban Branch west of this station. Parking is available south of 95th Street along Vincennes Avenue, and east of the station along Genoa Avenue, also off of 95th Street.

== Bus connections ==
CTA

- N9 Ashland
- 95 95th
- 112 Vincennes/111th

Pace

- 381 95th Street
- 395 95th/Dan Ryan CTA/UPS Hodgkins (weekday UPS shifts only)
