= Sox–35th station =

Chicago "L" station

Sox-35th 3500S 200W
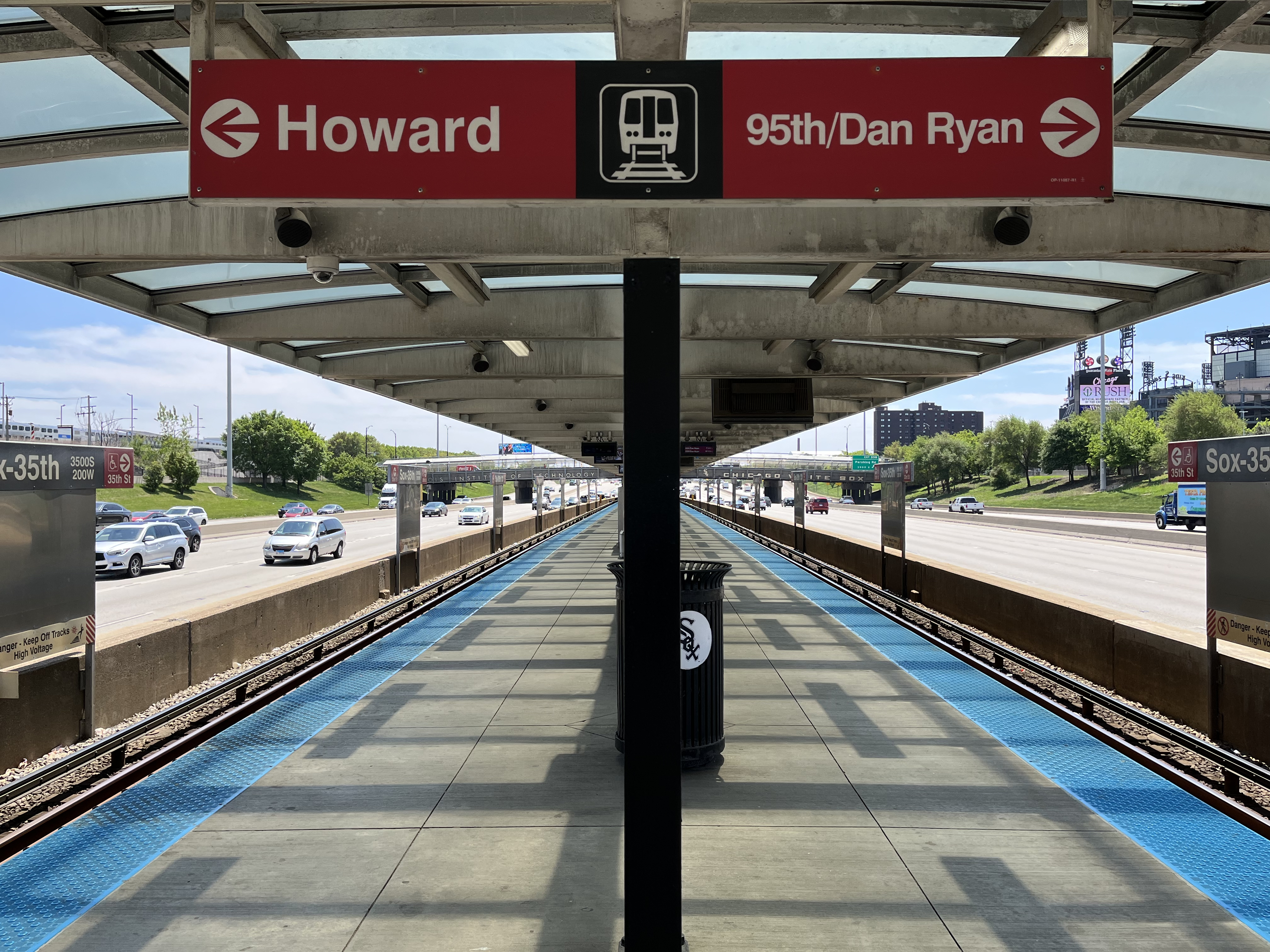
- The station in 2023

General information
- Location: 142 West 35th Street; Chicago, Illinois 60616
- Coordinates: 41.831191°N 87.630636°W
- Owner: Chicago Transit Authority
- Line: Dan Ryan branch
- Platforms: 1 island platform
- Tracks: 2
- Connections: at 35th Street; CTA & Pace buses

Construction
- Structure type: Expressway median
- Cycle facilities: Yes
- Accessible: Yes

History
- Opened: September 26, 1969 (formal opening); September 28, 1969 (full service)
- Rebuilt: 2000 (elevator added); 2002–03 (station house renovation); 2005–06 (station renovation); 2013 (refurbished)
- Former names: 35-Sox Park (station sign)

Passengers
- 2025: 1,052,978 ▲36.3%

Services
Preceding station	Chicago "L"	Following station
Cermak–Chinatown toward Howard	Red Line	47th toward 95th/Dan Ryan
Track layout
Location

Sox–35th is an 'L' station on the CTA's Red Line. It is situated at 142 West 35th Street in the Armour Square neighborhood. The station opened on September 28, 1969, along with the other eight stations on the Dan Ryan branch.

The station serves Rate Field, the stadium of the Chicago White Sox, and takes its name from this location, originally serving the now-demolished Comiskey Park (which was also known as "Sox Park" from 1962 until 1976, during the time of construction for Sox–35th), which had been located across the street from the current park. It is also close to the Illinois Institute of Technology and VanderCook College of Music, though 35th–Bronzeville–IIT (Green Line) is closer to some parts of that campus.

On April 3, 2011, a new station opened on the adjacent Metra Rock Island Line at 35th/Lou Jones/Bronzeville.

== History ==
=== Structure ===
Sox–35th station is located in the median of the Dan Ryan Expressway. The main entrance to the station is on the 35th Street overpass; that entrance is accessible by an elevator. An auxiliary entrance is located on the 33rd Street overpass, and this entrance connects to the station via a pedestrian bridge. At both entrances, a fare turnstile is located at street level and passengers must take stairs, an escalator, or the elevator to the platform. The platform is an island platform; northbound trains stop on the east side, and southbound trains stop on the west side.

=== Construction ===
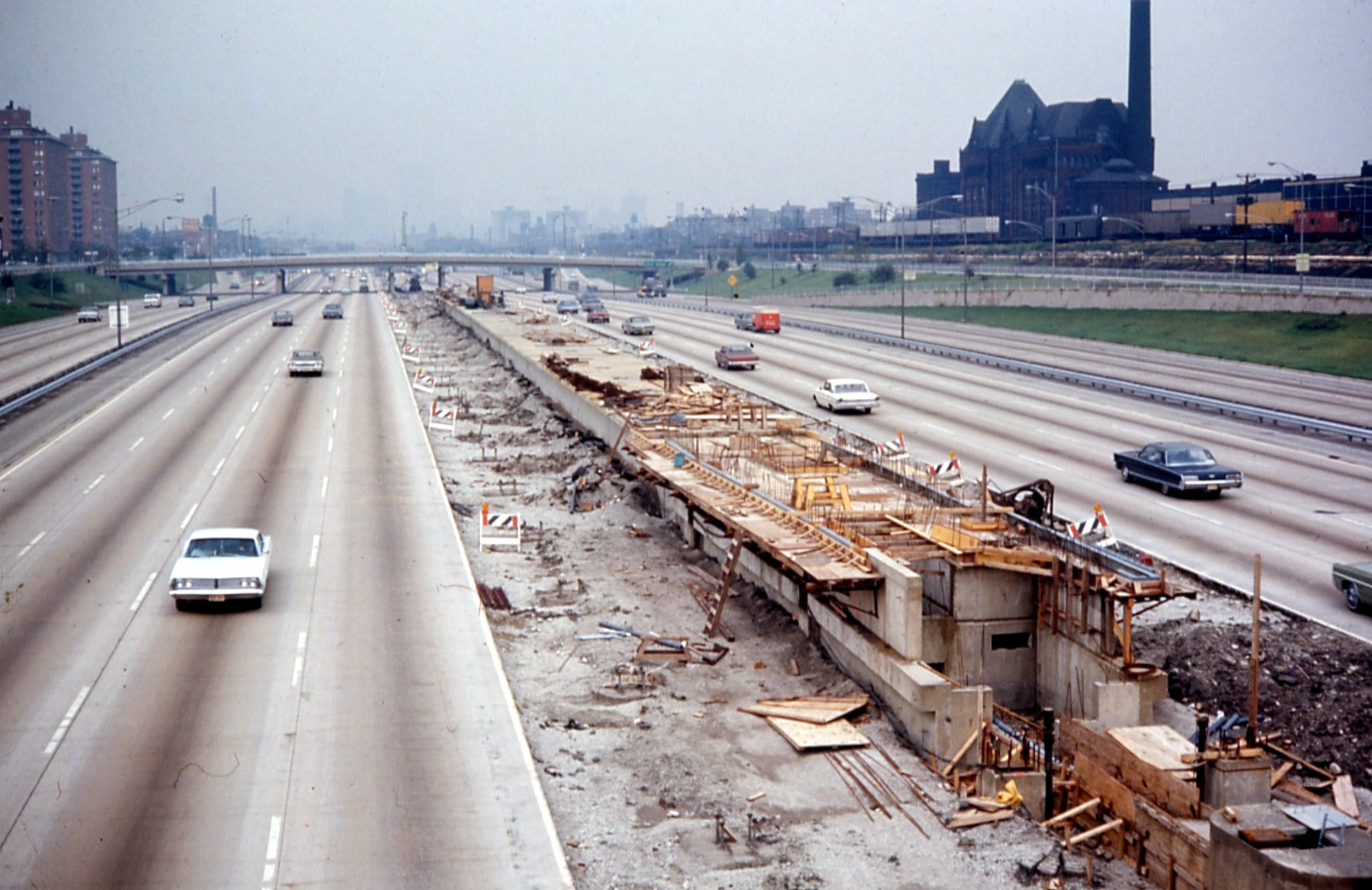
Sox–35th under construction in 1968.

A rapid transit line in the median of the Dan Ryan Expressway was initially proposed in 1958, before the expressway was built. In 1966, Chicago voters passed a bond issue to provide $28 million in funding for new rail lines in the median of the Dan Ryan and Kennedy Expressways, qualifying the routes for federal aid funds. The Chicago Plan commission approved plans for the new routes in January 1967, estimating the cost of the Dan Ryan line to be $38 million; Sox–35th, called White Sox–Illinois Tech at the time, was included in the plans. Federal funding for the lines was approved in March 1967. Mayor Richard J. Daley subsequently stated that construction would begin immediately and projected the lines would open by the beginning of 1969, though engineers expected an opening date in late 1969 or early 1970. Sox–35th and the other Dan Ryan stations opened on September 28, 1969. The final cost of the line was $38 million; the Chicago Tribune noted that it was constructed "in virtually record time". Three days before the line opened, the CTA ran free trains on the route between Sox–35th and 95th. The new route led to the Loop in the north and continued west along the Lake Street Elevated; trains did not follow the current alignment of the Red Line north of Sox–35th until 1993.

=== 1979 closure ===
On January 29, 1979, the CTA closed 14 stations during rush-hour service, including Sox–35th, due to equipment shortages caused by the Chicago Blizzard of 1979. After an outcry from riders and several African-American politicians, Sox–35th and three other stations reopened the following day. The remaining stations reopened later in the week after the Urban Mass Transportation Administration warned the CTA that the closings may have been a civil rights violation. The Chicago Tribune considered the closings to be a factor in Mayor Michael Bilandic's loss to Jane Byrne in the 1979 Democratic mayoral primary, noting Byrne's large margin of victory in predominantly black wards affected by the closings.

=== Rehabilitation project ===
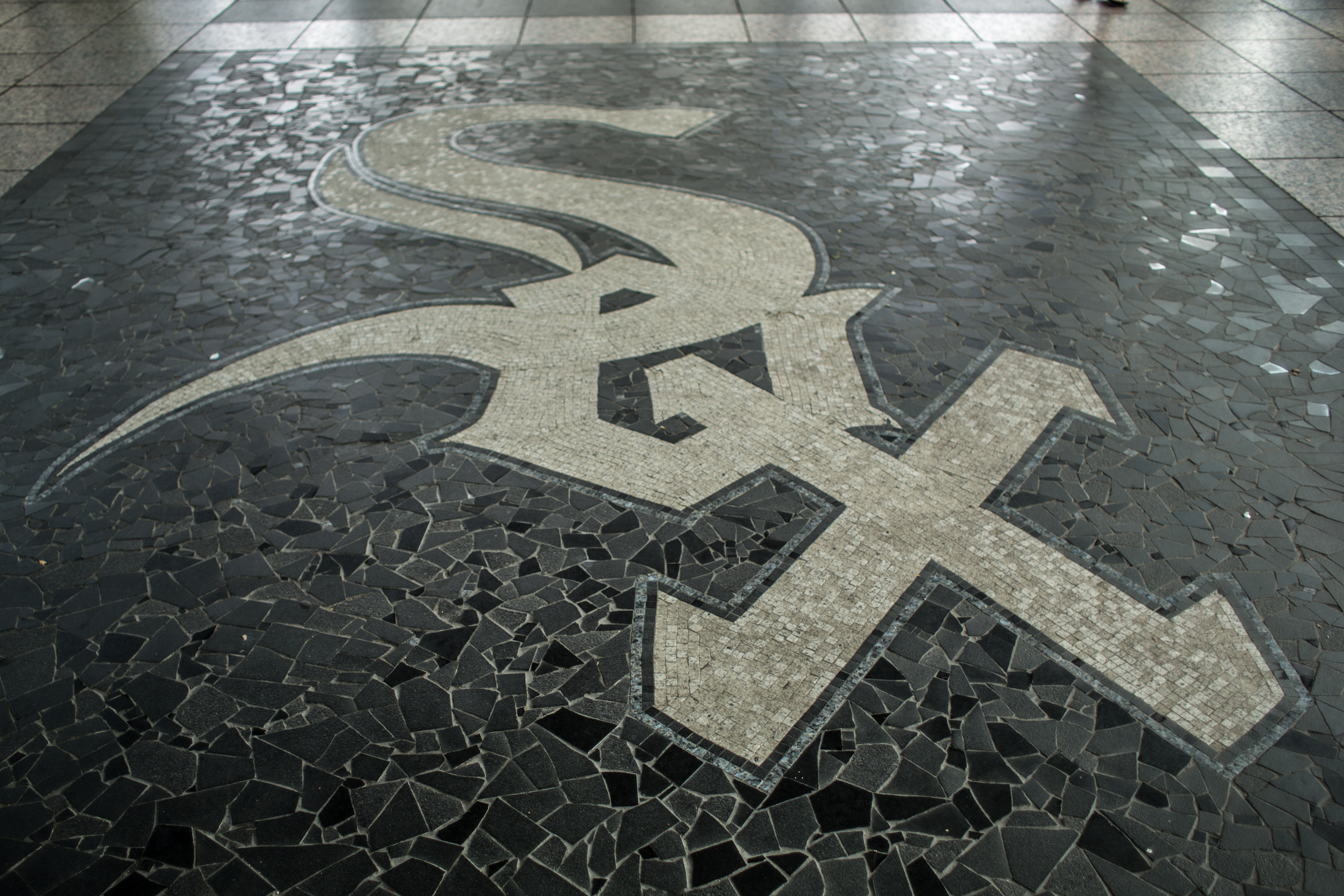
Chicago White Sox logo in the station floor

In 2002, the CTA announced that it would rehabilitate Sox–35th and seven other stations on the Dan Ryan branch. During the renovations, the escalators at Sox–35th were replaced, its lighting and flooring were upgraded, and a granite tile White Sox logo was added to the floor. In addition, workers improved the 35th Street bridge adjacent to the station, replacing its sidewalks and canopies. The renovations to Sox–35th cost over $13 million and concluded in time for the 2003 Major League Baseball All-Star Game at U.S. Cellular Field.

=== 2013 closure ===
The station closed on May 19, 2013 as part of the Red Line South Reconstruction project and reopened on October 20, 2013.

== Bus and rail connections ==
CTA

- 24 Wentworth (weekdays only)
- 31 31st (weekdays only)
- 35 31st/35th
- 39 Pershing

Metra

- Rock Island (at 35th Street)
