= Auburn Gresham Bungalow Historic District =

- U.S. National Register of Historic Places
- U.S. Historic district
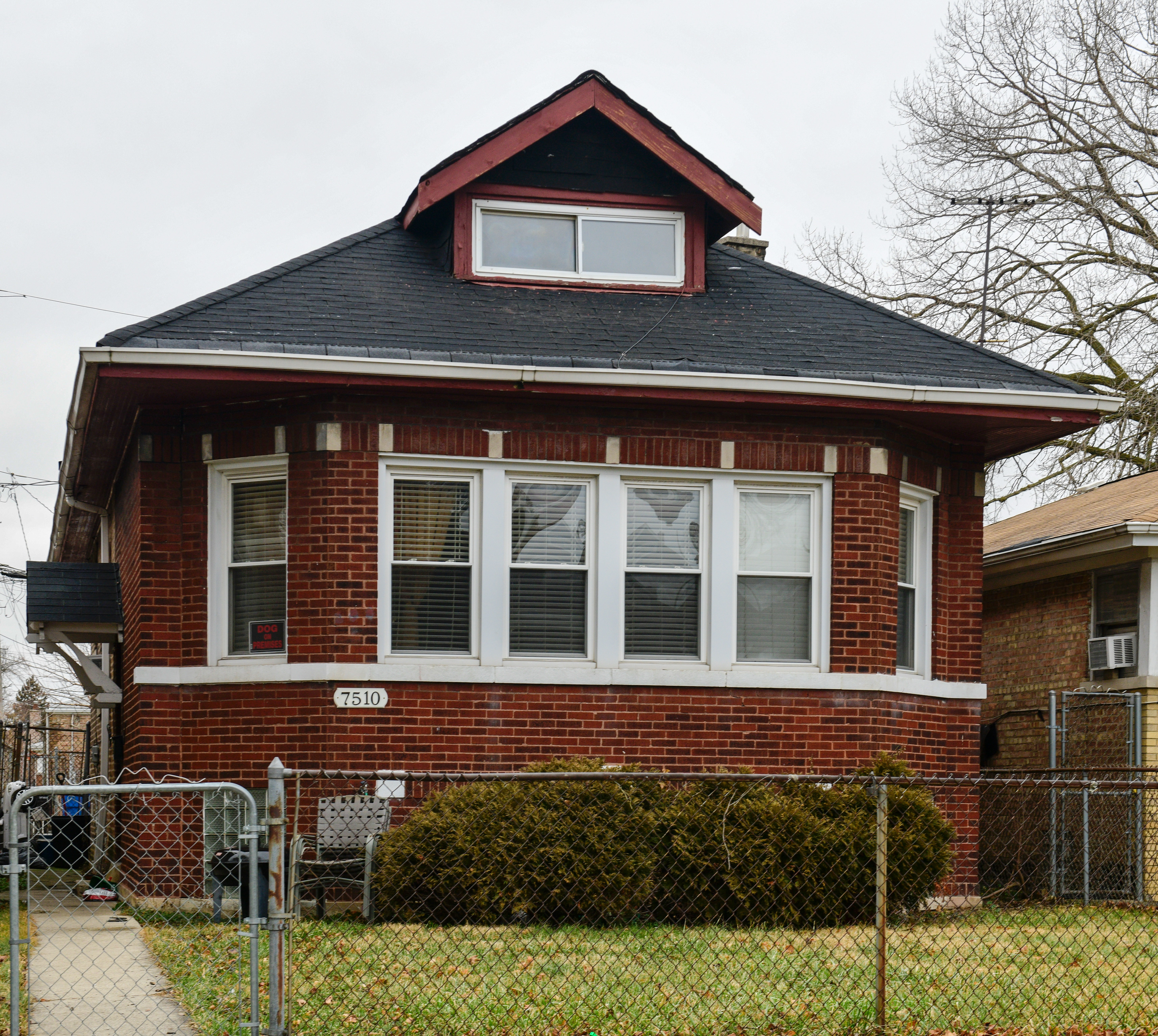
- 7510 S. Wolcott

- Location within Chicago metropolitan area Location within Illinois Location within the United States
- Location: Roughly bounded by S. Paulina, 78th, & 75th Sts., & S. Winchester Ave., Chicago, Illinois
- Coordinates: 41°45′17″N 87°40′08″W
- Area: 48 acres (19 ha)
- Architectural style: Chicago Bungalow
- MPS: Chicago Bungalows MPS
- NRHP reference No.: 12000841
- Added to NRHP: October 9, 2012

The Auburn Gresham Bungalow Historic District is a residential historic district in the Auburn Gresham neighborhood of Chicago, Illinois. The district includes 264 Chicago bungalows built from 1918 to 1932 along with a variety of other residential buildings. Homeownership became more attainable for working-class Chicagoans in the early twentieth century, and affordable bungalows played a key role in this pattern, with tens of thousands of the homes built in the city. Auburn Gresham, a South Side neighborhood with railroad access and little prior development, was one of the many parts of the city developed during the bungalow boom. While thirty-two different architects designed homes in the district, the bungalows are still relatively similar, as the uniform building design was a major factor in their affordability; however, elements such as color and brickwork distinguish the individual homes.

The district was added to the National Register of Historic Places on October 9, 2012.
