= Rock Island District =

Commuter rail line between Chicago and Joliet, Illinois

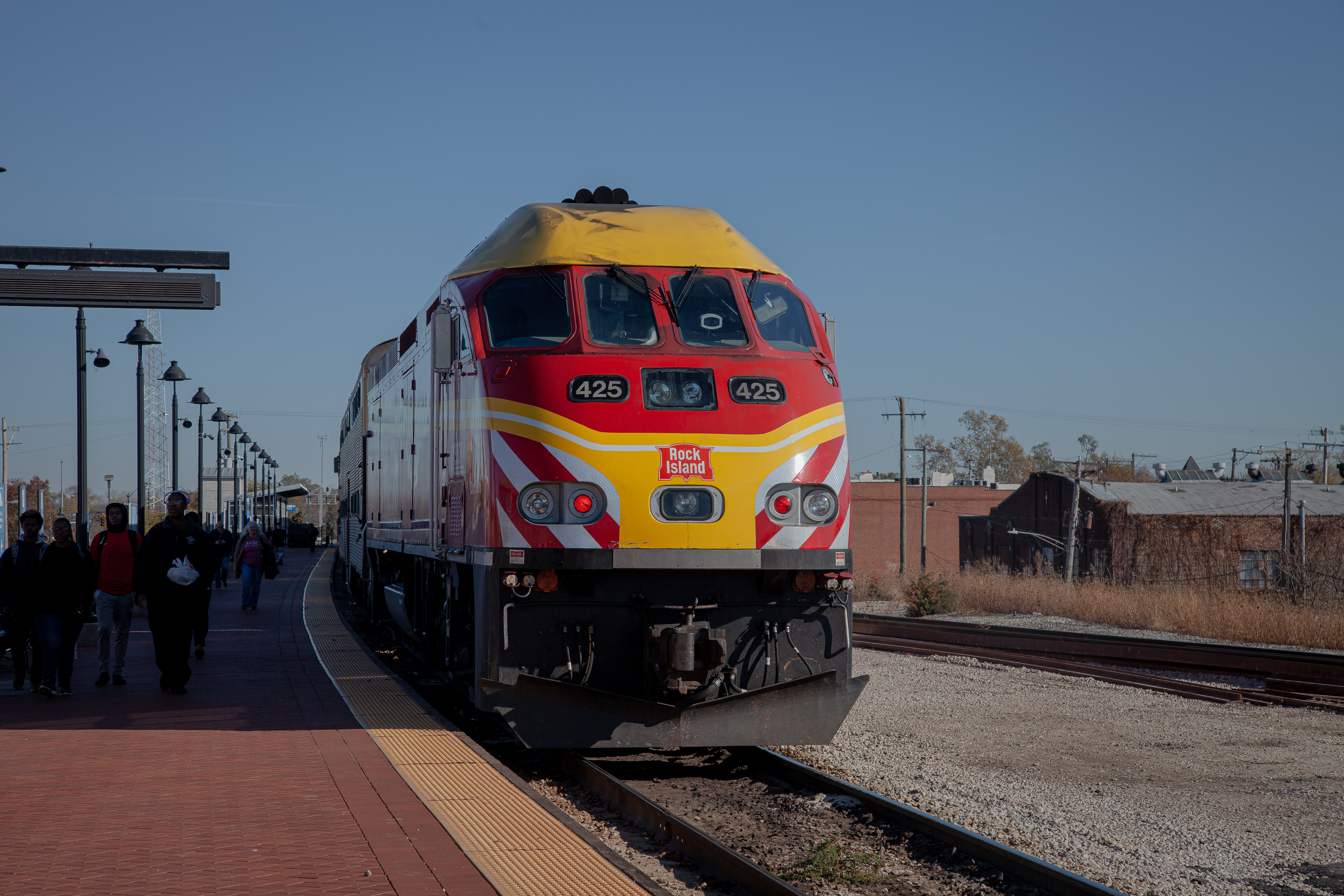
- Metra Rock Island heritage unit at Joliet Gateway Center

Overview
- Owner: Metra
- Termini: LaSalle Street Station; Joliet
- Stations: 15 (via Main Line); 24 (via Beverly Branch); 26 (total) (1 under construction)
- Website: metra.com/train-lines/ri

Service
- Type: Commuter rail
- System: Metra
- Operator(s): Metra, CSX, IAIS, Chicago Rail Link
- Daily ridership: 32,100 (avg. weekday 2009)
- Ridership: 3,363,873 (2025)

History
- Opened: April 1, 1870 (Beverly Branch)

Technical
- Line length: 40.0 mi (64.4 km); 6.7 mi (10.8 km) Beverly Branch (Gresham Jct.—Blue Island)
- Track gauge: 4 ft 8 1/2 in (1,435 mm) standard gauge
Route map
Rock Island District highlighted in red
- ◇ = under construction
Key
- Mileage source All stations are accessible except Gresham, 123rd Street, and Prairie Street.

The Rock Island District (RID or RI) is a Metra commuter rail line from Chicago, Illinois, southwest to Joliet. Metra does not refer to its lines by color, but the timetable accents for the Rock Island District line are "Rocket Red" in honor of the Chicago, Rock Island and Pacific Railroad's Rocket passenger trains.

Its Beverly Branch (also called the Suburban Branch or Suburban Line) branches to the west of the main line at 89th Street to make local stops in the communities of Washington Heights, Beverly, Morgan Park and Blue Island, before merging back onto the main line at Blue Island/Vermont Street station.

== History ==
The Suburban Line was built in 1870 as a steam dummy line, splitting from the main line just north of 99th Street, running west along 99th and turning south to the present line at the S-curve just south of 99th. The crossing of the Pittsburgh, Cincinnati, Chicago and St. Louis Railway midway along 99th was known as Dummy Crossing. In the early 1890s the line was extended north to 89th Street in conjunction with the expansion of the Chicago Terminal Transfer Railroad, and the portion on 99th was removed.

The track is owned by Metra, bought from the bankrupt Chicago, Rock Island and Pacific Railroad for $35 million in December 1982 (equivalent to $117 million in 2025). The Regional Transportation Authority had signed a contract with the Rock Island in 1976 to fund service, and in 1980 the Chicago and North Western Railway began operating the Rock Island District (the Rock Island also ceased operations that year.) In spring 1981 the C&NW stepped away, and the Northeast Illinois Regional Commuter Railroad Corporation (Metra) was formed to take over operations. Through freight trains on the line are operated by CSX and Iowa Interstate Railroad on a trackage rights agreement. In addition, Chicago Rail Link has rights to operate local freight service on the whole district, and it also uses the line between Gresham Wye and Blue Island to connect with the Iowa Interstate and Indiana Harbor Belt Railroads.

In 2005, a train derailed when it attempted to traverse a 10 mph (16 km/h) interlocking at 69 mph (111 km/h). Two people were killed and 83 were injured.

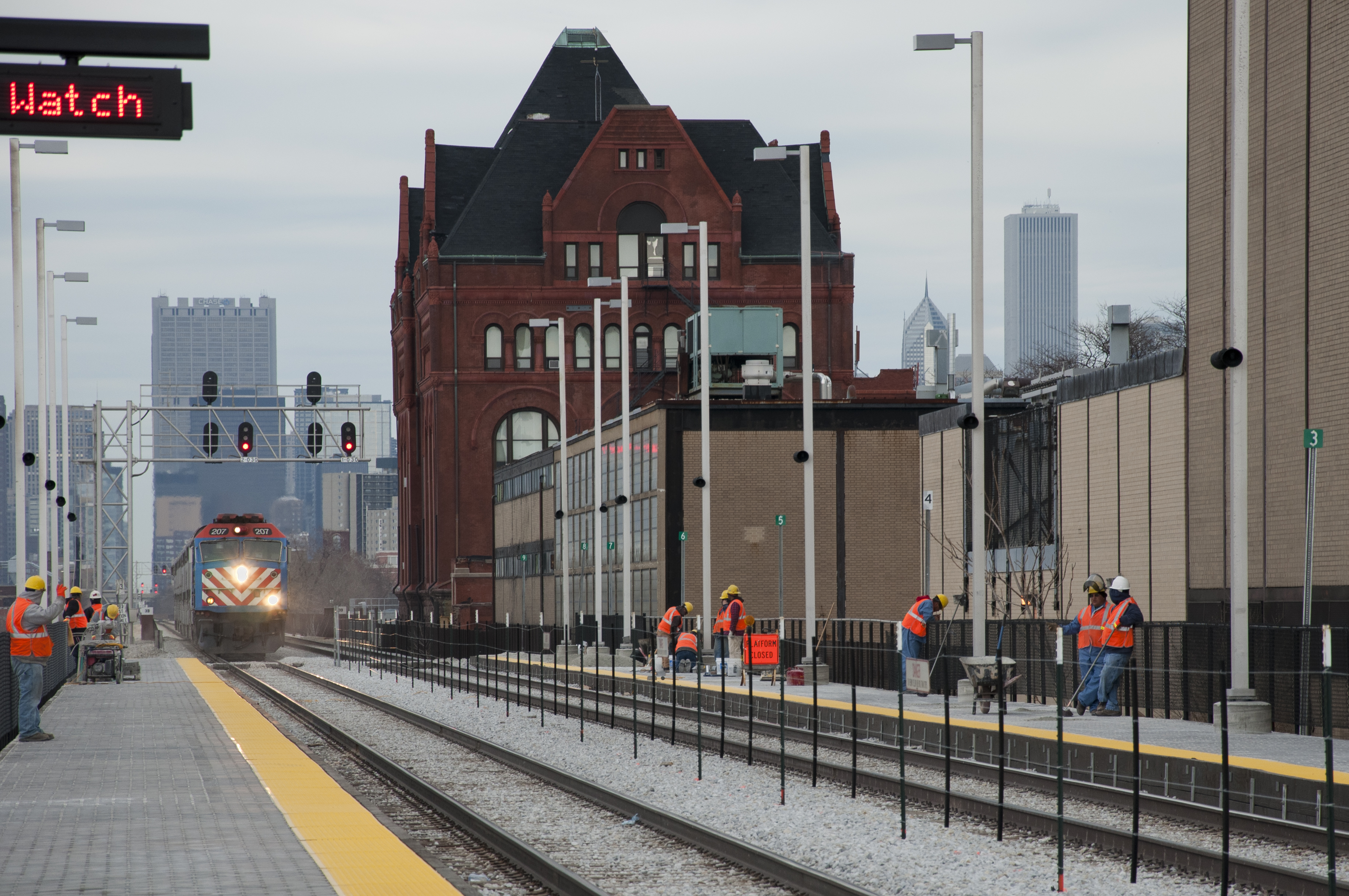
35th Street "Lou" Jones is the newest station on the RID, opened in 2011

A new station at 35th Street and Federal Street opened on April 3, 2011 to serve U.S. Cellular Field (now Rate Field) and the Illinois Institute of Technology. It was named 35th Street/'Lou' Jones/Bronzeville Station after Lovana Jones who was an Illinois State Representative in the Bronzeville neighborhood.

The Englewood Flyover, an overpass located in the Chicago neighborhood of Englewood, eliminated delays for the Rock Island. The overpass replaced a diamond crossing with the Norfolk Southern's Chicago Line. The overpass proposed by Chicago Region Environmental and Transportation Efficiency Program (CREATE), which cost $142 million to construct, was completed in October 2014.

In recent years, Metra has expressed a desire to electrify and modernize the line if funding became available. In October of 2023, Metra announced the order of 16 lightweight Stadler FLIRT Akku electric multiple unit trainsets that would likely be used on the Beverly Branch. They could be used to increase frequency and speed.

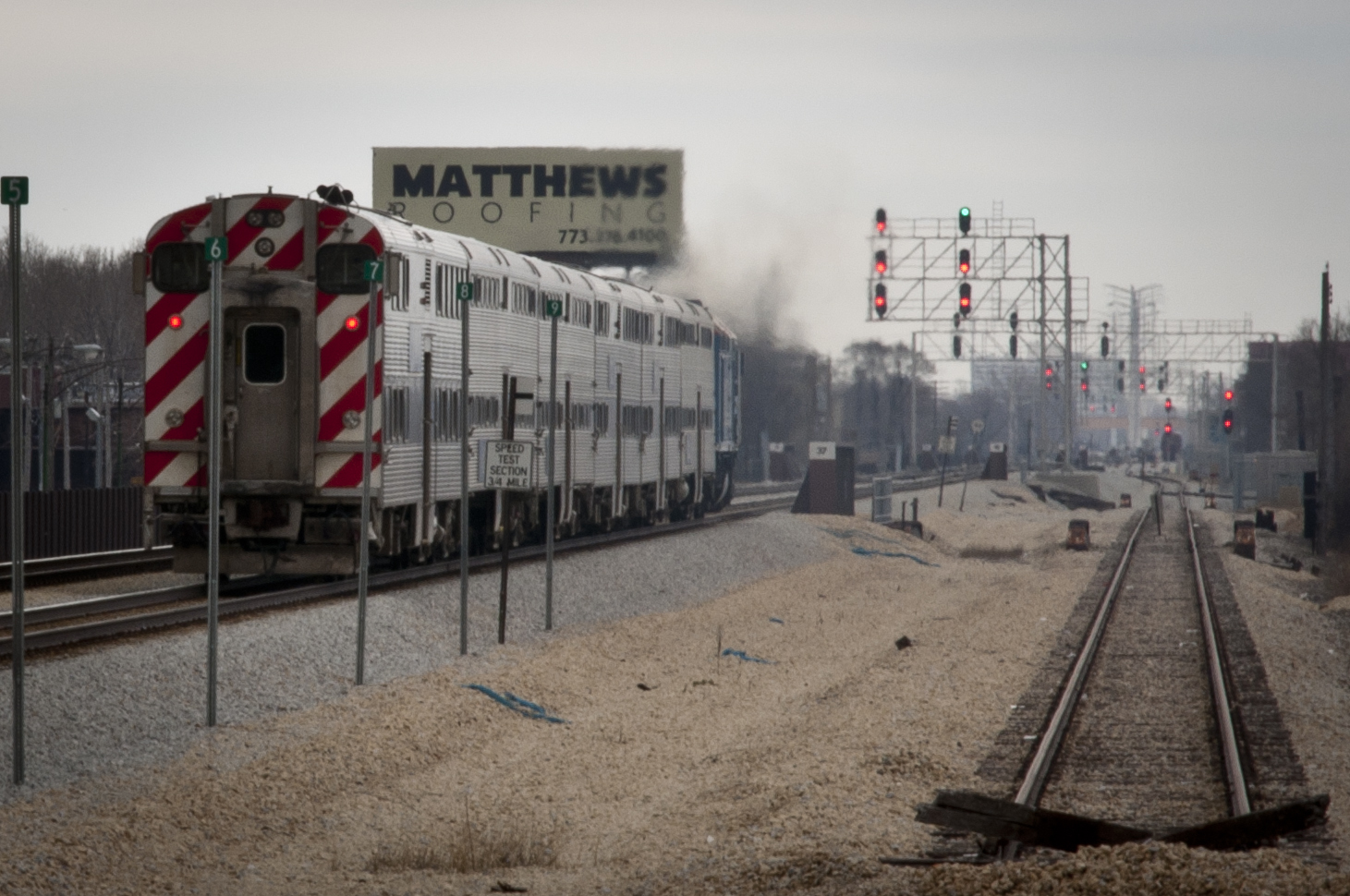
Location of the new third main track that would be built to accommodate future SWS and Amtrak trains

In 2022, an alternative project to those presented under the Chicago Region Environmental and Transportation Efficiency Program (CREATE) was presented, whereby Amtrak's Lincoln Service and Texas Eagle services running between Joliet and Chicago Union Station could be rerouted via Rock Island District. This option, due to the absence of diamond crossings and low freight train activity, will allow Amtrak services to reduce delays and increase higher speeds between Joliet and Chicago, bypassing the circuitous route through CN Joliet Subdivision they currently use. The heavy freight traffic on the Joliet Sub causes frequent delays to Amtrak trains, and the option to reroute the Texas Eagle and Lincoln Service through the Rock Island District is Amtrak's preferred choice and has been approved by the Federal Railroad Administration (FRA). However, for Amtrak trains to operate on the Rock Island District, modifications would be required in Joliet and Chicago. A third platform would need to be constructed at Joliet Gateway Center, and Amtrak would have to improve the current connection via the St. Charles Air Line between the RID and Union Station. The current connection sees occasional use during maintenance and emergencies, but it limits trains to a maximum speed of 5 mph (8 km/h) and requires trains to reverse into Union Station.

== Service ==
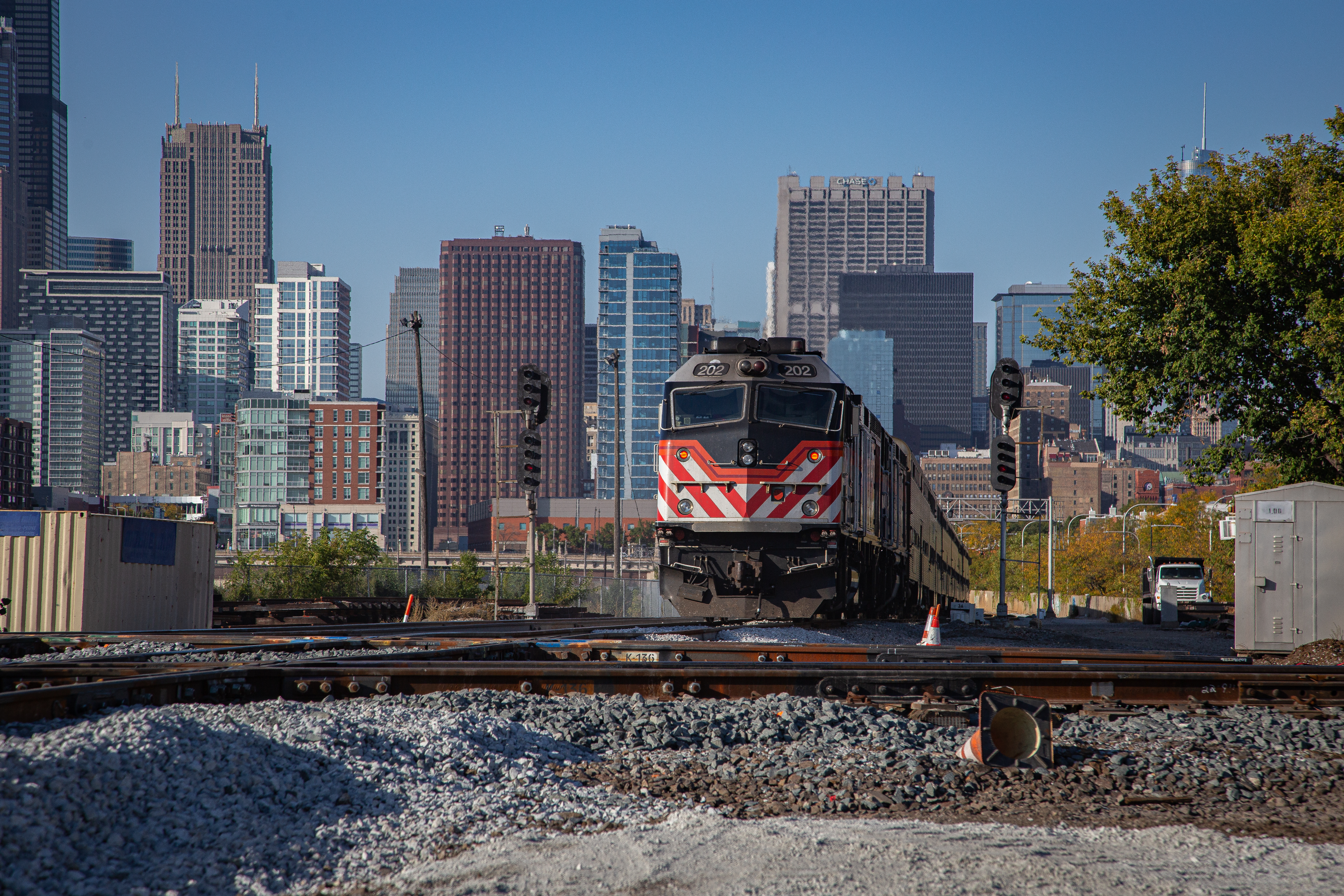
Metra Rock Island train in Chicago heading to LaSalle Street Station

As of June 1, 2026, Metra operates 84 trains (42 in each direction) on the Rock Island District on weekdays, with 22 inbound and 23 outbound trains providing service between LaSalle Street and Joliet, three to and from 80th Avenue/Tinley Park, and 17 inbound and 16 outbound trains to and from Blue Island/Vermont Street. Between Gresham and Blue Island, trains terminating at Blue Island as well as evening through-trains to and from Joliet operate via the suburban branch, while all other trains remain on the mainline.

On weekends, Metra operates 40 trains (20 in each direction) on the line, with 13 trains in each direction running between LaSalle Street and Joliet, and seven trains running between LaSalle Street and Blue Island. The Blue Island short-turn trains, as well as the last inbound and last two outbound through-trains to and from Joliet operate over the suburban branch, while the other through-trains operate via the mainline.

In June 2015, Metra began weekend express service on the Rock Island District. The six express trains that operate on both Saturday and Sunday run express from 35th Street to Blue Island-Vermont Street via the main line before making all stops to Joliet, bypassing the suburban branch entirely. Local trains run as well, making all stops on the suburban branch and terminating at Blue Island-Vermont Street. This cuts about 20 minutes off the trips from Blue Island to downtown. On August 23, 2015, Metra announced that the weekend express service would become permanent upon completion of the trial period on November 29, 2015.

The Rock Island District runs a few empty equipment move (deadhead) trains, most during weekdays. Inbound deadheads are scheduled between the Joliet, Mokena-Front Street, and Tinley Park stations and run to Blue Island-Vermont Street.

There have been proposals to extend the line from Joliet to LaSalle-Peru in LaSalle County with intermediate stations at Rockdale, Minooka, Morris, Seneca, Marseilles, Ottawa, and several other towns. A feasibility study was completed in 2003. As of 2022, an extension only as far as Minooka has been considered feasible in the near future, and there are no currently active plans to carry out the extension.

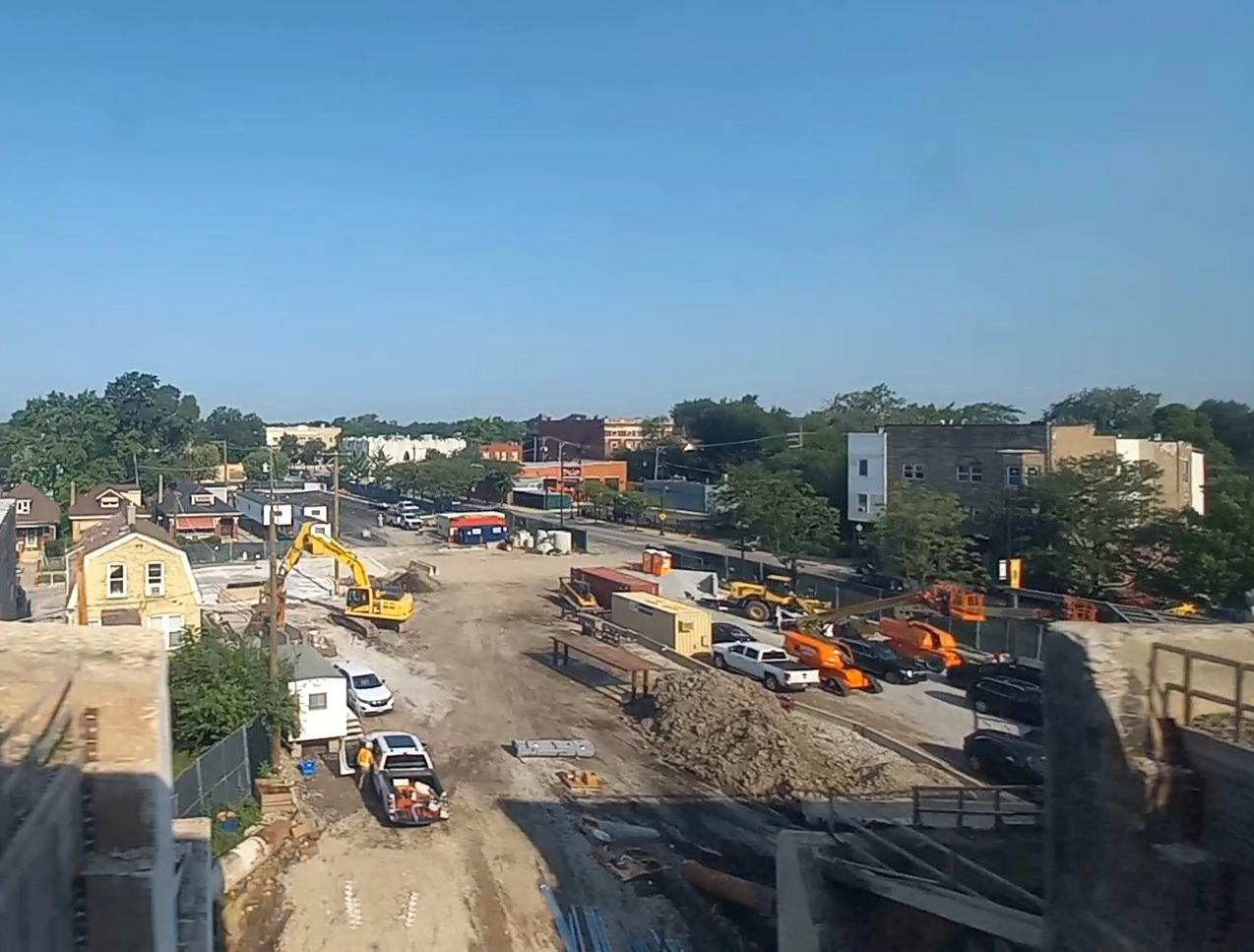
Construction of the new Auburn Park station in July 2024

After the passage of the Rebuild Illinois, $20 million was allocated for the long planned construction of a new Auburn Park station. Construction is expected to start in 2020.

In the beginning of 2021, fares on the Rock Island, as well as the Metra Electric District, were cut in half for all passengers as part of a pilot program.

=== NITA regional rail pilot ===
On June 1, 2026, the Northern Illinois Transit Authority Act (SB 2111) took effect. The new law replaces Metra's current parent agency, the Regional Transportation Authority (RTA), with the Northern Illinois Transit Authority (NITA). A provision of the new law mandates that Metra launch a regional rail pilot on the Rock Island District by 2027.

Metra announced at its May 2026 board meeting its phased plan to implement the regional rail pilot:

- Phase 0.5: Beginning on June 1, 2026, additional trains will be added on weekday evenings and weekends to the current schedule, with flag stops changing to regular stops.
- Phase 1.0: In late 2026, Beverly branch service will be separated from the main line which will result in headways of 30-minutes or better at all stations within the City of Chicago.
- Phase 2.0: 30-minute headways on the main line between LaSalle Street Station and either Tinley Park or Mokena. Some additional sidings and crossovers may need to be built.
- Phase 3.0: 30-minute headways on the entire length of the main line to the Joliet Gateway Center. In order for this to be implemented, a flyover would need to be built at the diamond crossing of the RID with Canadian National's Matteson Subdivision (ex-EJ&E). The proposed flyover would also allow Amtrak trains to travel on the RID rather than the Heritage Corridor as there would no longer be any freight train conflicts.

== Ridership ==
From 2014-2019 annual ridership declined from 8,544,753 to 7,338,133, an overall decline of 14.1%. Due to the COVID-19 pandemic, ridership dropped to 1,952,547 passengers in 2020 and 1,669,273 passengers in 2021. The line's 3,363,873 riders in 2025 made it the seventh busiest Metra line.

== Stations ==
County	Zone	Location	Station	Connections and notes
Cook	1	Chicago	LaSalle Street Station	Chicago "L": Blue (at LaSalle), Brown Orange Pink Purple (at LaSalle/Van Buren); CTA buses: 1 7 22 24 36 126 130 151 156; City of Valparaiso: ChicaGo Dash
Cook	2	Chicago	35th Street	Chicago "L": Red (at Sox–35th), Green (at 35th–Bronzeville–IIT); CTA buses: 24 31 35 39
Cook		Chicago	Englewood	Closed late 1970s
Cook		Chicago	Normal Park	Closed 1963
Cook		Chicago	Hamilton Park	Closed 1982
Cook		Chicago	Auburn Park	Closed 1978, to reopen in late 2026
Cook	2	Chicago	Gresham	CTA buses: 8A 24 87
Cook	2	Chicago	Beverly branch begins	
Cook	2	Chicago	95th Street/Longwood	CTA buses: N9 95 112; Pace: 381, 395
Cook	2	Chicago	99th Street/Longwood	Closed 1985
Cook	2	Chicago	103rd Street/Washington Heights	CTA buses: 9 103 112
Cook	2	Chicago	Givins	Closed 1984
Cook	2	Blue Island	Blue Island/Vermont Street	Metra: Metra Electric (at Blue Island); Pace: 348, 349, 359, 385
Cook	2	Blue Island	Beverly branch ends	
Cook	2	Robbins	Robbins	Pace: 359
Cook	2	Midlothian	Midlothian	Pace: 354
Cook	3	Oak Forest	Oak Forest	Pace: 354, 364, 383
Cook	3	Tinley Park	Tinley Park	Pace: 386
Cook	4	Tinley Park	80th Avenue/Tinley Park	
Cook	4	Mokena	Hickory Creek	
Will	4	Mokena	Mokena	
Will	4	New Lenox	New Lenox	
Will	4	Joliet	Joliet	Metra: Heritage Corridor; Amtrak: Lincoln Service, Texas Eagle; Pace: 501, 504, 505, 507, 508, 509, 511, 832, 834

=== Beverly branch ===
The entire branch is in Cook County, Illinois.

Zone	Location	Station	Connections and notes
2	Chicago	Brainerd	CTA buses: 9
2	Chicago	91st Street/Beverly Hills	
2	Chicago	95th Street/Beverly Hills	CTA buses: 95; Pace: 381, 395
2	Chicago	99th Street/Beverly Hills	
2	Chicago	103rd Street/Beverly Hills	CTA buses: 103
2	Chicago	107th Street/Beverly Hills	
2	Chicago	111th Street/Morgan Park	CTA buses: 112
2	Chicago	115th Street/Morgan Park	
2	Blue Island	119th Street	CTA buses: 119
2	Blue Island	123rd Street (rush only)	
2	Blue Island	Prairie Street (rush only)	
2	Blue Island	Blue Island/Vermont Street	Metra: Metra Electric (at Blue Island); Pace: 348, 349, 359, 385

== See also ==
- Beverly/Morgan Railroad District
