= 2005 Metra Rock Island derailment =

2005 train derailment

Details
- Date: September 27, 2005; 8:35 a.m. local time (14:35 UTC)
- Location: Chicago, Illinois, US
- Coordinates: 41.8089°N 87.6289°W
- Country: United States
- Line: Rock Island District
- Operator: Metra
- Incident type: Derailment
- Cause: Overspeed through interlocking

Statistics
- Trains: 1
- Passengers: 185
- Crew: 4
- Deaths: 2
- Injured: 83

On September 17, 2005, Metra's Rock Island District train No. 504 derailed on approach to LaSalle Street Station in downtown Chicago, Illinois, United States. Arriving from Joliet Union Station, the train was carrying 185 passengers and four crew members; two people were killed and 83 were injured.

== Background ==
The Rock Island District is a Metra commuter rail line from Chicago, Illinois, southwest to Joliet. In 2003, a similar derailment occurred at the same crossover, injuring 45 people.

== Accident ==
Train No. 504 departed Joliet's Union Station on time at 7:24 a.m. (CST) en route to downtown Chicago. At approximately 8:35 a.m., the train violently derailed near Metra's 47th Street Yard south of downtown. The train sustained damage along the sides of the first three coaches, though it was not reported to be severe. The fourth coach struck a nearby bridge girder, causing significant damage to the right front section of the car body. The fifth coach, which was unoccupied, was decoupled at the front by the force of the impact, and ultimately scraped along the barrier wall of the same bridge.

Emergency crews consisting of dozens of ambulances and Life Flight helicopters rushed to the scene.

== Investigation ==
The accident was investigated by the United States Department of Transportation's Rail Accident Forensic Team and the National Transportation Safety Board. The derailment was determined to have been caused by the train attempting to negotiate a slow-speed interlocking, where it should have only been traveling at 10 mph (16 km/h; 4.5 m/s), at 69 mph (111 km/h; 31 m/s), nearly seven times the allowed speed. Positive train control, automated technology that can prevent such accidents from occurring, was not yet universal. The report cited human error as the cause for the crash, blaming one of Metra's engineers for failing to heed crucial warnings, and also blamed the agency's lack of a support system to override human error.
