= Auburn Gresham, Chicago =

Community area in Chicago, Illinois

Auburn Gresham
- Community area
- Community Area 71 - Auburn Gresham
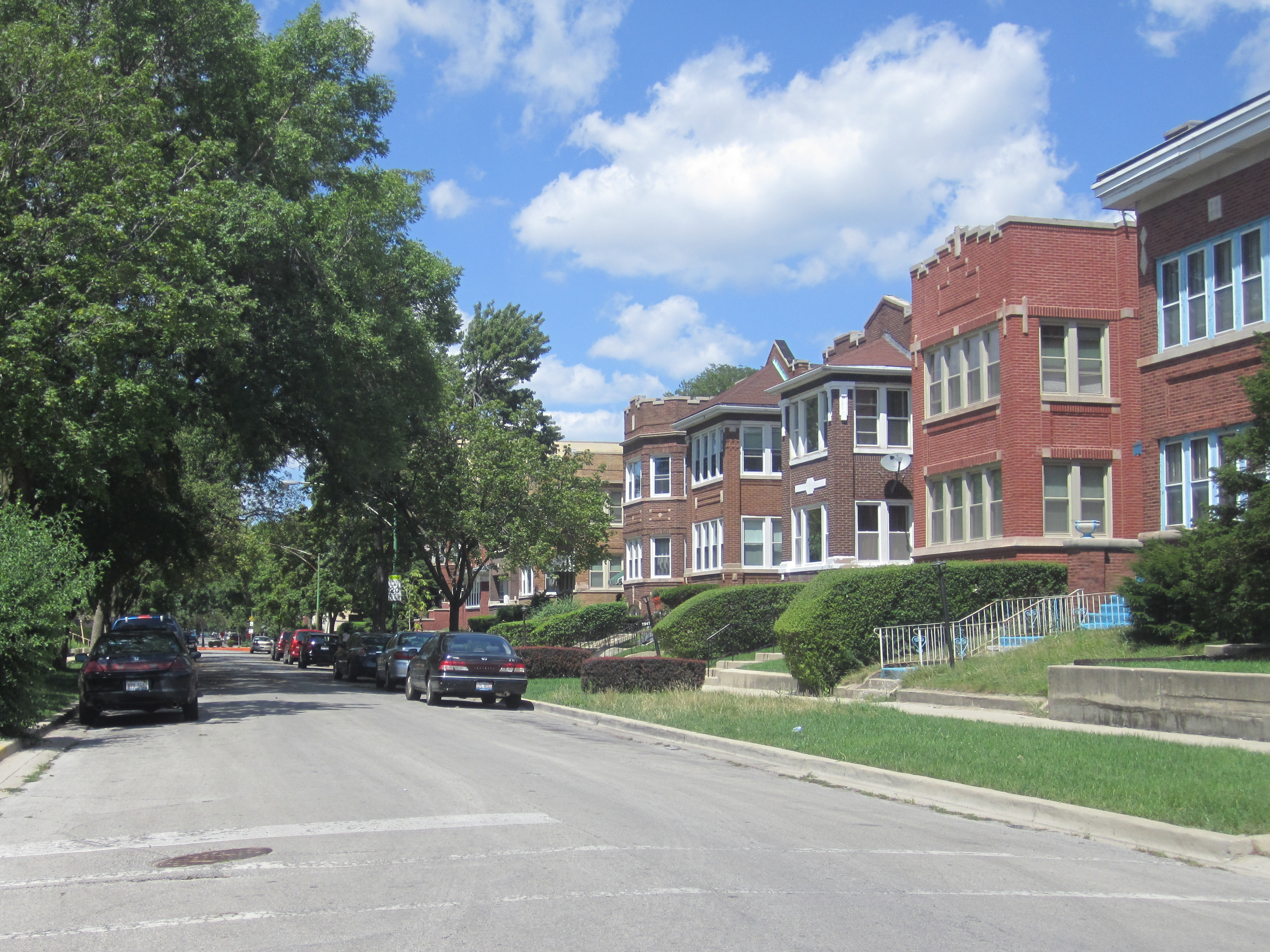
- Two-flats built in the early 20th century are common in Gresham.

- Location within the city of Chicago
- Coordinates: 41°44.4′N 87°39.6′W
- Country: United States
- State: Illinois
- County: Cook
- City: Chicago
- Neighborhoods: list: Auburn Gresham; Gresham

Area
  - Total: 3.77 sq mi (9.76 km^{2})

Population (2024)
  - Total: 43,779
  - Density: 11,600/sq mi (4,490/km^{2})

Demographics (2024)
  - White: 0.5%
  - Black: 92.7%
  - Hispanic: 4.5%
  - Asian: 0.5%
  - Other: 1.7%

Educational Attainment 2024
  - High School Diploma or Higher: 86.2%
  - Bachelor's Degree or Higher: 19.7%
- Time zone: UTC-6 (CST)
  - Summer (DST): UTC-5 (CDT)
- ZIP Codes: part of 60620
- Median income: $37,741
- Source: U.S. Census, Record Information Services

Auburn Gresham is a community area in Chicago, Illinois, on the Far South Side of the city. It was the original location of the South Side Irish Parade before it relocated to the adjoining Beverly neighborhood to the southwest. Its residents are mostly African American.

== Development ==
Auburn Gresham's development as a community dates back to the early nineteenth century, when the area was defined primarily by small German and Dutch settlements. A later influx of Irish railroad workers and others lured to the South Side by newly extended city services in the late nineteenth century led to further residential and commercial growth.

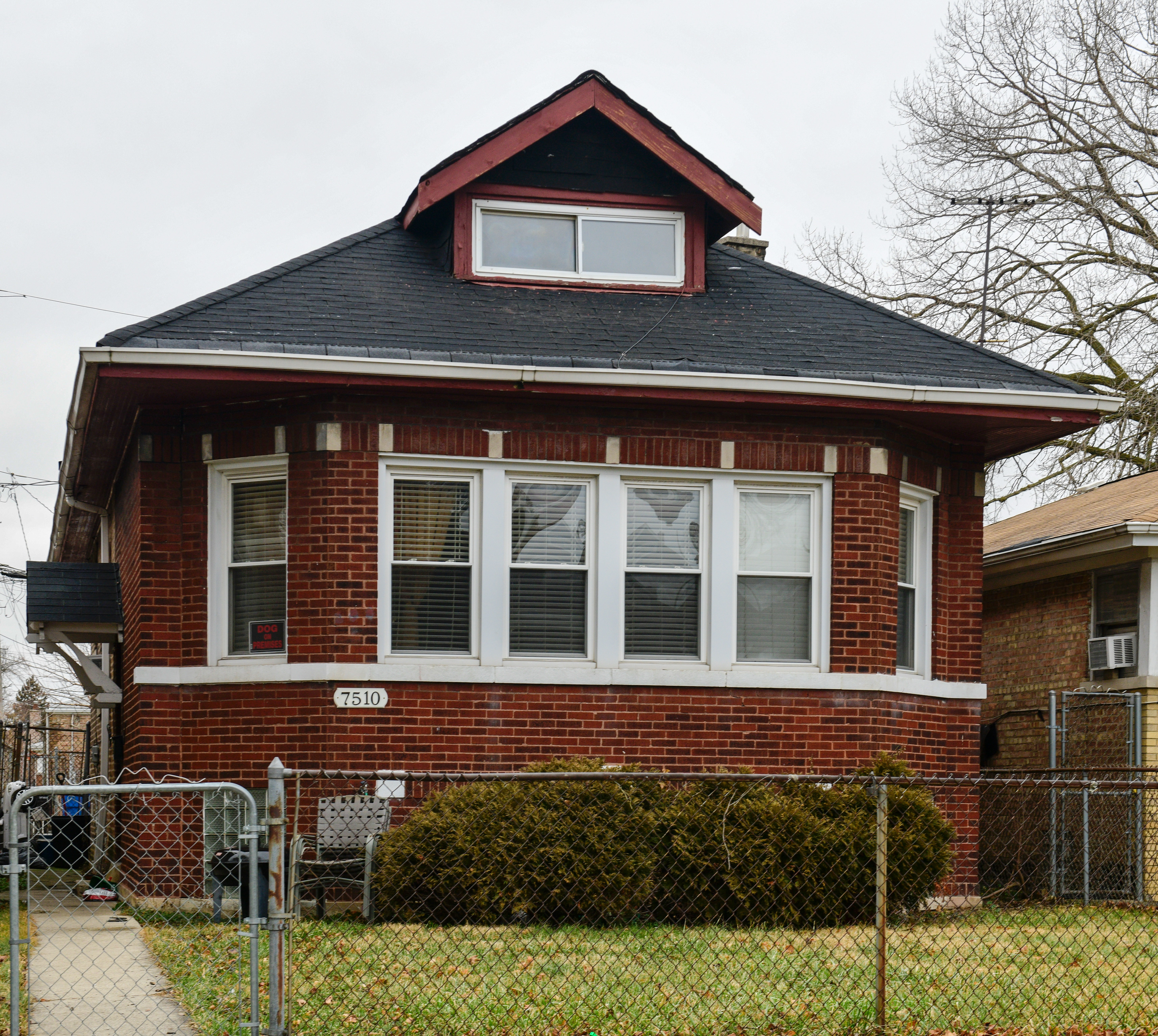
A bungalow in the Auburn Gresham Bungalow Historic District

In the 1920s, the population increased nearly threefold, from 19,558 to 57,381. The plethora of bungalow-style housing and brick two-flat apartment buildings throughout Auburn Gresham serves as lasting evidence of the community's formative years. The Auburn Gresham Bungalow Historic District, featuring 264 brick Chicago bungalows built between 1918 and 1932, is listed on the National Register of Historic Places.

Like most other Southside communities, Auburn Gresham suffered from blockbusting, rising crime, and white flight during the 1960s: the neighborhood was nearly 100% white in 1960, but flipped to being 69% black by the 1970 census.

== Transportation ==
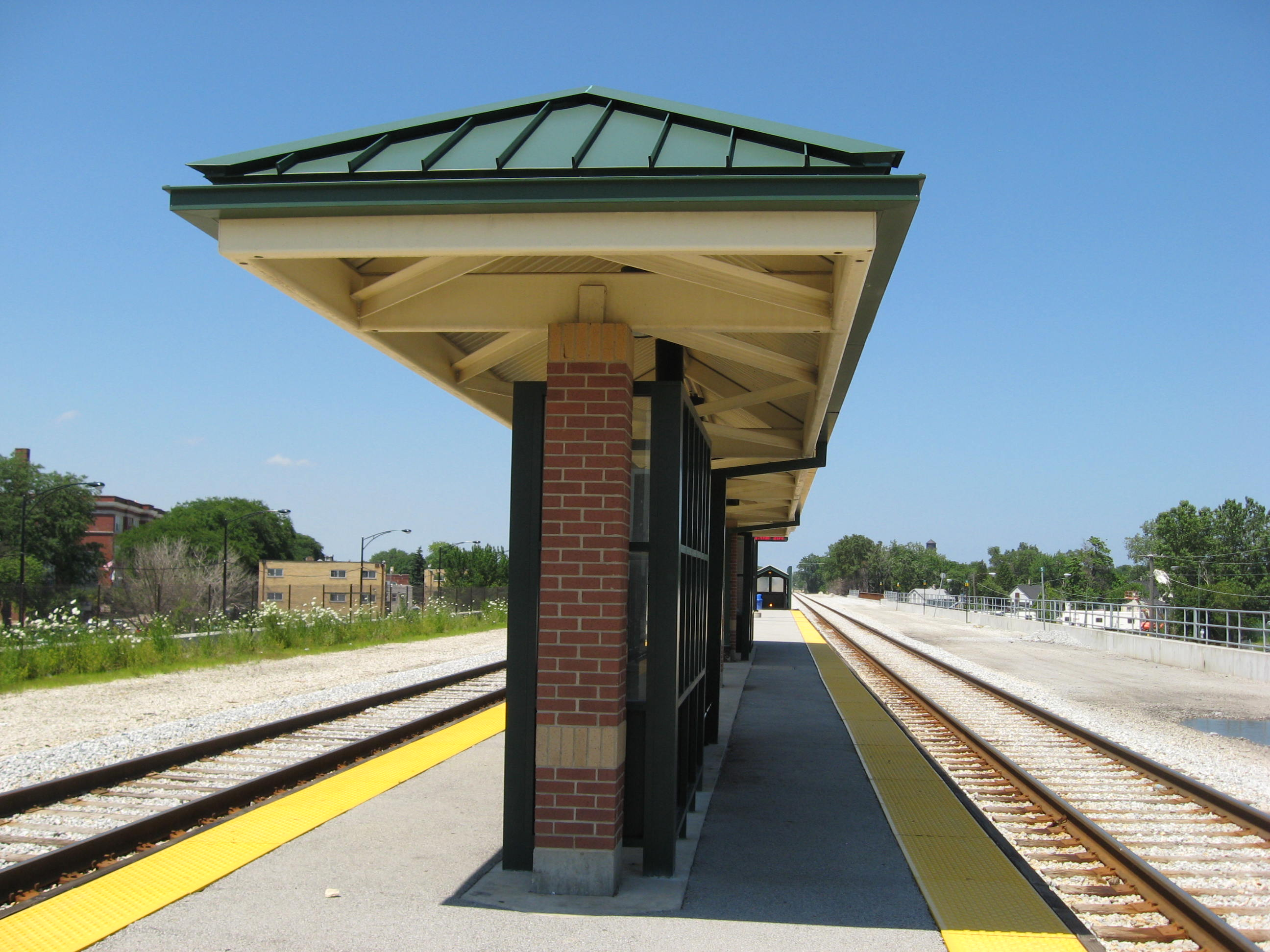
Gresham station

Auburn Gresham is serviced by Gresham station, a Metra commuter rail stop at W. 87th St. and Vincennes Ave. which provides daily inbound service to LaSalle Street Station in Chicago and outbound service to Joliet.

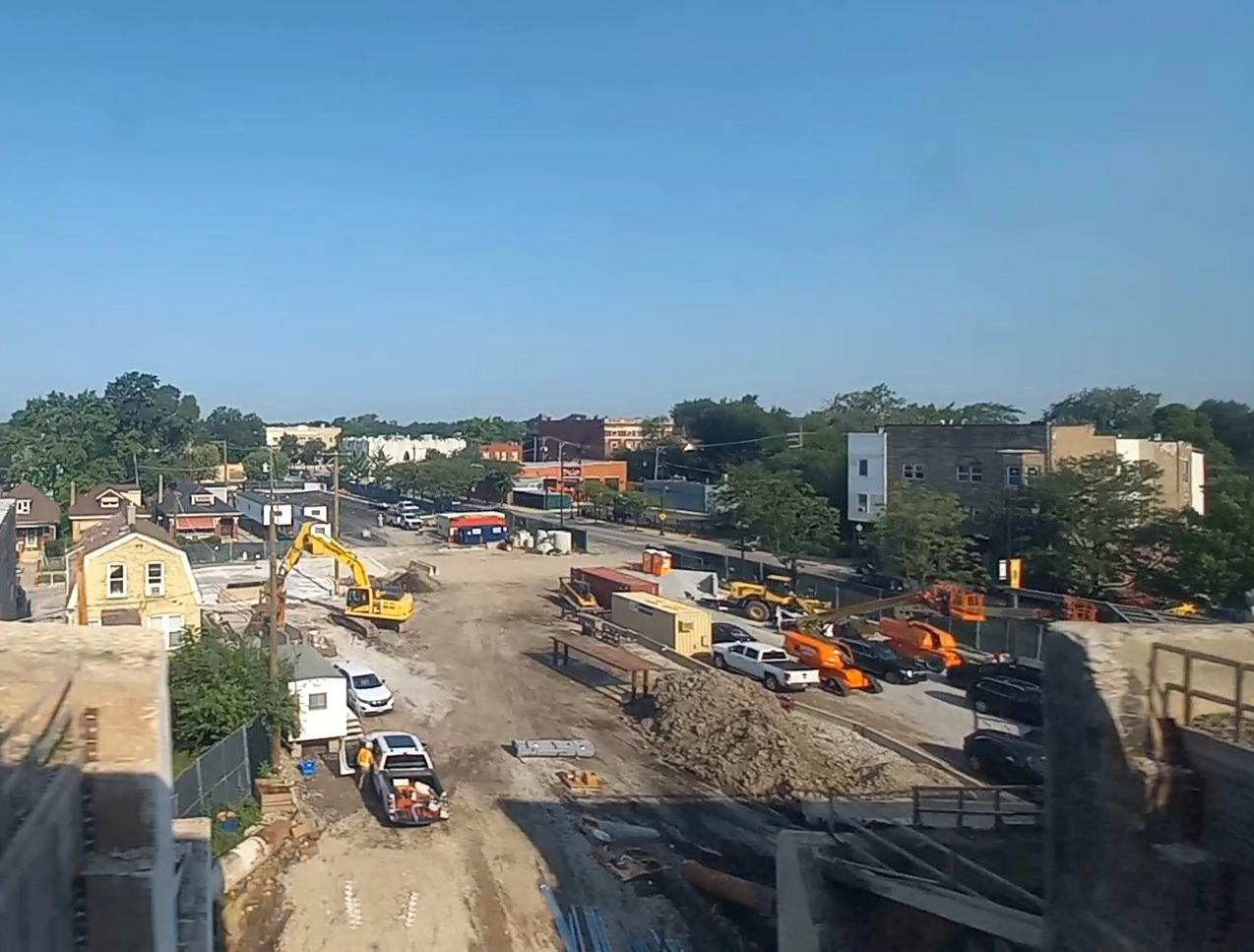
Construction of Auburn Park station, W. 79th St. (2024)

Community leaders have long encouraged the construction of an additional Metra rail stop at W. 79th St. In 2014, the City of Chicago obtained a half-acre parcel of land on which to construct the new Auburn Park station. As of 2025, the station is under construction.

CTA red line stops at 79th St. and 87th St. are also available along the Dan Ryan Expressway in nearby Chatham.

== Landmarks ==
Chicago Public Library operates the Thurgood Marshall Branch in Auburn Gresham at W. 75th St. and S. Racine Ave. The 13,500 square foot library, which features a 125-seat auditorium, reading garden, and several artworks, opened in April 1994.

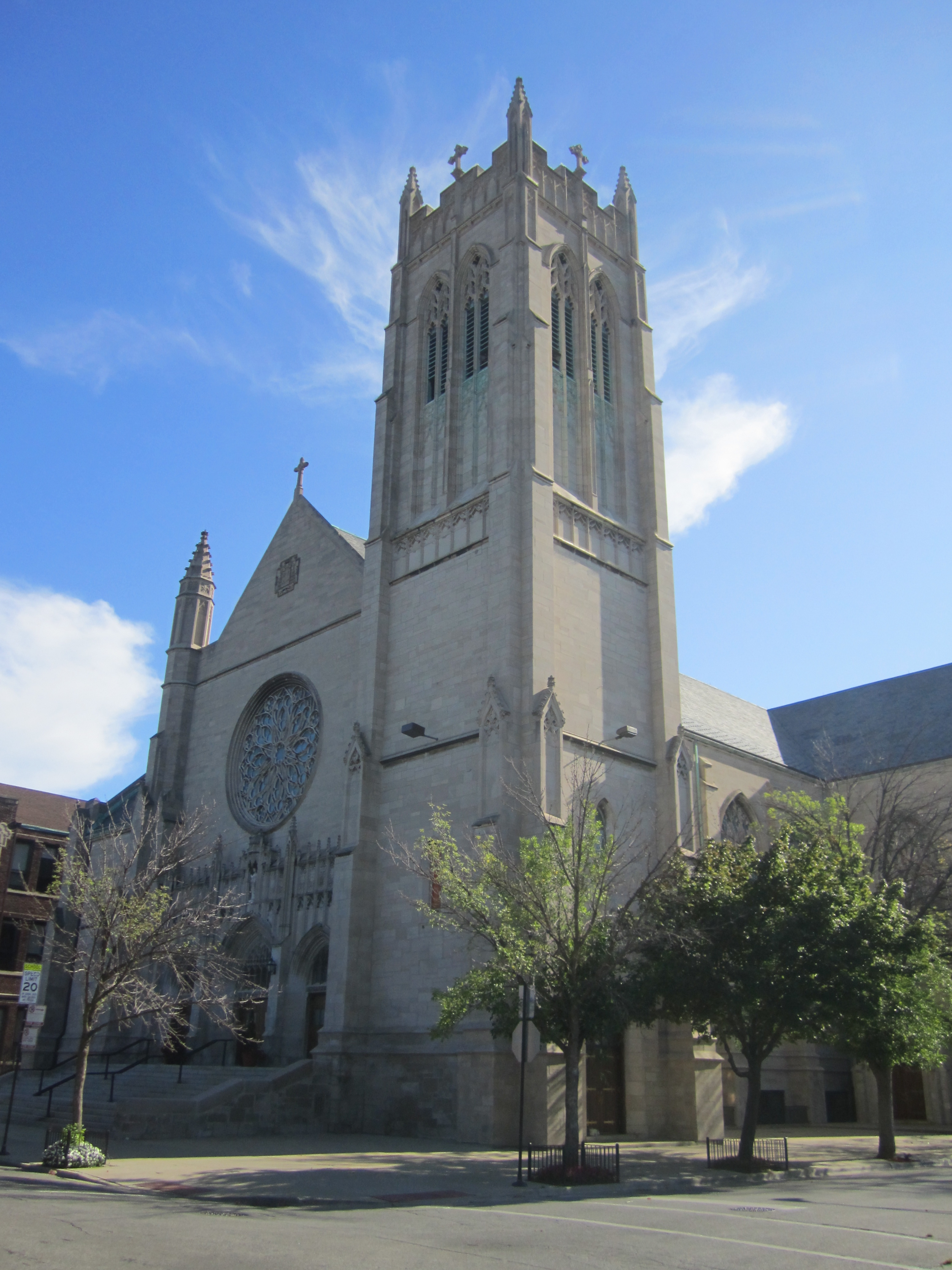
St. Sabina Church was dedicated in June 1933

St. Sabina Church is located in the community, headed by Rev. Michael Pfleger. The church and its priest have been pivotal in helping transform Auburn Gresham, with new housing and store fronts opening up in the neighborhood. One of the largest new single-family home developments in Chicago is nearly complete at W. 87th St. and S. Parnell Ave., in the southeast corner of Auburn Gresham.

Auburn Gresham is home to the St. Leo Campus for Veterans, which includes the Catholic Charities' St. Leo's Residence, the Auburn Gresham Community Based Outpatient Clinic, the St. Leo's Veteran's Garden, and the Pope John Paul II Residence.

The community is also home to Perspectives Leadership Academy and Perspectives Technology Academy which are a part of the Renaissance 2010 program. Both schools are housed in the same building that was home to the former Calumet High School in the Auburn Gresham community. Calumet High School was one of Chicago's oldest high schools opening its doors to Auburn Gresham neighborhood students in 1919.

The Auburn Gresham community is also home to the first urban SOS Children's Village in the U.S.

== Demographics ==
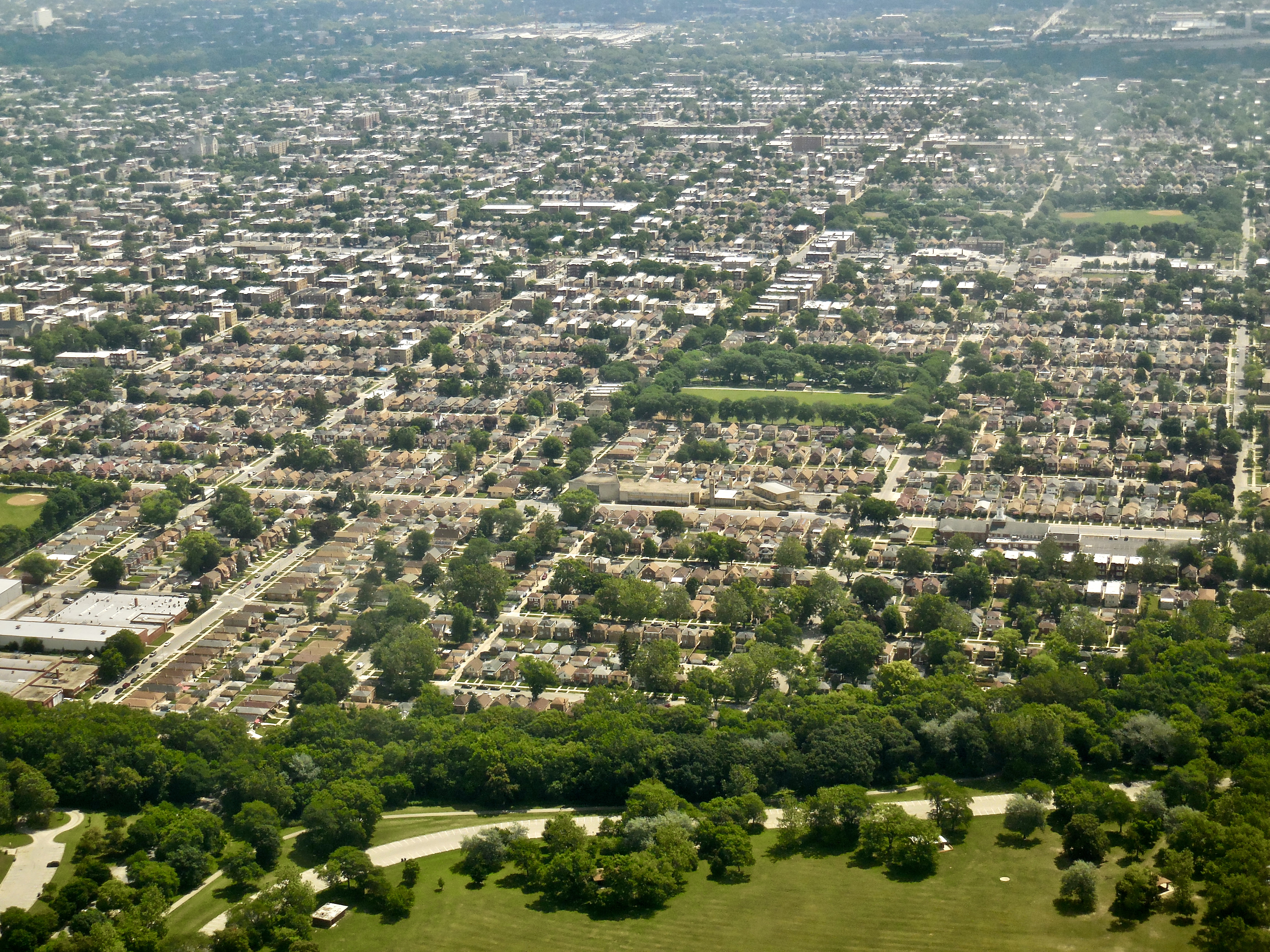
Aerial view of the neighborhood

Historical population
Census	Pop.	Note	%±
1920	19,558		—
1930	57,381		193.4%
1940	57,293		−0.2%
1950	60,978		6.4%
1960	59,484		−2.5%
1970	68,850		15.7%
1980	65,132		−5.4%
1990	59,808		−8.2%
2000	55,928		−6.5%
2010	48,743		−12.8%
2020	44,878		−7.9%

== Politics ==
The Auburn Gresham community area has supported the Democratic Party in the past two presidential elections. In the 2016 presidential election, the Auburn Gresham cast 19,286 votes for Hillary Clinton and cast 272 votes for Donald Trump (97.29% to 1.37%). In the 2012 presidential election, Auburn Gresham cast 24,782 votes for Barack Obama and cast 130 votes for Mitt Romney (99.34% to 0.52%).

== Notable people ==
- Philip K. Dick (1928–1982), science fiction writer. Dick was born at 7812 South Emerald Avenue.
- Michael Flatley (born 1958), an Irish step dancer. He grew up near 79th and Ashland.
- John Lyle (1920–2019), pilot and member of the Tuskegee Airmen. He was a resident of Auburn Gresham.
- Minyon Moore (born 1958), White House Political Director for President Bill Clinton. She was raised at West 78th Street and South Honore Street.
