= Gresham station =

Commuter rail station in Chicago, Illinois

Gresham

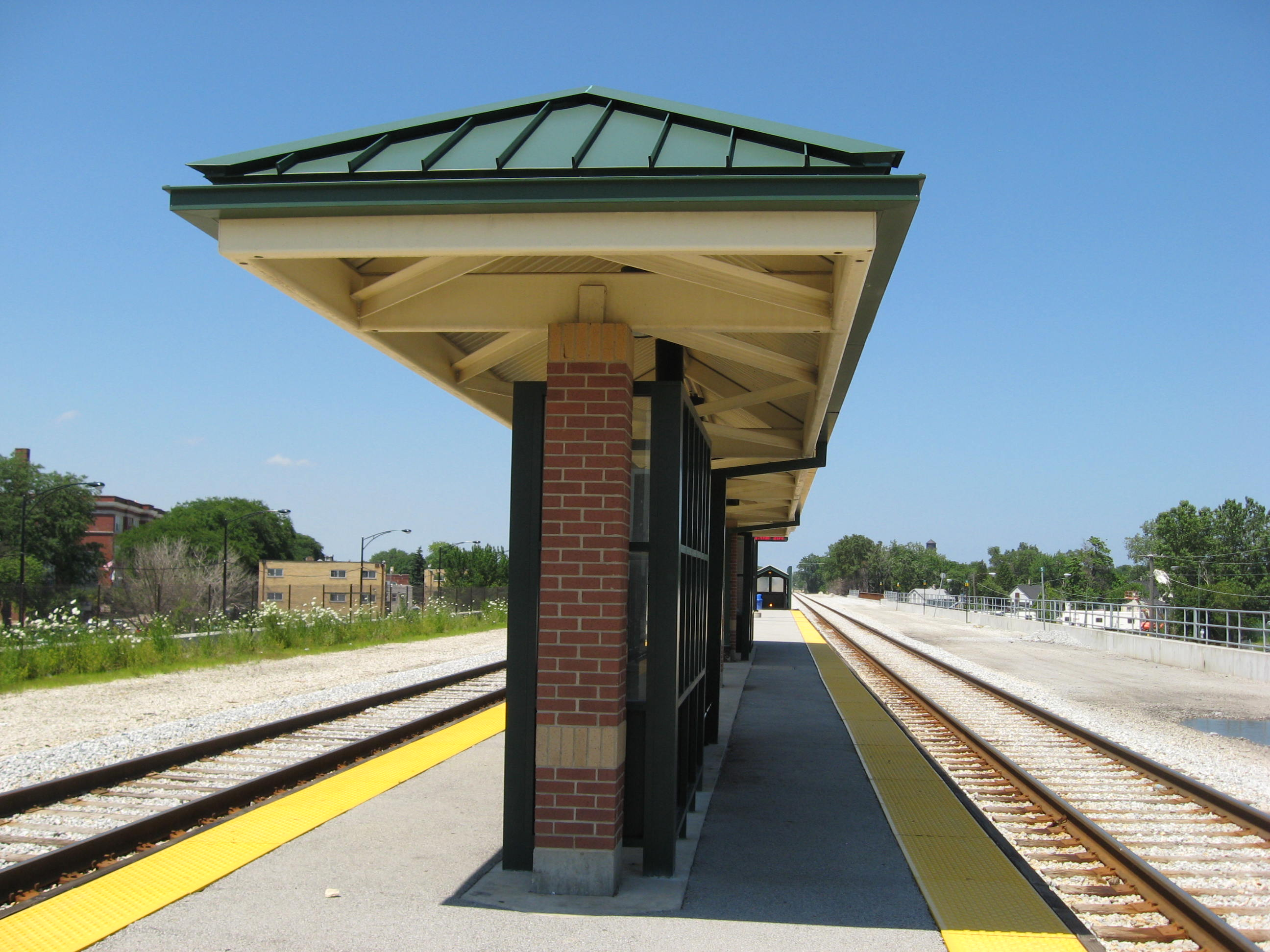
- Gresham station platform

General information
- Location: 820 West 87th Street; Auburn Gresham, Chicago, Illinois 60620
- Coordinates: 41.7372°N 87.6444°W
- Owner: Metra
- Line: Joliet Subdistrict
- Platforms: 1 island platform
- Tracks: 2
- Connections: CTA Buses

Construction
- Structure type: Elevated
- Accessible: No

Other information
- Fare zone: 2

Passengers
- 2018: 313 (average weekday) ▼1.6%
- Rank: 142 out of 236

Services
| Preceding station | Metra | Following station |
|---|---|---|
| Brainerd toward Joliet | Rock Island Beverly Branch | 35th Street toward LaSalle |
| 95th Street/Longwood toward Joliet | Rock Island | 35th Street toward LaSalle |
Former services
| Preceding station | Chicago, Rock Island and Pacific Railroad | Following station |
|---|---|---|
| Longwood Manor 95th Street toward Joliet | Suburban Service via Main Line | Auburn Park toward Chicago |
| Brainerd toward Joliet | Suburban Service via Beverly | Auburn Park toward Chicago |
Future services
| Preceding station | Metra | Following station |
|---|---|---|
| Brainerd toward Joliet | Rock Island Beverly Branch | Auburn Park Under construction toward LaSalle |
| 95th Street–Longwood Manor toward Joliet | Rock Island | Auburn Park Under construction toward LaSalle |
Track layout
Location

Gresham is a station on the Rock Island District Metra line, which runs between Joliet, Illinois and LaSalle Street Station in downtown Chicago, Illinois. It is in zone 2 according to Metra fee schedules based on its 9.8 miles (15.8 km) distance from downtown Chicago. As of 2018, Gresham is the 142nd busiest of Metra's 236 non-downtown stations, with an average of 313 weekday boardings. It is in the community area of Auburn Gresham, on the south side of Chicago. The Rock Island service splits just south of here; trains short-turning at Blue Island as well as evening service to and from Joliet diverge onto the slower Beverly Branch (via Brainerd), while most trains to and from points south of Blue Island remain on the main line.

As of 2026, Gresham is served by 34 inbound and 33 outbound trains on weekdays, and all 40 trains (20 in each direction) on weekends.

Gresham Station is built on an embankment between bridges over West 87th Street and Vincennes Avenue. Parking is mainly street-side, and there are parking lots on the corner of Vincennes Avenue and Halsted Street, and on Genoa Avenue between 88th and 87th Street.

== Bus connections ==
CTA

- 8A South Halsted
- 24 Wentworth (weekday only)
- 87 87th (Owl Service)
