= Auburn Park station =

Future commuter rail station in Chicago, Illinois

Auburn Park

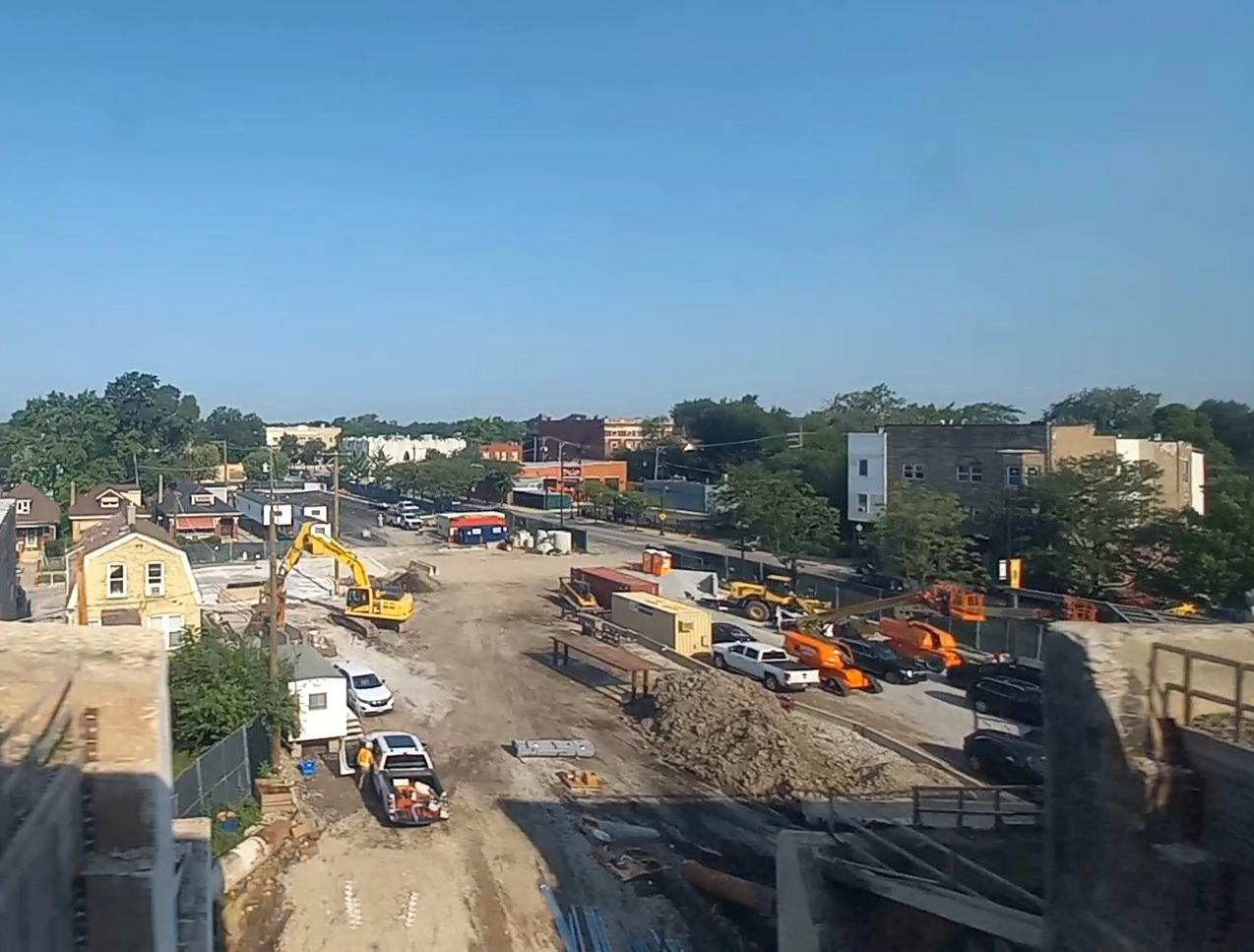
- Construction site at the future Auburn Park station in July 2024

General information
- Location: 79th Street; Chicago, Illinois; United States
- Coordinates: 41.7502°N 87.6402°W
- Owner: Metra
- Line: Rock Island District
- Tracks: 2

Construction
- Accessible: Yes

Other information
- Status: Under construction
- Fare zone: 2

History
- Opened: 1879 (Rock Island)
- Opening: 2027
- Closed: 1978 (Rock Island)
- Rebuilt: September 30, 2019

Future services
Preceding station	Metra	Following station
Gresham toward Joliet	Rock Island	35th Street toward LaSalle
Former services
Preceding station	Chicago, Rock Island and Pacific Railroad	Following station
Gresham toward Joliet	Suburban Service	Hamilton Park toward Chicago
Location

Auburn Park is an under-construction railroad station on the South Side of Chicago serving Metra's Rock Island District. It will be located on the southeast corner of 79th Street and South Lowe Avenue.

== History ==
The Chicago, Rock Island and Pacific Railroad operated an Auburn Park station at 78th Street from 1879 to 1978. After ridership dropped to 21 daily riders, the station was dropped from most train schedules in favor of increased service to the Oak Forest and Midlothian stations in the suburbs.

The Metra station was expected to begin construction after two state bonds were approved in 2009; however, budgeting issues delayed the release of funds. The ceremonial groundbreaking of the station was held on September 30, 2019. Construction began near the end of 2020 with the demolition of the vacant warehouse in favor of the station facility. Although the $35 million project was intended to last for three years, the project was delayed by a few years. In the meantime, another groundbreaking ceremony took place on June 22, 2022, for the construction of the station facility. The project also called for raising the bridge carrying Rock Island District trains, necessitating the closure of the entire line on August 29–30 and on November 13–14, 2026. Construction is expected to be finished in 2027.

== Bus connections ==
CTA

- 8A South Halsted
- 79 79th (Frequent Network & Owl Service)
