= Brainerd station =

Commuter rail station in Chicago, Illinois

Brainerd

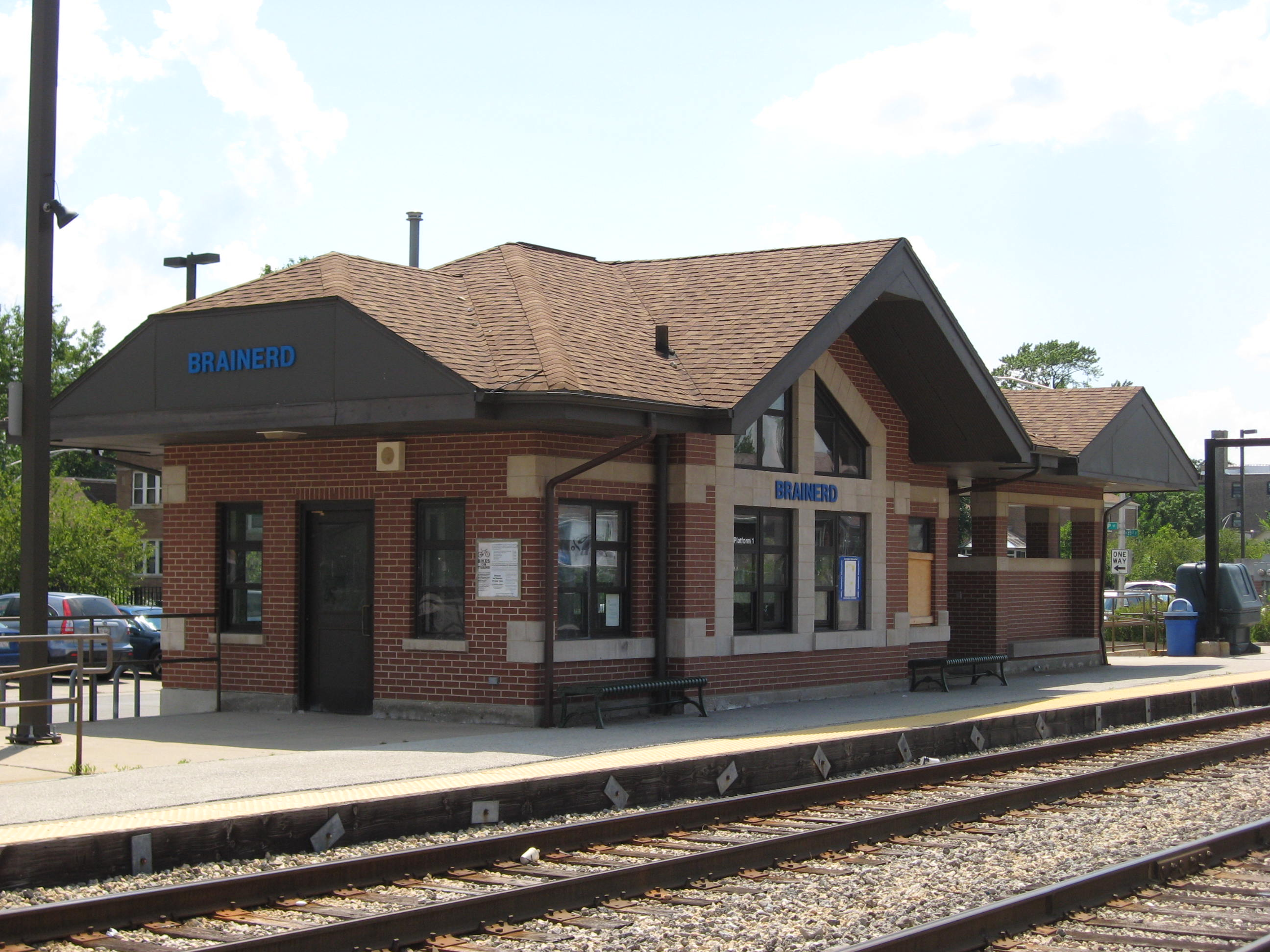
- Brainerd Metra station

General information
- Location: 8901 South Loomis Boulevard; Brainerd, Chicago, Illinois 60620
- Coordinates: 41.7321°N 87.6590°W
- Owner: Metra
- Line: Beverly Subdistrict
- Platforms: 2 side platforms
- Tracks: 2

Construction
- Parking: Yes
- Accessible: Yes

Other information
- Fare zone: 2

History
- Opened: 1999

Passengers
- 2018: 265 (average weekday) ▼12.5%
- Rank: 151 out of 236

Services
Preceding station	Metra	Following station
91st Street/Beverly Hills toward Joliet	Rock Island Beverly Branch	Gresham toward LaSalle
Former services
Preceding station	Chicago, Rock Island and Pacific Railroad	Following station
Beverly Hills 91st Street toward Joliet	Suburban Service via Beverly	Gresham toward Chicago
Track layout
Location

Brainerd is a station on Metra's Rock Island District line in the Washington Heights community area of Chicago, Illinois. The address is 8901 South Loomis Boulevard, but the station is actually in the middle of 89th Street from Loomis Boulevard to Bishop Street, 10.6 miles (17.1 km) from LaSalle Street Station, the northern terminus of the Rock Island District. In Metra's zone-based fare system, Brainerd is within zone 2. As of 2018, Brainerd is the 151st busiest of Metra's 236 non-downtown stations, with an average of 265 weekday boardings. It consists of two side platforms that serve two tracks. A shelter is available, but there is no ticket agent. Parking is available along the station on 89th Street.

As of 2022, Brainerd is served by 40 trains (20 in each direction) on weekdays, by 21 trains (10 inbound, 11 outbound) on Saturdays, and by 16 trains (eight in each direction) on Sundays and holidays.
