= Chicago Region Environmental and Transportation Efficiency Program =

Public-private rail improvement project

CREATE project status as of 2025

The Chicago Region Environmental and Transportation Efficiency (CREATE) Program is a $4.6 billion program to improve the efficiency and effectiveness of freight, commuter and intercity passenger rail and to reduce highway delay in the Chicago region. The Program consists of 70 projects, which includes constructing grade separations, flyovers and other rail projects to ease both rail and roadway congestion. The status of each of the 70 projects varies, with many having been completed, others in design or construction and some not yet started. Costs for the projects are covered by public and private funding from the Program's partners: the United States Department of Transportation, the Illinois Department of Transportation, Cook County, the City of Chicago, and public and private railroads (represented by the Association of American Railroads).

== History ==
The CREATE Program was formally announced on June 16, 2003. It began as a task force convened by the federal Surface Transportation Board in the early 2000s in recognition of the growing urgency of the Chicago region's rail capacity needs. That task force included representatives from the railroad industry, the State of Illinois and the City of Chicago.

Today, the CREATE Program is a unique collaboration whose members include railroads and municipal leaders working together to increase the efficiency of Chicago's unique rail network. Six of the seven Class 1 railroads operating in North America serve Chicago; each of those six is a CREATE partner alongside the State of Illinois, City of Chicago, and Cook County.

The CREATE Program is supported by public and private funding and enjoys widespread support from community, civic and elected leaders. Its work and operations are governed by a Joint Statement of Understandings that the partners developed, approved and regularly affirm.

== Purpose ==
Chicago is considered the railroad hub of North America. The region dominates the U.S. rail market in both market share and total volume, handling 47% of the nation's intermodal rail containers and 28% of rail cars, carrying a total of $641 billion worth of goods each year. Twenty-seven percent of all jobs in Cook County are freight-dependent industries that produce 56% of the county's economic output.

The Chicago region's rail infrastructure was largely configured to serve transportation needs and demands at the time it was originally built more than a century ago. By the 1990s, many decades of modernization and consolidation within the freight and passenger railroad industries had drastically changed the operational demands being placed on this network. Train lengths, routing patterns, capacity needs, rail-highway grade crossing conflicts and control technologies had all evolved over the years, but the region's rail infrastructure had not been sufficiently modernized to accommodate the new demands. This resulted in serious delays, which had cascading effects across the nation's rail network. Oftentimes, shared control of rail facilities within the Chicago region had created institutional challenges to implementing needed modernization. Under direction from the Surface Transportation Board and various elected officials and following several years of cooperative study and analysis by public agencies and private railroads, the CREATE Program was initiated in 2003 to identify, prioritize and address these infrastructure modernization needs. The closely related Chicago Transportation Coordination Office was also established at that time to address rail operations coordination needs in the region.

Because delays in the Chicago region's rail network can have impacts nationwide, the benefits to the CREATE Program also extend nationwide. A 2015 study showed that the economic benefits of full implementation of the CREATE Program are $31.5 billion.

== Projects ==
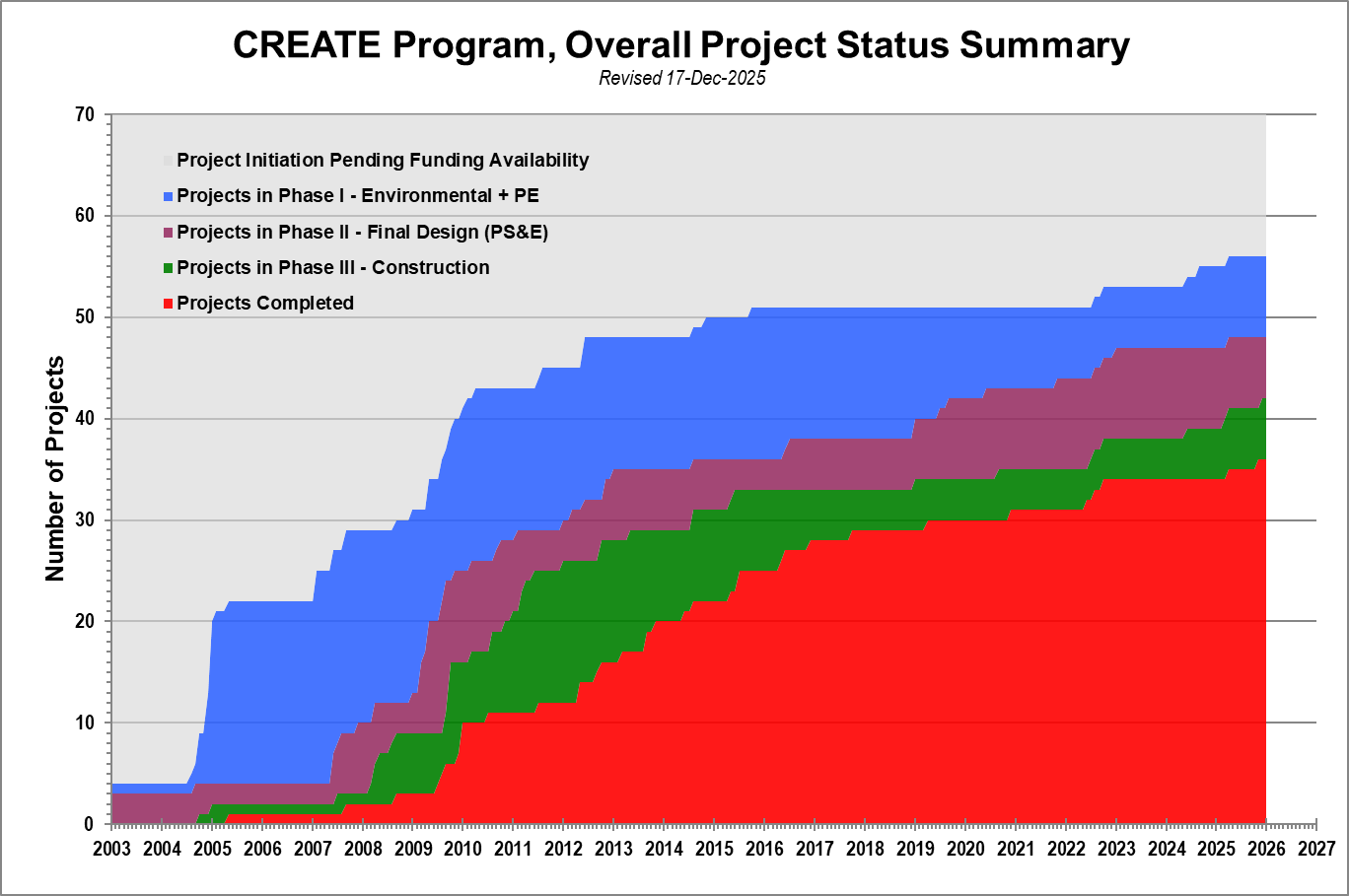
Project status as of 2025

The program currently comprises 70 separate projects. As of April 2025, a total of 35 had been fully completed, six were under construction, seven were in final design and another eight were in the preliminary design and environmental review process. The remaining 14 were awaiting identification of funding to enter preliminary design and environmental review.

=== Major projects ===
==== 75th Street Corridor Improvement Project ====
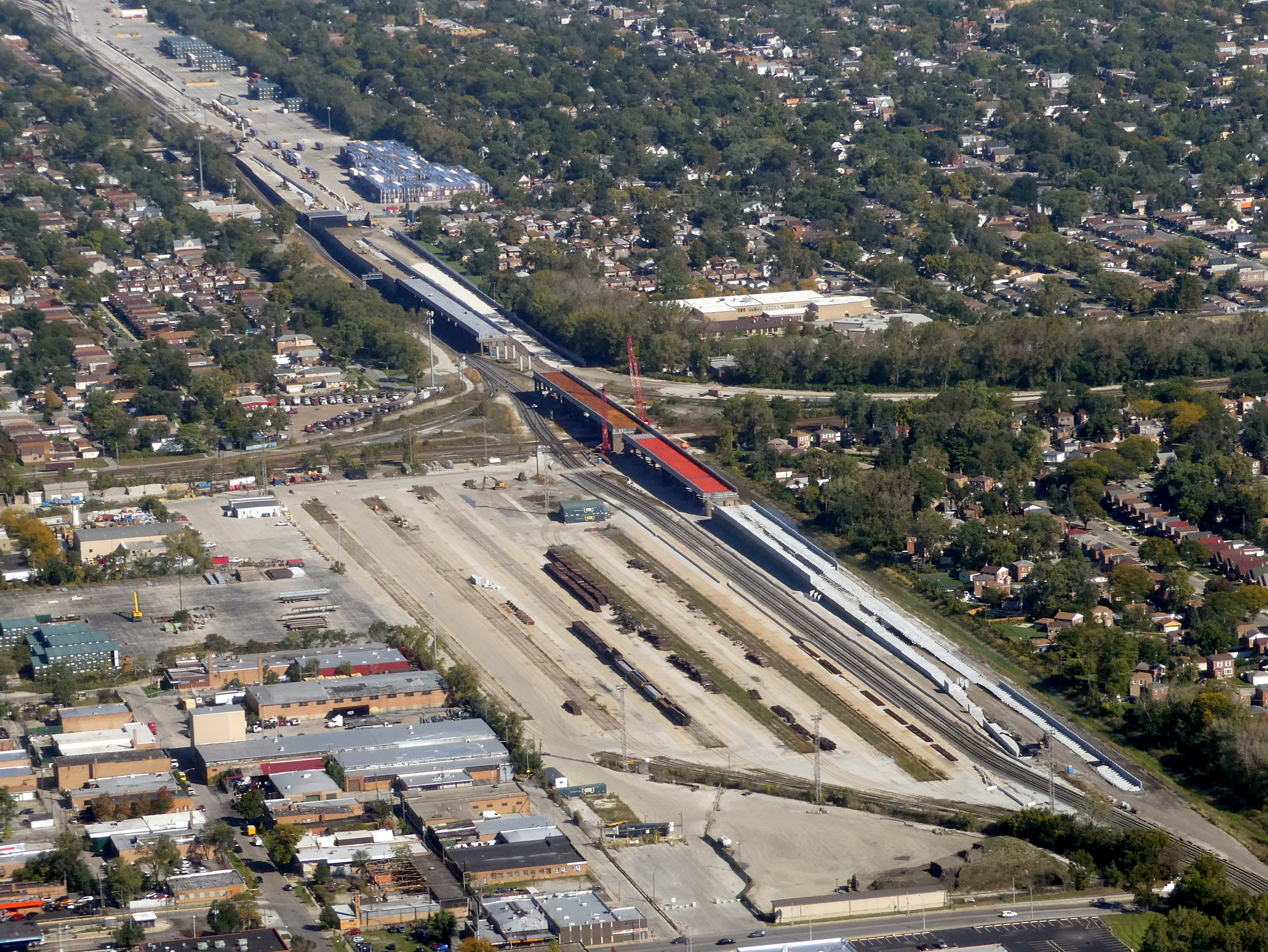
Forest Hill Flyover under construction in 2024

The 75th Street Corridor Improvement Project (75th St. CIP) is the largest project in the CREATE Program. The project is located in the Chicago neighborhoods of Ashburn, Englewood, Auburn Gresham and West Chatham along two passenger and four freight rail lines. It will eliminate the most congested rail chokepoint in the Chicago region, Belt Junction, where 30 Metra and 90 freight trains per day cross each other's paths. It is broken out into four projects:

- Forest Hill Flyover (CREATE project P3)
  - This project consists of a new CSX north–south rail flyover structure to eliminate conflicts between north–south and east–west train movements at Forest Hill Junction (75th Street and Western Avenue). Final design (Phase II) began in 2019 and is expected to last through 2021. Construction (Phase III) began at the end of 2020 and will continue through 2024.
- 71st Street Grade Separation (CREATE project GS19)
  - This project consists of a road-rail grade separation of 71st Street and the CSX railroad tracks near Bell Avenue. Final design (Phase II) work began in 2019. Construction (Phase III) began in 2022.
- Rock Island Connection (CREATE project P2)
  - This project will build a flyover structure to connect the Metra SouthWest Service (SWS) mainline tracks to the Metra Rock Island Line. Final design (Phase II) work began in 2020 and is expected to continue until 2022. CREATE Program partners are seeking construction (Phase III) funding for this project. The improvements will allow Metra to route all SWS trains to the LaSalle Street Station rather than Union Station, which will free up valuable capacity at Union Station for increased service on other passenger and/or commuter rail lines there.
- 80th Street Junction and Belt Junction Replacements (CREATE project EW2)
  - This project will reconfigure the east–west tracks at Forest Hill Junction (near 75th Street and Western Avenue), add and realign tracks to remove the bottleneck at Belt Junction (near 75th Street and Loomis Avenue), realign track and signal systems between Belt Junction and the Dan Ryan (Interstate 94) Expressway, reconstruct 80th Street Junction (near 80th Street and Wallace Street), relocate Union Pacific tracks to a currently unused Norfolk Southern alignment and add positive train control (PTC) along this stretch of tracks. EW2 also includes a new Metra mainline track and improvements to several existing railroad viaducts over city streets. Final design (Phase II) work began in 2020 and is expected to continue until 2022. CREATE Program partners are seeking construction (Phase III) funding for this project.

==== Englewood Flyover ====
The Englewood Flyover (CREATE project P1), completed July 2016, eliminated conflict between 78 Metra Rock Island trains and approximately 60 freight and Amtrak trains that previously crossed at grade through the Englewood interlocking daily. The $140 million project relieved a significant source of delay for Amtrak trains from Michigan and points east, as well as for NS freight trains. By eliminating many of these delays, the project reduced locomotive engine idling, resulting in reduced emissions and improved air quality. P1's completion was needed before two adjacent CREATE projects could progress, as they would add additional trains to the lines at the Englewood Flyover location. Without the Englewood Flyover in place first, implementation of these other projects would have greatly increased delays at the Englewood interlocking.

== Funding ==
The CREATE Program is a public-private partnership currently estimated to cost $4.6 billion to fully implement. Funding commitments come from the Program's partners and include a mix of public and private funds. The Program has received $1.6 billion from a variety of public and private commitments so far. An estimated $3 billion is needed to complete the full Program of projects. From 1998 to 2018, the private railroads invested $6.9 billion in the Chicago Terminal beyond CREATE Program investments. Currently, these railroads invest about $450 million per year in the Chicago Terminal beyond CREATE investments.
