= 103rd Street/Washington Heights station =

Commuter rail station in Chicago, Illinois

103rd Street Washington Heights

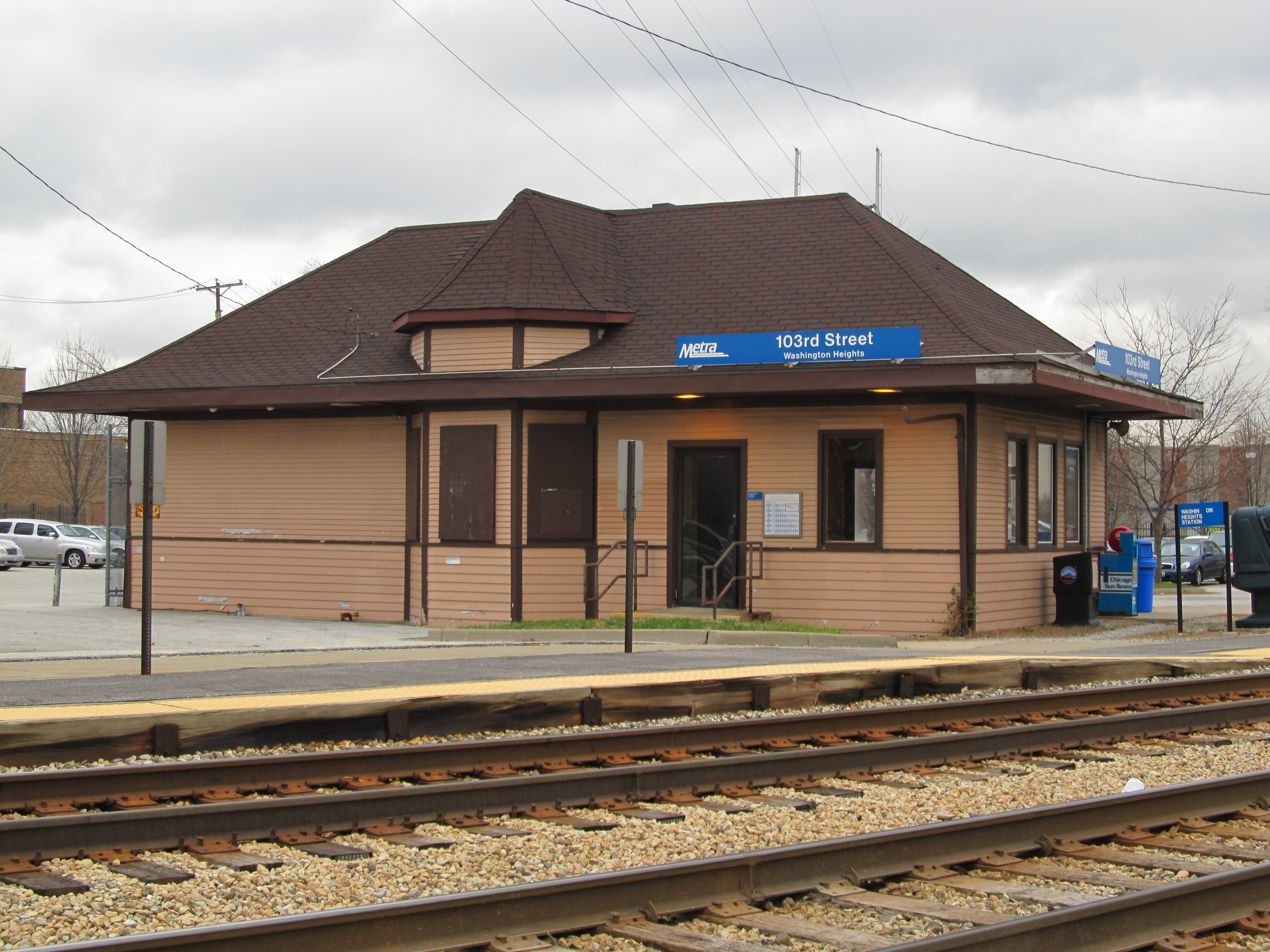

General information
- Location: 10335 South Vincennes Avenue; Washington Heights, Chicago, Illinois 60643
- Coordinates: 41.7056°N 87.6560°W
- Line: Joliet Subdistrict
- Platforms: 1 side platform
- Tracks: 2
- Connections: CTA Buses

Construction
- Parking: Yes; Vendors
- Accessible: Yes

Other information
- Fare zone: 2

Passengers
- 2018: 101 (average weekday) ▼5.6%
- Rank: 187 out of 236

Services
Preceding station	Metra	Following station
Blue Island/Vermont Street toward Joliet	Rock Island	95th Street/Longwood toward LaSalle
Former services
Preceding station	Metra	Following station
Givins closed 1984 toward Joliet	Rock Island Rush hour only	99th Street–Longwood closed 1985 toward LaSalle
Preceding station	Chicago, Rock Island and Pacific Railroad	Following station
Blue Island toward Colorado Springs	Main Line	Englewood toward Chicago
Givins toward Joliet	Suburban Service via Main Line	Longwood Manor 99th Street toward Chicago
Track layout
Location

103rd Street/Washington Heights station is a commuter railroad station on Metra's Rock Island District line in the Washington Heights neighborhood of Chicago, Illinois, 12.0 miles (19.3 km) from LaSalle Street Station, the northern terminus of the line. In Metra's zone-based fare system, 103rd Street/Washington Heights is in zone 2. As of 2018, 103rd Street–Washington Heights is the 187th busiest of Metra's 236 non-downtown stations, with an average of 101 weekday boardings.

As of June 2026, 103rd Street/Washington Heights is served by 17 trains (18 inbound, 19 outbound) on weekdays and 19 trains (10 inbound, 9 outbound) on weekends and holidays.

Parking is available from 104th Street and Throop Street off 105th Street, along the right of way of the former Pennsylvania Railroad "Panhandle Line." Bus connections are provided by the CTA.

== Tracks ==
There are two tracks at 103rd Street–Washington Heights. Trains from Chicago run on track 2 (the west track) and trains to Chicago run on track 1 (the east track.)

== Bus connections ==
CTA

- 9 Ashland
- 103 West 103rd
- 112 Vincennes/111th
