= Roseland, Chicago =

Community area in Chicago, Illinois

Roseland
- Community area
- Community Area 49 - Roseland
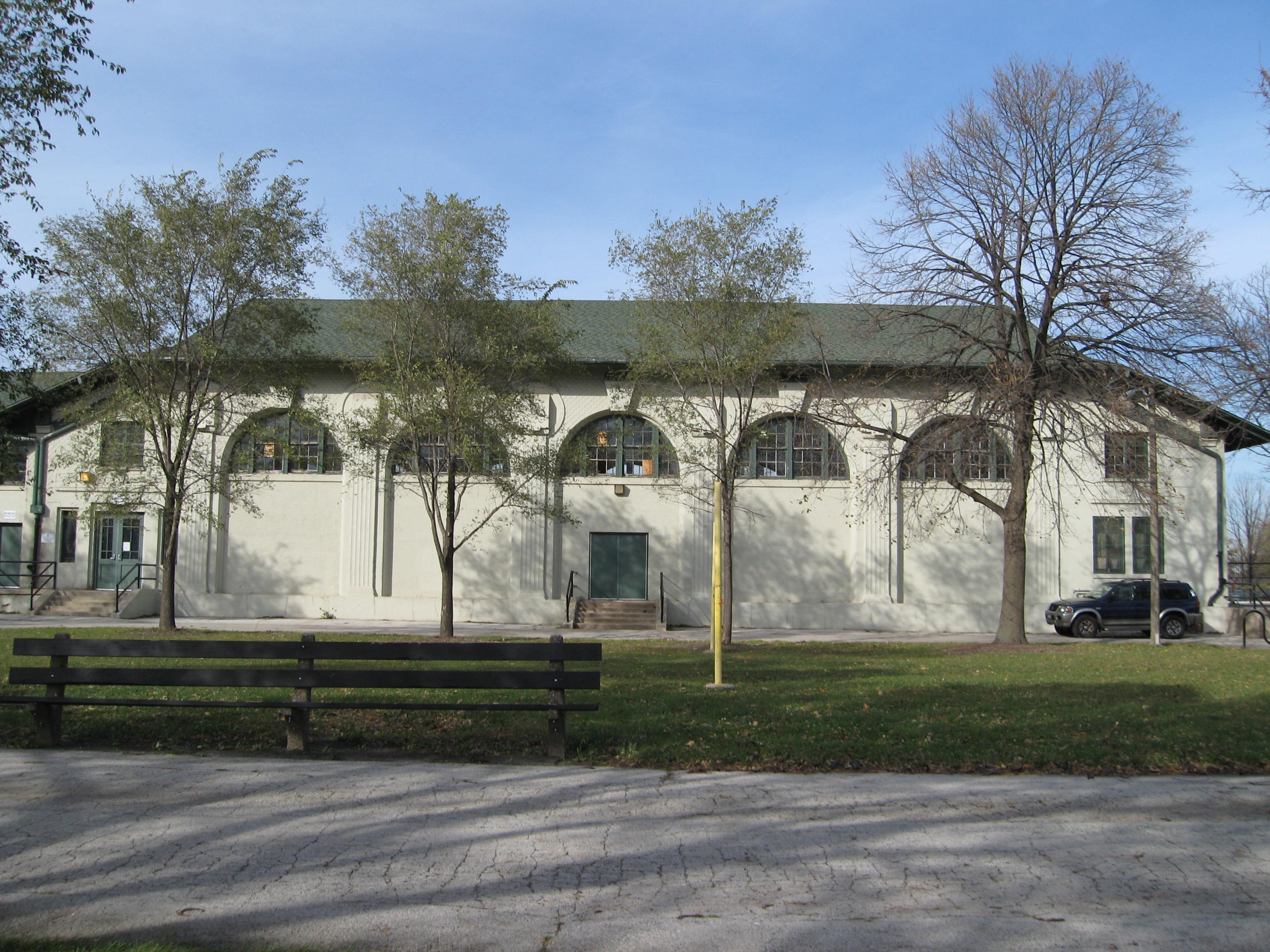
- Palmer Park Fieldhouse

- Location within the city of Chicago
- Coordinates: 41°42.6′N 87°37.2′W
- Country: United States
- State: Illinois
- County: Cook
- City: Chicago
- Neighborhoods: list: Fernwood; Lilydale; Princeton Park; Roseland; West Chesterfield (portion)

Area
  - Total: 4.86 sq mi (12.58 km^{2})

Population (2024)
  - Total: 36,635
  - Density: 7,542/sq mi (2,912/km^{2})

Demographics 2024
  - White: 2.0%
  - Black: 91.8%
  - Hispanic: 3.1%
  - Asian: 0.5%
  - Other: 2.6%

Educational Attainment 2024
  - High School Diploma or Higher: 88.0%
  - Bachelor's Degree or Higher: 23.2%
- Time zone: UTC-6 (CST)
  - Summer (DST): UTC-5 (CDT)
- ZIP Codes: parts of 60619, 60620, 60628
- Median household income: $37,242
- Source: U.S. Census, Record Information Services

Roseland is one of the 77 official community areas of Chicago, Illinois, on the far south side of the city. It includes the neighborhoods of Fernwood, Princeton Park, Lilydale, the southern portion of West Chesterfield, Rosemoor, Sheldon Heights and West Roseland.

== History ==
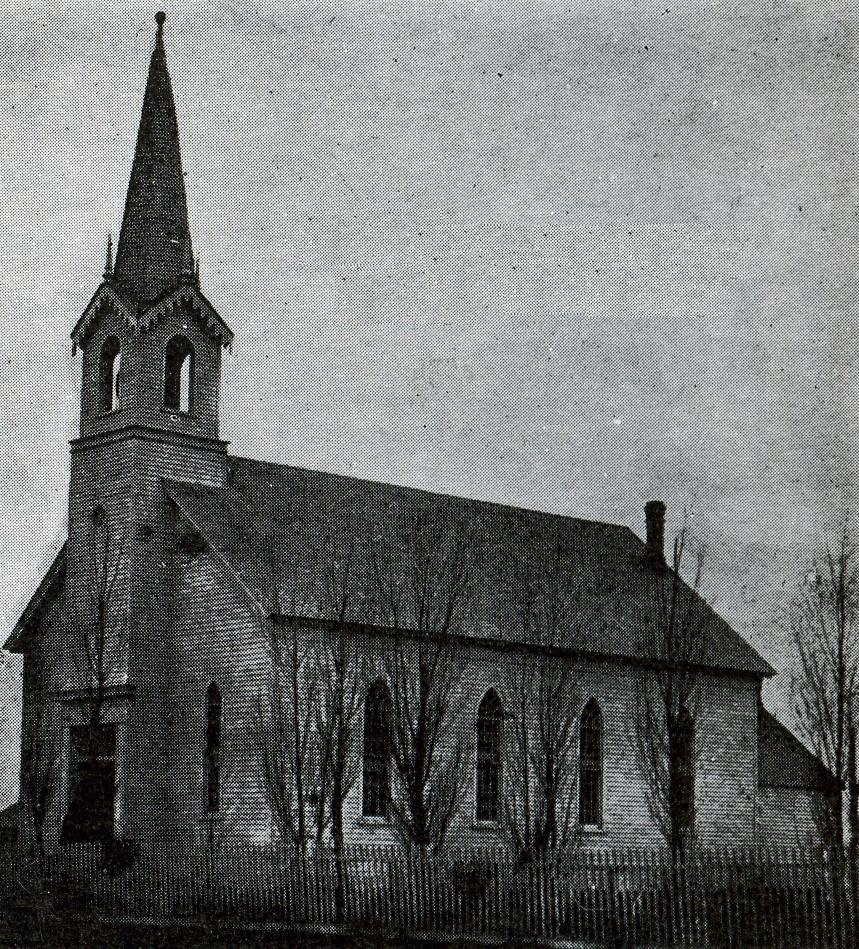
First Reformed Church of Roseland was founded by the Dutch immigrant population

Roseland was settled in the 1840s by Dutch immigrants, who called the area "de Hooge Prairie", the High Prairie, because it was built on higher, drier ground than the earlier Dutch settlement several miles further south of the Little Calumet River, which was called "de Laage Prairie", the Low Prairie, now South Holland, Illinois.

The community was entirely agrarian until the late 19th century, when the town of Pullman, Chicago was built between Roseland and Lake Calumet. George M. Pullman planned a model industrial city built around a factory that manufactured his "Palace" railway coaches. Modern brick homes were built with electricity, plumbing and gas utilities. Skilled tradesmen from all over Europe immigrated to the town of Pullman with many settling in nearby Roseland. The Pullman Freight Car Works was built in the 1900s decade on 103rd Street, and survives to this day as a distribution center for flat-rolled steel.

Roseland was annexed into Chicago in 1892. The Roseland area became a very cosmopolitan community made up of multi cultural, ethnic and racial backgrounds. There was a large population of Italian Americans just east of Roseland in the Kensington community. While some Italians of southern Italian origins came to the area from the Little Italy neighborhood on Taylor Street, many other Italians who settled in the area came from the northern Italian regions of Piedmont, Tuscany, and the Veneto. All these Italians from varied regions of Italy helped to make the Kensington area, and the wider Roseland area, centers of South Side Italian life. Sant' Antonio di Padua (St. Anthony's) Church (built 1903) and its grammar school were key religious and cultural landmarks of the area. Supporting businesses flourished rapidly changing the farmland into commercial and residential communities surrounded by a number of industries. Stores on Michigan Avenue served the entire south side of Chicago.

Fortunes began to change in the 1960s when industry patterns led to economic decline. Steel mills to the east were shuttered. Pullman scaled back production and eventually closed for good in 1981. The huge Sherwin-Williams paint factory closed for good in 1995. A period of rapid ethnic succession took place.

The much lauded mural "I Welcome Myself to a New Place: Roseland Pullman Mural," by Olivia Gude, Jon Pounds, and Marcus Jefferson, 1988, was designed to unite the predominantly African American community of Roseland with its nearest neighbor, the predominantly white Pullman community.

== Neighborhoods ==
=== Fernwood ===
Fernwood lies on the western edge of Roseland, between 99th and 103rd Streets. It was considered an "upscale" neighborhood of Roseland and extended west into the Washington Heights community up to Halsted Street. Sometimes referred to as West Roseland, it was incorporated in 1883. The area was known for a gardenlike parkway between 95th and 103rd Streets along Eggelston that was known as Fernwood Parkway.

The area is noted for one of the worst race riots in Chicago history. In mid August 1947, several black veterans and their families moved into the CHA Fernwood Park Housing Project at 104th and Halsted. Area residents viewed this as one of several attempts by the CHA to initiate racial integration into white communities. A violent mob action resulted which lasted for three days and mobilized over 1,000 law enforcement officers to control.

During the 1950s and 1960s the community witnessed the combined effects of blockbusting by unscrupulous real estate agents and the ensuing white flight resulting in complete ethnic transition. Like the surrounding communities of Roseland and Washington Heights, Fernwood Park remains predominantly African-American.

=== Lilydale ===
Lilydale is a small enclave of modest homes in the northwest corner of Roseland. In the 1920s and 1930s the thinly populated area was referred to as little more than a "cabbage patch". It consisted of mostly vacant land between 91st and 95th Streets and between State Street and the Chicago & Eastern Illinois Railroad tracks (then, the Chicago and Western Indiana Railroad). The 1940s saw a peak in the Second Migration of Black workers from the South seeking jobs and a better life in the industrialized North. Affordable housing for Blacks was limited and generally restricted to the "Black Belt" on the south side of Chicago. Housing shortages grew more severe with the onset of World War II as defense workers moved into the city to aid the war effort.

Lilydale became an attractive area due to its proximity to the steel mills and other defense industries on the south side. It was centrally located and convenient to railroads and streetcars. Beginning in 1942, Black contractors Matthew Goodwin and "Duke" Hodges began building simple, low cost single family homes and duplexes for a growing working-class black neighborhood. To Black trades workers, Lilydale represented an all-too-rare opportunity to use their skills and help resolve their own housing problem. While the homes were modest, they were made of brick and many still stand today. They were originally intended to be rented to defense workers and sold to veterans after the War. The homes were dramatically more affordable than similar homes in the area making them attractive to workers and veterans alike.

Today, only about 12 city blocks remain of the original settlement and the area is generally referred to as a part of Princeton Park.

=== Princeton Park ===
Princeton Park is a community of single-family homes built in 1944 and is located in the northwest corner of the Roseland community area in Chicago. Originally, it was a subdivision of low cost multi-family row houses between 91st and 95th streets and Wentworth and Harvard streets. The eastern boundary later extended to State Street (now the Dan Ryan Expressway). This area includes single-family homes, classic bungalows, that were part of the Lilydale community.

Donald O'Toole

The project was the creation of banker/real estate developer Donald O'Toole. The land had previously been used for farming by the primarily Dutch settlers in the Roseland area. In the early 1900s, Roseland transitioned from a farming community to an urban residential neighborhood. As one of the last remaining open spaces it was primed for development. The low cost housing was marketed exclusively to the African-American community making it the first established black community in Roseland. It remains a segregated African-American community today. Once established, Princeton Park was on the leading edge of the ensuing "panic peddling" that engulfed Roseland. Unscrupulous realtors used scare tactics such as blockbusting to frighten and intimidate white residents; churning the real estate market for quick profits. As suburban housing and commuting became more accessible in the 1960s and 1970s, middle class whites left the Roseland area resulting in a total ethnic transformation.

== Politics ==
Roseland is a stronghold for the Democratic Party. In the 2016 presidential election, Roseland cast 20,042 votes for Hillary Clinton and cast 316 votes for Donald Trump. In the 2012 presidential election, Roseland cast 24,400 votes for Barack Obama and cast 132 votes for Mitt Romney.

== Transportation ==
Train service in the community area is provided by Metra. The Metra Electric District's Main Line runs along the Roseland community area's border with the Pullman community area with stations at 95th Street, 103rd Street, 107th Street, 111th Street, and 115th Street.

The 95th/Dan Ryan station, a terminal station of the Chicago "L" Red Line, is located in Roseland. Red Ahead, a program to extend the Red Line south to 130th Street, would result in new stations in Roseland at 103rd Street and 111th Street. In 2025, it was estimated that this project will begin construction in 2026 and will be completed in 2030.

== Education ==
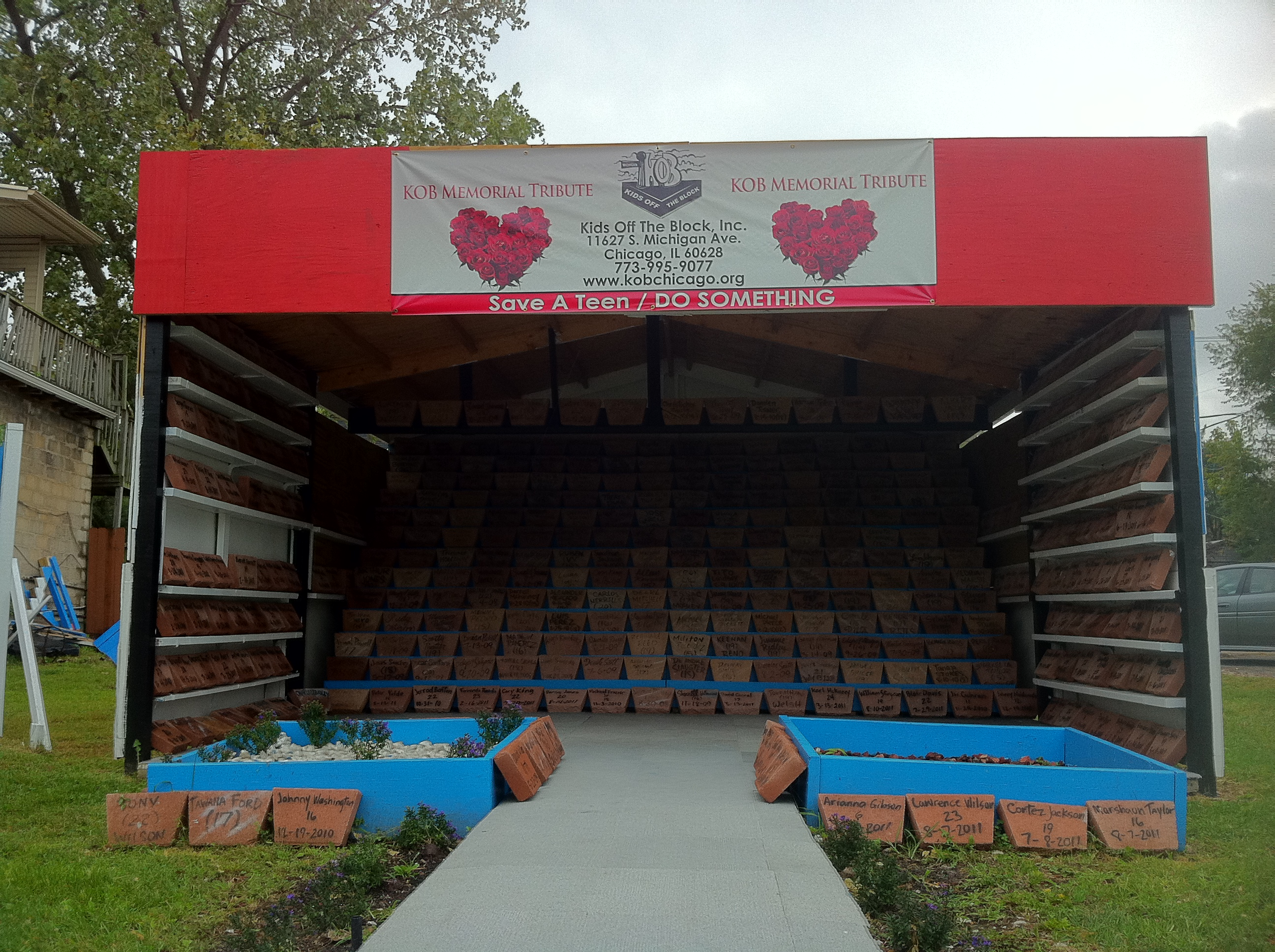
The Kids off the Block memorial featuring hundreds of stones, one for each person killed by gun violence in Roseland

Chicago Public Schools operates public schools in Roseland.

K-8 schools in Roseland and serving sections of Roseland include Bennett, Cullen, Curtis, Scanlon, Dunne, Frank L. Gillespie, Alex Haley Academy, L. Hughes, Kohn, and Lavizzo.

K-8 Schools outside of Roseland and serving sections of Roseland include Evers, Fernwood, Pullman, Ryder, and Smith.

Three high schools, Fenger High School, Gwendolyn Brooks College Preparatory Academy and Harlan Community Academy High School, are located in Roseland and serve Roseland. Some Roseland residents are zoned to Corliss High School in Pullman, while others are zoned to Julian High School in Washington Heights.

Chicago Collegiate Charter School, opened in 2013, serves students in Roseland. Harlan Academic Center and Turner-Drew, K-8 magnets, are in Roseland. Gwendolyn Brooks College Preparatory Academy, a magnet school, is located in Roseland.

Roseland Christian School, a private school, is in Roseland.

The main campus of Chicago State University at 95th and Martin Luther King Drive, is in the northeast portion of Roseland.

== Population ==
Historical population
Census	Pop.	Note	%±
1930	43,206		—
1940	44,009		1.9%
1950	56,705		28.8%
1960	58,750		3.6%
1970	62,716		6.8%
1980	64,372		2.6%
1990	56,493		−12.2%
2000	52,683		−6.7%
2010	44,619		−15.3%
2020	38,816		−13.0%

== Crime ==
Roseland is one of the deadliest neighborhoods in Chicago, despite stepped-up efforts by City Hall to curb gang violence.

Roseland had 26 shooting deaths in 2021, an increase from the previous year according to Chicago Sun-Times data.

== Notable people ==
- Anthony Beale (born 1967), member of the Chicago City Council. Beale was raised in Roseland and represents it as 9th Ward Alderman.
- J. Quinn Brisben (1934–2012), teacher, activist, and nominee of the Socialist Party USA in the 1992 United States presidential election. He was a resident of the Roseland neighborhood.
- Dick Butkus (1942–2023), football player. He was raised in Roseland.
- Deon Cole (born 1972), actor, comedian and screenwriter. He was a childhood resident of Roseland.
- Frederic R. DeYoung (1875–1934), Justice of the Supreme Court of Illinois. He was a childhood resident of Roseland prior to its annexation into the City of Chicago.
- Dennis DeYoung, Chuck Panozzo, and John Panozzo of the band Styx. The three began playing music in their teen years while living in Roseland, and in 1973 released a song called Earl of Roseland.
- Wilson Frost (1925–2018), member of the Chicago City Council from 1967 to 1987. He resided at 10816 South Parnell Avenue for a time.
- Howard Griffith, football player
- Larry Hoover (born 1950), criminal and founder of the Gangster Disciples. He lived at East 104th Street at the time of his arrest and sentencing for the murder of William Young.
- Anthony L. Krotiak (1915–1945), Private First Class in the United States Marine Corps and recipient of the Medal of Honor. He was raised in Roseland at 10733 South LaSalle Street.
- James Meeks (born 1956), pastor and former member of the Illinois Senate (2003–2013). He is a resident of Roseland.
- Eliot Ness (1903–1957) noted Prohibition Agent of the famed "Untouchables" in Chicago. He was raised in Roseland.
- Milton L. Olive III (1946–1965), Private first class in the United States Army during the Vietnam War and posthumous recipient of the Medal of Honor. Olive-Harvey College is named for him and Carmel Bernon Harvey Jr. He lived in Roseland.
- Robert Sandifer (1983–1994), a Black Disciples gang member killed in 1994 at eleven years of age
- Robert Shaw (born 1937), former member of the Chicago City Council and former commissioner of the Cook County Board of Review, formerly lived in Roseland
- Ralph Stob former president of Calvin College in Grand Rapids, Michigan.
- Arthur Swanson (1926–2010), member of the Illinois Senate from 1963 until 1971. He was a childhood resident of Roseland and represented it during his political career.
- Ernest Terrell (1939–2014), professional boxer and 25th Heavyweight Boxing Champion (1965–1967). He resided at 11136 S. Parnell Ave. for a time.
- John Ton (1826–1896), abolitionist. He was a longtime resident of what is now Roseland and resided at 316 West 103rd Street from 1893 until his death in 1896.
- Paul Vallas (born 1953), first chief executive officer of the Chicago Public School system and candidate for the Democratic Party's nomination for governor in 2002. He was raised in Roseland.
- Robert Zemeckis (born 1952), film director whose credits include Back to the Future, Who Framed Roger Rabbit and Forrest Gump. He was raised in Roseland. The address 11344 Edbrooke mentioned in the film "The Polar Express" is the actual address where Zemeckis grew up.
