= 103rd Street/Rosemoor station =

Commuter rail station in Chicago, Illinois

103rd Street/Rosemoor

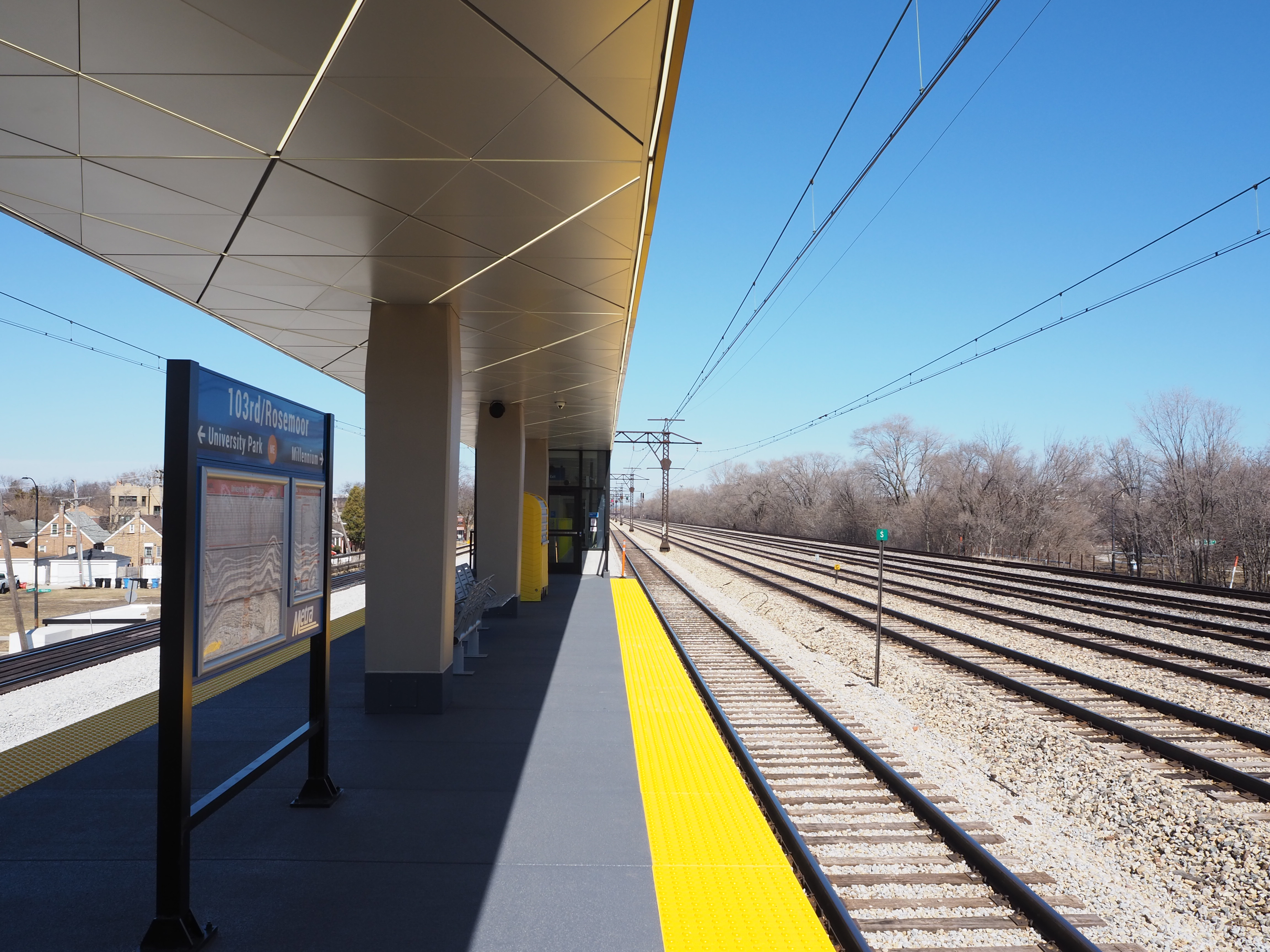
- 103rd Street–Rosemoor station in March 2025.

General information
- Location: 103rd Street and Cottage Grove Avenue; Rosemoor, Chicago, Illinois
- Coordinates: 41.7068°N 87.6073°W
- Owner: Metra
- Line: University Park Sub District
- Platforms: 1 island platform
- Tracks: 4
- Connections: CTA Buses

Construction
- Parking: No
- Accessible: Yes

Other information
- Fare zone: 2

History
- Rebuilt: 2023–2025
- Electrified: 1926

Passengers
- 2018: 36 (average weekday) ▼2.7%
- Rank: 217 out of 236

Services
Preceding station	Metra	Following station
107th Street toward University Park or Blue Island	Metra Electric Main Line & Blue Island Branch	95th Street/CSU toward Millennium
Former services
Preceding station	Illinois Central Railroad	Following station
107th Street toward Richton or Blue Island	Electric Suburban Main Line & Blue Island Branch	95th Street toward Randolph Street
Track layout
Location

103rd Street/Rosemoor is a commuter rail station along Metra Electric's main line in the Rosemoor neighborhood of Chicago. It is located at 103rd Street and Cottage Grove Avenue, and is 13.1 miles (21.1 km) away from the northern terminus at Millennium Station. In Metra's zone-based fare system, 103rd Street (Rosemoor) is in zone 2. As of 2018, the station is the 217th busiest of Metra's 236 non-downtown stations, with an average of 36 weekday boardings.

The station shares part of its name with two other stations on the Rock Island District line to the west. The first is on the main line in Washington Heights, and the other is on the Beverly Branch (or "Suburban Line") in the Beverly neighborhood of Chicago to the west. This 103rd Station is the nearest Metra Electric station to Gately Stadium, which is used both by high school and Chicago State University athletic teams. Although Metra gives the address as 103rd Street & Cottage Grove Avenue, parking areas are located on 103rd Street and Dauphin Avenue.

== History ==
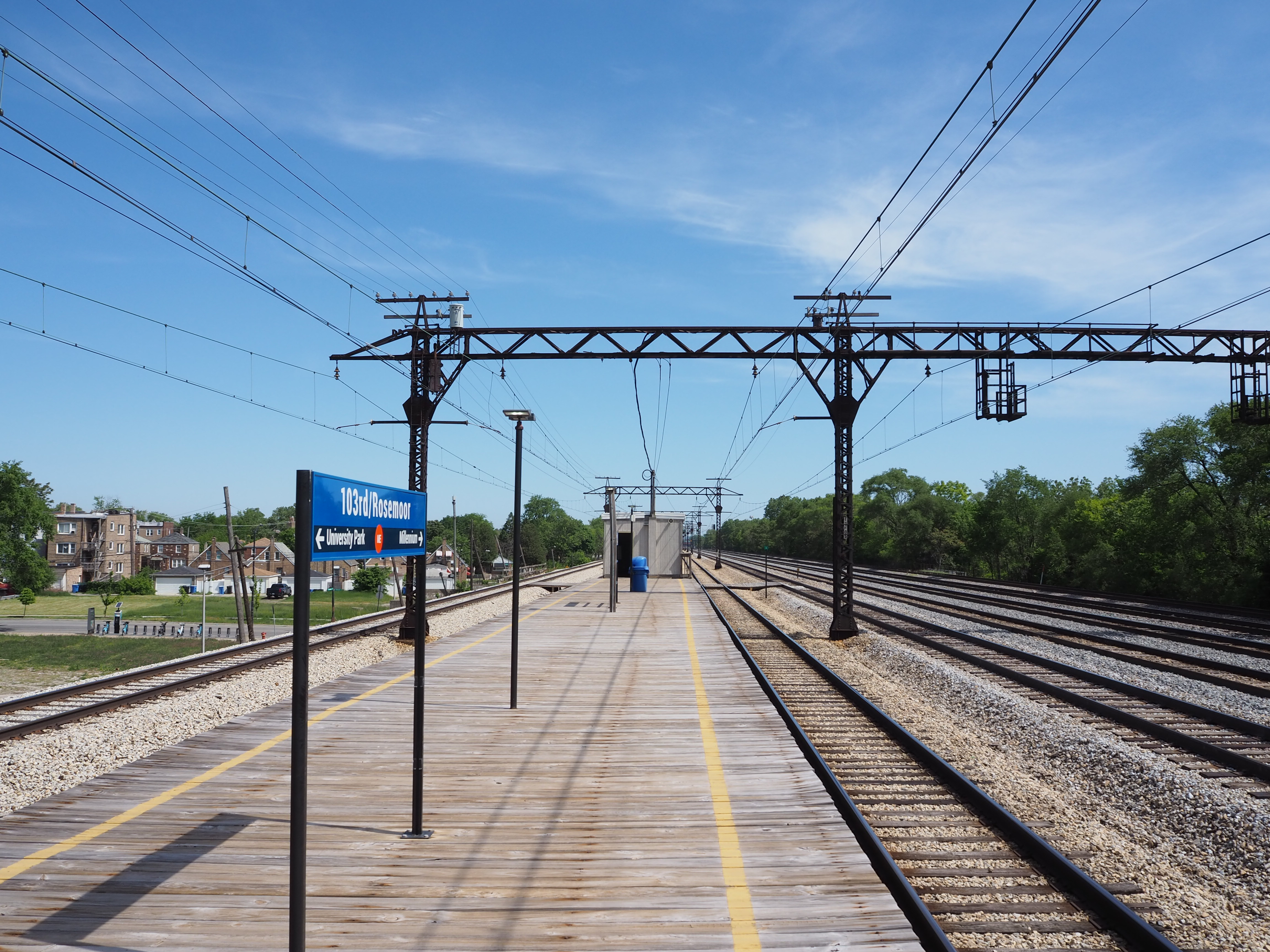
Station platform before construction

The station was temporarily closed on November 20, 2023, for reconstruction. During this time, the station had an elevator installed for ADA compliance. The closure was initially expected to last for 7–12 months; however, the station's reopening date was delayed by several months to March 3, 2025.

== Bus connections ==
CTA

- 4 Cottage Grove
- 106 East 103rd
- 115 Pullman/115th
