= Diane Latiker =

American community activist

Diane Latiker is a community activist in Chicago. Latiker is the founder of the nonprofit, Kids Off the Block (KOB), which provides recreational activities and educational opportunities for young people in Chicago, focusing on the neighborhood of Roseland.

== Biography ==
Latiker never finished high-school, dropping out at age 16. She has worked in construction and as a cosmetologist. Latiker has lived in Roseland, Chicago, since 1988. She is the mother of eight children and 13 grandchildren. Latiker eventually remarried when she was 36 and earned her GED.

When Latiker's daughter, Aisha, became a teen in 2003, Latiker began to worry that she would get involved in gang activity. Latiker's mother suggested that she help out the teens in the neighborhood. In 2003, Latiker literally turned her own home into a community center for young people. She sold her TV to buy used computers, and got rid of furniture to make space for kids in her home. She opened her house to the children in the neighborhood, letting them know she was available any time of the day to help. Latiker did not expect the idea to turn her home into a community center to become so popular, but in about 3 months, she had 75 kids visiting regularly. Latiker became known to the Roseland neighborhood as Ms. Diane.

Latiker called her project Kids Off the Block (KOB) and started KOB because she felt that her community was "plagued by violence, hopelessness and negativity." There were no places for kids in her neighborhood to play prior to opening KOB. Latiker is widely revered in her neighborhood, though she has also been threatened by "gang bangers" who have shot up her van. Her program provides young people an alternative to joining a gang. Latiker tries to help the young people who come to KOB in many ways, but especially by listening to them; "The only way I can help them is if I listen and know what they need. In 2011, Latiker made it to the top ten of CNN Heroes.
