= 95th Street/Chicago State University station =

Commuter rail station in Chicago, Illinois

95th Street Chicago State University

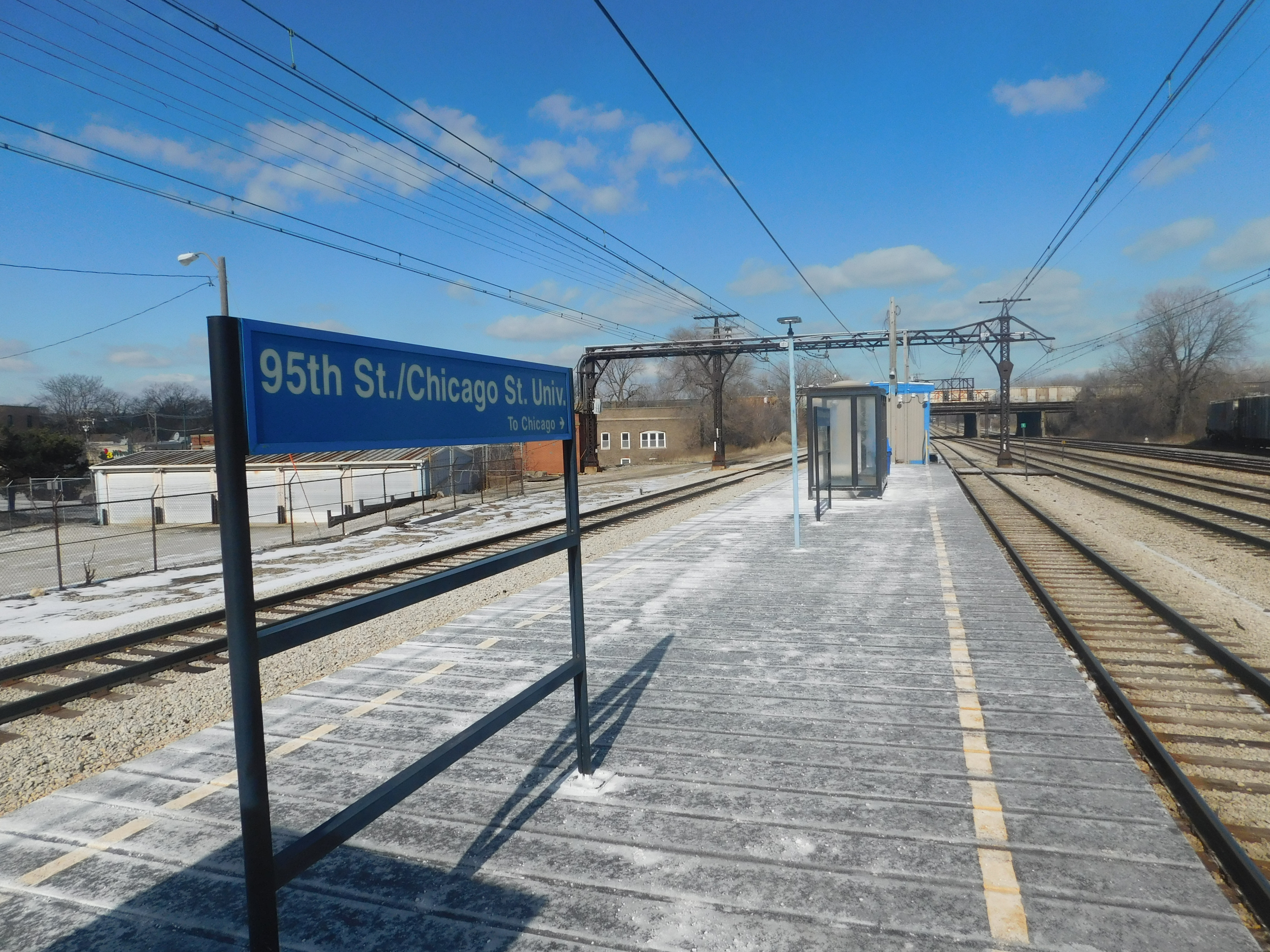
- 95th Street/Chicago State University station in February 2016.

General information
- Location: 95th Street and Cottage Grove Avenue; Roseland, Chicago, Illinois
- Coordinates: 41.7216°N 87.6039°W
- Owner: Metra
- Line: University Park Sub District
- Platforms: 1 island platform
- Tracks: 4
- Connections: CTA Buses

Construction
- Parking: No
- Accessible: No

Other information
- Fare zone: 2

History
- Closed: March 3, 2025 (temporary)
- Rebuilt: 2025-2027 (expected)
- Electrified: 1926

Passengers
- 2018: 24 (average weekday) ▼7.7%
- Rank: 224 out of 236

Services
Preceding station	Metra	Following station
103rd Street/Rosemoor toward University Park or Blue Island	Metra Electric Main Line & Blue Island Branch	91st Street/Chesterfield toward Millennium
Former services
Preceding station	Illinois Central Railroad	Following station
103rd Street toward Richton or Blue Island	Electric Suburban Main Line & Blue Island Branch	91st Street toward Randolph Street
Track layout
Location

95th Street/Chicago State University is an electrified commuter rail station along Metra Electric's main line on the northeast corner of Chicago State University in Chicago, Illinois. The station is located at 95th Street and Cottage Grove Avenue, and is 12.0 miles (19.3 km) away from the northern terminus at Millennium Station. In Metra's zone-based fare system, 95th Street/Chicago State University is in zone 2. As of 2018, the station is the 224th busiest of Metra's 236 non-downtown stations, with an average of 24 weekday boardings.

Like much of the main branch of the Metra Electric line, 95th Street-CSU is built on elevated tracks near the embankment of a bridge over 95th Street. This bridge also carries the Amtrak line that runs parallel to it, carrying the City of New Orleans, Illini, and Saluki trains. In addition the line, which is owned by Canadian National Railway has a connection to the Norfolk Southern Railway which crosses over the tracks as well as Cottage Grove Avenue, between Lyon and Burnside Avenues.

== History ==
In April 2004, the Chicago State University master plan called for a new station south of the existing one. On August 1, 2019, it was announced that Metra and Chicago State University would substantially renovate the station. The work will consist of a new platform, stair enclosure, an elevator and at least one on-demand heater. The completion of the work would lead to regularly scheduled stops.

The station is currently closed for reconstruction since March 3, 2025, which coincided with the reopening of 103rd Street/Rosemoor station, and is expected to reopen in the third quarter of 2027.

== Bus connections ==
CTA

- 4 Cottage Grove
- X4 Cottage Grove Express (weekday rush hours only)
- N5 South Shore Night Bus (Overnight only)
- 95 95th
- 100 Jeffery Manor Express (weekday rush hours only)
- 115 Pullman/115th
