= Supreme Life Building =

Coordinates: 41.8309°N 87.6167°W

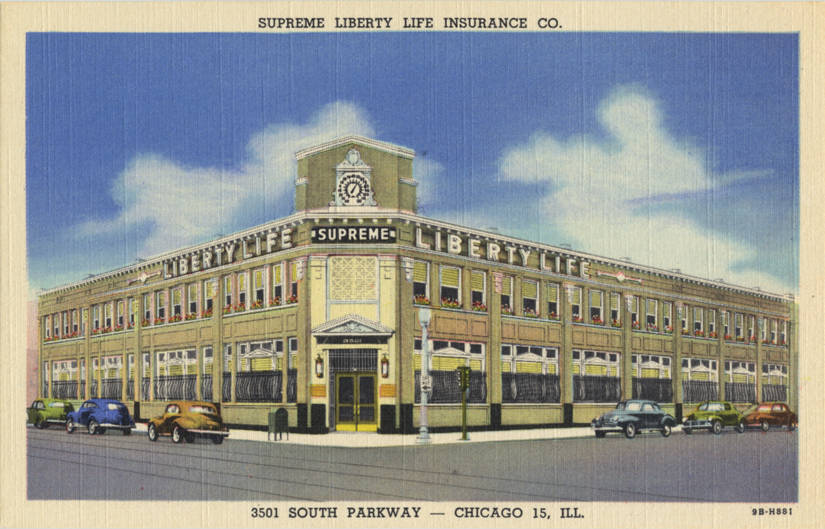
A 1949 postcard of the Supreme Life Building.

The Supreme Life Building is a historic insurance building located at 3501 S. Dr. Martin Luther King Drive in the Douglas community area of Chicago, Illinois. Built in 1921, the building served as the headquarters of the Supreme Life Insurance Company, which was founded two years earlier by Frank L. Gillespie. The company, originally known as the Liberty Life Insurance Company, was the first African-American owned insurance company in the northern United States. Since white-owned insurance firms regularly denied black customers life insurance when the firm was founded, the firm played an important role in providing life insurance to Chicago's African-American community. The company ultimately became the largest African-American owned business in the northern states and became a symbol of the predominantly black Bronzeville neighborhood's economic success from the 1920s to the 1950s.

In the 1990s, the building was nearly demolished before it was purchased by the Black Metropolis Convention and Tourism Council. The group rehabilitated the building in 2005, and it now serves as the Bronzeville Visitor Information Center.

The building was designated as a Chicago Landmark on September 9, 1998. It is one of nine buildings designated as part of the Black Metropolis-Bronzeville District.
