= Brainerd Bungalow Historic District =

- U.S. National Register of Historic Places
- U.S. Historic district
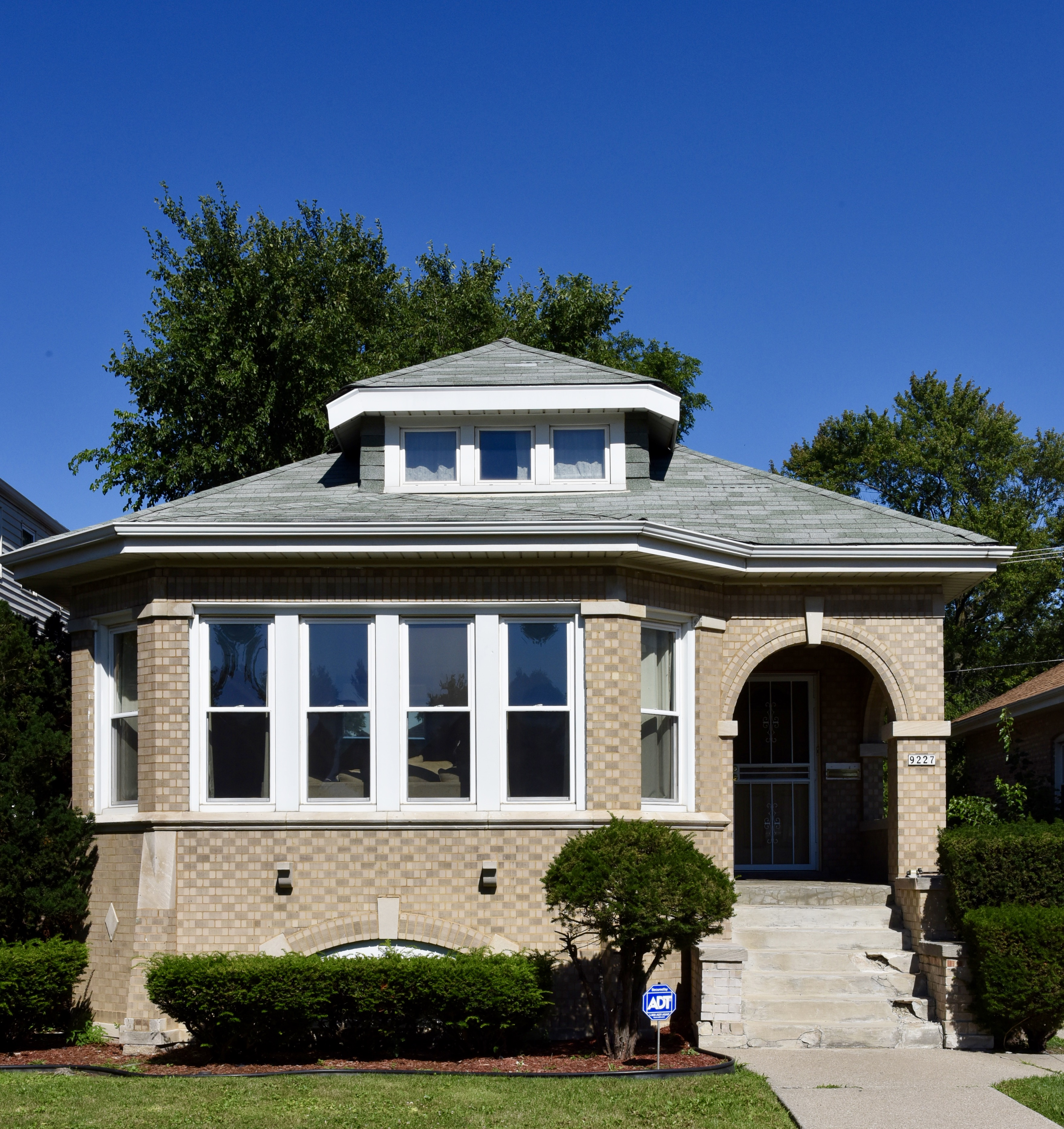

- Location within Chicago metropolitan area Location within Illinois Location within the United States
- Location: Roughly bounded by W. 89th Street, S. May Street, W. 95th Street & S. Loomis Street, Chicago, Illinois
- Coordinates: 41°43′37″N 87°39′20″W
- Area: 129 acres (52 ha)
- Architectural style: Chicago Bungalow
- MPS: Chicago Bungalows MPS
- NRHP reference No.: 16000895
- Added to NRHP: December 27, 2016

The Brainerd Bungalow Historic District is a residential historic district in the Brainerd neighborhood of the Washington Heights community area of Chicago, Illinois. The district includes 527 Chicago bungalows built between 1915 and 1931 and a small number of other residential buildings. Brainerd, an outlying neighborhood of Chicago, was developed in the 1910s and 1920s as the increasing accessibility of homeownership spurred new home construction in underpopulated areas of the city. As bungalows were affordable to construct, they became popular in newly developed neighborhoods, and tens of thousands of them were built throughout the city. While 42 different architects designed Brainerd's bungalows, the neighborhood has a consistent appearance nonetheless, as the affordability of bungalows came in part from how easy the design was to duplicate; however, architects used color and detail work to give each home a unique design.

The district was added to the National Register of Historic Places on December 27, 2016.
