= Kids Off the Block =

Memorial of gun violence

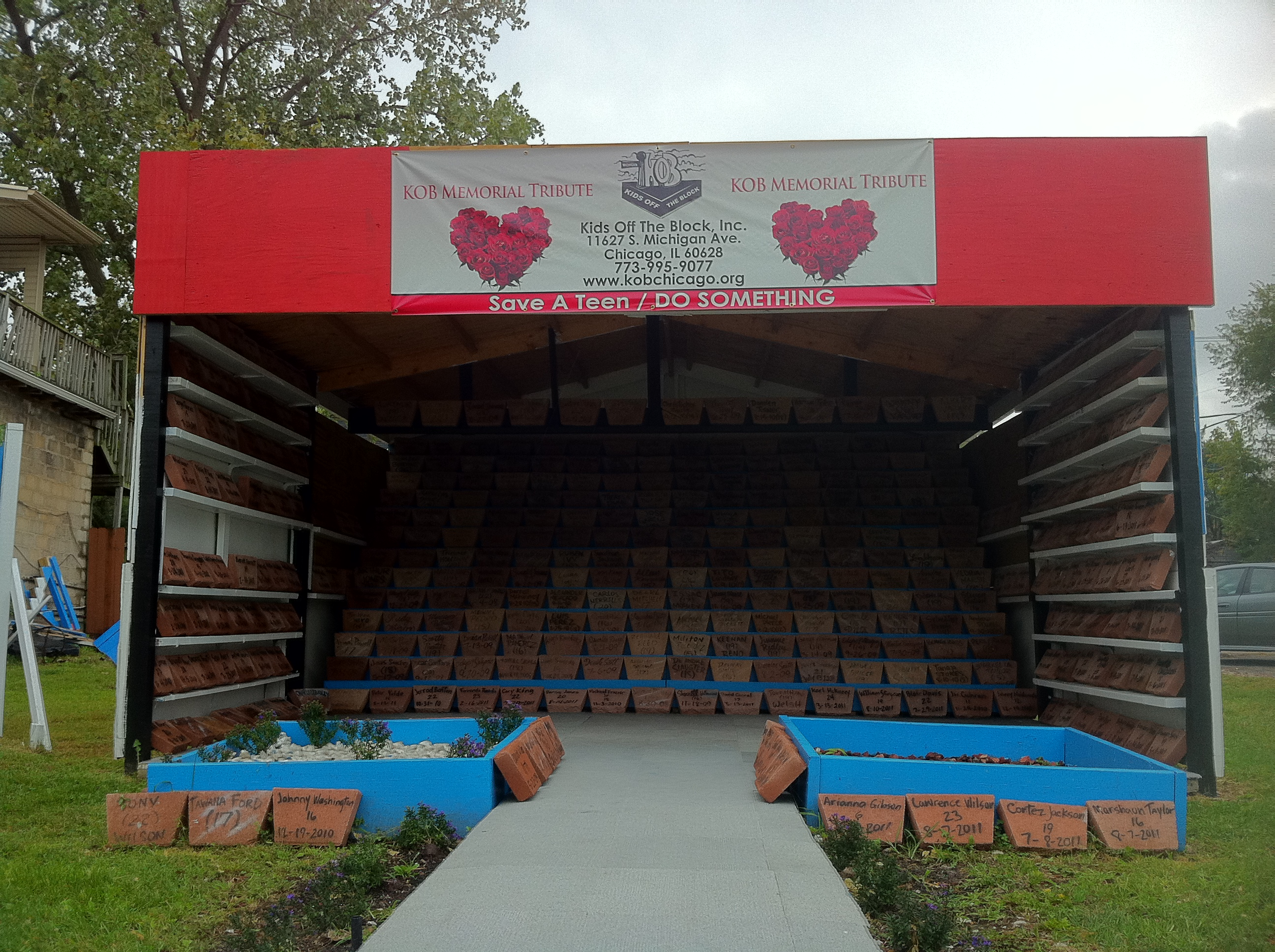
The Kids Off The Block memorial featuring hundreds of stones, one for each person killed by gun violence in Chicago

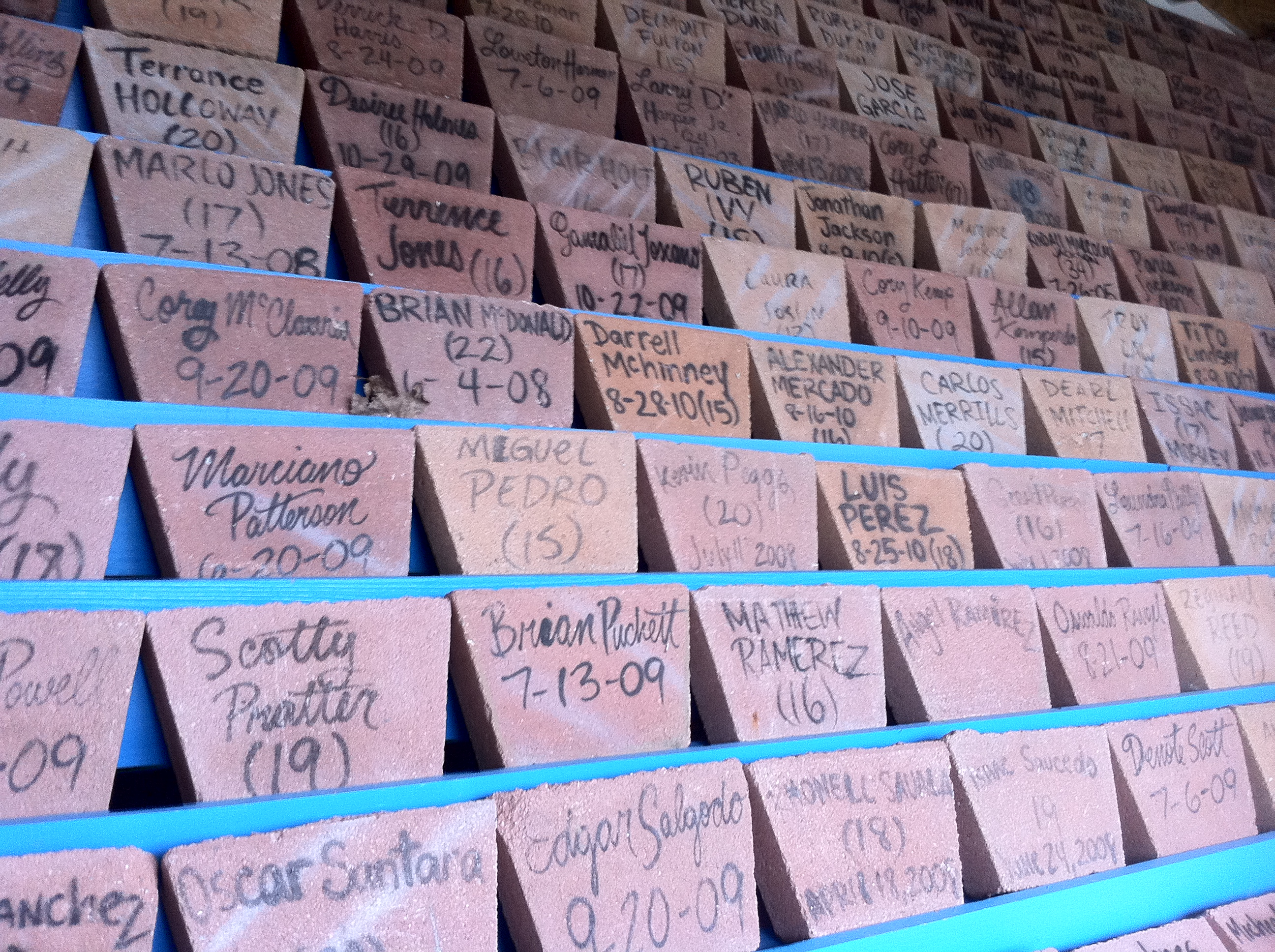
The stones to memorialize the young people killed in Chicago, featuring the names, ages and date of death of the young people

Kids Off the Block (KOB) was a memorial of stones of young people killed by gun violence. The memorial was located in Chicago's West Pullman neighborhood, with the mission "to provide at-risk low income youth positive alternatives to gangs, drugs, truancy, violence and the juvenile justice system."

KOB was founded in 2003 by Diane Latiker, a mother of eight, who opened her home to youth in her community to help steer them away from the negative influences of the streets. KOB works with youth, teens, and young adults ages 12–24 years old. Latiker developed KOB's programming after talking with Roseland youth about their issues and concerns. "I found out that the kids don't even dream about tomorrow anymore", Latiker said in a 2006 Chicago Tribune article. "You ask, 'What do you want to be when you grow up?' They say, 'What?' "

As a result, KOB offers homework help, mentoring, music, drama, sports, community service and a "safe place" to hang out. Starting out with ten children from the neighborhood, more than a decade later, KOB has serviced more than 2,000 participants since its inception.

To shock people into action, Latiker set up a stone memorial at 11627 South Michigan Avenue in memory of all the young people who have lost their life to gun violence since 2007. There are more than 600 stones lining the memorial, each representing a victim.

Through her efforts, Latiker has become a voice for local youth. "Our young people need help", she told CNN in 2011. "All of them are not gangbangers. All of them are not dropouts. But the ones that are, they need our help."

== Programs ==
KOB provides structured programs and events for youth including Tutoring/Mentoring, Drama, Music, Sports, Community Service, Local/Out of Town Travel, Job Readiness, GED Preparation, Health/Fitness and Nutrition, Cultural Arts.

The following organizations have partnered with Kids Off the Block:

- Roseland Safety Networks
- CAPs (Community Assistance Programs)
- St. John Missionary Baptist Church
- Nehemiah Restoration Coalition
- Illinois Healthcare Consortium
- Phalanx Family Services
- Worldvision
- Greater Roseland Chamber of Commerce

The organization maintains a memorial to children killed by violence in Chicago (pictured).

== History ==
Kids Off the Block was started by Diane Latiker (called 'Ms. Diane' by KOB teens) in 2003. As of 2012, more than 2,000 kids have been assisted by the organization.

Diane Latiker was named one of the top 10 CNN Heroes of the Year in 2011.

== See also ==
- Crime in Chicago
