= Washington Heights, Chicago =

Community area in Chicago, Illinois

Washington Heights
- Community area
- Community Area 73 – Washington Heights
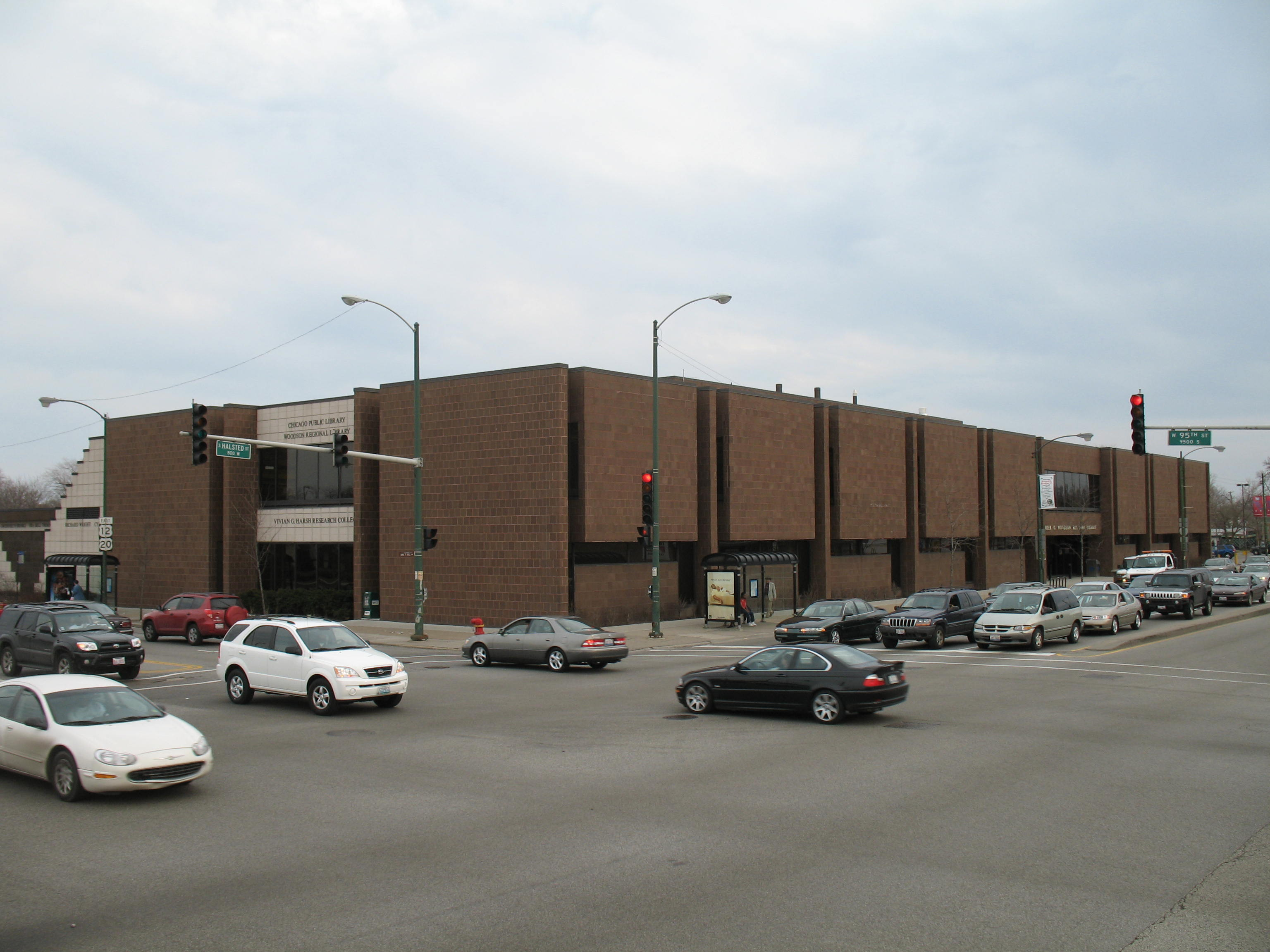
- Carter G. Woodson Regional Library

- Location in Chicago

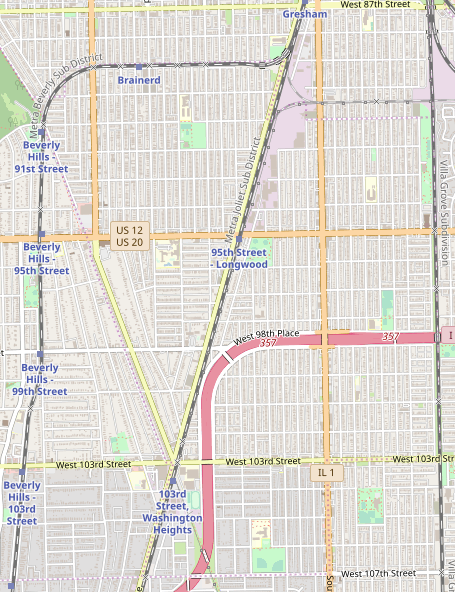
- Street map of Washington Heights and its immediate surroundings, from OpenStreetMap
- Coordinates: 41°42.23′N 87°39.22′W
- Country: United States
- State: Illinois
- County: Cook
- City: Chicago
- Named for: George Washington
- Neighborhoods: list: Brainerd; Fernwood; Washington Heights

Area
  - Total: 2.1425 sq mi (5.5490 km^{2})

Population (2024)
  - Total: 24,851
  - Density: 11,599/sq mi (4,478.5/km^{2})

Demographics (2024)
  - White: 1.4 %
  - Black: 93.0 %
  - Hispanic: 3.7 %
  - Asian: 0.3 %
  - Other: 1.7 %
- Time zone: UTC-6 (CST)
  - Summer (DST): UTC-5 (CDT)
- ZIP Codes: parts of 60620, 60628 and 60643

Washington Heights is the 73rd of Chicago's 77 community areas. Located 12 miles (19 km) from the Loop, it is on the city's far south side. Washington Heights is considered part of the Blue Island Ridge, along with the nearby community areas of Beverly Hills, Morgan Park and Mount Greenwood, and the village of Blue Island. It contains a neighborhood also known as Washington Heights, as well as the neighborhoods of Brainerd and Fernwood. As of 2017, Washington Heights had 27,453 inhabitants.

Named for the heights which are now part of the adjacent Beverly Hills, the area was settled in the late 19th century at the intersection of two railroad lines. It was incorporated as a village in 1874, and was annexed by Chicago in 1890. During most of the 20th century, Washington Heights was primarily inhabited by Irish, Germans and Swedes; after late-20th-century white flight, it has been mainly inhabited by African-Americans. The area largely retained its middle-class character during its racial transition, declining somewhat in recent years.

Historically influenced by transit, Washington Heights includes the original site of the former Chicago Bridge & Iron Company. The Brainerd Bungalow Historic District and the Carter G. Woodson Regional Library, home of the largest collection of African-American history in the midwestern United States, are in the area.

== History ==
=== Etymology ===
The area was named "Washington Heights" in honor of George Washington when a post office was established in 1869. The eponymous heights split off and became Beverly by 1900. Brainerd was named for E. L. Brainerd, who built a train station at 89th and Loomis Streets in 1887. Washington Heights was also known as Blue Island Ridge, Campbell's Woods, Dummy Junction, and North Blue Island.

=== 19th century ===
What is now Washington Heights was primarily inhabited by farmers from the 1830s to the 1860s. The earliest known non-indigenous settlers in the area were DeWitt Lane in 1832, and Norman Rexford and Jefferson Gardner in 1834. Gardner established a tavern in 1836, which was acquired by William Wilcox in 1844. Wilcox had well water on his farm, which he served to travellers on the Vincennes Trail to Indiana; his tavern (and many others in the area) was popular, since nearby Beverly prohibited the sale of alcohol. John Blackstone purchased the land bordered by modern-day Halsted Street, Western Avenue, 91st and 115th Streets in 1839. Potawatami Indians remained in the area until they were expelled by treaty and settled in modern-day Kansas and Oklahoma in 1844. That year, Blackstone sold his land to Thomas Morgan of Surrey for $5,450. (Note: $147,000 in 2018)

Irish, Germans, and native-born Americans settled the intersection of modern-day 103rd Street and Vincennes Avenue in 1860. The incorporation of Calumet Township in 1862 accelerated settlement of the area. Railroad workers began to settle in 1864 and 1865, beginning the dominance of railroads. In 1866, Willis M. Hitt and Laurin P. Hilliard subdivided land in the vicinity; this was followed three years later by the Blue Island Land and Building Company. Settlers and speculators were attracted to the area, which was at the intersection of the Rock Island Railroad and Panhandle Lines; both had been built in 1852. The Blue Island Land and Building Company was led by Frederick Hampden Winston, and among its stockholders was Rock Island Railroad president John F. Tracy. A Washington Heights post office was established in 1869, and Washington Heights was incorporated as a village in 1874. The village was annexed by Chicago in 1890.

The modern community area is a conglomeration of early settlements, particularly the former Brainerd and Fernwood. Fernwood was established in 1883, southeast of Washington Heights. Growth was rapid, and it had over 185 houses by 1885. Brainerd was settled in 1880, northwest of Washington Heights; unlike Fernwood, it grew slowly due to a lack of transportation. Brainerd was annexed by Chicago at the same time as Washington Heights; Fernwood followed in 1891, and was incorporated into Washington Heights. Brainerd and Fernwood continue as neighborhoods to this day.

=== 20th century ===
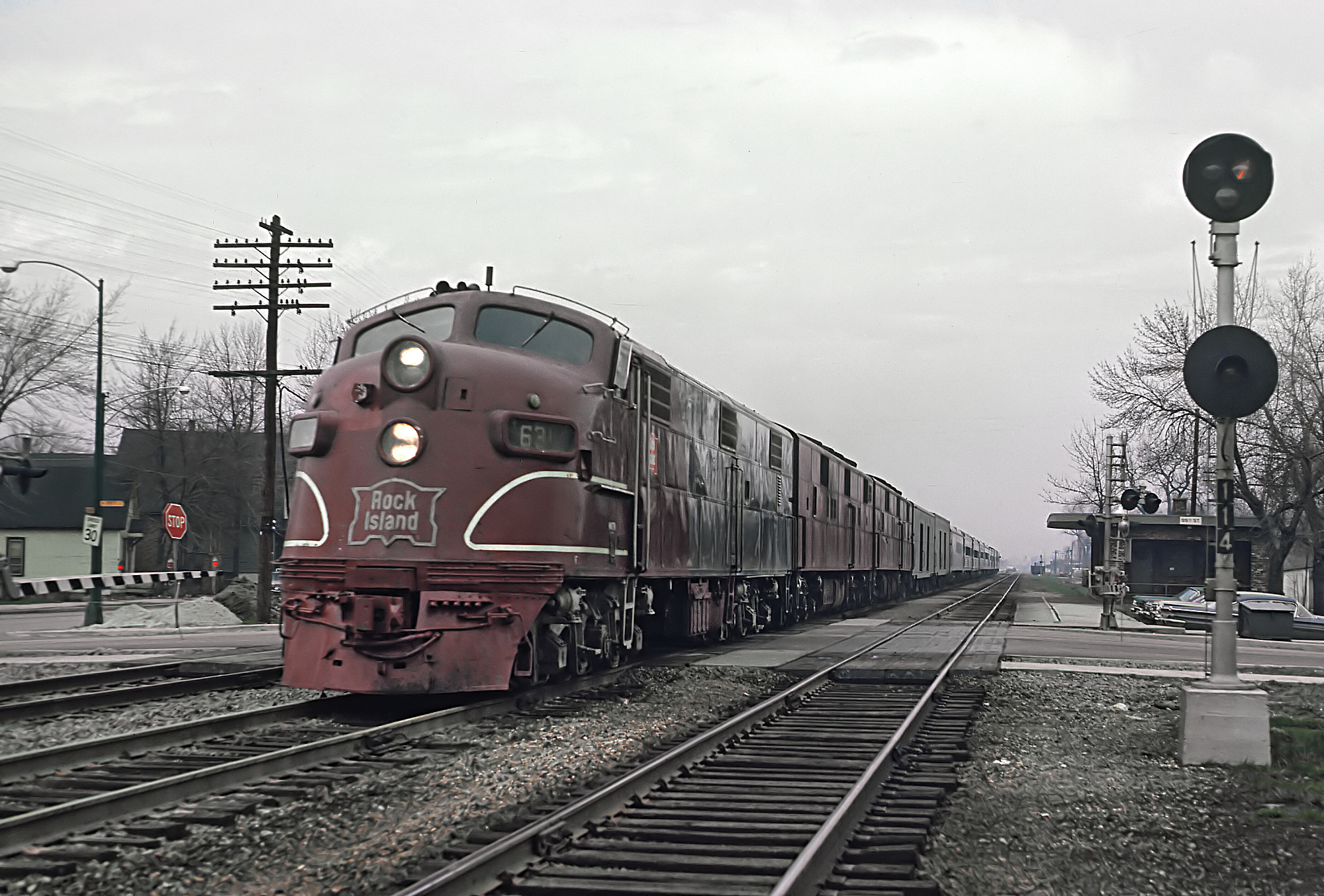
The Golden State running through Washington Heights in 1965

The Men's Club of Brainerd was formed in 1902, and was renamed the Brainerd Improvement Club in 1903 to admit women. Gas lines were run in 1905, and telephones were installed in 1907. Streetcars were extended into the area in 1912. Loomis Street was paved in 1913, but the remaining roads north of the Rock Island Railroad tracks remained unpaved until 1925; the roads south of the tracks were paved in 1927. Electric streetlights were installed in 1928 and 1929. Brick bungalows were built between 1920 and 1950. Growth slowed during the Great Depression, but rebounded in the 1940s.

Washington Heights was one of the 75 (Note: O'Hare was formed from annexed territory during the 1950s and Edgewater was separated from Uptown in 1980, bringing the modern total to 77.) community areas defined by the University of Chicago during the 1920s. The area's residents at this time were predominantly Irish, German and Swedish workers, who had moved from Englewood and Greater Grand Crossing. In 1940, foreign-born whites were 12.5 percent of the population; the top five nationalities were German, Irish, Swedish, Canadian, and English (or Welsh).

African-Americans began moving into the area east of Halsted Street during the 1950s; they had been restricted to certain areas of the city, and expanded into others in search of better homes and jobs. The African-American proportion of the population increased from 12 to 75 percent between 1960 and 1970, a trend encouraged by blockbusting. Despite fears by many whites of decreasing property values, the economic status of the new residents differed little; Washington Heights remained middle-class. Interstate 57 was built through the area, opening in 1967 and forcing many residents to move. The only highway in the city without a nickname, a portion of it was named for the Tuskegee Airmen in 2012.

=== 21st century ===
Median household income declined somewhat during the 2000s; it was $2,000 less than the citywide median in 2013, and had been $6,000 above the citywide median in 1989.

The site of the Chicago Bridge & Iron Company foundry became a development of single-family homes. Known as the Renaissance at Beverly Ridge, the original development plan for the site failed due to lack of funds during a housing-market crash after about 25 homes were built. An alderman's wife was responsible for selling the development and received money from tax increment financing (leading to suspicions of impropriety), and a new developer stepped to finish the project. This developer, who had close relations to alderman Carrie Austin, also failed to meet expectations, being unable to produce the promised 91 houses by June 2019 and leading to the city cutting off public funds to the project that December. The project continued during the early 2020s without incident, except on a single block that was beleaguered by problems in home construction and delays in contract closing. Attempts by residents on that block to fix the problems were fruitless until Austin's office was contacted. Given that the block is expected to be renamed in honor of the new developer, a white man, and the neighborhood is majority black was also the source of controversy given the issues.

== Geography and neighborhoods ==
Washington Heights is community area #73. It is on Chicago's far south side, 12 miles (19 km) from the Loop. Its northern border is the railroad tracks at 89th Street, and its southern border is West 107th Street. At several points its eastern border is Eggleston and Halsted, and its western border is Beverly Avenue until 103rd Street (when it shifts to Vincennes Avenue). The area contains the neighborhoods of Brainerd, Washington Heights, and Fernwood, and covers an area of 2.1425 square miles (5.549 km^{2}). It is geographically divided by the Metra Rock Island Line tracks and Interstate 57.

Washington Heights, Morgan Park, Beverly, Mount Greenwood, and Blue Island are considered part of the Blue Island Ridge. The ridge is a glacial bluff which was named for its color, due to atmospheric conditions or its blue wildflowers. In 2015 the area had 795.8 acres (322.0 ha) of single-family housing, 68.8 acres (27.8 ha) of multifamily housing, 55.3 acres (22.4 ha) of commercial development, 36.6 acres (14.8 ha) of industrial development, 84.5 acres (34.2 ha) of institutional development, and 9.9 acres (4.0 ha) of mixed-use development. An additional 676.5 acres (273.8 ha) was defined as transportation and other.

About three-quarters of the housing stock, 74.3 percent, in Washington Heights consists of single-family detached homes. Most of the houses (57.5 percent) were built between 1940 and 1969. The median number of rooms in an area house is 6.4, compared to 4.8 rooms citywide. 88.6 percent of the housing units were occupied between 2015 and 2019, compared to a 90.1-percent occupancy rate between 2006 and 2010. Of the total number of units, (Note: Including those which are vacant, so the sum is not 100 percent.) 67.7 percent were owner-occupied and 32.3 percent were renter-occupied between 2015 and 2019, compared to 69.5 percent and 30.5 percent between 2006 and 2010. Between 51 and 100 multifamily buildings in the area were considered affordable in 2016.

=== Brainerd ===
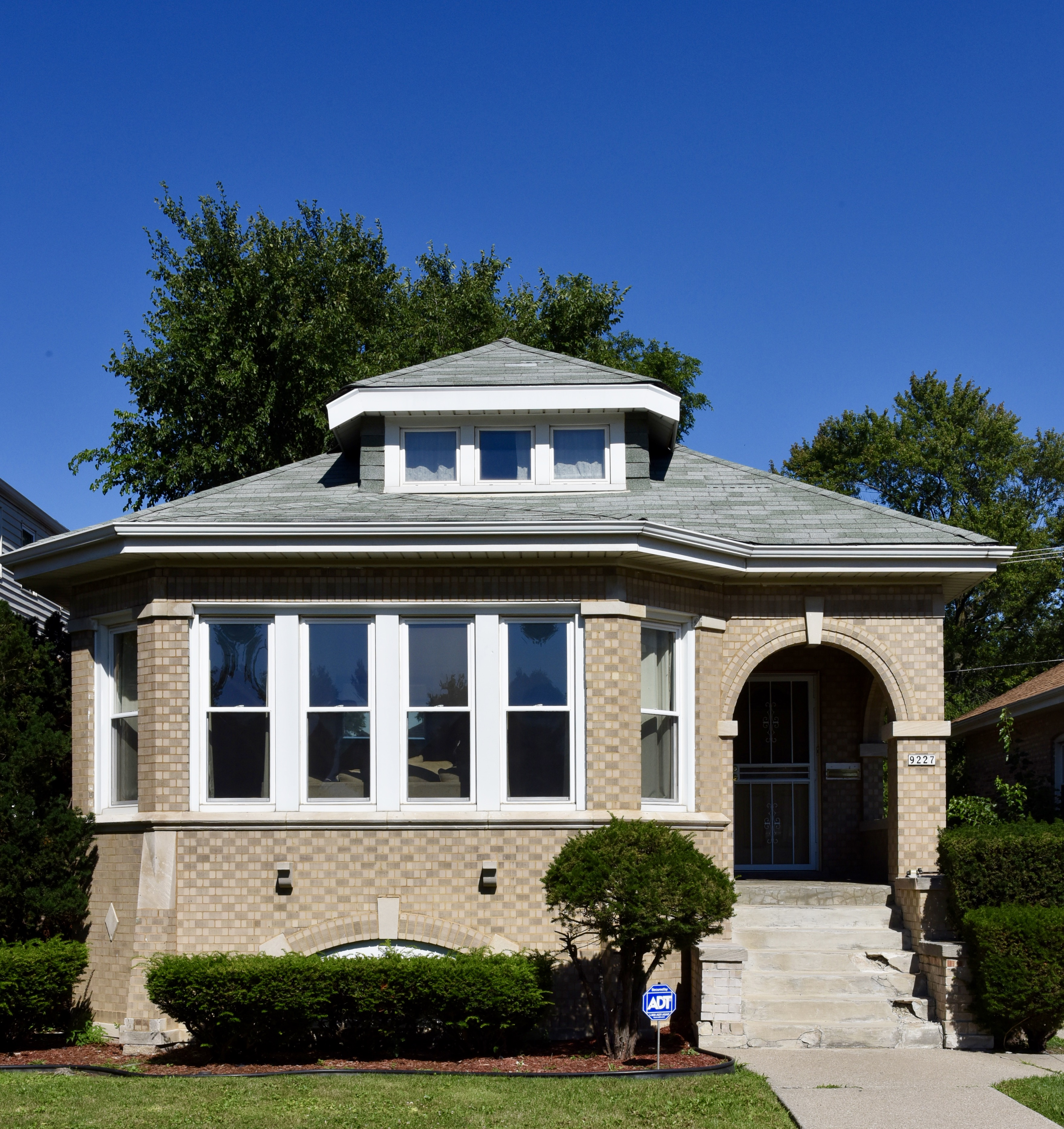
Bungalow in the Brainerd Historic District

The original Brainerd settlement was bounded by 87th and 91st Streets and Racine and Ashland Avenues. The modern neighborhood is bounded by 89th Street, Princeton Park, 95th Street, and Beverly Boulevard. It contains the Brainerd Bungalow Historic District, which was added to the National Register of Historic Places in 2016. The historic district is roughly bounded by 89th Street, 95th Street, Loomis Street, and May Street. It consists of bungalows built between 1915 and 1931, with construction peaking in 1927. The district experienced a construction boom during the 1910s and 1920s, and its construction mirrors that of similar contemporary districts across the United States. Although 42 architects are known to have designed the district's buildings, several (including William E. Sammons, Braucher, McClellan, Joneke, and Johnson) dominated the construction. Almost half of the buildings have no known architect, however, and relied on preexisting building plans. In addition to the bungalows which make up most of the district's buildings, several multi-family residential buildings (duplexes and apartment buildings) are stylistically similar.

=== Fernwood ===
Fernwood is in southeastern Washington Heights. Established in 1883, it was annexed by Chicago in 1891. Parts of Fernwood extend into nearby Roseland, the location of a 1947 race riot over the placement of black veterans in the Fernwood Park Homes housing project. More than 1,000 police officers dispersed over 500 rioters, making 18 arrests in one of the largest dispatches of Chicago police at the time.

=== Washington Heights ===
The community area includes a neighborhood with the same name. The original Washington Heights settlement was centered around 103rd Street and Vincennes Avenue, and was annexed by Chicago in 1890.

== Demographics ==
Historical population
Census	Pop.	Note	%±
1930	17,865		—
1940	19,370		8.4%
1950	24,488		26.4%
1960	29,793		21.7%
1970	36,540		22.6%
1980	36,453		−0.2%
1990	32,114		−11.9%
2000	29,843		−7.1%
2010	26,493		−11.2%
2020	25,065		−5.4%

In 2020, 25,065 people in 9,538 households lived in Washington Heights. This represents a decrease of 5.4 percent from the 2010 Census, which in turn had represented a 11.2 percent decline from the 2000 Census. The area's racial composition between 2015 and 2019 was 1.3 percent white, 96.1 percent African-American, and 1.5 percent other races. Hispanics or Latinos of any race made up 1.1 percent of the population. The age range during that time was broad, with 23.2 percent under the age of 19, 19.7 percent aged 20 to 34, 17.6 percent aged 35 to 49, 21.3 percent aged 50 to 64, and 18.3 percent aged 65 or older. The median age was 41.9. English was the only language spoken by 97.8 percent of the population aged five and older, compared to a citywide figure of 64 percent.

Between 2015 and 2019, median household income was $51,800, compared to the citywide median income of $58,247. Regarding income distribution, 29.4 percent of households earned less than $25,000 annually; 19.2 percent earned between $25,000 and $49,999; 18.4 percent earned between $50,000 and $74,999; 12.7 percent earned between $75,000 and $99,999; 13.7 percent earned between $100,000 and $149,999, and 6.6 percent earned more than $150,000. This compares with a citywide distribution of 24.3 percent, 19.9 percent, 15.1 percent, 11.2 percent, 13.8 percent and 15.7 percent, respectively. As of September 2015, most census tracts in the area had a median household income between $36,200 and $57,900 and were above the Department of Housing and Urban Development (HUD)'s low-income limit; two tracts had a median household income between $21,700 and $36,200, below HUD's low-income limit but above its very-low-income limit.

Hardship index is a metric, used by Chicago, which takes six indicators of public health to quantify the relative amount of hardship in a community area. The indicators generate a score of one to 100, with a higher score indicating greater hardship. With data from 2006 to 2010, Washington Heights's hardship index was 48.

== Economy and employment ==
Chicago Bridge & Iron Company was founded at 105th and Throop in 1889, and later relocated to Texas. Between 2015 and 2019, 55.7 percent of Washington Heights' population was in the labor force; the unemployment rate was 15.7 percent, compared to the citywide rate of 8.1 percent. Of those employed in 2018, a plurality (35.5 percent) worked outside Chicago; 25 percent worked in the Loop, 7.7 percent on the Near North Side, 5 percent on the Near West Side, and 1.8 percent in Hyde Park. About five percent of those employed in Washington Heights lived there; nearly half lived outside the city of Chicago.

Healthcare was Washington Heights' leading employer, employing 18.7 percent of the area's residents and making up 28 percent of its employees. The next four industries in employment of Washington Heights residents were administration (10.8 percent), education (10.7 percent), retail (9.6 percent), and public administration (9.3 percent). The next four industries in area employment were retail (21.8 percent), education (21.5 percent), accommodation and food service (9.9 percent), and other service (5.6 percent).

In 2019, Ashland Avenue and most of Vincennes Avenue were zoned for commerce, and 95th, 103rd and Halsted Streets and a portion of Vincennes Avenue were zoned for business. Halsted Street south of 103rd Street and 103rd Street east of Halsted Street made up a retail hub, and other retail establishments were scattered along 95th Street, Ashland Avenue, Vincennes Avenue, and elsewhere on Halsted.

== Politics ==
=== Local ===
In the Chicago City Council, Washington Heights is divided among the 21st Ward on the north (represented by Howard Brookins, who lives in the area), the 34th Ward on the south (represented by Carrie Austin), and the 9th Ward in its southeastern corner (represented by Anthony Beale).

Aldermen who represented Washington Heights from 1890 to 1983
Years	31st Ward		32nd Ward		19th Ward	21st Ward	34th Ward	9th Ward
1890–1891	Edwin J. Noble	George F. McKnight	Not in ward		Not in ward	Not in ward	Not in ward	Not in ward
1891–1893	Edwin J. Noble	Edwin A. Plowman	Not in ward		Not in ward	Not in ward	Not in ward	Not in ward
1893–1895	Edwin J. Noble	James L. Francis	Not in ward		Not in ward	Not in ward	Not in ward	Not in ward
1895–1896	Edwin J. Noble	Isaiah T. Greenacre	Not in ward		Not in ward	Not in ward	Not in ward	Not in ward
1896–1897	Clark T. Northrop	Isaiah T. Greenacre	Not in ward		Not in ward	Not in ward	Not in ward	Not in ward
1897–1898	Clark T. Northrop	Elliot W. Sproul	Not in ward		Not in ward	Not in ward	Not in ward	Not in ward
1898–1899	Joseph Badenoch	Elliot W. Sproul	Not in ward		Not in ward	Not in ward	Not in ward	Not in ward
1899–1901	Joseph Badenoch	Henry F. Eidmann	Not in ward		Not in ward	Not in ward	Not in ward	Not in ward
1901–1906	Not in ward		Joseph Badenoch	Henry F. Eidmann	Not in ward	Not in ward	Not in ward	Not in ward
1906–1908	Not in ward		Joseph Badenoch	Albert J. Fisher	Not in ward	Not in ward	Not in ward	Not in ward
1908–1909	Not in ward		Homer E. Tinsman	Albert J. Fisher	Not in ward	Not in ward	Not in ward	Not in ward
1909–1912	Not in ward		James Rea	Albert J. Fisher	Not in ward	Not in ward	Not in ward	Not in ward
1912–1914	Not in ward		Melville G. Holding	Albert J. Fisher	Not in ward	Not in ward	Not in ward	Not in ward
1914–1918	Not in ward		James Rea	Albert J. Fisher	Not in ward	Not in ward	Not in ward	Not in ward
1918–1921	Not in ward		John E. Lyle	Albert J. Fisher	Not in ward	Not in ward	Not in ward	Not in ward
1921–1923	Not in ward		John E. Lyle	Benjamin S. Wilson	Not in ward	Not in ward	Not in ward	Not in ward
1923–1928	Not in ward		Not in ward		Donald S. McKinlay, Democratic	Not in ward	Not in ward	Not in ward
1928–1929	Not in ward		Not in ward		Vacant	Not in ward	Not in ward	Not in ward
1929–1935	Not in ward		Not in ward		O. E. Northrup, Republican	Not in ward	Not in ward	Not in ward
1935–1937	Not in ward		Not in ward		John J. Duffy	Not in ward	Not in ward	Not in ward
1935–1950	Not in ward		Not in ward		Brian J. Ducey	Not in ward	Not in ward	Not in ward
1950–1951	Not in ward		Not in ward		Vacant	Not in ward	Not in ward	Not in ward
1951–1957	Not in ward		Not in ward		David T. McKiernan	Not in ward	Not in ward	Not in ward
1957–1963	Not in ward		Not in ward		Thomas F. Fitzpatrick	Not in ward	Not in ward	Not in ward
1963–1967	Not in ward		Not in ward		Thomas F. Fitzpatrick	Samuel Yaksic	Not in ward	Not in ward
1967–1971	Not in ward		Not in ward		Thomas F. Fitzpatrick	Wilson Frost, Democratic	Not in ward	Not in ward
1971–1979	Not in ward		Not in ward		Not in ward	Bennett Stewart, Democratic	Wilson Frost, Democratic	Not in ward
1979–1983	Not in ward		Not in ward		Not in ward	Niles Sherman, Democratic	Wilson Frost, Democratic	Not in ward

In the Cook County Board of Commissioners, it is split between the 5th District (represented by Democrat Deborah Sims) on the south and the 4th District (represented by Democrat Stanley Moore, who lives in the area) on the north.

=== State ===
In the Illinois House of Representatives, most of Washington Heights is in District 27 (represented by Democrat Justin Slaughter); the western part of Brainerd is in District 35, represented by Democrat Frances Ann Hurley. Slaughter lives in the area, and Hurley lives in Mount Greenwood. In the Illinois Senate, most of the area is in District 14, represented by Democrat Emil Jones III; western Brainerd is in District 18, represented by Democrat William Cunningham.

=== Federal ===
Most of Washington Heights is in Illinois's 1st congressional district, represented in the United States House of Representatives by Democrat Bobby Rush. The southeast is part of Illinois's 2nd congressional district, represented by Democrat Robin Kelly. A small area north of 97th Street and west of Beverly Boulevard is part of Illinois's 3rd congressional district, represented by Democrat Marie Newman. In 2017, the Cook Partisan Voting Index of the three districts was D+27, D+29 and D+6, respectively.

In the 2016 presidential election, Washington Heights cast 13,709 votes for Democratic candidate Hillary Clinton and 229 votes for Republican candidate Donald Trump. In the 2012 presidential election, the area cast 16,129 votes for Democratic candidate Barack Obama and 111 votes for Republican candidate Mitt Romney.

== Government ==
=== Courts and governance ===
Washington Heights is in the second subcircuit of the Circuit Court of Cook County. With the rest of Chicago, it is part of the Circuit Court's first municipal district. With the rest of Cook County, it is in the first judicial district of the Supreme Court of Illinois and the state's appellate courts. Washington Heights is in Calumet Township in Cook County. Townships in Chicago were abolished for governmental purposes in 1902, but are still used for property assessment.

=== Public safety ===
Washington Heights is in the Chicago Police Department's 22nd District, whose headquarters is in nearby Morgan Park. Between November 2018 and November 2019 3,165 crimes were committed in Washington Heights, ranking it 32nd in crime; 291 of the crimes were violent, ranking the community 29th in violent crime. Fire Truck 24 is located at 104th Street and Vincennes Avenue. It is notable as the only Chicago fire house to not house a fire engine.

=== Postal service ===
Washington Heights' ZIP Codes are 60620, 60628, and 60643. Washington Heights does not have any post offices, but some are located in nearby Auburn Gresham, Roseland, and Morgan Park.

== Transportation ==
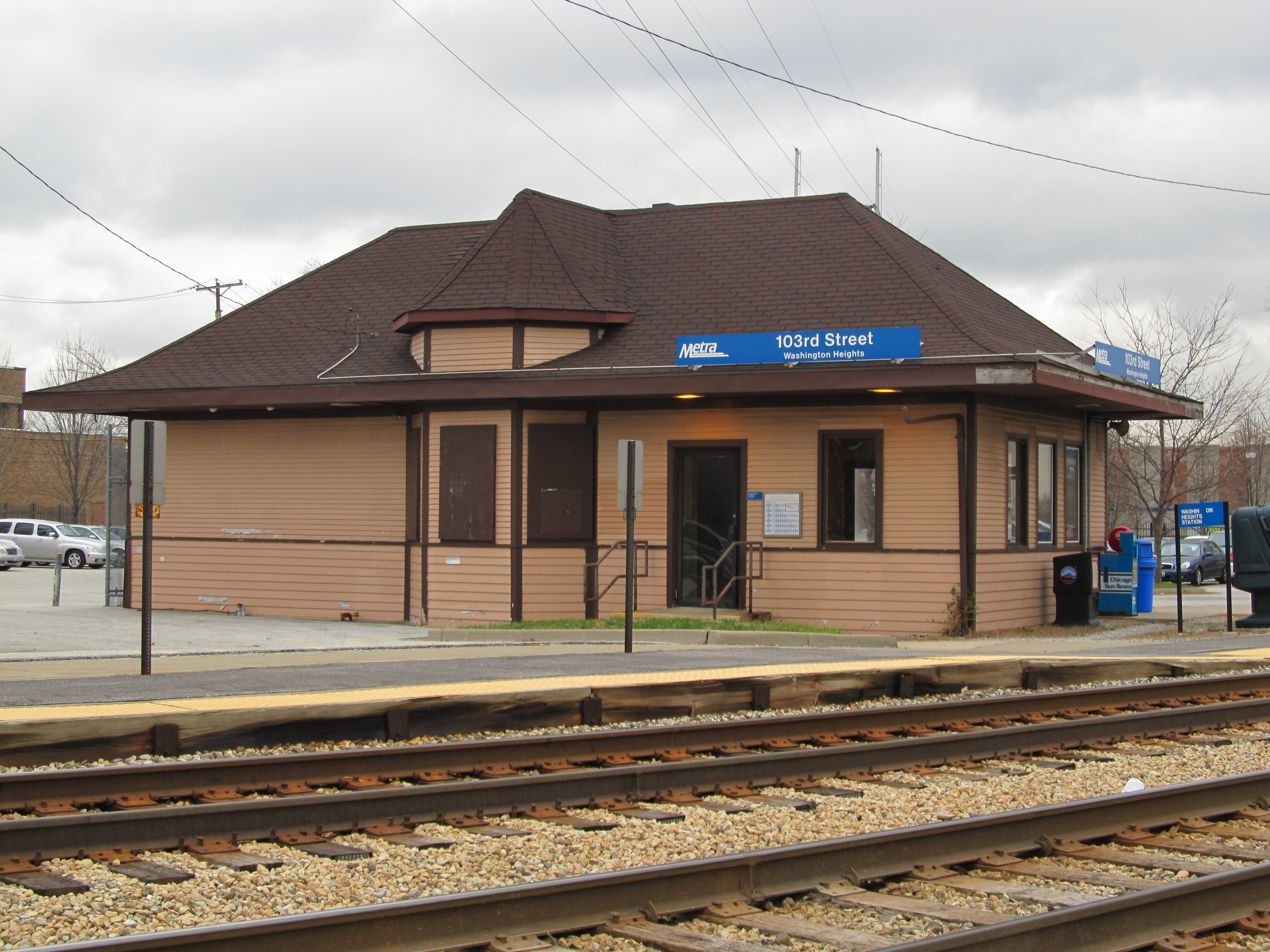
The 103rd Street–Washington Heights station in 2011

The area's history has been described as "all about transit", because of its location at the intersection of two rail lines and the construction of Interstate 57. The Panhandle and Rock Island Lines were built in 1852, and Interstate 57 opened in 1967.

=== Public transportation ===
Metra operates three stations on the Rock Island District line, providing daily inbound commuter-rail service to LaSalle Street Station in Chicago and outbound service to the Joliet Transportation Center. The line splits into two branches just north of Washington Heights; one branch is at the area's northern border, and the other cuts through it. The 91st Street station is on the Beverly side of the Washington Heights-Beverly border in the north, and the Brainerd station is on 89th Street between Loomis Boulevard and Bishop Street. The branch which cuts through the area has two stations. The rush-hour-only station, 95th Street–Longwood, is at South Vincennes Avenue and 95th Street; the other is the 103rd Street–Washington Heights station. All stations are in Zone C for fare-collection purposes.

The 95th/Dan Ryan station on the Chicago Transit Authority (CTA)'s Red Line, the 14th busiest rapid-transit station on the Chicago "L" in June 2019, is in adjacent Roseland. Local buses include the CTA 95, 103, and 112 routes with full-time service, and part-time service on the 108 CTA route and the 352 and 381 Pace routes.

=== Private transportation ===
Between 2015 and 2019, a plurality of occupied housing units (45.2 percent) had one vehicle available, compared to the citywide figure of 44.2 percent; 25.3 percent of units had two vehicles available, compared to the citywide figure of 21.8 percent. Three or more vehicles are available in 11.3 percent of housing units; 18.1 percent of units have none, compared to respective citywide figures of 7.0 and 26.9 percent. Most workers (62.1 percent) drove alone to work, compared to 48.8 percent citywide. The rest used other means of transportation; 22.8 percent took transit (compared to 28.2 percent citywide), 7.7 percent carpool, 1.0 percent walk or bicycle, and 3.0 percent use other modes. This compares with respective citywide figures of 7.7, 8.2, and 1.9 percent. In addition to the commuters, 3.5 percent worked from home compared to 5.2 percent citywide. Highly-walkable areas account for approximately 91 percent of people and jobs; the Chicago Metropolitan Agency for Planning defines such areas by population density, city-block length, tree-canopy cover, fatalities (or serious injuries) to pedestrians and bicyclists, density at intersections, and nearby amenities.

== Education ==
The area's first public school opened in 1874. J. A. Wadhams, who taught in a small, wood-frame building for the previous two years, was the first principal of the new school. Fort Dearborn School opened in 1928 in southeastern Brainerd, replacing an earlier school on 89th Street which had become overcrowded. The school was designed by Board of Education architect John C. Christensen, who had designed several other schools in nearby neighborhoods. Gilbert Wilkinson was its first principal, remaining there until 1933. The school became overcrowded again during the early 1970s due demographic changes, and an addition was built at that time. The school is a contributing property to the Bungalow Historic District. The Academy of Our Lady, known colloquially (and later officially) as "Longwood Academy", operated in the area from 1874 to 1999.

In the Chicago Public Schools system, Washington Heights contains Julian High School, Fort Dearborn School and the Kipling, Evers, Fernwood, Green, Wacker, Garvey and Mount Vernon Elementary Schools. The Chicago International Charter School, a charter school with locations throughout the city, has its Loomis elementary-school and Longwood high-school campuses in the area. In 2017 13.6 percent of the population aged 25 and older held a bachelor's degree, and 8.1 percent held a graduate or professional degree. A plurality of residents (30.7 percent) had some college education without a degree, and 29.2 percent were high-school graduates; 10.2 percent had not finished high school, and 8 percent had an associate's degree. Respective citywide figures were 22.3, 15.1, 17.7, 22.9, 16.2, and 5.7 percent.

In 2024, 26.5 percent of adults over the age of 25 had a bachelor's degree or higher, an increase from 16.4 percent in 2000. 91.3 percent of adults had graduated high school, an increase from 76.6 percent in 2000.

Washington Heights is home to the Carter G. Woodson Regional Library, a branch of the Chicago Public Library which opened in 1975. Named for African-American historian Carter G. Woodson, the library contains the Vivian G. Harsh Research Collection of Afro-American History and Literature (the largest collection of African-American history in the midwestern United States) and the sculpture Jacob's Ladder by South Side native Richard Hunt. After a 14-month renovation, it reopened in February 2018.

== Parks and recreation ==
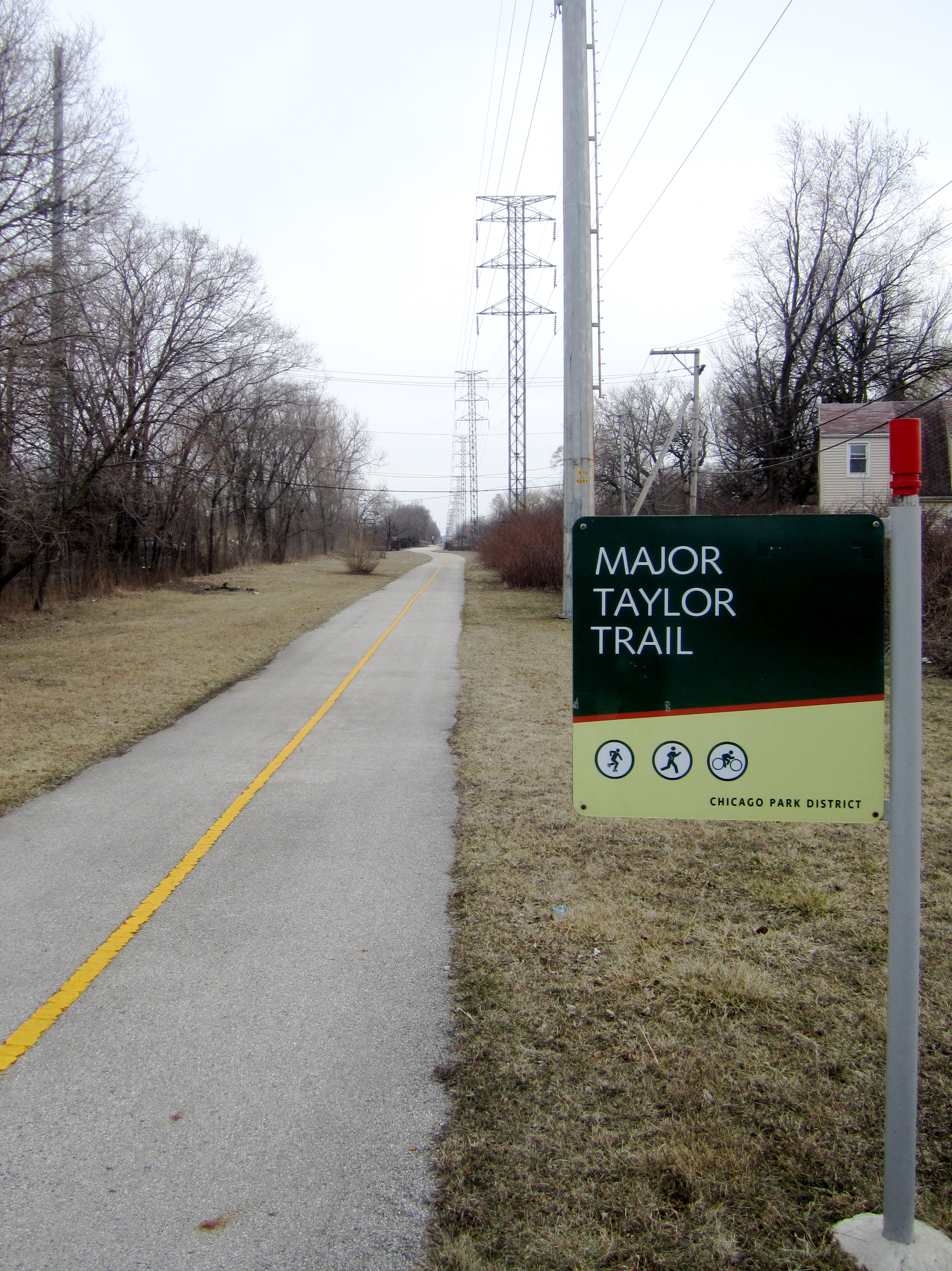
Major Taylor Trail

Portions of Washington Heights were part of the Ridge Park District before the 1934 amalgamation of 22 park districts into the Chicago Park District; other portions were part of the Fernwood Park District. It contains 2.16 accessible park acres (0.87 ha) per 1,000 residents, compared to a citywide figure of 2.42 acres (0.98 ha). The area includes Brainerd, Jackie Robinson, Euclid, Oakdale, and Joseph Robichaux Parks.

=== Brainerd Park ===
Brainerd Park is bounded by 91st and 92nd Streets, Racine Avenue and Throop Street. Although the Ridge Park District tried to purchase the open space for Brainerd Park from the Chicago Board of Education in 1932, the district had only made a down payment on the land by the time the park district was consolidated. The Chicago Park District completed the purchase in 1938, and quickly added athletic facilities and a fieldhouse. The original fieldhouse was demolished during the 1970s, and a new one was built to handle increasing youth needs. Brainerd Park is not a contributing property to the Bungalow Historic District due to its late completion, although it has been noted as always intended for community use. The park contains a water sprayer, tennis courts, a playground, a basketball court, a football and soccer field, a baseball and softball field, meeting rooms and assembly halls, and the fieldhouse. Jackie Robinson Park is on 107th Street. The Chicago Park District purchased land and established the park in 1957, while the Board of Education established Mount Vernon School. Originally named Mount Vernon Park, it was renamed in honor of Jackie Robinson in 1999. The park contains a basketball court, playgrounds, and a fieldhouse.

=== Euclid Park ===
Euclid Park was acquired by the Fernwood Park District during the late 1920s; originally known as Fernwood Commons, it was renamed Euclid Park after a nearby subdivision named for the mathematician. It contains tennis courts, a baseball field, a basketball court, a spray pool, a playground, a football and soccer field, a clubroom, and a fieldhouse. Oakdale Park is named for a nearby neighborhood named for a grove of oak trees in the vicinity; the site was purchased by the Chicago Park District in 1947, and was developed during the 1950s. It contains a picnic grove, a baseball field, a basketball court, a spray pool, a playground, a football and soccer field, a swimming pool, a clubroom, and a fieldhouse. Joseph Robichaux Park was created in the late 1960s from land adjacent to Chicago and Western Indiana Railroad tracks, and its development began in 1970. The park was named for Joseph J. Robichaux, a local alderman and county commissioner. It contains a tennis court, a playground, a water sprayer, a gymnasium, a basketball court, a baseball field, a clubroom, a fieldhouse, and Dusty Folwarczny's sculpture, Give.

=== Forest Preserve - Dan Ryan Woods ===
The Forest Preserve District of Cook County's Dan Ryan Woods are in Beverly, adjacent to the northwest corner of Washington Heights, and contains the Calumet Division Maintenance Headquarters. An abandoned stretch of railroad (formerly operated by Conrail) was converted into the 6-mile (9.7 km) Major Taylor Trail during the late 1990s, with the Chicago Park District leasing the trail from the city's Department of Transportation in 2006. The bikeway runs between the Dan Ryan Woods and the Whistler Woods in Riverdale, crossing Interstate 57 and the Calumet River. Part of the Southland Century Bike Network, it was reportedly underutilized in 2016. In 2018 a mural of Taylor and a quote of his was painted on a wall adjacent to the trail by Chicago artist Bernard Williams.

== Notable residents ==
- Kam Buckner (born 1985), member of the Illinois House of Representatives since 2019. He was raised in Washington Heights.
- Richard Driehaus (1942–2021) was raised in the Brainerd Historic Bungalow District, and was a vocal supporter and financier of preserved bungalow architecture in Chicago.
- Terrance Gainer (born 1947), law enforcement official and 38th Sergeant at Arms of the United States Senate (2007–2014). Gainer was raised in the Longwood Manor neighborhood.
- Byron Irvin (born 1966), professional basketball player who played for a number of teams (notably as a shooting guard for the Washington Bullets)
- Eddie T. Johnson (born 1960), 62nd Superintendent of the Chicago Police Department (2016–2019). His family moved to Washington Heights from the Cabrini–Green Homes when he was nine years old.
- Justin Slaughter, member of the Illinois House of Representatives. He was born in Washington Heights and currently resides in the community area.
