= 111th Street/Pullman station =

Commuter rail station in Chicago, Illinois

111th Street/Pullman

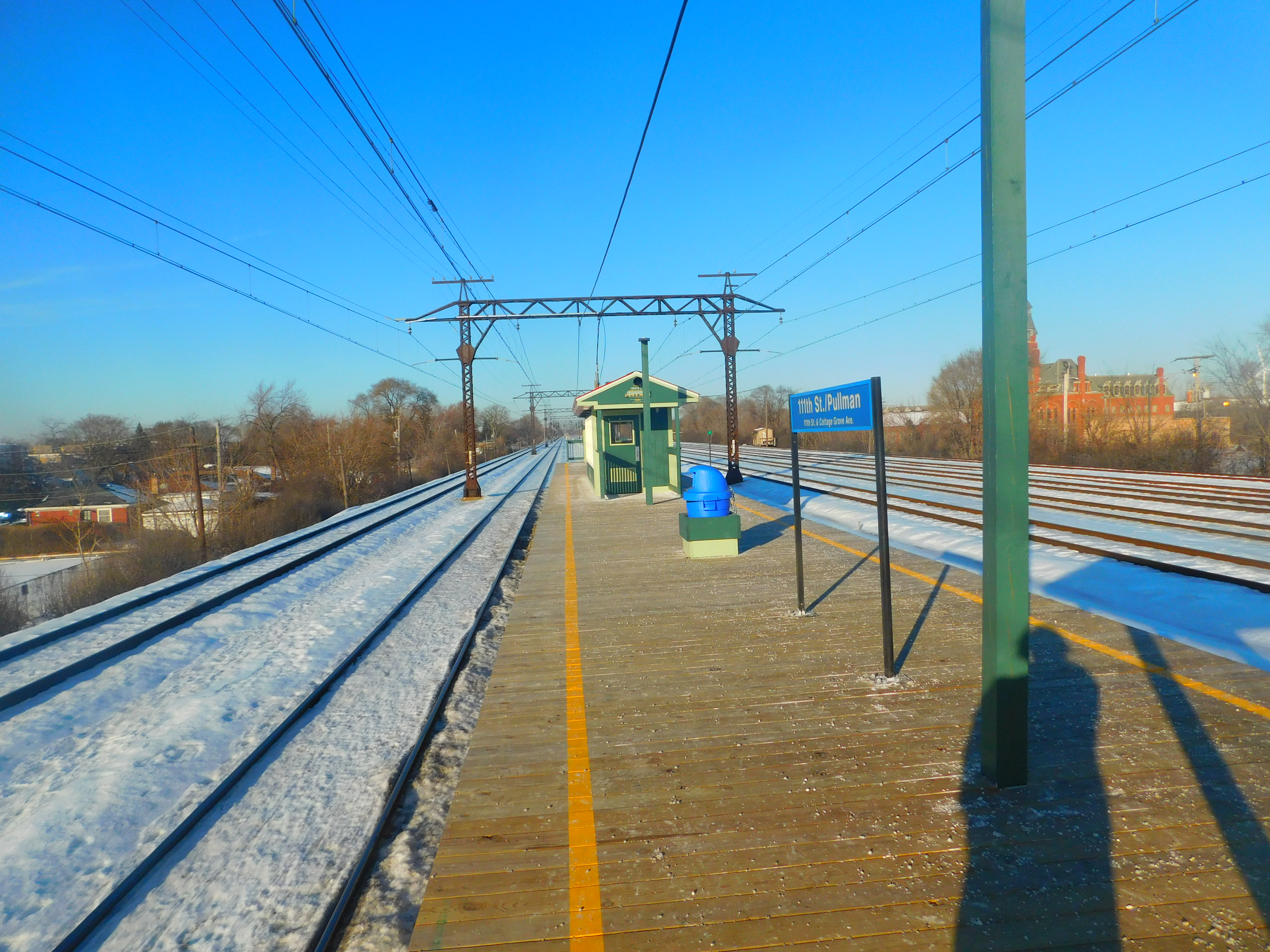
- The restored Pullman/111th street station in December 2016.

General information
- Location: 111th Street and Cottage Grove Avenue; Pullman, Chicago, Illinois
- Coordinates: 41.6929°N 87.6105°W
- Line: University Park Sub District
- Platforms: 1 Island platform
- Tracks: 4
- Connections: CTA Buses

Construction
- Parking: No
- Accessible: No

Other information
- Fare zone: 2

History
- Opened: 1916
- Electrified: 1926

Passengers
- 2018: 31 (average weekday) ▲29.2%
- Rank: 219 out of 236

Services
Preceding station	Metra	Following station
115th Street/Kensington toward University Park or Blue Island	Metra Electric Main Line & Blue Island Branch	107th Street toward Millennium
Former services
Preceding station	Illinois Central Railroad	Following station
115th Street toward Richton or Blue Island	Electric Suburban Main Line & Blue Island Branch	107th Street toward Randolph Street
Track layout
Location

111th Street/Pullman is a commuter rail station on Metra Electric's main branch in the Pullman neighborhood on the far south side of Chicago, Illinois. It is located at 111th Street and Cottage Grove Avenue, and is 14.0 miles (22.5 km) away from the northern terminus at Millennium Station. In Metra's zone-based fare system, 111th Street (Pullman) is in zone 2. As of 2018, the station is the 219th busiest of Metra's 236 non-downtown stations, with an average of 31 weekday boardings.

The station is little more than a platform between the tracks over a bridge with street-level connections. No parking is available at the station, however there is a connection to two of the Chicago Transit Authority's bus routes.

The station was renovated with a waiting shelter, custom signage, and a total makeover to attract more passengers to the nearby Pullman National Monument.

The station is scheduled to be completely reconstructed in the near future, modernizing it and making it ADA accessible.

== Bus connections ==
CTA

- 4 Cottage Grove
- 111A Pullman Shuttle
- 115 Pullman/115th
