= Anthony L. Krotiak =

United States Army Medal of Honor recipient

- Born: August 15, 1915; Chicago, Illinois, US
- Died: May 8, 1945 (aged 29); Balete Pass, Luzon, the Philippines
- Burial place: Holy Sepulchre Cemetery, Alsip, Illinois
- Military career
- Allegiance: United States
- Branch: United States Army
- Service years: 1941 - 1945
- Rank: Private First Class
- Units: 148th Infantry Regiment, 37th Infantry Division
- Conflicts: World War II
- Awards: Medal of Honor

Anthony L. Krotiak (August 15, 1915 – May 8, 1945) was a United States Army soldier and a recipient of the United States military's highest decoration—the Medal of Honor—for his actions in World War II.

== Biography ==
Krotiak joined the Army from his birth city of Chicago, Illinois, in November 1941, and by May 8, 1945, was serving as a private first class in Company I, 148th Infantry Regiment, 37th Infantry Division. On that day, in the Balete Pass, Luzon, the Philippines, he smothered the blast of a Japanese-thrown grenade with his body, sacrificing himself to protect those around him. For these actions, he was posthumously awarded the Medal of Honor the next year, on February 13, 1946.

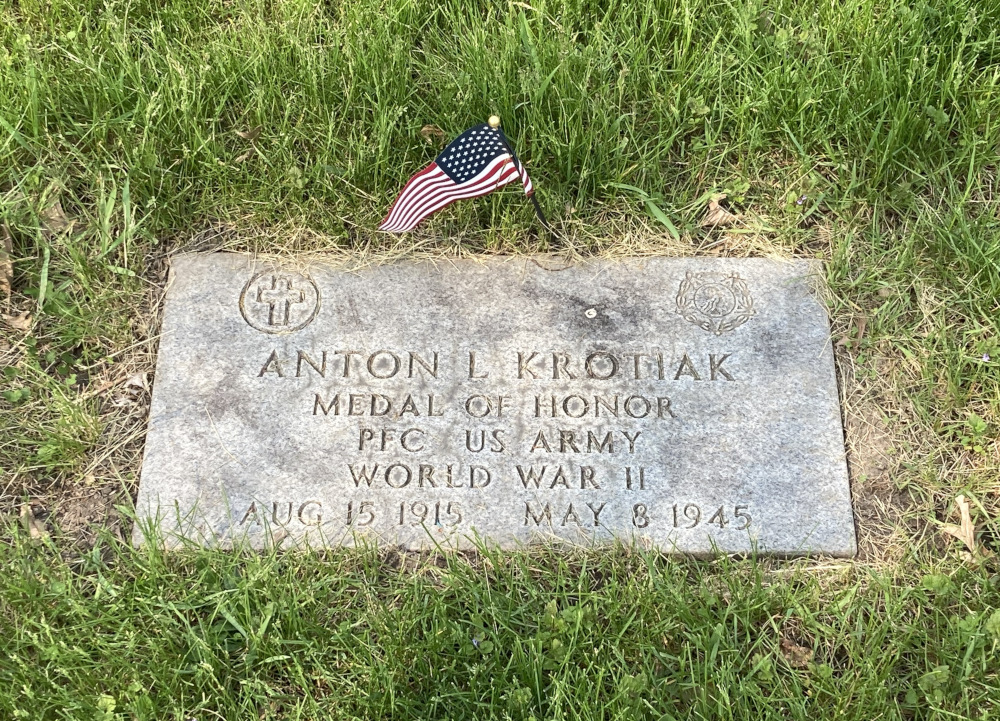
Krotiak's grave at Holy Sepulchre Cemetery

Krotiak, aged 29 at his death, was buried in Holy Sepulchre Cemetery, Alsip, Illinois.

== Medal of Honor citation ==
Private First Class Krotiak's official Medal of Honor citation reads:

He was an acting squad leader, directing his men in consolidating a newly won position on Hill B when the enemy concentrated small arms fire and grenades upon him and 4 others, driving them to cover in an abandoned Japanese trench. A grenade thrown from above landed in the center of the group. Instantly pushing his comrades aside and jamming the grenade into the earth with his rifle butt, he threw himself over it, making a shield of his body to protect the other men. The grenade exploded under him, and he died a few minutes later. By his extraordinary heroism in deliberately giving his life to save those of his comrades, Pfc. Krotiak set an inspiring example of utter devotion and self-sacrifice which reflects the highest traditions of the military service.

== Awards and decorations ==

Badge	Combat Infantryman Badge		
1st row	Medal of Honor	Bronze Star Medal	Purple Heart
2nd row	Army Good Conduct Medal	American Defense Service Medal	American Campaign Medal
3rd row	Asiatic-Pacific Campaign Medal with one campaign star	World War II Victory Medal	Philippine Liberation Medal

== See also ==
- List of Medal of Honor recipients for World War II
