= Frank L. Gillespie =

American businessman (1876–1925)

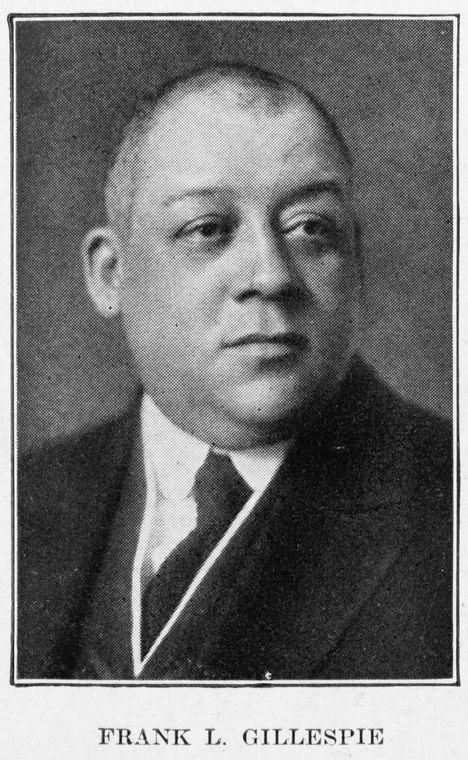
- Gillespie in 1925
- Born: November 8, 1876; Osceola, Arkansas, US
- Died: May 8, 1925 (aged 48); Chicago, Illinois, US

Frank L. Gillespie (November 8, 1876 – May 8, 1925) was a businessman who created the first African American-owned life insurance agency outside of the U.S. southern states. Gillespie had been an agent at Royal Life Insurance Company, a white-owned insurance agency, working in the "department for colored people" and noticed his customers were offered "inferior products." He met with a group of prominent black businessmen in Chicago and they worked together to create an insurance company catering towards Chicago's professional African American population.

His company, originally called Liberty Life Insurance—later called Supreme Liberty Life Insurance Company and finally Supreme Life Insurance Company—was incorporated in 1919 in Chicago. and offered whole life insurance to individuals, not just industrial policies. Gillespie worked hard to hire and train well-educated black agents, though sometimes he had to rely on part-timers who also worked in the postal service or the ministry. The company's headquarters, the Supreme Life Building, was built in 1921 by architect Albert Anis and is a designated Chicago landmark. Gillespie died as he was setting up the National Insurance Association, a professional association of black insurance firms.

== Personal life ==
Gillespie was married to Edreaner Poree of New Orleans, Louisiana. They had two children.

== Legacy ==
By 1960, Supreme was the third largest life insurance company in the United States owned by African Americans. The Gillespie Technology Magnet Cluster School in Chicago is named in his honor."
