= 107th Street station =

Commuter rail station in Chicago, Illinois

107th Street

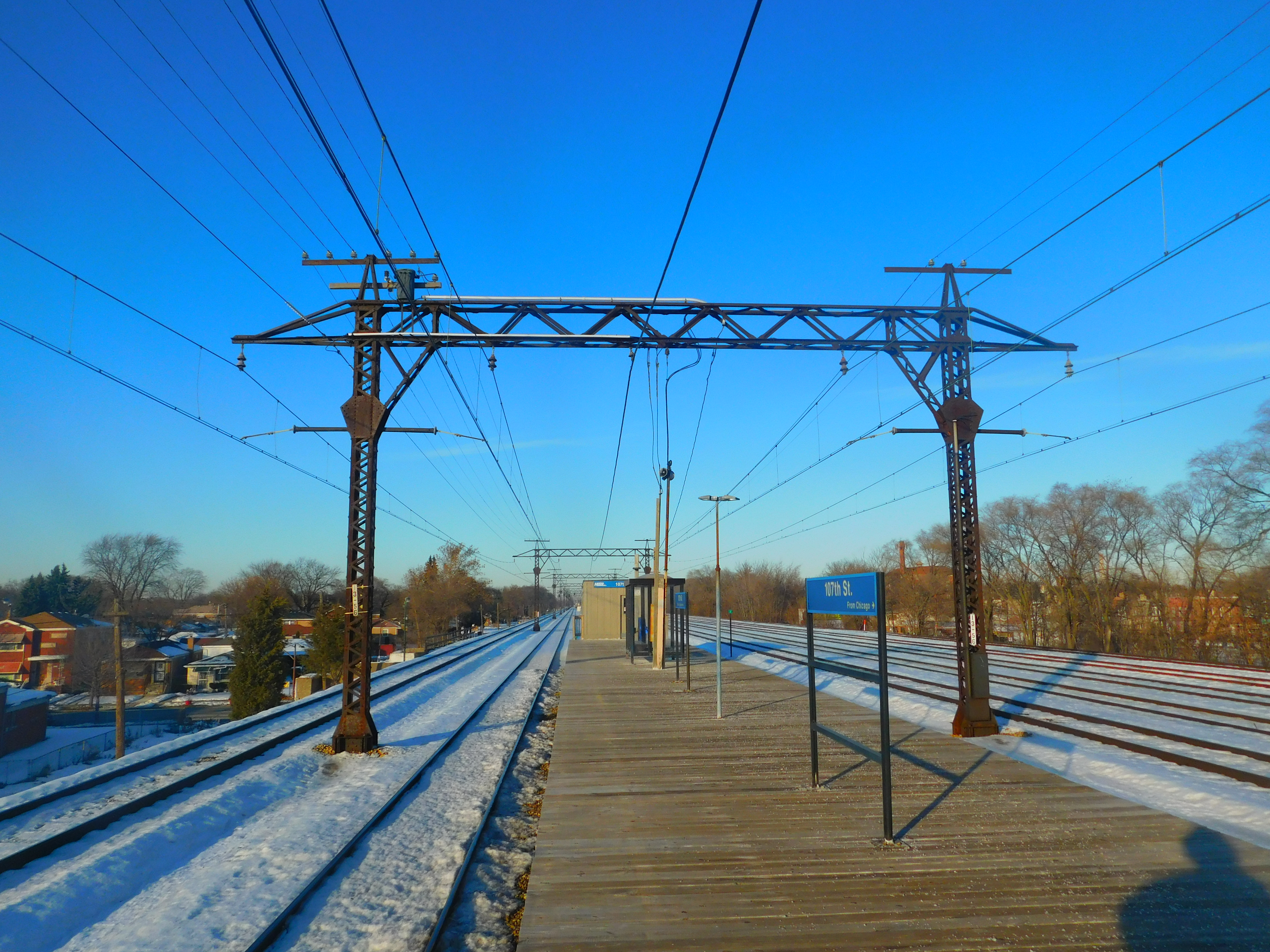
- 107th Street station in December 2016.

General information
- Location: 107th Street and Cottage Grove Avenue; Pullman, Chicago, Illinois
- Coordinates: 41.6997°N 87.6089°W
- Owner: Metra
- Line: University Park Sub District
- Platforms: 1 island platform
- Tracks: 4
- Connections: CTA buses

Construction
- Parking: No
- Accessible: No

Other information
- Fare zone: 2

History
- Electrified: 1926

Passengers
- 2018: 27 (average weekday) ▲42.1%
- Rank: 222 out of 236

Services
Preceding station	Metra	Following station
111th Street/Pullman toward University Park or Blue Island	Metra Electric Main Line & Blue Island Branch	103rd Street/Rosemoor toward Millennium
Former services
Preceding station	Illinois Central Railroad	Following station
111th Street toward Richton or Blue Island	Electric Suburban Main Line & Blue Island Branch	103rd Street toward Randolph Street
Track layout
Location

107th Street is a commuter rail station on Metra Electric's main branch in the Pullman neighborhood of Chicago. It is located at 107th Street and Cottage Grove Avenue, and is 13.5 miles (21.7 km) away from the northern terminus at Millennium Station. In Metra's zone-based fare system, 107th Street is in zone 2. As of 2018, the station is the 222nd busiest of Metra's 236 non-downtown stations, with an average of 27 weekday boardings. The station is a flag stop at all times.

The station consists of a wooden platform between the tracks over a bridge with street-level connections. No parking is available at the station; however, there is a connection to two of the Chicago Transit Authority's bus routes.

== Bus connections ==
CTA

- 4 Cottage Grove
- 115 Pullman/115th
