= Halloween Martin =

American disc jockey (1900–1971)

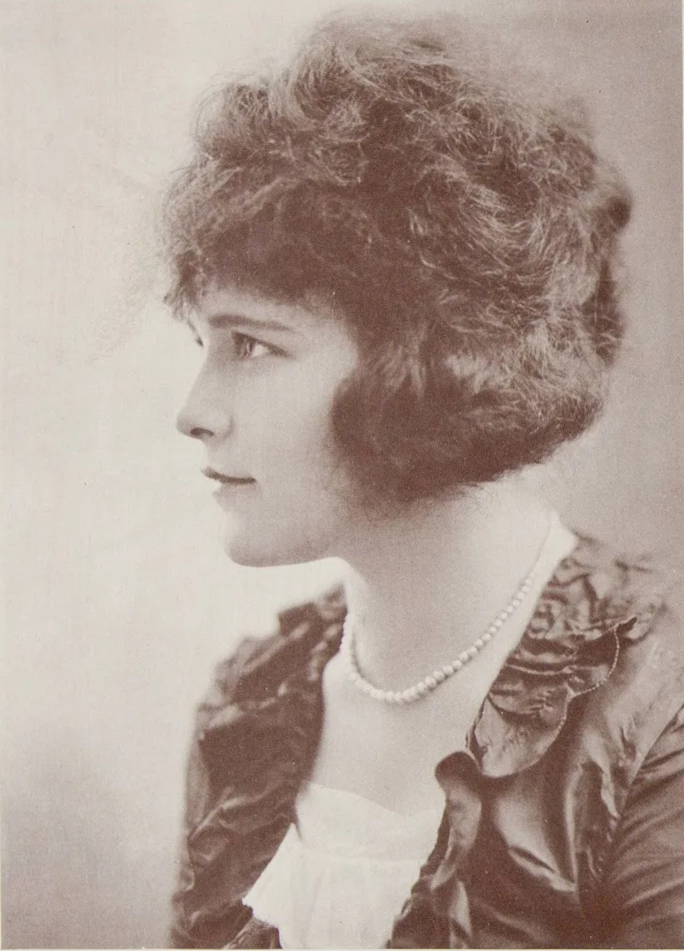
- Martin in 1926
- Born: Halloween Joan Martin; October 31, 1900; El Paso, Texas, US
- Died: July 29, 1971 (aged 70); Cook County, Illinois, US
- Education: DePaul University
- Occupation: Broadcaster
- Known for: First woman DJ, first morning radio program
- Spouse: Le Roy Eugene Kurtzeborn (Note: For the correct spelling of Le Roy Kurtzeborn's name, see his 1942 draft card.)
- Presenting career
- Show: Musical Clock
- Stations: KYW; WBBM; WCFL
- Style: Morning show

Halloween Joan Martin Kurtzeborn (October 31, 1900 – July 29, 1971) was an American broadcast announcer and radio disc jockey. She was one of the first radio disc jockeys in Chicago and an early innovator in what became known as morning radio. Active from 1929 to 1946 on her show the Musical Clock, Martin broadcast from three radio stations for almost two decades beginning with KYW, then WBBM, and finally WCFL where she retired from broadcasting. In the early 1930s, it was estimated that she had an audience of more than 1.5 million radio listeners. Historian Donna Halper credits Martin as the first woman to host her own morning radio show, with music scholar Maren Hancock calling Martin one of the first modern DJs.

== Early life ==
Halloween Joan Martin was born in El Paso, Texas, on Halloween in 1900 to a Canadian-born father, physician and dentist George Gordon Martin, and a Texas-born mother, Mabel Clare Kountz. She told the Associated Press that she went without a name for months until her parents chose the unusual birth-circumstance-inspired name. Martin grew up in the Lincoln Park neighborhood of Chicago with her brother Gordon, where she attended DePaul High School for Girls. She later matriculated at DePaul University, where she acted and performed with the drama club and wrote essays (Note: See for example "Little, But O My!" (1921), a humorous personal essay about the pin.) for The Minerval, the DePaul literary magazine. She also studied liberal arts, graduating in 1926 with an AB.

== Career ==
After university, Martin joined the Chicago Herald and Examiner as a staff writer and columnist where she contributed to interior decorating content for the Prudence Penny column. Her editor also hosted a radio program on the same subject, and when they were unable to host one day, Martin was asked to substitute. Her appearance was well received, and she was subsequently given a 20-minute segment, at what was then known as WEBH. She also began broadcasting on WJJD sometime around 1927. Commercial radio broadcasting was an entirely new medium in the 1920s and was still experimenting with different formats and approaches after its emergence from amateur radio restrictions of World War I, which were only lifted in late 1919.

Previous to Martin's entry to the field and the war, non-commercial, amateur radio enthusiasts had been transmitting various types of live and recorded music since the 1910s. Just months after broadcasts were allowed again, amateur radio broadcaster and Westinghouse engineer Frank Conrad set up 8XK, a radio station where he played music from his personal phonograph record collection. Conrad's experiments were instrumental in Westinghouse's foray into commercial radio, with the company establishing the first station in 1921 in Pittsburgh, followed by KYW in Chicago that same year. Martin's entry to radio came just six years later. Cultural critic Susan J. Douglas describes radio at that time as a "deeply sexist industry in which it was gospel that people did not like and would not trust the female voice over the air."

Nevertheless, women were heard, but only in gender-defined roles related to home economics. Before Martin was brought on board, popular woman's voices on KYW included Anna J. Peterson, likely the first woman to host cooking programs on American radio, and Leona Alford Malek, who hosted a popular weekly home economics program. In the early 1920s, there were no morning shows on American radio, as the industry initially designed programming only for evening listening, a slot primarily designed for men, but also for shared family listening time. Some stations began to slowly expand their programming, at first to the middle of the day, and finally to the morning slot about a decade later.

=== Musical Clock ===
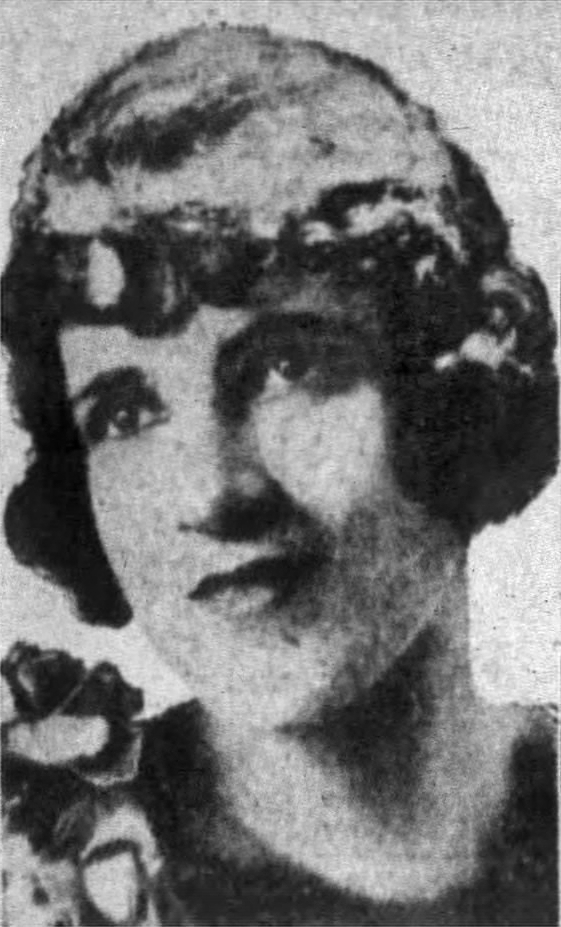
Halloween Martin in a publicity photo for the Musical Clock (1931)

A new morning show format appeared on American radio in mid-1928. Called the "musical clock", the format began broadcasting on several different stations, including WCAO in Baltimore, Maryland, followed by WRHF in Washington, D.C. In July of that year, WRHF announced the purpose of the new format: "to 'pep up' Government workers for their day's work with music and at the same time warn them of the fleeting minutes so they will report for duty on time." Media scholar Alexander Russo notes that the musical clock format arose as a form of time discipline in early radio, and quickly became standardized across the industry due to its inexpensive production costs, wide appeal, and adaptability to other stations.

KYW station manager Homer Hogan applied the new musical clock format to his station in 1929. At that time, Martin had already been an experienced radio broadcaster on home decorating for several years. Hogan asked Martin to play phonograph records in the morning, interspersed with her announcing the time every five minutes. This led to Martin becoming the host and DJ of one of the first popular morning shows in Chicago. Martin hosted the Musical Clock on KYW as a two-hour program beginning in early 1929 at 1020 kilocycles (equivalent to 1020 kHz on the AM band today). Chicago department store retailer Marshall Field became the show's first sponsor a year later, in April 1930.

The Musical Clock gave Martin the freedom to work as a nascent disc jockey, choosing her own music and writing her own scripts. She would awake early each morning to prepare for the show. During the program, Martin would play, what writer Arnold Passman describes as "light, yet lively music", according to the needs of her audience. This included popular music, musical comedy, classical, and jazz music. As the program played, Martin would announce the time every five minutes, and play four commercials every hour, selling the offerings of the advertisers to listeners with an informed, and educated perspective on the product at a time when radio executives said it was impossible for women to sell products effectively. Later on, Martin added announcements about the temperature and weather. Audience reception was overwhelmingly positive, with the radio stations and networks monitoring the mail and the feedback closely. One listener described Martin as "the voice with a smile".

KYW's Waldo Warren put together one of the first radio listening surveys of Martin's program in 1932, based on more than 2,000 listeners who had written to the station. A conservative back-of-the-envelope calculation based on these numbers suggested that Martin had an audience of more than 1.5 million listeners. When KYW left Chicago for Philadelphia in 1934, Martin's fanbase persuaded other stations to keep her on the air. She was re-hired by the Columbia Broadcasting System on WBBM that same year. Martin's theme song for her show was "In a Clock Store" (1893), a novelty descriptive piece by composer Charles J. Orth.

By 1938, Marshall Field claimed Martin had come close to holding "the all-time record for the greatest number of broadcast hours of any program on any station or chain in the country", announcing 70,000 songs in 4,700 hours of radio broadcasting. The next year, Sears, Roebuck and Co. became the new sponsor, with Marshall Field unsuccessfully trying to win back the show. Martin remained at WBBM until 1944. She then moved to WCFL for a 30-minute show, where she announced six times a week, sponsored by the Stineway Drug Company. Radio disc jockey Norman Ross, who started the same year as Martin, was her competitor in the morning radio slot over at WMAQ. Other competitors with similar shows included Frank Cope on The Alarm Klok Klub on KJBS in San Francisco.

=== Retirement ===
Radio personality Mal Bellairs described Martin as "the most nervous person" he had ever known in the radio business. Martin herself admitted to experiencing issues attributed to the demands of the tight radio format. The time-restricted show proved to be particularly stressful for Martin. "This was somewhat frustrating for a ham like me," she later recalled. "But it wasn't as easy as it sounded, and I did have a couple of breakdowns. Once I made a mistake and advertised a $47 or $57 mattress for $27. They sold extremely well, of course, but I don't imagine the company made anything." Due to the stress, Martin's physician recommended she retire, which she finally did in 1946.

== Personal life ==
Halloween and her husband in their 1910 Hupmobile wearing period-specific costumes (1958)

Martin married Le Roy E. Kurtzeborn, a classic car enthusiast and member of the Model T Ford Club International. As Chicagoans suffered under the Great Depression, Martin performed fundraising and charity work for the needy on behalf of the private Joint Emergency Relief Fund of Cook County in the early 1930s. The couple reportedly lived in Chicago's Old Town in the 1950s, where they enjoyed antique car shows together and would often dress up in vintage driving costumes for authenticity. The Chicago Tribune published a photo of the couple at a car show in their red 1910 Hupmobile. The car won numerous awards in the 1950s.

Martin also expressed an interest in numismatics, with the Chicago Coin Club listing her as a member. She was active in the club for several years, writing and producing live entertainment for at least two of the club's banquets and serving as second vice president.

Martin died in Chicago in July 1971. Her husband outlived her by eight years.

The Martin family owned a farmhouse just outside of Medaryville, Indiana, with most of its members buried in the town of nearby Winamac.

== See also ==
- History of radio disc jockeys
- Jack L. Cooper
- Rambling with Gambling
