= Mary Mills =

Mary Mills may refer to:

- Mary Mills (golfer) (born 1940), American retired professional golfer
- Mary Mills (soprano) (born 1964), American opera singer
- Mary Lee Mills (1912–2010), American nurse
- Bernice Redington (1891–1966), cookery writer using pen-name Mary Mills

== See also ==
- Mary Mills Mississippi Gulf Coast Invitational
