= In a Clock Store =

1893 composition by Charles J. Orth

- by Charles J. Orth
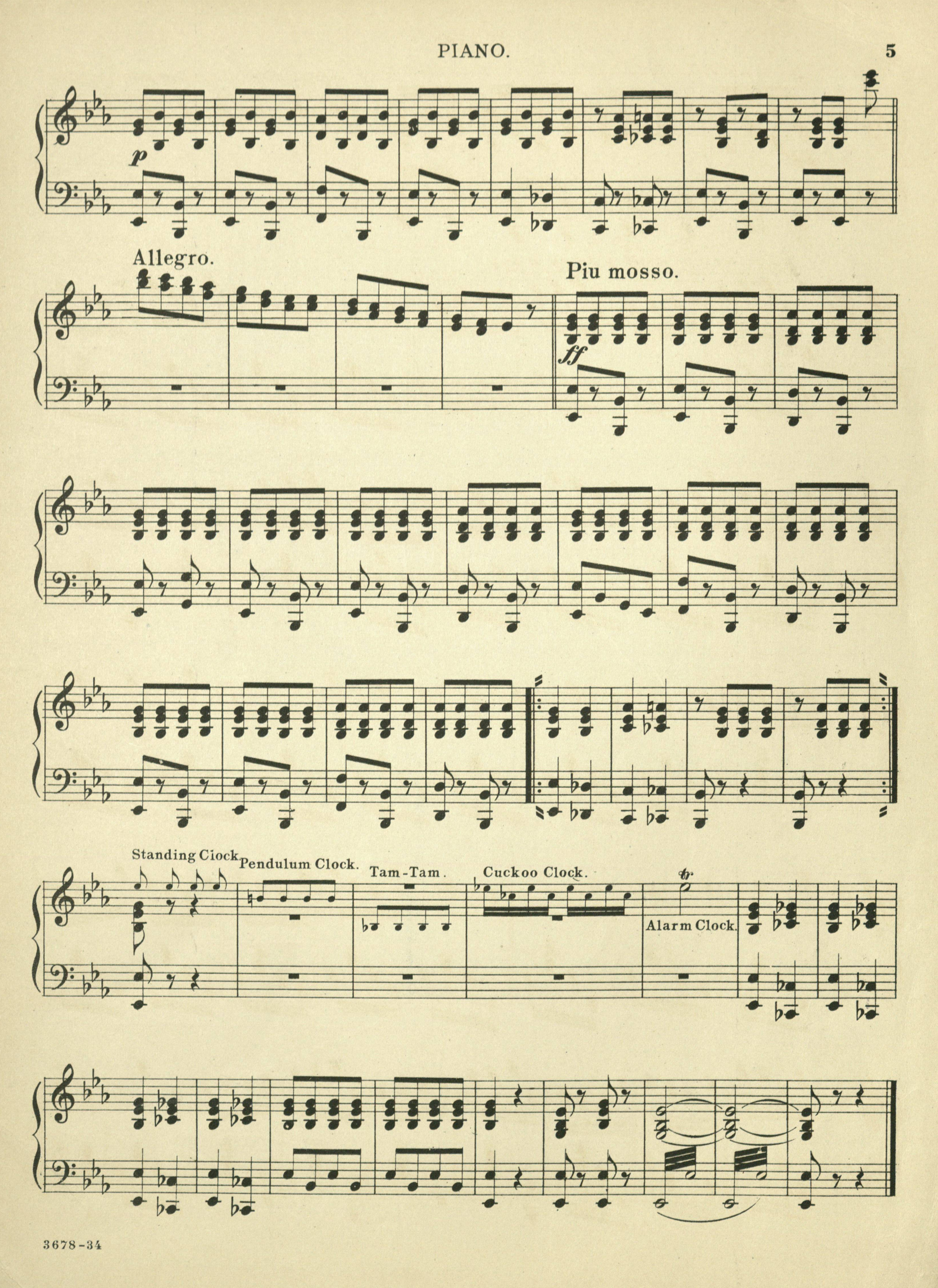
- The final page of the piano score showing five different clock sounds
- Key: E-flat major
- Published: 1893
- Recorded: 1902 Columbia Records

"In a Clock Store (Im Uhrenladen)", also known as "In the Clock Store", is an 1893 novelty descriptive piece by American composer Charles J. Orth. It is written in the key of E♭ major as a descriptive fantasy in 3/4 time. It was originally published for piano and later issued in other arrangements, including full orchestra, military orchestra, piano accompaniment, and reduced ensembles for 10 or 14 instruments. It is generally categorized as light music.

Described as humoresque, it was part of the standard repertoire of the Sousa Band conducted by bandleader John Philip Sousa and was prominently featured by Sousa in performances at the Chicago World's Fair and in his European tours. International reception was mixed, but the music remained popular with American audiences.

It was the first ever work to appear on a disc record in the Columbia Records catalog in 1902, with Sousa playing it in a command performance for Edward VII the following year. It later became part of the theatre organ repertoire during the silent film era, and was often performed between films or during coming attractions. As talkies took over in the 1930s, it was first used in an early Walt Disney sound cartoon, The Clock Store. The song found new life in the theater organ revival of the 1950s.

== Description ==
An apprentice opens the clock store. Ticking clocks can be heard striking all at once, including a cuckoo clock and a grandfather clock. The apprentice can be heard whistling. Several clocks run down and are rewound. A musical clock plays a popular tune. Four o'clock strikes on many different clocks, from a miniature Dresden to a large Scotch cathedral outside. Arrangements of the song depict these activities, with instruments mimicking bells, cuckoo clocks, tam-tam, alarm clocks, and whistles. Mechanical actions like the clock running down, the boy winding the clock, and the movement of standing and pendulum clocks are represented through instrumental effects, rhythmic patterns, and dynamics. A footnote on the percussion score for theatre orchestra indicates that the trombonist can sound the gong while the cuckoo and bells can be imitated by other members of the band as needed. When the song was performed, the audience was often provided with a narration of the piece in the program notes. This style found favor with popular audiences.

== Background ==
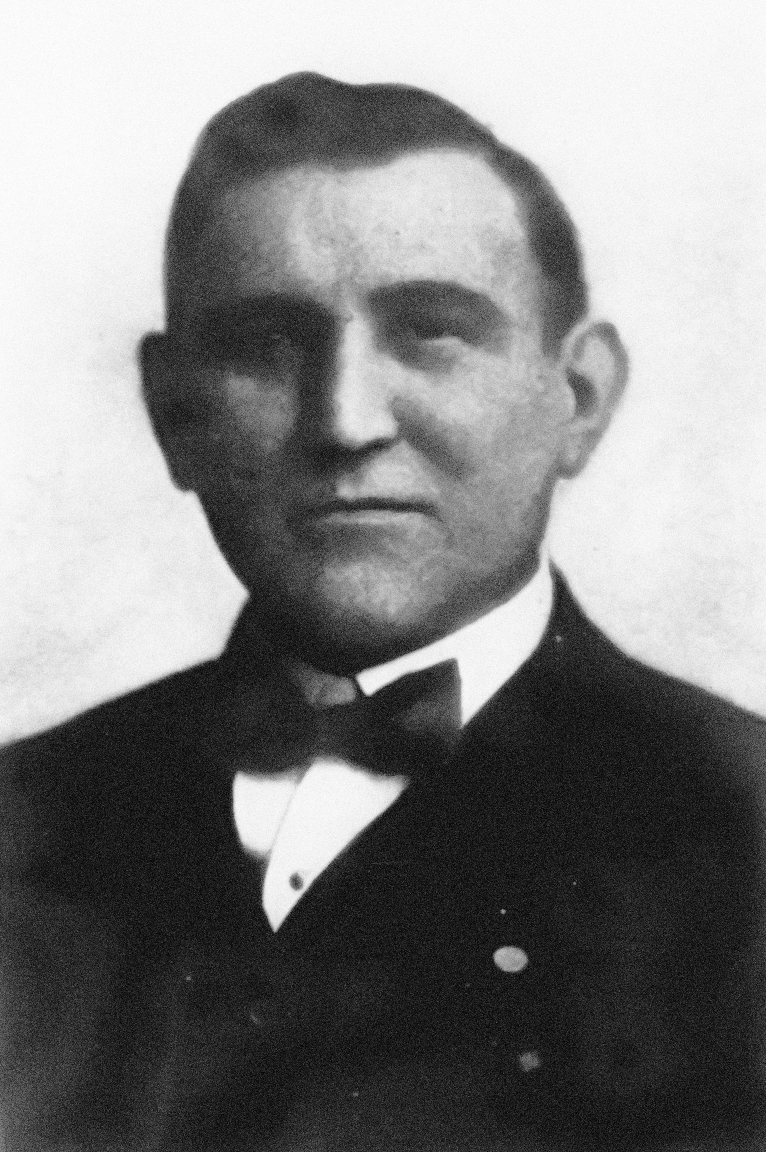
Orth c.1919

Charles J. Orth (11 April 1867 – 1 February 1921) was born and raised in Milwaukee, Wisconsin, where he was a student of Otto Von Gumpert, who had studied under Carl Reinecke. Orth went on to study under Hugo Kaun and later, Franz Neumann. Orth wrote "In a Clock Store" at the age of 16, which was played by the Sousa Band beginning around 1893, with notable performances at the Chicago World's Fair. The song was also performed internationally and recorded many times.

Orth composed and published at least 19 songs during his lifetime, including medleys, marches, and waltzes, with notable performances of "The Spanish Beggar Girl", "The Capture of Santiago", "Love's Melody", and "On the Battlefield of Life". He was known for only two songs during his lifetime: "In a Clock Store" and "In a Bird Store". "In a Clock Store" is considered his most memorable composition.

== Arrangements ==
Many different arrangements of the piece are known. Milwaukee composer and conductor Christopher Bach (1835–1927) arranged the original piece for Orth in 1893. A Bach arrangement for silent film orchestra popular in the 1920s comprises a mixed ensemble of woodwinds (2 clarinets, 2 oboes, bassoon), brass (2 cornets, 2 horns, trombone), strings (1st and 2nd violins, viola, cello, bass), percussion (drums, bells), and piano. Composer Frank Churchill arranged excerpts of the song in 1931 for the short Walt Disney film The Clock Store. Additional arrangements came much later, with John W. Schaum arranging a version for piano in 1951, followed by versions arranged by Ben Vito (1955) and Weber (1958).

== Reception ==
Victor Orchestra (1907)
In a Clock Store
Acoustic recording, 12-inch 78 rpm disc

Reception was mixed, with American audiences enjoying Orth's tone painting, while European audiences were far more critical of the genre. British music critics were particularly hostile to the song. In spite of this, European musicians performed the song in their own countries with their own bands.

== Use in early cinema ==
The song featured widely in early motion picture history in the 20th century. According to the Estes Park Museum, a 1921 Victor recording of the song was used in the historic Park Theatre in Colorado, the oldest operating cinema in the western United States, to provide a soundtrack for what was then called coming attractions or trailers. Similar use occurred in the United Kingdom.

== Selected recordings ==
"In a Clock Store" is the first ever disc record listed in The Columbia Master Book Discography. It was likely recorded in 1901 but only released in 1902. It is listed as Volume 1, matrix number 1, record number 1 in the Columbia catalog. Many different recordings exist. Herbert Griffiths and his orchestra recorded a version of it in 1928 at the Stoll Picture Theatre. One of the most recent recordings is by the Royal Philharmonic Orchestra in 1968.

Year	Artist	Label	Size	A/B-side	Matrix No.	Ref
1902	Climax Orchestra	Columbia	7-in.; 10-in.	Blank	1	
1906	Hager's Orchestra	Zonophone		Blank	432	
1907	Victor Orchestra	Victor	10-in.; 12-in.	"A hunt in the black forest"	B-4219; C-4219	
1916	Sodero's Band	Edison	10-in.	"The Nightingale and the Frog"	4982	
1922	Miniature Concert Orchestra	Brunswick	12-in.		X7643	
1924	Band of the Grenadier Guards	Columbia	12-in.		AX835	
1924	Aeolian Concert Orchestra	Vocalion		"A hunt in the black forest"	A35028	
1925	Sutherland Orchestra	Beltona		"Pomp and Circumstance"	5015	
1926	Metropolitan Orchestra	His Master's Voice	12-in.		C376	
1938	Band of the Coldstream Guards	Gramophone	10-in.		0EA1169	

== Other uses ==
Radio disc jockey Halloween Martin used a version as the theme song for her morning show Musical Clock in the 1930s.

== See also ==
- Program music
