= Florence E. Kollock =

American Universalist minister (1848–1925)

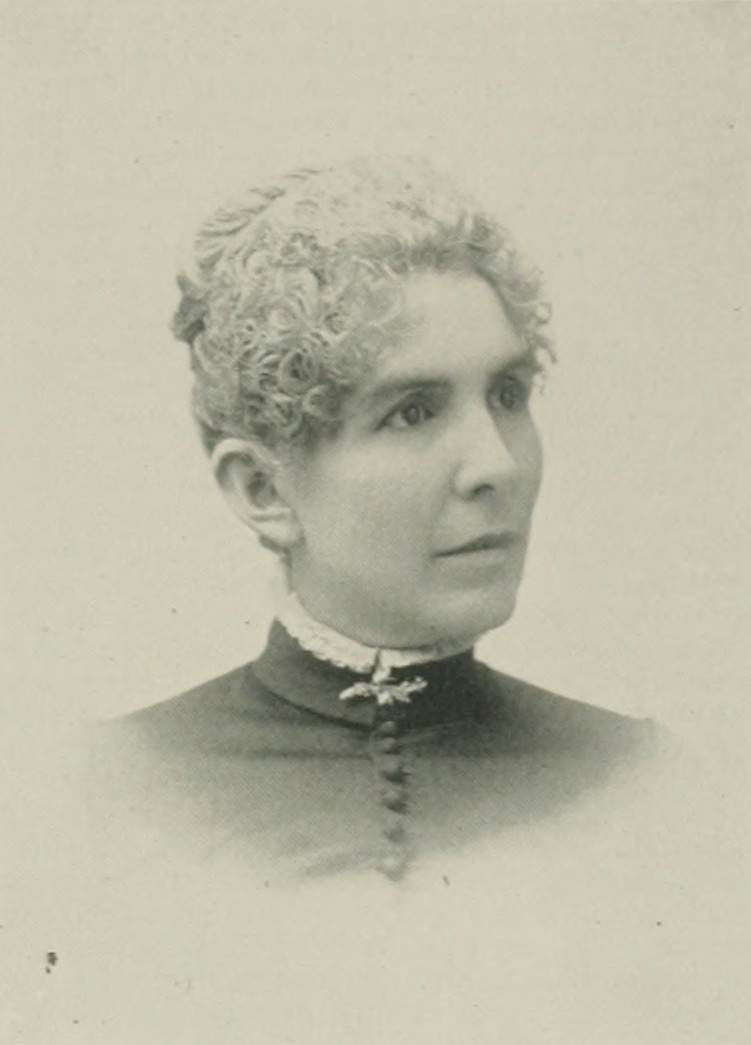
"A Woman of the Century"

Florence E. Kollock (after marriage, Florence Kollock-Crooker; January 19, 1848 – April 21, 1925) was an American Universalist minister and lecturer. She organized and served as pastor of the Stewart Avenue Universalist Church (now known as the Beverly Unitarian Church), Chicago, 1878–92. She subsequently served as pastor of the Universalist Church, Pasadena, California, 1892–95, where, with a membership of nearly 500, it was the largest congregation in the world under the charge of a woman. From 1904 till September 1910, she was the pastor of St. Paul's Universalist Church, Jamaica Plain (Boston), Massachusetts. Kollock served as President of the Woman's Centenary Association, (later, the Association of Universalist Women), 1902–3. She lectured extensively in the U.S. and abroad on sociological and philanthropic problems. She was prominent in all reformatory and educational work, including the temperance movement and women's suffrage.

== Early life and education ==
Florence Ellen Kollock was born in Waukesha, Wisconsin, January 19, 1848. (Note: According to the Dictionary of Unitarian and Universalist Biography, an on-line resource of the Unitarian Universalist History & Heritage Society, Kollock was born January 18, 1848.) Her parents were William Edward and Ann Margaret (Hunter) Kollock, she being a native of England.

Florence's parents felt that the daughters should be given an equal chance in life with the sons. All of them graduated from the State University at Madison and went into professional life. Dr. Mary Kollock Bennett, Kollock's oldest sister, was the first woman who matriculated at the Ann Arbor Medical College. The next in point of age, Dr. Harriet Kollock, was one of the first women who graduated from the same college. The third sister, Dr. Jennie Kollock, was the second woman who graduated in dentistry at Ann Arbor. Of the three brothers, one was a lawyer, one was a school principal, and one was a dentist.

== Career ==
For the first five years after graduation, Kollock worked as a school teacher. It was the development of her deeply sympathetic nature in this work that made her feel that she could do a broader work in the Christian ministry. It also seemed to her that the pulpit needed women. Her parents were Universalists, and as that was the first denomination to open its educational institutions and grant ordination to women, she chose that denomination and took her theological course at St. Lawrence University, in Canton, New York. While a student at St. Lawrence, Kollock came to Rochester, New York early in the summer of 1874, and preached for the Universalist Society about three months. She graduated from the St. Lawrence's theological department in 1875.

=== Wisconsin and Illinois ===
After Kollock graduation from St. Lawrence, she was regularly engaged in the work of the Universalist ministry. She began preaching at Waverly, Wisconsin, in 1876. She remained at Waverley two years, and then followed the Rev. Augusta Jane Chapin as pastor of the Universalist church at Blue Island, Illinois, one of Chicago's suburbs. During her pastorate there, she established a mission at Englewood, Illinois, another community area of Chicago. After the regular morning service at Blue Island, Kollock was in the habit of traveling a distance between 8–10 miles (13–16 km) in any vehicle which by chance she could command, or other means failing her, of making the distance on foot. The little group which first gathered about her rapidly increased in numbers until within a year, a church was formed in Englewood and she became its pastor, removing there in 1879. She received an Honorary A.M. degree from the University of Wisconsin in 1882.

Her first congregation in Englewood numbered fifteen, who met in Masonic Hall. Kollock's ability as an organizer was felt everywhere, in the flourishing Sunday-school, numbering over 300, which ranked high in regular attendance and enthusiasm, and in the various other branches of church work, which was reduced to a system. Endowed with strong personal magnetism, she soon displayed the ability to draw to her work those who had imagined themselves "too broad for any church", or those whose early church discipline had caused them to avoid all churches in later life. While church-going in that day was often left by the husbands to the women of the family, it was not so in Kollock's church, which contained an unusual proportion of men, young and old. Her ministry in the Englewood community area of Chicago covered a continuous period of about fourteen years, during which time she built two church edifices, the last being the Stewart Avenue Universalist Church. She always wore black in the pulpit, alternating broadcloth in the winter, for silk or lace in the summer.

In 1890, she vacationed in Wisconsin and then returned to the pulpit of the Englewood Universalist church on 65th Street where she discussed "The Bennett Law and the Public School Issue in Wisconsin". She was in Washington, D.C. in March 1891 at a meeting of the Woman's National Suffrage Association where she joined a committee appointed to confer with the Board of Lady Managers of the World's Columbian Exposition intent on launching an active campaign in the southern states.

=== Travel abroad ===
It was announced in November 1891 that Kollock had resigned from her thirteen years' pastorate at the Universalist church in Englewood to spend a year abroad, the resignation being effective February 1892. Her travel and study plans were to Europe, Egypt, and the Holy Land. She busied herself with lectures at the University of Oxford and the British Museum, and writing a series of articles on co-education in Europe for home papers. At the British Museum, she was also a student of Egyptology and Assyrian archaeology.

=== Pasadena ===
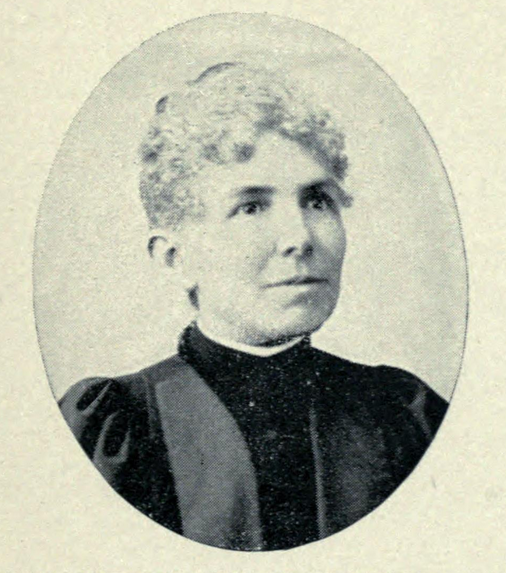
Florence E. Kollock

Upon her return to the U.S., in February 1893, she was appointed assistant pastor of the Universalist Church at Pasadena, California, that church becoming the strongest Universalist church on the Pacific Coast. The following month, she participated in the California State Convention of Universalists, in Santa Paula. In May 1893, at the World's Columbian Exposition's religious services, Kollock and seventeen other ordained women ministers sat in the front row of the speaker's platform in the Washington Hall. In October, Kollock opened the second day's proceedings of the World's Congress of Representative Women with prayer. She also read papers on various topics including, "Woman in the Pulpit", and "How All Our Women Can Help". Kollock attended the California State Convention of Universalists in early June 1894 in Pasadena. In mid-June, she tendered her resignation from the Universalist parish in Pasadena with the intent to leave shortly for her old home in Chicago, but she returned to the Pasadena pulpit in September. At the Woman's Parliament of Southern California, October 1894, Kollock read her paper on "What the Public Schools Should Teach". In May 1895, she again tendered her resignation.

=== Massachusetts, Montana, Michigan ===
Kollock was in Boston in July 1895, representing the Young People's Christian Union, at the World's Christian Endeavor Union, speaking on, "The Latent Power of Universalism". By November, she was in Boston, beset with invitations to fill pulpits and conduct meetings, such as addressing the theological students at Tufts College (now Tufts University) and opening the New England Woman's Club as the guest of its president, Julia Ward Howe.

On June 18, 1896, Kollock married Dr. Rev. Joseph Henry Crooker (1850–1931), a Unitarian clergyman of Helena, Montana. Subsequently, she engaged in pastoral work in that state. In November, she was elected corresponding secretary of the Montana branch of the Equal Suffrage Association. Soon thereafter, they removed to Troy, New York, where Joseph took up a pastorate. Kollock-Crooker served as assistant organizer with Dr. George Landor Perrin in the philanthropic and educational work of Boston's Universalist church known as the Every-Day Church on Shawmut Avenue, and by May 1897, served as its pastor.

In 1899, they relocated to Ann Arbor, Michigan. In October, Kollock-Crooker was back in Boston, representing the Unitarian and Universalist denominations in missionary work for Michigan, and addressing the Massachusetts woman suffrage association on "What Disfranchised Citizens Can do for Home and Country". In 1902, in Auburn, New York, Kollock-Crooker was elected president of the Woman's Centenary Association of the Universalist Church during its annual convention. It served as the women's national missionary society of the Universalist Church. The Crookers traveled abroad the following year.

Kollock-Crooker was called to the Universalist church in Jamaica Plain, Massachusetts in 1904 and began her work there on November 1, Dr. Crooker becoming a co-worker in the religious life of Boston. She remained in the position till September 1910.

== Later life and death ==
In 1922, the Crookers bought an estate at Elgin, Illinois.

Kollock-Crooker died April 21, 1925.

== Selected works ==
- "The Kindergarten From a Minister's Standpoint", 1890
- "Their Unchristian Criticism", 1890
- "Woman in the Pulpit", 1893
