= Beverly Unitarian Church =

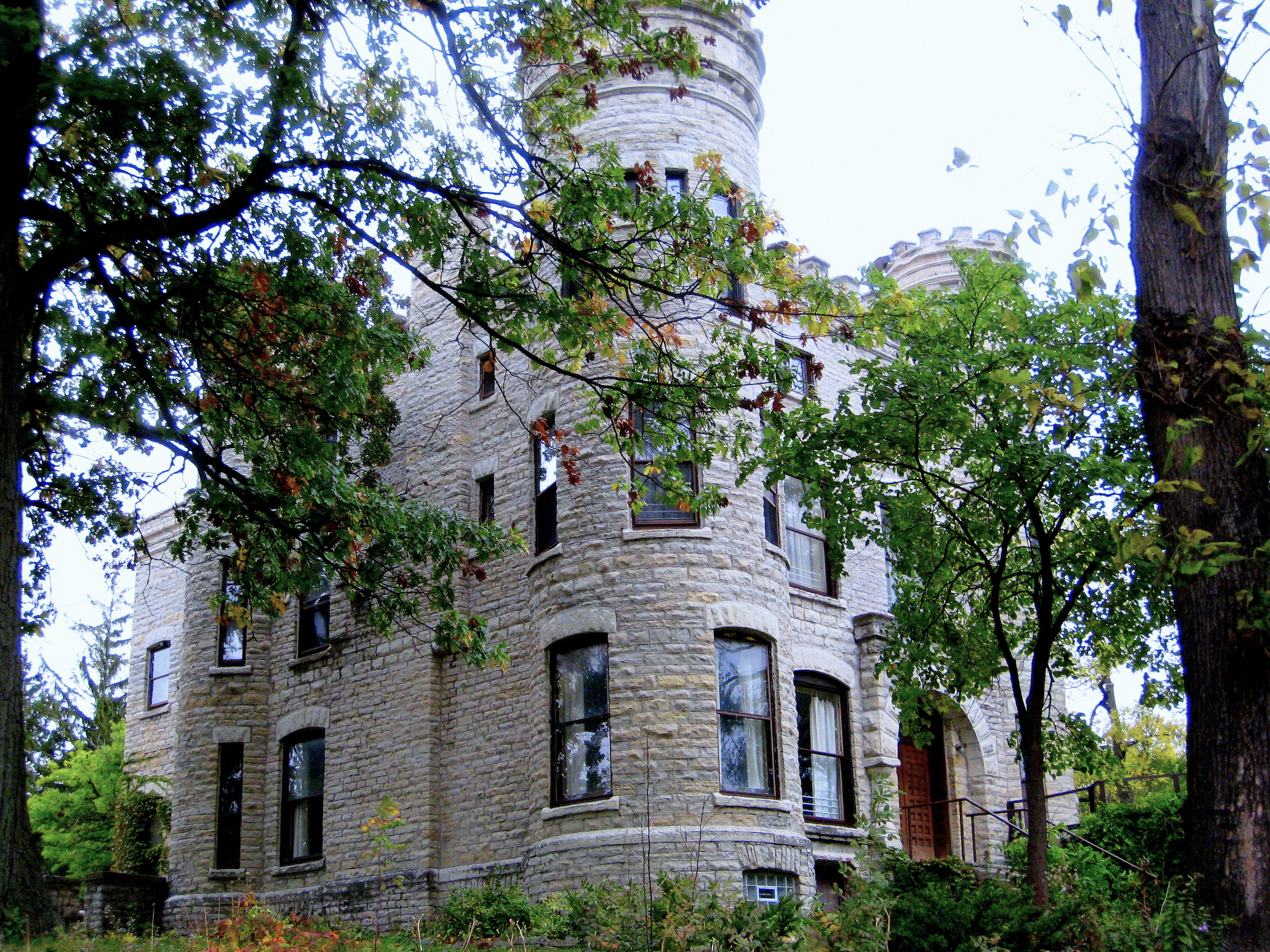
- The Givins Castle in 2007.
- Beverly Unitarian Church
- 41.706812°N 87.671336°W
- Location: 10244 South Longwood Drive; Beverly, Chicago, Illinois
- Country: United States
- Denomination: Unitarian Universalism
- Website: Beverly Unitarian Church

History
- Status: Church
- Founded: 1878

Architecture
- Functional status: Active

Beverly Unitarian Church is a Unitarian Universalist ("UU") church in Chicago, Illinois.

== History ==
The church was formed in 1951 by the merger of two congregations: the Beverly Unitarian Fellowship, which had begun in 1941, and the People's Liberal Church founded in 1878. People's Liberal Church was known by a variety of names over the years: In 1878 it was called the Unitarian Universalist Christian Union Society of Englewood, or simply the Christian Union Society; in 1880 on moving to a new building, it was named First Universalist Church of Englewood; in 1889 it moved to a larger building and was called Stewart Avenue Universalist Church.

Beverly Unitarian Church purchased the Givins Irish Castle building for $14,000 and has used it since 1942.

== Ministers ==
=== People's Church prior to merger ===
- 1878-1892 - Rev. Florence E. Kollock (at the People's Liberal Church of Chicago, then called alternately The Christian Union, and The First Universalist Society of Englewood)
- 1892-1936 - Rev. Rufus Austin White (at The People's Liberal Church of Chicago)
- 1939-1944 - Donald S. Harrington (at The People's Liberal Church of Chicago, and 1942–1944 at Beverly Unitarian Fellowship as well)
- Robert S. Hoagland
- Willim D. Hammond
- Hartley C. Ray

=== Beverly Unitarian Society prior to merger ===
- 1941-1942 - Lon Ray Call
- 1942-1944 - Donald S. Harrington
- 1944-1946 - Jack Mendelsohn
- 1947-1950 - William Hammond
- 1946-19xx - Helgi I. S. Borgford

=== After merger ===
- 1950-1953 - Hartley Cabot Ray
- 1954-1963 Vincent Silliman
- 1964-1970 S. Hunter Leggitt, Jr.
- 1970-1971 John Lester Young (interim)
- 1971-1979 Robert L. Schaibly
- 1980-1991 Roger Brewin
- 1992-1993 Thomas Payne (interim)
- 1994-2003 Leonette Bugleisi
- 2003-2005 Jim Hobart (interim)
- 2005-2008 Karen Matteson
- 2008-2009 Ana Levy-Lyons
- 2009-2014 Neil Shadle
- 20XX-2014 Nan Hobart
- 2014-2016 Karen Mooney
- 2016-2017 John Smith
- 2017–2021 David Schwartz
