= Illinois Woman's Press Association =

American professional organization

The Illinois Woman's Press Association (IWPA) is an Illinois-based organization of professional women and men pursuing careers across the communications spectrum. It was founded in 1885 by a group of 47 women who saw a need for communication and support between women writers. The organization was incorporated on June 26, 1907.

== Early years ==
During May 1885, Marion A. McBride of the Boston Post, press commissioner for the World Cotton Centennial in New Orleans, shared her dream of a national association of women journalists with others at the exposition. With the country fragmented from the American Civil War and a bleak economy that offered few opportunities for women journalists, benefits were nonexistent and working conditions dire. After hearing McBride's message, Chicago press correspondent Frances A. Conant returned to Illinois and agreed to recruit other women writers for a local group. After meeting with Chicago Evening Post writer Antoinette Van Hoesen Wakeman, author and publisher Alice Bunker Stockham, M.D., and others, Conant organized an auxiliary in Chicago. The group met at the law office of Myra Bradwell, the founder and editor of Legal News and a publisher of law books.

Many of the original group went on to become notable in their fields with founder and member Frances Willard possibly the best known as an author, publisher, editor and writer and president of the Women's Christian Temperance Union. Many initial members belonged to the union. Myra Bradwell became the first woman to be admitted to the Illinois bar. These women were authors, writers of creative fiction, factual reporters, magazine publishers, editors, publisher of the most important weekly legal publication in the Midwest, playwrights, novelists, medical research correspondents, short story writers, cookbook publishers, and children's book authors. Six female physicians would be counted among the founders. Mary Crowell Van Benschoten, author, newspaper publisher, and clubwoman, was a charter member.

IWPA was firmly rooted in the women's club movement at the turn of the twentieth century. The association was linked with other professional and women's groups including the National Editorial Association (NEA) and International League of Press Clubs. It was an auxiliary to the Illinois Woman's Alliance which included twenty-four local communities, religious and professional organizations whose goal it was to establish a labor union for working women and children.

== Initial structure ==
The organizers of the Association designed it on a broad, liberal foundation with its Constitution drawn to admit writers of all classes: authors, contributors, correspondents and poets as well as journalists. Membership voted to include publishers and illustrators. Under the Illinois Woman's Press Association Constitution a slate of officers included a president, a single vice president, recording and corresponding secretaries, a treasurer, and two assistants. By 1890, the slate was expanded to include three vice presidents and two librarians. The executive committee consisted of general officers along with the chairwomen of standing committees: Membership, Literary Information and Program. It was also divided into divisions reflective of the issues of the era and work being done my members: Editors, Reporters, Authors, Correspondents and Contributors, and Publishers. The number of years an officer served was not mentioned in the bylaws of the early years.

== Presidents ==
There have been 49 women sworn into office, and 52 presidencies with Elizabeth Armstrong Reed and Eunice W. Thompson both serving two non-consecutive terms. Reed is chronologically counted as the third and seventh president; Thompson as the 25th and 30th.

Those elected to lead IWPA throughout its history have been women with remarkable careers for the times. Among them: Mary Allen West, elected the first president of IWPA serving from January, 1886 until January, 1893. Born in Galesburg, IL, West had been elected the county superintendent of schools in the state of Illinois in 1873 serving for nine years before moving to Chicago. She was also the editor of the Women's Christian Temperance Union's ''Union Signal'',

Elizabeth Armstrong Reed was president of IWPA from January, 1894, to June, 1896, and again for the 1902–1904 term. Widely known as a book author and Oriental scholar, Reed was a member of the International Society of Orientalists, and chairwoman of the Woman's Congress of Philology.

Mate E. Palmer, president from June, 1907 until June, 1909, was the editor of the Banner of Gold and for whom the professional Mate E. Palmer Communications Contest would be named.

Leona Alford Malek, a pioneer writer, lecturer and widely known food and home economist, served six years as IWPA president from June, 1929 until June, 1935. She was the editor of Home Economics for the Herald-Examiner and was known as "Prudence Penny" to thousands of American women. Her articles were published in the Ladies' Home Journal, Modern National Women's Magazine, Popular Monthly, People's Home Journal, Modern Priscilla and others. She orchestrated the home economics sections in 500 newspapers throughout the United States, using various pen names including "Theo Ayers" for different publications. She was the director of food economics for Armour & Co. and lectured for the National Canners Association and the National Grocers Association. Malek had also been the defense chairwoman for the Daughters of the American Revolution.

=== Presidents (by term dates) ===
1. Mary Allen West, 1886 (January) - 1893 (January)
2. Helen Ekin Starrett, 1893 (January) - 1894 (January)
3. Elizabeth Armstrong Reed, 1894 (January) - 1896 (June)
4. Sallie M. Moses, 1896 (June) - 1898 (June)
5. H. Effa Webster, 1898 (June) - 1900 (June)
6. Amelia Sheckelford Sullivan, 1900 (June) - 1902 (June)
7. Elizabeth Armstrong Reed, 1902 (June) - 1904 (June)
8. Ada Barton Bogg, 1904 (June) - 1907 (June)
9. Mate E. Palmer, 1907 (June) - 1909 (June)
10. Cornelia Templeton Jewett (Hatcher), 1909 (June) - 1910 (June)
11. Mary Eleanor O'Donnell, 1910 (June) - 1913 (June)
12. Ethel M. Colson Brazelton, 1913 (June) - 1917 (June)
13. Mary Delaney Holden, 1917 (June) - 1919 (June)
14. Maude Swalm Evans, 1919 (June) - 1923 (June)
15. Clara Ingram Judson, 1923 (June) - 1925 (June)
16. Mary Dickerson Donahey, 1925 (June) - 1927 (June)
17. Anne Myers Sergel, 1927 (June) - 1927 (December)
18. Josephine Bessoms, 1927 (December) - 1929 (June)
19. Leona Alford Malek, 1929 (June) - 1935 (June)
20. Helen Miller Malloch, 1935 (June) - 1941 (June)
21. Bernadine Bailey, 1941 (June) - 1945 (June)
22. Helen Stevens Fisher, 1945 (June) - 1949 (June)
23. Ruth Rawlings McGlone, 1949 (June) - 1951 (June)
24. Minnie Johnson Schachner, 1951 (June) - 1953 (June)
25. Eunice W. Thompson, 1953 (June) - 1957 (June)
26. Pearl Dieck Serbus, 1957 (June) - 1960 (June)
27. Kathryn Winslow Mecham, 1960 (June) - 1963 (June)
28. Michelle Graf, 1963 (June) - 1963 (July)
29. Virginia Novinger, 1963 (July) - 1964 (June)
30. Eunice W. Thompson, 1964 (June) - 1965 (June)
31. Sallie Whelan, 1965 (June) - 1967 (June)
32. Laura Jackson, 1967 (June) - 1971 (June)
33. Millie Vickery, 1971 (June) - 1973 (June)
34. Lucille Hecht, 1973 (June) - 1975 (June)
35. Gladys Erickson, 1975 (June) - 1977 (June)
36. Victoria Wilson, 1977 (June) - 1979 (June)
37. Margaret Bengtson, 1979 (June) - 1981 (June)
38. Olga Gize Carlile, 1981 (June) - 1983 (June)
39. Frances Altman, 1983 (June) - 1985 (June)
40. Marlene Cook, 1985 (June) - 1989 (June)
41. Phyllis Rohr, 1989 (June) - 1991 (June)
42. Karen Biesboer, 1991 (June) - 1993 (June)
43. Cecilia Green, 1993 (June) - 1996 (June)
44. Peggy Grillet, 1996 (June) - 2001 (June)
45. Marion E. Gold, 2001 (June) - 2003 (June)
46. Val Ensalaco, 2003 (June) - 2005 (June)
47. Suzanne Hanney, 2005 (June) - 2009 (June)
48. Marianne Wolf-Astrauskas, 2009 (June) - 2013 (June)
49. Becky Sarwate, 2013 (June) - 2017 (June)
50. Cora Weisenberger, 2017 (June) - 2021 (June)
51. Art Brauer, 2021 (June) - 2025 (June)
52. Janice Renee Newman, 2025 (June) - Present

== Notable members ==
Fanny Butcher, longtime literary editor and critic for the Chicago Tribune began her career at the newspaper after first meeting Mary Eleanor O'Donnell, IWPAs 11th president, who was also the women's editor of the 'Tribune'. Impressed by Butcher's featured stories published in short-lived publications Morrison's Weekly and Chicago, O'Donnell offered Butcher the opportunity to write the column, "How to Earn Money at Home." From the success of that column Butcher's fifty-year career at the newspaper began and she would continue to write for each of the newspaper departments. She is credited with suggesting the tabloid book review in the Sunday edition of the paper. Butcher focused on discussions with writers and reviewing bestseller books. Throughout her career, Butcher maintained lifelong friendships with many prominent authors and other literary figures. The Newberry Library in Chicago contains a special collection of Butcher's correspondence with those authors and other literary figures, including Ernest Hemingway, Willa Cather, H. L. Mencken, Sinclair Lewis and Carl Sandburg who referred to her as "Miss Chicago, Lady Midwest." Likewise, the collection contains many publicity portraits of authors and other literary figures sent to Fanny for use in her columns and reviews. She acquired a reputation as the dean of Chicago's Literary critics and would be the first woman honored by the Friends of the Chicago Public Library. At the age of 93, she was inducted into the Hall of Fame of the Chicago Press Club. Carrie Ashton Johnson, who wrote about the suffrage and temperance movements of the day, was a member for five decades. Jennie Murray Kemp was the editor and publisher of Our Messenger, 1889–1903; circulation manager of The Union Signal, and The Young Crusader, 1903–12; and National Woman's Christian Temperance Union press superintendent. In addition to being a poet and hymnwriter, Julia H. Thayer served as president of the Chicago Female College.

== Publications ==
The earliest publication produced by the organization was The Stylus, A Journal for Writers, from 1905 - 1908, with Carolyn Alding Huling as editor. A quarterly publication, PenPoints appeared in February 1920, which continues to this day. In 1914, the Illinois Woman's Press Association published a hardbound anthology entitled The Memory Book. It is a collection of stories, poems, essays, commentary and illustrations that reflected the era and lives of 97 of its members. It was published by Ralph Fletcher Seymour, an American artist, author, and publisher based in Chicago. In 1932, the organization published the Prominent Women of Illinois 1885-1932. The profit from the sale of this book raised money during the Great Depression "to be used as a permanent loan fund for the benefit of needy women."

== Federation ==
IWPA is believed to be the oldest organization of women writers and is the founding mother of the National Federation of Press Women. In 1935, with Helen Miller Malloch as its 20th president, IWPA was interested in getting copyright legislation through Congress that would protect women writers whose creative work was being used on radio broadcasts without monetary compensation. She saw it as one of many advantages that unification could offer its membership. The IWPA members endorsed the federation idea at its members meeting on March 20, 1936. In May, 1937, through Helen's efforts, 39 women from seven states gathered at the Chicago Women's Club to form the National Federation of Press Women and set forth their goals: "To provide a means of communication between woman writers nationally; make possible the expression of a common voice in matters of national interest to press women, and otherwise advance the professional standards of press women." In uniting affiliates across the country, Miller Malloch and her board pressed to improve working conditions for all women writers, safeguard the First Amendment and protect the United States Constitution.

Miller Malloch served as president of NFPW and IWPA simultaneously in 1937. She asked to be relieved of the NFPW presidency at the 1938 convention and continued as IWPA president until 1941. She continued to serve NFPW as corresponding secretary, regional vice president, and first vice president and at the May 1942, conference in Topeka, Kan. was again elected president for the 1942–43 term.

== Competitions ==
Today, IWPA represents an assemblage of diverse communicators, both men and women. It continues to encourage communicators, who through their efforts enrich programs and activities each year including professional recognition by the Mate E. Palmer communications contest for members and the Illinois high school communications contest. The annual competition honors communications in a wide range of categories both in print and electronic media, books, photography, advertising as well as public relations. First place winning entries of the contest go on to compete for national recognition in the National Federation of Press Women's Professional Communications Contest.

The Mate E. Palmer Awards were established in 1941 to publicize the media work of its statewide members. Rules governing the contest have expanded since its inception along with the categories. The rules and regulations parallel those set by the National Federation of Press Women and are published yearly. Named after IWPA's ninth president, Mrs. Mary E. (Mate) Palmer, she was considered a Life Member having joined the organization in 1895. At the time of her death in 1939, Palmer left a bequest of $500 to Sadie Quayle, who had cared for her during her last days. Quayle turned the bequest over to IWPA to establish a writing contest in Palmer's memory. The Silver Feather Award was established in 1972 by the Mate E. Palmer Award Contest committee to stimulate incentive in the awards program. The first winner was Dolores Haugh. The Silver Feather (Writer of the Year) is the result of contest entrants accumulating the most points earned in the state competition.

The Editorial Writing Contest for High School Girls was first mentioned in the Sept. 1972 edition of PenPoints. By 1976, boys were included in the contest for the first time renaming it the High School Contest to connect with journalism students and their educators at the high school level. Today, the competition honoring excellence in student work is known as the High School Communications Contest. First place winning entries compete in the National Federation of Press Women's High School Communications Contest where they earn nationwide recognition. The national contest is endorsed by the National Association of Secondary School Principals.

== First male member ==
Though the founders would use the word woman is in its title, there was never a policy excluding men from membership. The first male member, Dr. Eugene Vickery, a poet, medical writer, and book author joined IWPA one hundred years later in 1985. The IWPA "Communicator of the Year" award was presented to a male member for the first time in 1989 earning Dr. Vickery another first in the organization.

== Anniversary milestones ==
IWPA celebrated its 125th year by hosting the National Federation of Press Women 2010 Conference at the Union League Club of Chicago. The Opening Reception was sponsored by the Chicago Office of Tourism and the Illinois Woman's Press Association on Thursday evening, August 26, 2010 at Maxim's: The Nancy Goldberg International Center, 24 East Goethe Street in Chicago.

In 2012, IWPA participated in co-sponsorship of the 75th anniversary celebration of the National Federation of Press Women during the annual confab September 20–22, in Scottsdale, Ariz. [nfpw.org]
