= Julia H. Thayer =

American poet and educator (1847–1944)

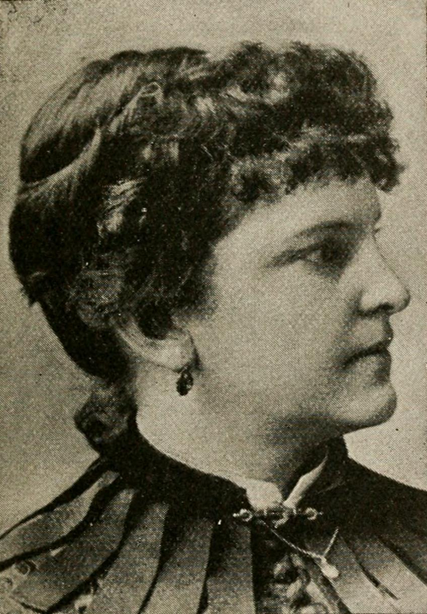
- Portrait photo from Local and national poets of America, 1892
- Born: October 6, 1847; Keeseville, New York, U.S.
- Died: January 14, 1944 (aged 96); Little Neck, New York, U.S.
- Occupations: poet; educator
- Known for: President, Chicago Female College

Signature
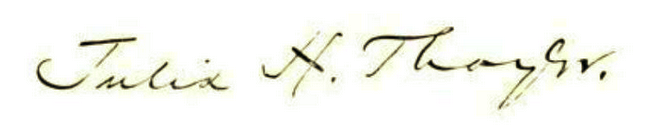

Julia H. Thayer (1847–1944) was an American poet and educator. She served as president of the Chicago Female College, located in the Givins Beverly Castle, at Morgan Park, Chicago, Illinois. Thayer's productions, chiefly poetical and religious, appeared in various papers and magazines. She also wrote hymns, and was an authority on Ancient Greek literature.

== Early life and education ==
Julia H. Thayer was born on October 6, 1847, in Keeseville, New York, a village near Lake Champlain. Her parents were Gilbert and Adeline Maria (Foote) Thayer. Gilbert had been the instructor and principal of the Jacksonville Female Academy (now Illinois College). Julia's siblings were Emma, Henry, Frank, and Addie.

At the age of ten, the family moved to Illinois. She was educated at her father's school in Morgan Park, the Chicago Female College.

== Career ==
Thayer's brother was the first person to whom she confided that she wrote poetry. Reading some of her works to an unsuspecting grandmother, Thayer was horrified that the grandmother too often pronounced Thayer's writing as but "silly trash," and rarely ascribed the praise of "very good," or, "I like that sentiment."

She first published her verses anonymously, but since 1870, the productions, chiefly poetical, appeared in various papers and periodicals under her own name. She received flattering inducements to write prose but was most devoted to poetry. Her best works were religious poems and simple lyrics. She wore a plain gold ring on the third finger of her left hand, the first piece of precious metal she received for one of her poems. Thayer was not only a writer of lyrical poetry, but occasionally wrote prose, and was also a fine musician.

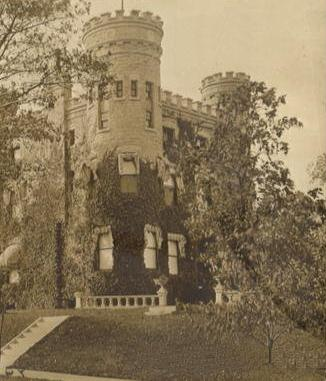
Chicago Female College was located in the Givens Castle (1890 photo)

After her father's death in 1892, Thayer became president of the nonsectarian Chicago Female College, in the Givens Castle, which she owned.

In Chicago, Thayer also directed the Studio of General Culture and Literature Training. She was a member of the Illinois Woman's Press Association and the National League of American Pen Women.

== Death ==
Julia H. Thayer died in Little Neck, New York, on January 14, 1944.

== Selected works ==
=== Hymns ===
- "His Greeting"
- "I Am Trusting in the Darkness"
- "I’ve Found Him"
- "Missing"
- "There Is a Star That Gilds the Gloom"
- "Thou Art Mine"
