= Myrtle Elvyn =

American pianist and composer (c. 1887–1975)

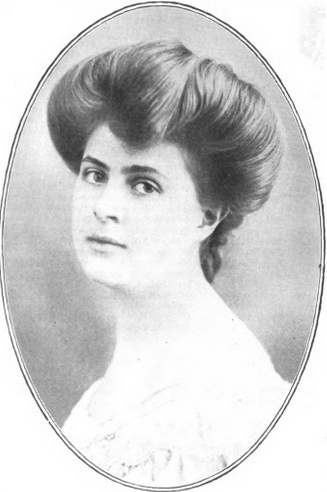
Myrtle Elvyn, from a 1908 publication.

Myrtle Elvyn (born circa 1887 – died February 1975), later Myrtle Elvyn-Bloch, was an American pianist and composer.

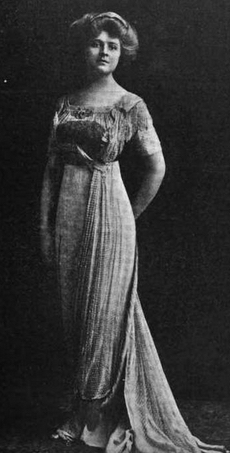
Myrtle Elvyn, from a 1914 publication.

== Early life ==
Myrtle Elvyn was born in Sherman, Texas and raised in Chicago, Illinois, the daughter of Edward Elvyn and Fannie M. Goldsmith Elvyn. Her parents were from Arkansas and Kentucky. Theatrical manager Sid Grauman was her first cousin; their mothers were sisters. She studied music with Carl Wolfsohn in Chicago, and in Europe with Leopold Godowsky. She also studied composition with Hugo Kaun.

== Career ==
Elvyn made her debut as a pianist in Berlin in 1904, and played in Germany, Austria, Holland, Belgium, and Great Britain from 1905 to 1907. She was described as one of the three great American women pianists in 1908, along with Fannie Bloomfield Zeisler and Julie Rivé-King. "Myrtle Elvyn is wholly unexcelled in power, brilliance and endurance in the playing of strictly 'show pieces'", declared one music writer in 1914.

Elvyn toured nationally in the United States from 1909 to 1914. She performed Liszt's Piano Concerto No. 2 in A major with the New York Philharmonic on November 21, 1909. She lived in Chicago and concentrated her performing schedule especially in the American midwest. She played with the symphony orchestras of Minneapolis, St. Paul, Detroit, and Cincinnati, and toured with the St. Louis Symphony Orchestra. She gave the closing performance at the Iowa State Music Teachers' Convention in 1914.

Despite her announced retirement in 1917, returned briefly to the stage in 1918 and 1919, after marriage and motherhood, as Myrtle Elvyn-Bloch. In 1918 she gave a recital to benefit the Mother's Aid organization of the Chicago Lying-in Hospital. She gave another benefit performance for Mother's Aid in 1921.

Compositions by Elvyn included "Serenade" (1911) and "Novelette" (1911).

== Personal life ==
Myrtle Elvyn married Harry L. Bloch (1882–1967) in February 1917, in a ceremony performed by Chicago rabbi Gerson B. Levi. They had sons Harry (1917–1973) and Edward. She was widowed when Harry L. Bloch died in Switzerland in 1967. She died in February 1975, aged about 88 years.
