= Helen Ekin Starrett =

American educator (1840–1920)

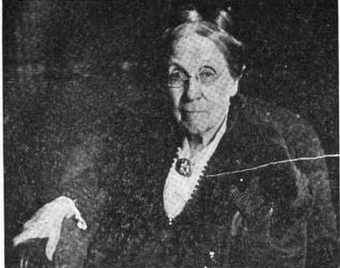
- Born: Helen Martha Ekin; September 19, 1840; Pittsburgh, Pennsylvania, U.S.
- Died: December 16, 1920 (aged 80); Portland, Oregon, U.S.
- Resting place: Mountain View Cemetery, Oakland, California, U.S.
- Occupations: educator; author; suffragist; magazine founder; school founder
- Spouse: William A. Starrett (m. 1864)
- Children: 7

Helen Ekin Starrett (née, Ekin; September 19, 1840 – December 16, 1920) was an American educator, author, suffragist, and magazine founder. Long engaged in educational work in Chicago, she founded the Kenwood Institute (1884), and Mrs. Starrett's Classical School for Girls (1893), of which she was principal. Starrett also founded Western Magazine (1880–83, Chicago). She served as president of the Illinois Woman's Press Association (1893–1894), and was the author of several works.

== Early life and education ==
Helen Martha Ekin was born in Pittsburgh, Pennsylvania, September 19, 1840. (Note: According to her 1920 obituary in The Oregon Daily Journal, Starrett was born September 9, 1840.) She was the daughter of Rev. John and Esther Fell (Lee) Ekin.

She was educated at Pittsburg High School.

== Career ==
=== Educator ===
Starrett was the founder of Kenwood Institute, Chicago.

Starrett's chief public work was done as principal of the Starrett School for Girls. Upon being widowed, she went to Chicago and there opened a school for girls, at first a very small institution, but it enabled her to keep her family of seven children together, which pleased her. The school grew in usefulness, size and importance, until at the end of 30 years' service as its head, Starrett retired from its active principalship at the age of 75, at which time the title of principal emeritus was conferred upon her. Starrett School for Girls was a co-operative with the University of Chicago. It occupied a colonial home, surrounded by 2 acres (0.81 ha) of lawn. Ten resident pupils were received in the family of the principal. Day pupils were limited in number to 100. Its certificate admitted to Vassar College, Wellesley College, Smith College, as well as to the University of Chicago.

=== Activist, suffragist ===
In 1915, she was appointed one of the 100 electors who each five years decided on additions to the list of eminent Americans who would be included in the Hall of Fame established in 1900 by New York University. Starrett and Ida Tarbell were the only women who were added to the list of electors at that time. A delegate to the first U.S. woman suffrage convention (1870) and the last (1920), Starrett was the only surviving member of the pioneer suffragists who first focused public opinion by means of a general convention on the campaign for women's votes.

=== Writer ===
The Future of Educated Women (1885)

Letters to a Daughter (1886)

After College, What? (1896)

Starrett was a contributor to magazines, such as The Continent a Presbyterian publication from McCormick Publishing Company, as well as educational and religious journals. She was the author of Future of Educated Women, 1880: Letters to a Daughter, 1882; Letters to Elder Daughters, 1883; Gyppie, an Obituary, 1884; Pete, the Story of a Chicken, 1885; Letters to a Little Girl, 1886; andCrocus and Wintergreen, poems (with her sister, Frances Ekin Allison).

Published by Jansen, McClurg & Co., Chicago, The Future Of Educated Women, by Helen Ekin Starrett; and Men, Women And Money, by Frances Ekin Allison, were bound together in one book. The former and larger essay was the more mature of the two, and, although not altogether free from haste and opinionatedness, it had the merit of a point of view. The author discussee the matter of self-support and independence, and that however urgent such may be, they are reduced to insignificance by the necessity of women finding a means of expression for the spiritual growth that takes place in them. She also spoke about labor, like virtue, may be its own reward; and from professional and other means of expressing the fullness of human nature, certainly no one should be debarred. The second essay, by Frances Ekin Allison, is thought out on a lower key, and referenced the independence that a woman feels when she has a source of income in her own right.

== Personal life ==
On February 15, 1864, she married Rev. William A. Starrett.

She died December 16, 1920, in Portland, Oregon.

== Selected works ==
- After college, what? For girls
- Letters to Elder Daughters
- The future of educated women, 1885
- Letters to a daughter : and a little sermon to school-girls, 1886
- The housekeeping of the future, 1890 (with Julia Ward Howe)
- Gyppy. An obituary, 1890
- Letters to a little girl, 1892
- A pioneer poet, 1894 (with Benjamin Hathaway)
- Crocus and wintergreen, 1907
- Bereavement and consolation : a little book of poems for Memorial Days, 1919
- Cottage Grove Avenue, Chicago : a study of life on one of the typically ugly streets in the typically "ugly city.", 1920
- The Charm of Fine Manners: Being a Series of Letters to a Daughter, 1920
- The Charm of a Well Mannered Home. (Originally published under the title "Letters to Elder Daughters.")., 1923
