= Dorothy Malone (writer) =

American writer

Dorothy Malone Mitchell (fl. 1920s to 1950s) was an American writer and columnist. Her books include How Mama Could Cook! (1946), Cookbook for Brides (1947) and Cookbook for Beginners (1953). Malone wrote a daily column under the pen name Prudence Penny (a pseudonym for a number of female Hearst columnists) for the New York American and later wrote as "Elsie Barton" for Secrets magazine.

== Career ==
According to a 1947 profile, Malone worked for William Randolph Hearst's company (now Hearst Communications) for 15 years. In 1947 she was living with her sister, Ruth Brown, and daughter Valerie at 22 Woodbine Avenue in Larchmont, New York; per the 1940 US census, she had been widowed.

As of 1947, she had a weekly radio program on a station called WOR (possibly either WEPN-FM or WOR).
