= Robert C. Givins =

Canadian-born real estate developer and author (1845–1915), in US from an early age

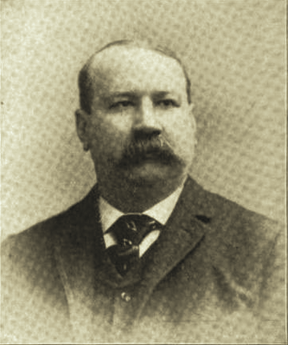
Portrait photo from The Story of Chicago, 1894

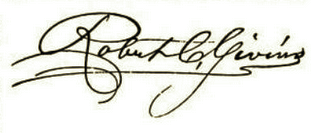
signature

Robert C. Givins (1845/46-1915) was a Canadian-born American real estate developer and novelist. He built the Givins Beverly Castle in Beverly, Chicago, Illinois.

== Early life and education ==
Robert C. Givins was born in Ontario, Canada in 1845 or 1846. (Note: According to Kirkland & Kirkland (1894), Givins was born near Kingston, Ontario, in 1846, while according to his obituary in the Chicago Tribune, Givins was born in Yorkville, Toronto, Ontario in 1845.) He was the third son of the Rev. Saltern Givins, who for many years was the rector of St. Paul's Episcopal Church, Toronto.

When seventeen years old, having completed his college course, Givins came to Chicago with a capital of ten cents. He soon secured a situation in the real estate office of C. J. Hull, a noted real estate dealer at that time, and from whom Givins learned his first lesson in subdividing property. He entered the Union College of Law (now, Northwestern University Pritzker School of Law) in 1865 and graduated from that institution in 1867.

== Career ==
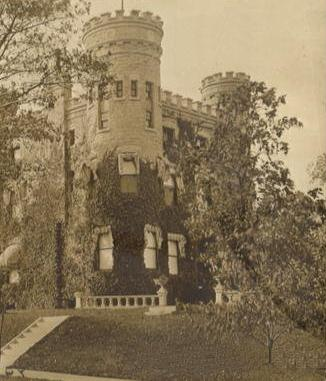
Givins Castle, 1890

He was admitted to practice in the Supreme Court of Illinois in 1868, but never took much interest in the profession, having turned his attention to real estate. He inaugurated the system of selling lots to the working people on small monthly payments. The first subdivision ever sold out entirely by this method is situated on the northwest corner of 12th street, and what is now called Central Park Avenue. The plat was placed on record by Givins & Gilbert in 1867. He early formed a partnership with James Gilbert, later sheriff of Cook County, and engaged in the real estate business under the name of Gilbert & Givins. In 1875, Givins became associated with Edmund A. Cummings and Silas M. Moore in the firm of E. A. Cummings & Co., and continued a member of that firm from that time.

He was the founder of many suburban towns about Chicago, several of which were later embraced within the Chicago city limits. During his business career, he sold out building lots sufficient to make a city of vast proportions.

He was fond of writing stories. Three of his novels, The Rich Man's Fool, The Millionaire Tramp, The Unwritten Will, were well known books of fiction, and were read throughout the U.S. and other countries. Other novels included Mlle. L'Inconneue, Jones Abroad and One thousand miles an hour. His letters, written to the Chicago Evening Post while on a trip around the world, proved highly entertaining.

Givins was one of the organizers and a charter member of the Chicago real estate board, of which organization he was vice president in 1894.

== Personal life ==
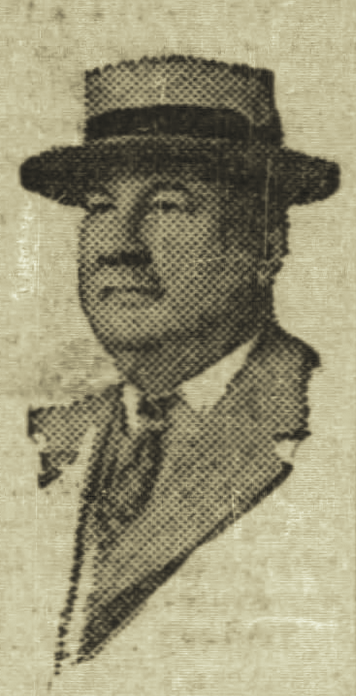
(1915)

In later years, he devoted much time to traveling, and was engaged with his wife, Emma S. Givins, in making a tour of the world and securing souvenirs and works of art from other countries for their home at Tracy Heights.

Their home, built of rock-faced limestone, on a high ridge, with commanding towers, was an imitation of a feudal castle, and a picturesque residence.

He had one son, Robert S. Givins.

Robert C. Givins died in San Francisco, California, April 14, 1915.

== Selected works ==
- The Rich Man's Fool
- The Millionaire Tramp
- The Unwritten Will
- Mlle. L'Inconneue
- Jones Abroad
- One thousand miles an hour
