= Givins Beverly Castle =

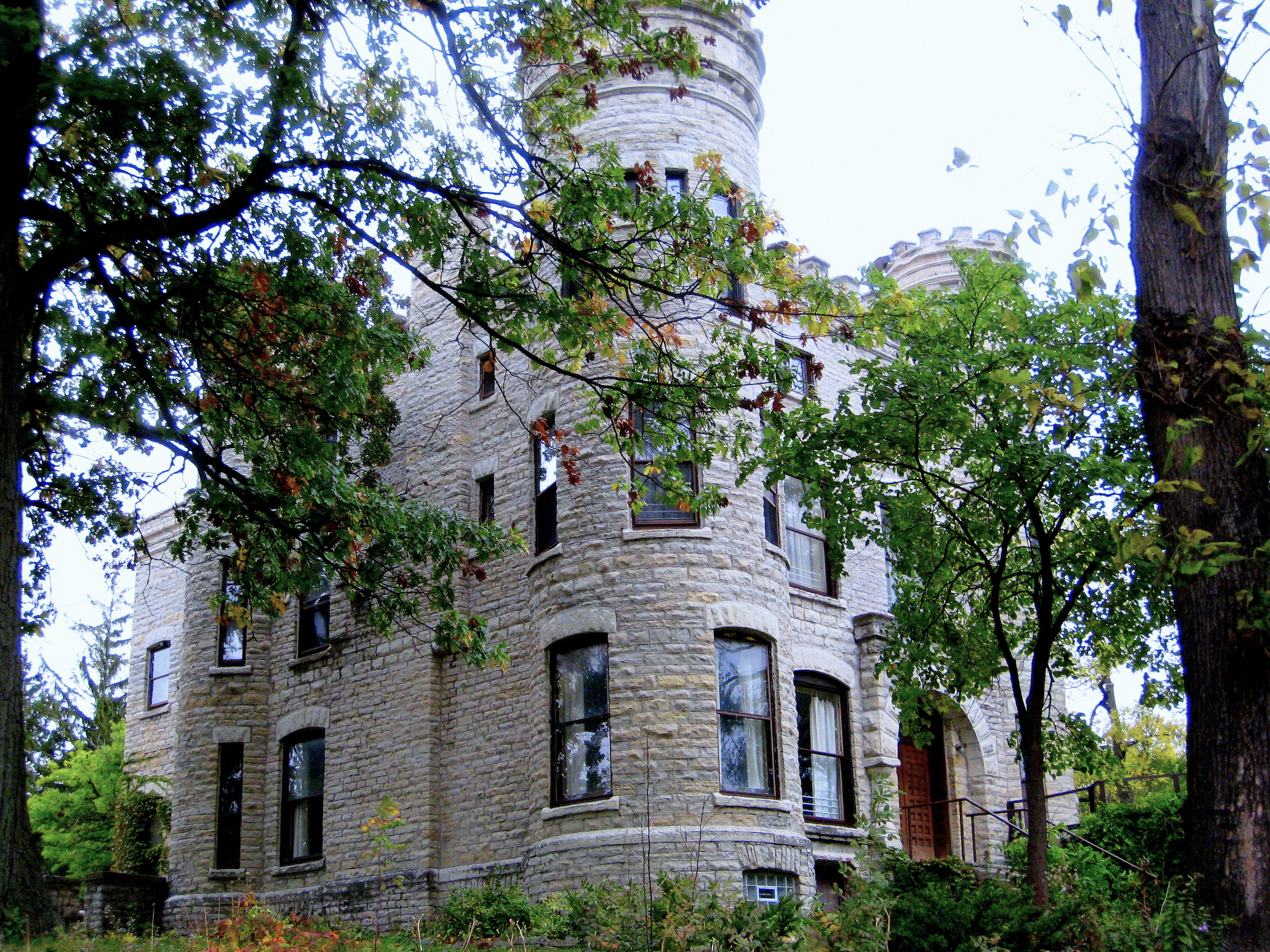
- Castle in 2007
- Interactive map of the Givins Beverly Castle area

General information
- Location: 10244 South Longwood Drive; Beverly, Chicago, Illinois
- Coordinates: 41.706812°N 87.671336°W
- Year built: 1886-87
- Groundbreaking: 1886
- Owner: Robert C. Givins (first); Chicago Female College (second); Beverly Unitarian Church (current)

The Givins Beverly Castle (also known as The Irish Castle or The Castle) is a 19th-century building located at the corner of West 103rd Street and Longwood Avenue on the far Southwest Side of Chicago, Illinois.

== History ==
The castle was built in the Beverly neighborhood of Chicago from 1886 to 1887 under the direction of Robert C. Givins. He was a successful real estate developer. It is a three-story structure with three crenelated towers. Givins lived in the castle from 1887 to 1894. From 1895 to 1897, the castle housed the Chicago Female College. Beverly Unitarian Church purchased the building for US$14,000 and has used it since 1942. It is the only building in the city described as a "castle."

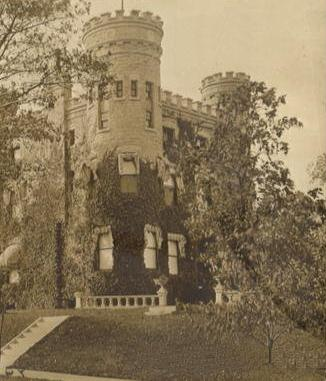
(1890)

It has been claimed to be haunted.

== Owners ==
The castle has had five owners:

- Givins family (1887–1909)
- Julia H. Thayer and the Chicago Female College (1895–1897)
- Burdett family (1909–1921)
- Dr. Miroslaw Siemens and family — Founder of the Ukrainian National Museum and surgeon at Roseland Community Hospital (1921–1942)
- Beverly Unitarian Church (1942–present)
