= Sid Grauman =

American showman and entrepreneur (1879–1950)

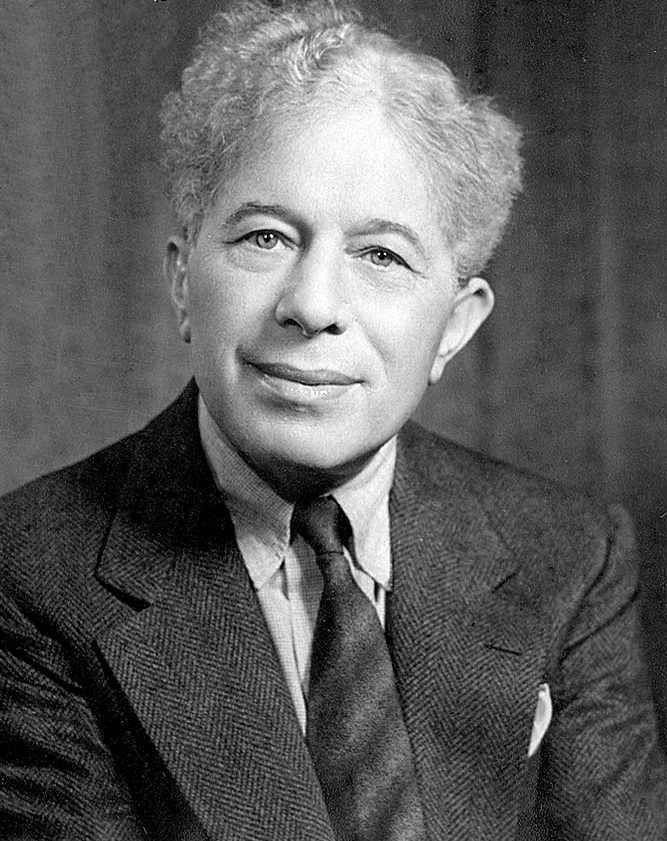
- Born: Sidney Patrick Grauman; March 17, 1879; Indianapolis, Indiana, U.S.
- Died: March 5, 1950 (aged 70); Los Angeles, California, U.S.
- Resting place: Forest Lawn Memorial Park Cemetery, Glendale, California, U.S.
- Occupations: Showman, entrepreneur

Sidney Patrick Grauman (March 17, 1879 – March 5, 1950) was an American entrepreneur and showman who established two of Hollywood's most recognizable and visited landmarks, the Chinese Theatre and the Egyptian Theatre.

== Biography ==
=== Early years ===
Grauman was born in Indianapolis, Indiana in 1879, the son of David Grauman (1851–1921) and Rosa Goldsmith (1853–1936). Grauman's parents were theatrical performers on show circuits. They were both Jewish.

Grauman and his father went to Dawson City, Yukon, for the Gold Rush when he was a young man. He worked there as a paperboy. Since newspapers were scarce, they could command a dollar each. Grauman told a story about a store owner who purchased a newspaper from him for $50. The shopkeeper then read the paper aloud in his store, charging admission to local miners. In the Yukon, the young Grauman learned a lesson which would serve him the rest of his life: that people would willingly pay handsomely for entertainment. Sid and his father began organizing events like boxing matches, which paid them well. It was also in the Yukon that Grauman saw his first motion picture. A failed prospector in the Klondike gold rush, David Grauman initially took his young son to the Klondike with the idea of building a theater there. Though they did not strike gold, both of the Graumans gained considerable wealth by their Klondike entertainment activities. When his father's sister became ill and he left the territory to care for her, young Grauman remained in Dawson City for a time. His parents settled in San Francisco and Grauman joined them there in 1900.

=== San Francisco ===
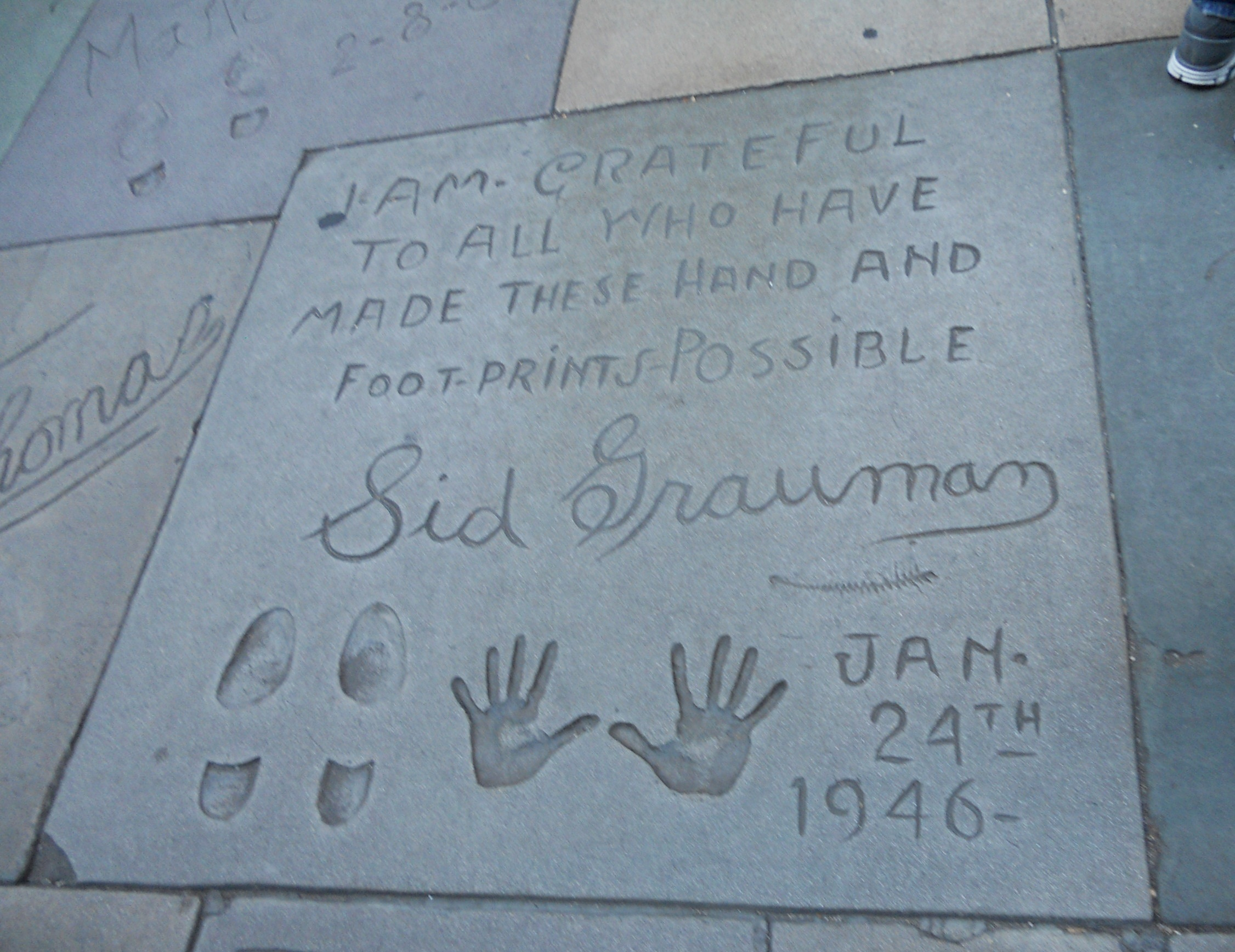
Sid Grauman's imprint

David and Sidney Grauman decided to open a vaudeville theater in San Francisco. Their first venture was on Market Street near Mason called the Unique Theater. Before long, they added motion pictures to the vaudeville shows, and another theater called the Lyceum. As the theater manager, though Sid Grauman had seen just about every type of performance, there were some that startled and amazed him, turning down an offer to learn how to swallow swords. The Graumans were also instrumental in establishing the Northwest Vaudeville Company, which stretched from San Francisco to Minneapolis and Portland, Oregon. The association brought quality live entertainment at reasonable prices to the Northwest area of the United States.

David Grauman tried his hand at expanding his theater business in New York City and the East Coast, where he was far from successful; for a time, Sid worked in Scranton, Pennsylvania, at one of the theaters in which he and his father were interested. David Grauman suffered enough financial loss to have the need to take a business partner in his Lyceum Theater, and to accept an offer from the partner to buy him out in 1905. He later arranged to take over the lease of the Lyceum, which would then evict his former partner from the theater in 1907. By early 1906, the Graumans had lost their lease of the Unique Theater. The building had been purchased by the president of the Orpheum Theater circuit and Grauman's rent was doubled by the new owner. The structure was able to house a theater only because Grauman had established one there before a fire ordinance prohibiting it was passed. Before his tenancy was over, Grauman hired a crew of men with axes to demolish the interior of the Unique, so it could not be re-built for use as a theater.

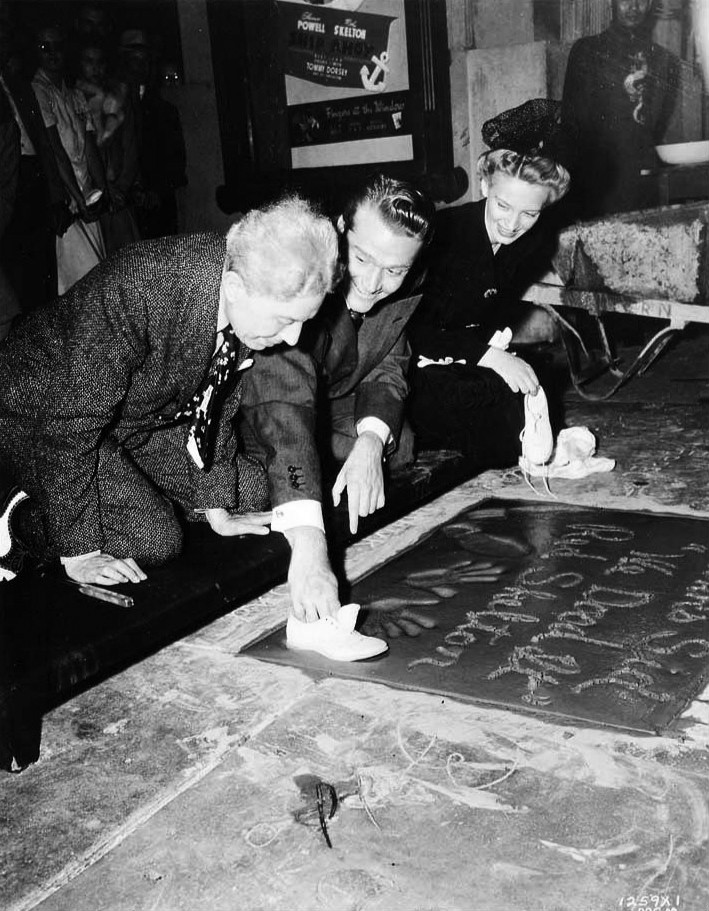
Sid Grauman with Red Skelton at Skelton's imprint ceremony in 1942

With the Unique Theater gone and the Lyceum unable to be occupied by the Graumans until 1907, father and son appeared to be temporarily out of business when the San Francisco earthquake of 1906 destroyed both the Unique and Lyceum theaters. Sid was able to save one of the theater's movie projectors from the ruins. He was also able to get a tent from an evangelist preacher in Oakland. Putting those together with some pews from a destroyed church, he set up on the site where the Unique once stood. The Graumans posted a sign outside of their makeshift theater that said: "Nothing to fall on you but canvas if there is another quake." The family received a commendation from the City of San Francisco for their help in boosting citizens' morale during the trying times. They operated their tent theater for two years; by that time David Grauman had opened a theater called the New National Theater. The Graumans expanded their theaters within a short period of time, opening the Imperial and the Empress in San Francisco, and branching out further to other Northern California cities. By 1917, the Graumans decided they would relocate to Los Angeles and build theaters there. They approached Adolph Zukor, who would go on to be the owner and founder of Paramount Pictures, regarding a business deal. Zukor agreed to buy the San Francisco theaters from the Graumans and also to assist them with financing in beginning their theater business in Los Angeles.

=== San Jose ===
Grauman introduced film shows to San Jose, California. On February 7, 1903, Sid Grauman opened the Unique Theatre at 20 East Santa Clara Street in San Jose. The theatre presented movies, stock theater companies, amateur nights, and vaudeville acts. The most notable amateur to develop his talent there was Roscoe "Fatty" Arbuckle. The 1906 earthquake demolished the Unique Theatre, and Grauman moved on to Los Angeles, founding the Princess Theatre and Grauman's Chinese Theatre in Hollywood.

=== Los Angeles ===
By 1918, the first of three Grauman movie palaces in downtown Los Angeles was open for business: the Million Dollar Theatre. The others, Grauman's Rialto and Grauman's Metropolitan Theater, opened in 1919 and 1923, respectively. In 1921 in Los Angeles, David Grauman died suddenly, never able to see the completion of the Egyptian Theatre which opened the year after his death. Now working on his own, Sid Grauman began building his last theater, the Chinese Theatre in 1926. It was opened for a premiere on May 18, 1927. There was a crush of onlookers eager to have a glimpse of both the stars attending and the splendor of the building. Many of the fittings were imported from China and Chinese artisans were brought in to create works of sculpture which were originally located in the theater's forecourt and are now housed inside the theater.

The forecourt still contains the celebrity hand and footprints in cement. The tradition began by accident, while the finishing touches were being put on the Chinese Theatre. Two versions of the story have been published; one has Mary Pickford as the actress who stepped in the wet cement on her way to see Sid Grauman's new building, and the other credits Norma Talmadge with the misstep. Grauman decided it was a wonderful way to have a permanent record of the stars, and began inviting selected film personalities to put their hand and footprints in concrete. Grauman himself made the choices; the tradition continued after his death using a secret system for choosing celebrities.

Grauman was not the sole owner of the Chinese Theatre, even though it bears his name. His business partners in the venture were Mary Pickford, Douglas Fairbanks and Howard Schenck. Two years after its opening, he sold his share of the theater to Fox West Coast Theatres, but remained its Managing Director for the rest of his life. Over four million people visit the Chinese Theatre yearly.

In addition to his theater, and Hollywood energies, Sid Grauman built the Hollywood Roller Bowl which led to the 'discovery' of Gloria Nord, who would become one of the most important people in roller skating's history.

Grauman's non-entertainment ventures turned out as badly as his father's. He formed the Black Hills Exploration Corporation in a gold mining effort near Deadwood, South Dakota. Grauman had convinced others such as entertainer Al Jolson and many movie company executives to join him in investing in the company. The company was not successful, and Grauman advised everyone to get out of the investment.

With Norma Shearer and Irving Thalberg (1932)

Grauman was well known to Hollywood's leading stars and was considered to be a close friend to many, including Roscoe "Fatty" Arbuckle. It was in Grauman's office at the Million Dollar Theatre that Arbuckle called the San Francisco police to turn himself in. Arbuckle began working for Grauman as a singer at his San Francisco Unique Theater as R. C. Arbuckle. The San Francisco theater connections of father and son meant the Graumans knew people like Charlie Chaplin and Mary Pickford, as the stars had performed at one of the Grauman theaters when they were on their way up. David Grauman was the originator of Pickford's "America's Sweetheart" nickname.

Grauman, who never married, was devoted to his mother. She was the only non-celebrity whose imprints were taken for display; after Rosa's death, Grauman kept all of her personal effects. Grauman was very closely connected with the motion picture industry and appeared in several cameo appearances that nodded to his fame in Hollywood and further afield in the Gold Rush. Living for 35 years at Los Angeles' Ambassador Hotel, Grauman spent the last six months of his life at Cedars-Sinai Medical Center, but not because of illness. Grauman liked being at Cedars and would leave to eat at various premier restaurants and return to the hospital to sleep.

== Death and legacy ==
Grauman received an honorary Academy Award in 1949 for raising the standard for film exhibition. He has a star on the Hollywood Walk of Fame at 6379 Hollywood Blvd. He was one of the original 36 founders of the Academy of Motion Picture Arts and Sciences (AMPAS).

Grauman died of a coronary occlusion at Cedars-Sinai Medical Center in Los Angeles on March 5, 1950, twelve days shy of his 71st birthday. He was interred in the Sanctuary of Benediction alcove in the Memorial Terrace section of the Great Mausoleum at Forest Lawn Memorial Park Cemetery in Glendale, California.

After Grauman's death, a woman named Carrie Adair came forward with claims of being his common-law wife and the mother of his child. Adair produced a copy of a will and a letter naming her as Grauman's childhood sweetheart. Adair's sister, Agnes Gerlich, gave testimony that her sister was living in Texas during the time she was said to be with Grauman. She also stated that the child Adair referred to was actually her daughter and not Adair's.

== See also ==
- Charles E. Toberman
- Myrtle Elvyn, a Chicago pianist, Sid Grauman's first cousin
