= Prudence Penny =

Pen name used by women home economics writers

Prudence Penny was a pen name used by women home economics writers and editors - and one man - in various Hearst newspapers in America, starting in the 1920s.

Under the pseudonym, the writer would write regular newspaper columns where she shared recipes (often emphasizing frugality), answered reader letters, gave advice for the home, and offered local cooking demonstrations. Some of them also hosted radio presentations, and wrote and edited cookbooks. Mabelle Burbridge, one of the first to write under the "Prudence Penny" byline, replied to 70,000 letters from readers in her first year.

"Prudence Penny" also starred as "Herself" in several films, most notably in Penny Wisdom which won an Academy Award in 1938 for best short subject.

"Come to Prudence with confidence! Your letter is not departmentalized, rubber stamped, or form-letter-answered. If you have never received a letter from Prudence Penny, you have a sweet experience before you!"

— Mabelle Burbridge, writing as Prudence Penny

Some of the women who used the "Prudence Penny" nom de plume were:

- Mary Baker (died 1932), radio speaker and columnist for the Omaha Bee-News
- Martha Bohlsen (1905-1984), start as Prudence Penny in 1936 Nebraskan home economics writer, radio, and TV pioneer
- Mabelle Burbridge, home economist writing for the New York Daily Mirror starting in the 1920's
- Claire Charles (died 1969), writer of nationally syndicated column "Household Hints"
- Aleene Gregory Houghton, teacher, educator, editor, and journalist
- Leona Alford Malek (1878-1953), home economist writing for the Chicago Herald and Examiner
- Dorothy Malone (born 1901), cookbook writer writing for the New York American
- Vaudine Newell, writing for 26 years as Prudence Penny for the New York Daily Mirror
- Bernice Orpha Redington (1891-1966), home economist writing for the Seattle Post-Intelligencer
- Norma Young, home economist and radio personality, writing for the Los Angeles Examiner

In June 1963, a male writer, Hyman Goldberg, began to write the weekly column for the Mirror under the byline after the death of Vaudine Newell, publishing recipes that often contrasted with the principles of prudence and frugality, and which Time Magazine called "intent on turning dinner into a binge".

According to Goldberg, at the time there were only three other "Prudence Penny" still published under the byline, although there had once been 30 of them.
