= Hugo Kaun =

German composer, conductor, and music teacher

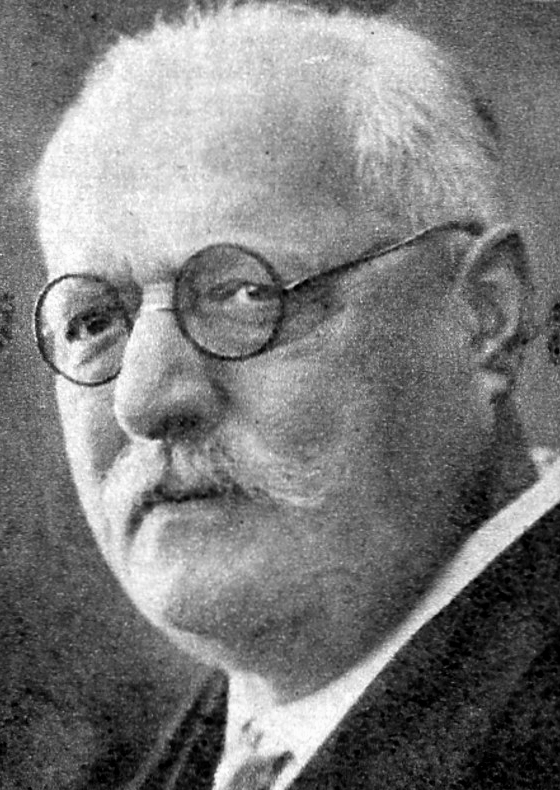

Hugo Wilhelm Ludwig Kaun (21 March 1863 – 2 April 1932) was a German composer, conductor, and music teacher.

== Biography ==
Kaun was born in Berlin, Kingdom of Prussia and completed his musical training in his native city. In 1886 (or 1887), he left Germany for the United States and settled in Milwaukee, Wisconsin, which was home to a well-established German immigrant community. As the conductor of local choral societies, such as the Milwaukee Liederkranz and the Milwaukee Men's Choir, Kaun quickly acquired an important influence in the city's musical life. He also taught at the conservatory, where his colleagues included Wilhelm Middelschulte. Kaun's eldest son, Bernhard Kaun, later became a composer of film scores in Hollywood.

At the turn of the century, Kaun returned to Germany and continued his teaching in Berlin. Although he received numerous lucrative offers of employment from abroad, these inducements could not persuade him to leave Berlin a second time. In 1912, he was appointed to the Prussian Academy of Arts. He chronicled his eventful life in his autobiography Aus meinem Leben (From My Life). He died in Berlin.

== Music ==
Kaun composed in a Romantic style for a wide range of genres, including operas, symphonies, tone poems, pieces for solo organ and piano, as well as works for other combinations of instruments. His opera Der Fremde was first performed at the Dresden Hofoper (now the Semperoper) on 23 February 1920, with a cast including Richard Tauber, Elisabeth Rethberg and Friedrich Plaschke, conducted by Fritz Reiner.

Notable students include composer Fannie Charles Dillon, pianist Myrtle Elvyn, and composer Charles J. Orth.

== Notable works ==
=== Operas ===
- Der Pietist ("The Pietist", or "Oliver Brown") (1885)
- Sappho, musical drama (1917)
- Der Fremde (The Stranger, 1920)
- Menandra (1927)

=== Orchestral ===
- Symphonies:
  - Symphony No. 1 in D minor, "To My Fatherland", Op. 22 (1898)
  - Symphony No. 2 in C minor, Op. 85 (1908)
  - Symphony No. 3 in E minor, Op. 96 (1913)
- Vineta, symphonic poem, Op. 8 (1886)
- Ein Karnavalsfest, Symphonic Suite in four movements, Op. 21 (1886)
- Maria Magdalena, Symphonic overture, Op. 33 (1897)
- Festive March on the American National Anthem, Op. 29 (1898)
- Sir John Falstaff, symphonic poem, Op. 60 (1904)
- Sechs Original-Kompositionen for Small Orchestra, Op. 70 (1906)
- Three Pieces for Small Orchestra, Op, 76 (1907)
- Am Rhein, Overture, Op. 90 (1912)
- Märkische Suite for orchestra, Op. 92 (1914)
- Festival March for large orchestra, Op. 99 (1915)
- Military March, Op. 101 (1915)
- Hanne Nüte, Ouvertüre, Op. 107 (1918)
- Menandra, Orchestral Suite (1929)
- Juventuti et Patriae, Academic Overture, Op. 126 (1930)

=== Concertos ===
- Piano Concerto in B minor, WoO, withdrawn (1898)
- Piano Concerto No. 1 in E flat minor, Op. 50 (1901)
- Fantasiestück for violin and orchestra, op. 66 (1905)
- Piano Concerto No. 2 in C minor, Op. 115 (1921)

=== Chamber music ===
- Octet (for Clarinet, Horn, Bassoon, 2 Violins, Cello and Double Bass) in F Major, Op. 26
- String Quintet in F-Sharp Minor, Op. 28
- Piano Quintet in F Minor, Op. 39 (1901)
- Piano Trio in B Major, Op. 32 (1895)
- Piano Trio in C Minor, op. 58 (1903)
- String Quartet No. 1 in F Major, At the Death of a Hero, Op. 40 (1897)
- String Quartet No. 2 in D Minor, Op. 41 (1899)
- String Quartet No. 3 in C Minor, Op. 74 (1906)
- String Quartet No. 4 in A Minor, Op. 114 (1920)
- Piano Quintet in F minor, Op. 39
- Piano Trio No. 2, Op. 58
- Humoresques for piano, Op. 79
- Choralvorspiele for organ, Op. 89
