= Leona Alford Malek =

American home economist (1878–1951)

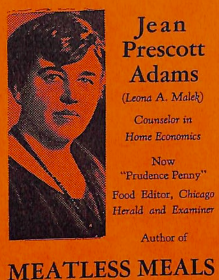
- Born: 1878; Chicago, Illinois
- Died: March 20, 1951 (aged 72–73); Chicago, Illinois
- Other names: Jean Prescott Adams, "Prudence Penny"
- Occupations: Home economist, editor, writer

Leona Alford Malek (1878 – March 20, 1951) was a home economist, editor, writer, and radio personality who used various pen names such as Jean Prescott Adams, and was one of several women who published and presented under the name of Prudence Penny.

== Early life ==
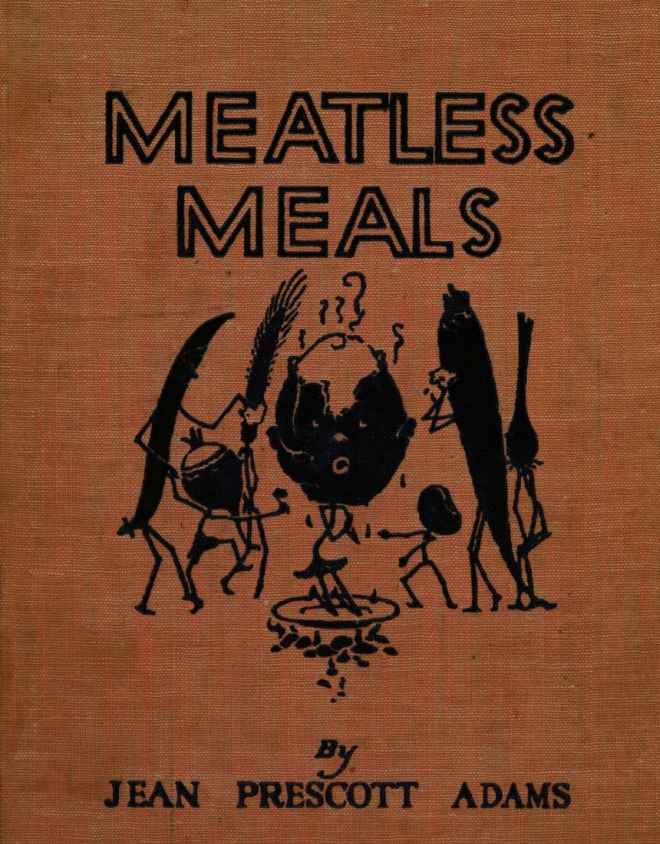
Malek's Meatless Meals, 1931

Born in 1878 in Chicago, Illinois, Malek was an alumnus of Chicago Teachers College. In 1905, she founded a cultural school and directed it until 1916. During this time she also did freelance writing for Ladies' Home Journal, National Women's Magazine, Southern Women's Magazine, while authoring articles on home economics for over 500 newspapers using various pseudonyms.

== Career ==
In 1915, Malik joined Armour & Company, a Chicago meat-packing firm, to head its nascent food economics department, while also writing and lecturing for the National Grocers Association and the National Canners Association, under the name "Jean Prescott Adams". She became known nationwide in 1917 as the editor of Armour's pamphlet, The Business of Being a Housewife: A Manual to Promote Household Efficiency and Economy.

In 1925, Malek began working for the Chicago Herald and Examiner as its home economics editor until 1939, writing a daily "Prudence Penny" column. She also wrote a column on home decorating as "Jean Prescott Adams". The New York Times called her a "noted home authority" and a "widely known home economist". She authored a vegetarian cookbook in 1931, Meatless Meals.

Malek was also the president of the Illinois Woman's Press Association from 1929 to 1935, during which she raised awareness for women of opportunities in radio journalism. In 1931, she was herself presenting a regular "Prudence Penny" radio broadcast. She had also been president of the Illinois Women's Athletic Club and the Modern Housekeeping Association.

== Death ==
Malek died at age 73, in her Chicago home on March 20, 1951, after a long illness, survived by her husband Alois Malek. At the time of her death, she was serving as the defense chairman for the regional chapter of the Daughters of the American Revolution.

== Selected publications ==
- The Business of Being a Housewife: A Manual to Promote Household Efficiency and Economy. Armour & Company. 1917.
- Meatless Meals. Laidlaw Brothers. 1931.
- Prudence Penny's Cookbook. Prentice-Hall. 1939.
