= Charles J. Orth =

19th and 20th century American composer

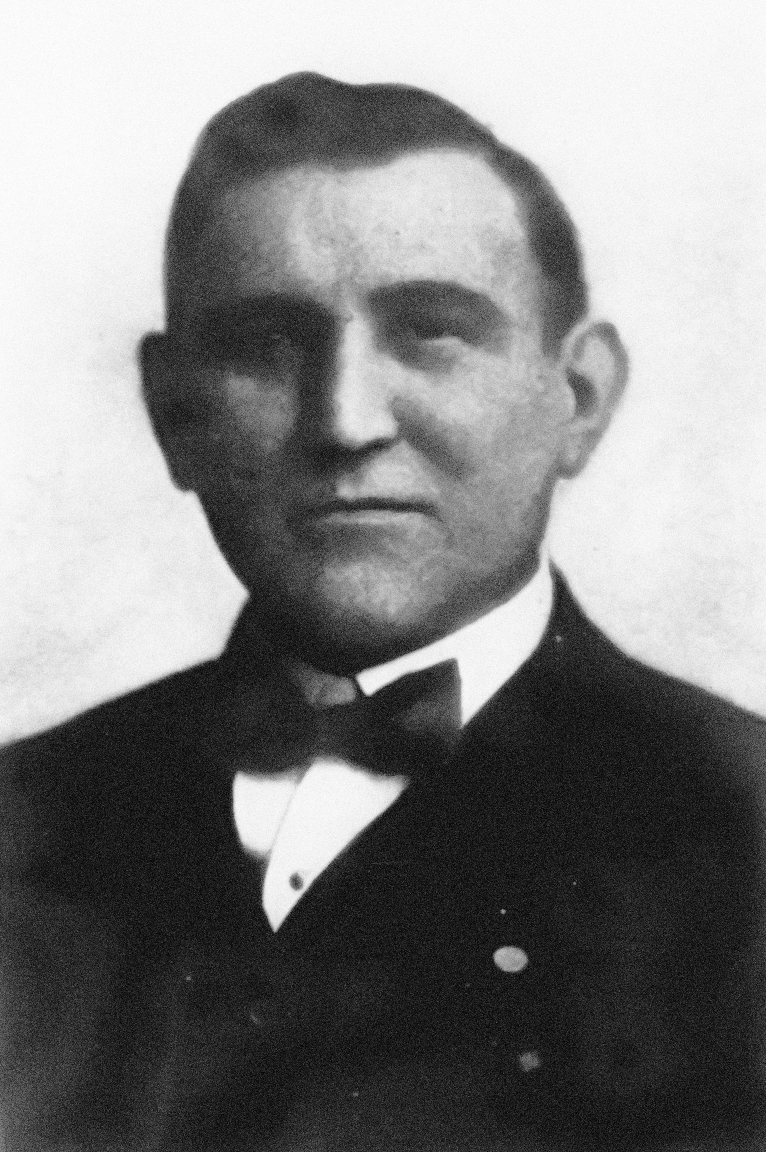
Orth c. 1919

Charles Joseph Orth (April 11, 1867 – February 1, 1921) was an American pianist, composer, and businessman known primarily for American march music and the novelty descriptive piece "In a Clock Store", which featured in popular music repertoire of the early 20th century.

== Biography ==
Orth was born on April 11, 1867, and raised in Milwaukee, Wisconsin, where he showed interest in music as a child, but his father planned for him to take over the family business instead. Due to his father's disapproval, he studied music in secret with the help of his mother. He became a student of Christopher Bach, Otto von Gumpert, William Dohrbeck, Hugo Kaun and Franz Neumann.

His father eventually found out, and was impressed by his son's musicianship, allowing him to continue his music studies as long as he balanced it out with his business education. He began to play piano in public throughout the city and the state. Orth eventually completed his study of business and joined his family's business according to the wishes of his father, but the business failed. Wanting to now pursue a career as a musician, his father still refused to allow it. They came to a compromise, with Orth working for a music dealer while also maintaining his musicianship.

Orth went on to write "In a Clock Store" at the age of 16, which was played by the Sousa Band beginning around 1893, with notable performances at the Chicago World's Fair. The song was also performed internationally and recorded many times.

He later became a music publisher, which brought him nationwide success. The hard work got the best of him, however, and forced him to step back and find something more low key for his own health. He became a music teacher and owner of a popular music store instead. Orth also conducted the Milwaukee Glee Club. He composed and published at least 22 songs during his lifetime, including medleys, marches, and waltzes, with notable performances of "Spanish Beggar Girl", "The Capture of Santiago", "Love's Melody", and "On the Battlefield of Life", among others. However, Orth was only well known for two songs: "In a Clock Store" and "In a Bird Store". "In a Clock Store" is his most memorable. He died at Columbia Hospital after a brief illness on February 1, 1921. Orth donated his papers to the Milwaukee Public Library.

== Work ==
- "A Saturday Night"(n.d.)
- "A Soldier's Love"(n.d.)
- "The Advance and Retreat of the Salvation Army" (1892)
- "In a Clock Store (Im Uhrenladen)" (1893)
- "Coxey's Industrial Army Patrol" (1894)
- "Ein Hoch!"(n.d.)
- "In a Bird Store" (1896)
- "Love's Melody" (1898)
- "The Capture of Santiago" (1898?)
- "Dance of the Water Nymphs" (n.d.)
- "Forest Scenes" (1903)
- "Bandmaster's Pride March" (1903)
- "Capricious Ninette" (1903)
- "Draper Hall March" (1908)
- "The August March" (1908)
- "On the Battlefield of Life" (1908)
- "Régi história ez!" (n.d.)
- "Salute"(n.d.)
- "Spanish Beggar Girl"(n.d.)
- "The Toastmaster March" (1909)
- "Story is always the same"(n.d.)
- "Sweethearts"(n.d.)
