= Bernice Redington =

American home economics expert and journalist

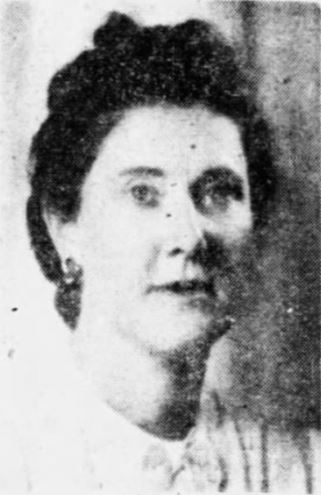
Bernice Orpha Redington

Bernice Orpha Redington (December 9, 1891 – March 9, 1966) was a home economics expert and journalist, her bylines being Prudence Penny, Carolyn Cuisine and Mary Mills.

== Early life ==
Bernice Orpha Redington was born on December 9, 1891, in Puyallup, Washington, the daughter of Col. John W. Redington and Elinor Meacham. John Redington was a pioneer newspaper publisher. She was the granddaughter of Alfred B. Meacham.

She studied at University of Washington, State College of Washington, and University of California where she studied art. She was a 1937 graduate nutritionist with a practical experience in food preservation. She studied under Dr. E. V. McCollum of the Johns Hopkins University.

== Career ==
After graduation she worked as a dietitian at the State School for the Blind in Vancouver, Washington, and at various advertising agencies.

Since 1923 she was the editor of the homekeeper's section of the Seattle Post-Intelligencer. She was its the first food editor and used the byline of "Prudence Penny". Formerly she was with Tacoma Tribune and Tacoma Ledger. She resigned from the Post-Intelligencer in 1936 and joined the American Newspaper Guild; she testified at a national labor relations board hearing of the guild that the staff was warned membership in the guild "presented an excellent opportunity for martyrdom." The hearing was on the guild's complaint that the Post-Intelligencer discharged photographer Frank M. Lynch and drama critic Evehardt Armstrong for guild activities. Redington said the anti-guild warning came at a meeting called at the request of C.B. Lindeman, associate publisher, and addressed by Marian Stixrood, who was promoted to women's editor.

In 1936 she moved to Honolulu, Hawaii, and joined The Honolulu Star-Bulletin as home economics editor and The Hawaii Farm and Home Magazine as women's editor. Her byline was "Carolyn Cuisine".

During World War II she was a technical assistant of the War Food Administration and lectured in community canning. She was the assistant of Ben H. Body; Body was engaged in commercial canning operations. She became a home canning expert and won widespread acclaim as a conductor of cooking schools on the Pacific Coast. She gave demonstrations for the San Francisco Chapter of the American Red Cross. and worked out some original canning recipes. She was the originator of "Chalk Talks", illustrating home canning by means of simple diagrams.

In 1946 she was appointed by the Department of Public Instruction to the Adult Education division.

In 1948 she went back living in Seattle and became the home economics director for the Fisher Flouring Mills, with headquarters in Seattle. She was in charge of home economics activities for the mills for the states of Washington, Oregon, California and Arizona, and made frequent trips to these states, giving demonstrations on cooking methods and home making. She conducted a series of classes and demonstrations which she called "It pays to be lazy." She signed her articles as "Mary Mills" and was well known for her radio programs for Fisher.

She was the author of Old-time quilts: a collection of old-time quilt patterns chosen from entries in the Post-intelligencer quilt show January, 1927 and of other two books, one a cook book. She also did free-lance writing.

She was a member of Mountaineers, Alpha Delta Pi, the San Francisco Ad Club, the American Association of University Women, and the John Knox Presbyterian Church.

She retired in 1964 and became active in community affairs in Normandy Park.

== Personal life ==
Bernice Orpha Redington was a lifelong resident of the state of Washington. In 1950 she built a house at Normandy Park, on Puget Sound, south of Seattle, and called it "Hale Malowaa" which means "House of Laziness".

She died on March 9, 1966.
