= Borzecki =

Borzecki or Borzęcki (feminine: Borzecka, Borzęcka) is a Polish surname. Notable people with the surname include:

- Adam Borzecki (born 1978), Polish-German ice hockey player
- Celine Borzecka (1833–1913), Catholic professed religious
- Charles Borzecki (1880–1959), World War I flying ace
- Hedwig Borzecka (1863–1906), Polish religious sister
- Konstanty Borzęcki (1826–1876), participant in Polish uprisings and later Ottoman pasha, strategist, and writer

== See also ==
- Borzecki 2RB, Polish air-cooled, four-cylinder, horizontally opposed, two-stroke, piston engine use in motor gliders
