= Norwood Park, Chicago =

Community area in Chicago, Illinois

Norwood Park
- Community area
- Community Area 10 - Norwood Park
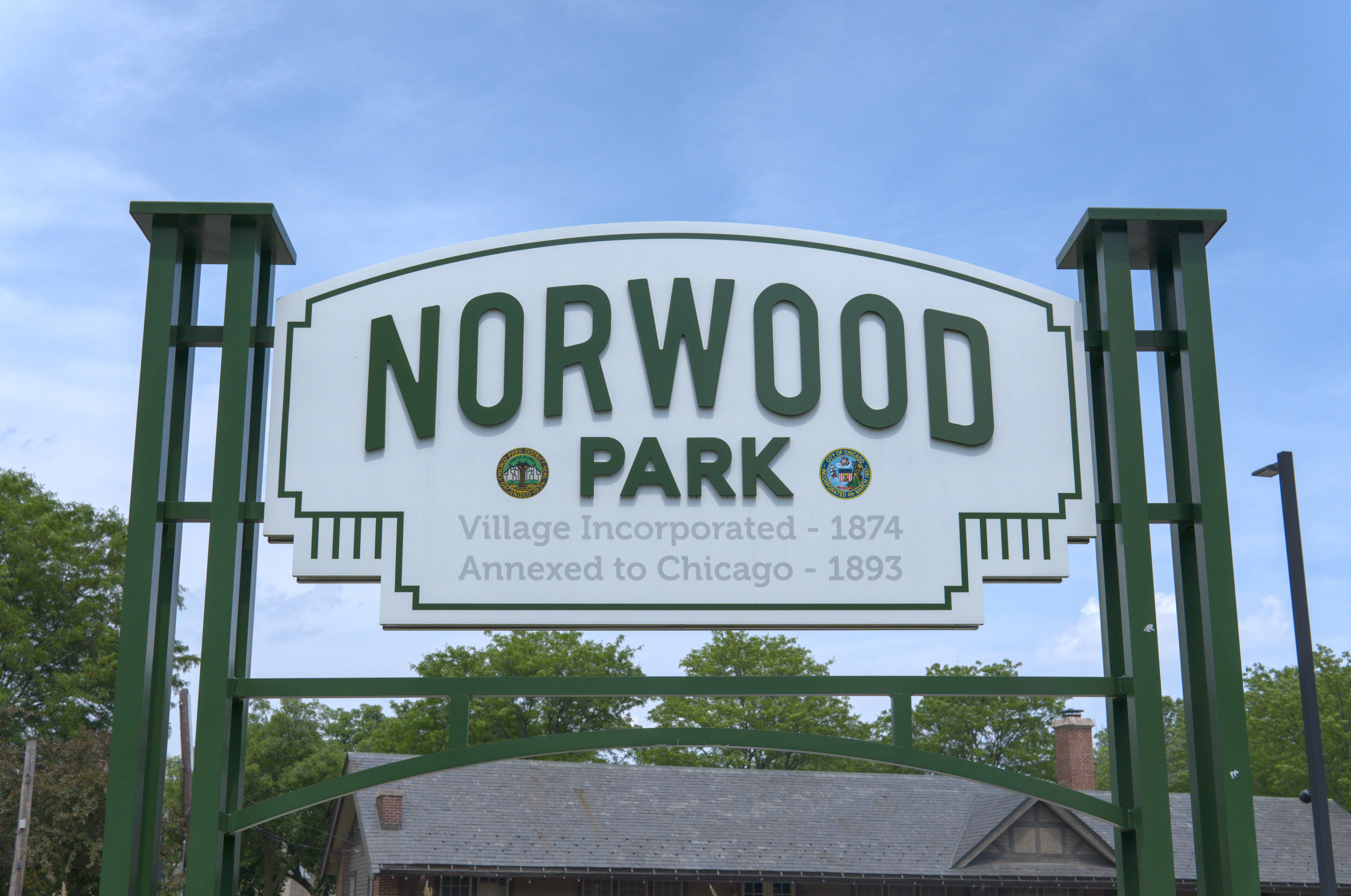
- Norwood Park sign in 2025

- Location within the city of Chicago
- Coordinates: 41°58.8′N 87°48.0′W
- Country: United States
- State: Illinois
- County: Cook
- City: Chicago
- Named for: Norwood, or Village Life in New England (1868 novel)
- Neighborhoods: list: Norwood Park; Old Norwood Park; Oriole Park; Union Ridge; Big Oaks

Area
  - Total: 4.29 sq mi (11.11 km^{2})

Population (2024)
  - Total: 39,840
  - Density: 9,288/sq mi (3,586/km^{2})

Demographics 2024
  - White: 70.6%
  - Black: 1.0%
  - Hispanic: 18.0%
  - Asian: 7.0%
  - Other: 3.4%
- Time zone: UTC-6 (CST)
  - Summer (DST): UTC-5 (CDT)
- ZIP Codes: parts of 60631, 60646, 60656
- Median household income (2022): $107,122
- Source: U.S. Census, Record Information Services

Norwood Park is one of the 77 community areas of Chicago, Illinois, United States. It encompasses the smaller neighborhoods of Big Oaks, Norwood Park East, Norwood Park West, Old Norwood Park, Oriole Park, and Union Ridge.

The community area contains the oldest extant building in Chicago, the Noble–Seymour–Crippen House, built in 1833 and greatly expanded in 1868. The area was organized in 1873 as a township from the adjacent townships of Jefferson, Leyden, Niles, and Maine, and named after Henry Ward Beecher's 1868 novel Norwood, or Village Life in New England. The word "Park" added to account for another post office in Illinois with the Norwood name). Norwood Park was incorporated as a village in 1874 and annexed to Chicago on November 7, 1893.

Every Memorial Day since 1922 there has been a parade that runs through Norwood Park. William Howard Taft High School, best known as the inspiration for the musical Grease, was completed in 1939 with major additions made in 1959 and 1974.

== History ==
The first inhabitant of European descent in the area was Mark Noble, who arrived in 1833 and constructed a house that is still standing as of 2024, the oldest in the Chicago city limits. English farmers were the main group in the 1830s, although they would later be supplanted by Germans and to a lesser extent Poles and Scandinavians. In 1853 the Illinois and Wisconsin Railroad, which would eventually become the Chicago and North Western Railway and is currently Metra's Union Pacific Northwest Line, laid tracks in the area, and in 1868 the Norwood Land and Building Association was formed and purchased the land. A hotel was constructed shortly thereafter in an attempt to lure tourists from Chicago, although it was ultimately unsuccessful. The first Post Office and store were built respectively in 1870 and 1871.

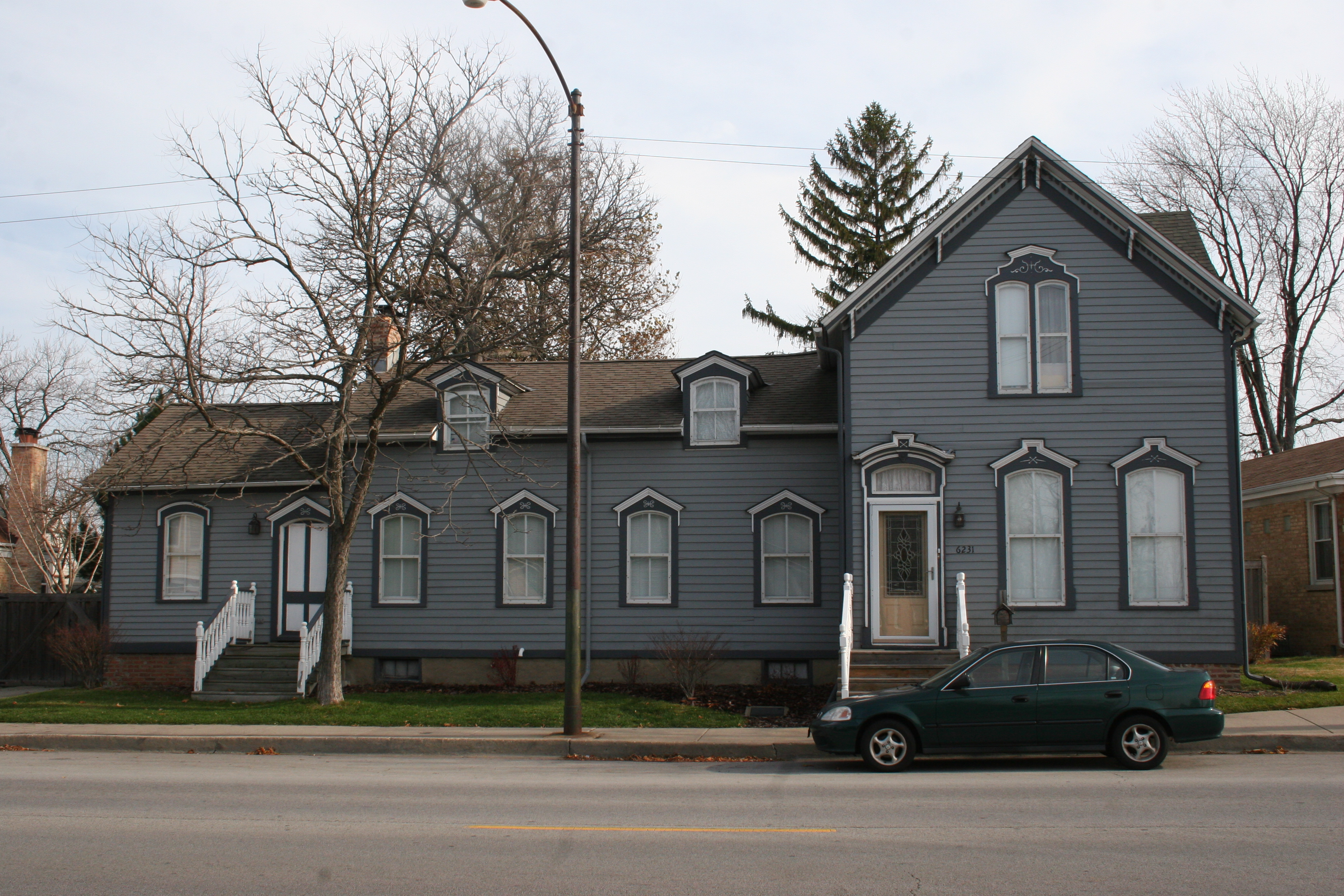
Wingert House, part of the Norwood Park Historical District and a Chicago Landmark, constructed in 1854 and expanded between 1868 and 1875.

Upon its incorporation the Village of Norwood Park prohibited the sale of alcohol. As of April 2014 there were still eight dry precincts in the community area. The first liquor store in the area in 50 years opened in 2016, without controversy about its existence but with such restrictions on its operation as early closing hours and a price minimum of $5.99.

During the 1920s such roads as Foster Avenue, Milwaukee Avenue, Devon Avenue, Northwest Highway, and Harlem Avenue were improved, further facilitating transportation between Norwood Park and its surroundings. The fieldhouse of the eponymous Norwood Park was built in 1928. Between 1930 and 1940 the area added approximately 2,000 residents despite the Great Depression. The Kennedy Expressway was constructed nearby in the 1950s although the historic buildings of Old Norwood were unaffected. The Norwood Park Chamber of Commerce was incorporated on May 20, 1977. The City of Chicago recognized the Norwood Park Historical District in 1986 and declared the Noble-Seymour-Crippen House a Chicago Landmark on May 11, 1988. The Noble-Seymour-Crippen House was placed on the National Register of Historic Places on August 11, 2000.

== Neighborhoods ==
=== Norwood Park ===
The Roden branch of the Chicago Public Library system is located in the Norwood Park, serving Edison Park as well.

Public grade schools in Norwood Park include William J. Onahan Public School, located on West Raven Street, and Rufus M. Hitch Public School. Edison Park Elementary School is located in Norwood Park, despite the name implying a location in Edison Park.

St. Thecla Catholic School and Parish operated in Norwood Park until 2019, when the school and parish closed and merged with others on the northwest side of Chicago. The property was sold to Philadelphia Romanian Church of God in 2023. It is also home to Immaculate Conception Catholic School, which operates Chicago's oldest bowling alley in its school basement. Resurrection Medical Center and Resurrection High School were both founded and run by the Sisters of the Resurrection.

=== Norwood Park Historical District (Old Norwood) ===
The Norwood Park Historical District, also known as Old Norwood, was recognized by the City of Chicago in 1986. It contains the Noble-Seymour-Crippen House, Wingert House, Taft High School, and the Norwood Park Public School.

=== Big Oaks ===
Big Oaks is bounded by Foster Avenue to the north, Nagle Avenue to the east, Gunnison Street to the south, and Harlem Avenue to the west. Opposite of the neighborhood's southern border at Gunnison Street is the suburb of Harwood Heights and an unincorporated area housing Ridgemoor Country Club. Many of the city's police officers live in Big Oaks, and in recent years the area has seen an increase in the number of Polish immigrants.

At one time, the area was dominated by a large golf course called Big Oaks Golf Course. In the early 1950s, the golf course was demolished, and hundreds of homes replaced it.

The neighborhood contains three schools: Daniel Carter Beard Elementary School, located on West Strong Avenue, John W. Garvy Elementary School, located on West Foster Avenue, and St. Monica Academy, located on North Mont Clare Avenue.

=== Oriole Park ===
Oriole Park is bordered by the Kennedy Expressway to the north, Foster Ave to the south, Harlem Avenue to the east, and Cumberland Avenue to the west.

The area is home to Oriole Park, which is located in the center of the neighborhood south of Bryn Mawr Avenue. The park covers over 18 acres (7.3 ha) of land. The park is a Chicago Park District facility.

The Oriole Park Library is located on Balmoral Avenue next to Oriole Park Elementary School. It operates under the Chicago Public Library.

The neighborhood contains two schools: Oriole Park Elementary School, located on Oketo and Balmoral Avenues, and St. Eugene Catholic School, located on Foster and Canfield Avenues.

Due to its proximity on the edge of Chicago and its suburban feel, Oriole Park residents are primarily city workers, such as teachers, police officers, union workers and firefighters.

=== Union Ridge ===
Union Ridge, one of the highest points of Cook County, is bounded by Bryn Mawr, Foster, Nagle, and Harlem Avenues. Union Ridge contains no schools. Union Ridge Cemetery is located on Higgins and Talcott Avenues.

== Demographics ==
As of 2015, the median household income of the community area was $71,282 and the median age was 44.3. 80.1% of the population was White, 0.9% was Black, 4.2% was Asian, and 2.2% was Other. Hispanics or Latinos of any race were 11.8% of the population. This is a marked change from 2000, when Whites were 92.7% of the population and Hispanics or Latinos were 6.4%.

Although predominantly Irish, the Norwood Park neighborhood has a substantial Serbian-American community, centered on Serbian Road and the Serbian Orthodox Cathedral. There is a K-8 Serbian-American School, Saint Sava Academy, and an annual Serbian festival "Serb Fest" which takes place on Serbian Road. During 1990-1999 more than 500 Serbian families from Croatia and another 700 from Bosnia became settled refugees in Norwood Park. Although many have since moved into Edison Park, Park Ridge, Harwood Heights, and Schiller Park, Norwood Park remains the hub of Serbian migrants in Chicago.

Historical population
Census	Pop.	Note	%±
1930	14,408		—
1940	16,466		14.3%
1950	26,798		62.7%
1960	40,953		52.8%
1970	41,995		2.5%
1980	40,586		−3.4%
1990	37,697		−7.1%
2000	37,619		−0.2%
2010	37,023		−1.6%
2020	38,303		3.5%

== Politics ==
=== Local ===
The community area is split between the 39th, 41st, and 45th wards of the Chicago City Council, where it is represented by Democrat Samantha Nugent, Independent Anthony Napolitano, and Democrat Jim Gardiner respectively.

Aldermen who have represented Norwood Park since 1893
Years	27th Ward^{a}		41st Ward	45th Ward	39th Ward
1893 – 1894	Mathew J. Conway, Republican	Frederick F. Haussen, Republican	No such ward	No such ward	No such ward
1894 – 1895	Mathew J. Conway, Republican	Hubert W. Butler, Republican	No such ward	No such ward	No such ward
1895 – 1897	George S. Foster, Democratic	Hubert W. Butler, Republican	No such ward	No such ward	No such ward
1897 – 1899	Spencer S. Kimbell, Republican	Hubert W. Butler, Republican	No such ward	No such ward	No such ward
1899 – 1900	Arthur F. Keeney, Republican	Hubert W. Butler, Republican	No such ward	No such ward	No such ward
1900 – 1902	Arthur F. Keeney, Republican	Henry Wulff, Independent	No such ward	No such ward	No such ward
1902 – 1903	Arthur F. Keeney, Republican	Hubert W. Butler, Republican	No such ward	No such ward	No such ward
1903 – 1905	Silas F. Leachman, Democratic	Hubert W. Butler, Republican	No such ward	No such ward	No such ward
1905 – 1906	Henry J. Siewert, Republican	Hubert W. Butler, Republican	No such ward	No such ward	No such ward
1906 – 1908	Henry J. Siewert, Republican	Hans Blase, Democratic	No such ward	No such ward	No such ward
1908 – 1909	Henry J. Siewert, Republican	James F. Clancy, Republican	No such ward	No such ward	No such ward
1909 – 1910	Joseph F. Capp, Republican	James F. Clancy, Republican	No such ward	No such ward	No such ward
1910 – 1911	Joseph F. Capp, Republican	Frank J. Wilson, Democratic	No such ward	No such ward	No such ward
1911 – 1913	Jens N. Hyldahl, Democratic	Frank J. Wilson, Democratic	No such ward	No such ward	No such ward
1913 – 1914	George E. Trebing, Democratic	Frank J. Wilson, Democratic	No such ward	No such ward	No such ward
1914 – 1915	George E. Trebing, Democratic	Oliver L. Watson, Independent	No such ward	No such ward	No such ward
1915 – 1919	John C. Kennedy, Socialist	Oliver L. Watson, Independent	No such ward	No such ward	No such ward
1919 – 1920	Edward R. Armitage, Republican	Oliver L. Watson, Independent	No such ward	No such ward	No such ward
1920 – 1923	Edward R. Armitage, Republican	Christ A. Jensen, Democratic	No such ward	No such ward	No such ward
1923 – 1930	Not in ward		Thomas J. Bowler, Democratic	Not in ward	Not in ward
1930 – 1931	Not in ward		Vacant	Not in ward	Not in ward
1931 – 1935	Not in ward		James C. Moreland, Republican	Not in ward	Not in ward
1935 – 1947	Not in ward		William J. Cowhey, Democratic	Not in ward	Not in ward
1947 – 1958	Not in ward		Joseph P. Immel Jr., Republican	Not in ward	Not in ward
1958 – 1959	Not in ward		Vacant	Not in ward	Not in ward
1959 – 1963	Not in ward		Harry Bell, Democratic	Not in ward	Not in ward
1963 – 1972	Not in ward		Edward T. Scholl, Republican	Not in ward	Not in ward
1972 – 1973	Not in ward		Vacant	Not in ward	Not in ward
1973 – 1983	Not in ward		Roman Pucinski, Democratic	Not in ward	Not in ward
1983 – 1987	Not in ward		Roman Pucinski, Democratic	Gerald McLaughlin, Democratic	Not in ward
1987 – 1991	Not in ward		Roman Pucinski, Democratic	Patrick Levar, Democratic	Not in ward
1991 – 2011	Not in ward		Brian Doherty, Republican	Patrick Levar, Democratic	Not in ward
2011 – 2015	Not in ward		Mary O'Connor, Democratic	John Arena, Democratic	Not in ward
2015 – 2019	Not in ward		Anthony Napolitano, Republican	John Arena, Democratic	Margaret Laurino, Democratic
2019 – present	Not in ward		Anthony Napolitano, Republican	Jim Gardiner, Independent	Margaret Laurino, Democratic
^a Prior to 1923 Chicago comprised 35 wards, each electing two aldermen in staggered two-year terms.

In the Cook County Board of Commissioners the large majority of the area is in the 9th district, represented by Republican Peter N. Silvestri, while the eastern parts of Norwood Park East, Union Ridge, and Big Oaks are in the 10th district, represented by Democrat Bridget Gainer. As of 2018 Silvestri is the only Republican County Commissioner representing a part of the City of Chicago.

=== State ===
In the Illinois House of Representatives the majority of the community area is located within District 20, represented by Republican Michael P. McAuliffe, while most of Union Ridge and Big Oaks is in District 19, represented by Democrat Robert Martwick, and a tiny fraction in the northeast is part of District 15, represented by Democrat John D'Amico.

In the Illinois Senate the vast majority of the community area is located within District 10, represented by Democrat John G. Mulroe, while a tiny part in the northeast is part of District 8, represented by Democrat Ira I. Silverstein.

=== Federal ===
In the United States House of Representatives it is split between Illinois's 5th and Illinois's 9th congressional districts, where it is respectively represented by Democrats Mike Quigley and Jan Schakowsky.

Norwood Park has supported the Democratic nominee for President in the past two presidential elections. In the 2016 presidential election, Norwood Park cast 9,894 votes (51.81%) for Hillary Clinton and cast 8,280 votes (43.36%) for Donald Trump. In the 2012 presidential election, Norwood Park cast 8,441 votes (54.19%) for Barack Obama and cast 6,833 votes (43.86%) for Mitt Romney.

== Education ==
Chicago Public Schools serves Norwood Park, as the aforementioned schools are located in and serve the area. Taft High School is in Norwood Park, serving the entire community area for public education, while for secondary education Luther North and Resurrection High Schools are also in the area.

== Relation to Grease Musical ==
Grease creator Jim Jacobs attended Taft High School, which was used as the backdrop to Grease. Much of what is in the play is based on his experience growing up in Norwood Park during the 1950s and 1960s. He has stated that the characters of Grease were based on actual people he attended school with. A 2011 reproduction of the original Grease musical by American Theater Company in Chicago revisited Norwood Park's influence on the production. During the reproduction, many Chicago references were put in, including references to the characters living on "Chicago's Northwest side" as middle class first-generation Americans with parents who worked in local factories. Also mentioned were local favorites, including the hot dog restaurant Superdawg.

== Notable residents ==
- Ral Donner (1943–1984), early American rock and roll musician and singer.
- Robert Hanssen (1944–2023), former FBI agent who spied for Soviet and Russian intelligence services against the United States from 1979 to 2001.
- Jim Jacobs (born 1942), creator of the musical Grease. He was raised in Norwood Park.
- Terry Kath (1946–1978), guitarist, founding member of the band Chicago
- Edward Stanley Michael (1918–1994), pilot in the United States Army Air Forces and awardee of the Medal of Honor. He was raised at 6616 West Schreiber Avenue.
- Louise Schaaf (1906–2020), supercentenarian notable for being, at the time of her death, the oldest person in Illinois and the oldest known person born in Germany. She resided in Norwood Park from 1959 until her death in 2020
- Joseph Sikora (born 1976), actor known for his portrayal of Tommy Egan in Power. He was a childhood resident of Norwood Park.
- Jack Suwinski (born 1998), professional baseball player playing for the Pittsburgh Pirates in the MLB. Suwinski was born and lived in Norwood Park for his childhood.
