= Norwood Park Historic District =

Norwood Park Historic District may refer to

- Norwood Park Historical District, Chicago, Illinois
- Norwood Park Historic District (Asheville, North Carolina), among the National Register of Historic Places listings in Buncombe County, North Carolina
