= Mother Borzecka =

Mother Borzecka can refer to either of the following:

- Celine Borzecka, foundress of the Congregation of the Sisters of the Resurrection
- Hedwig Borzecka, daughter of Celine and co-foundress of the Congregation of the Sisters of the Resurrection
