= Wingert House =

House in Chicago

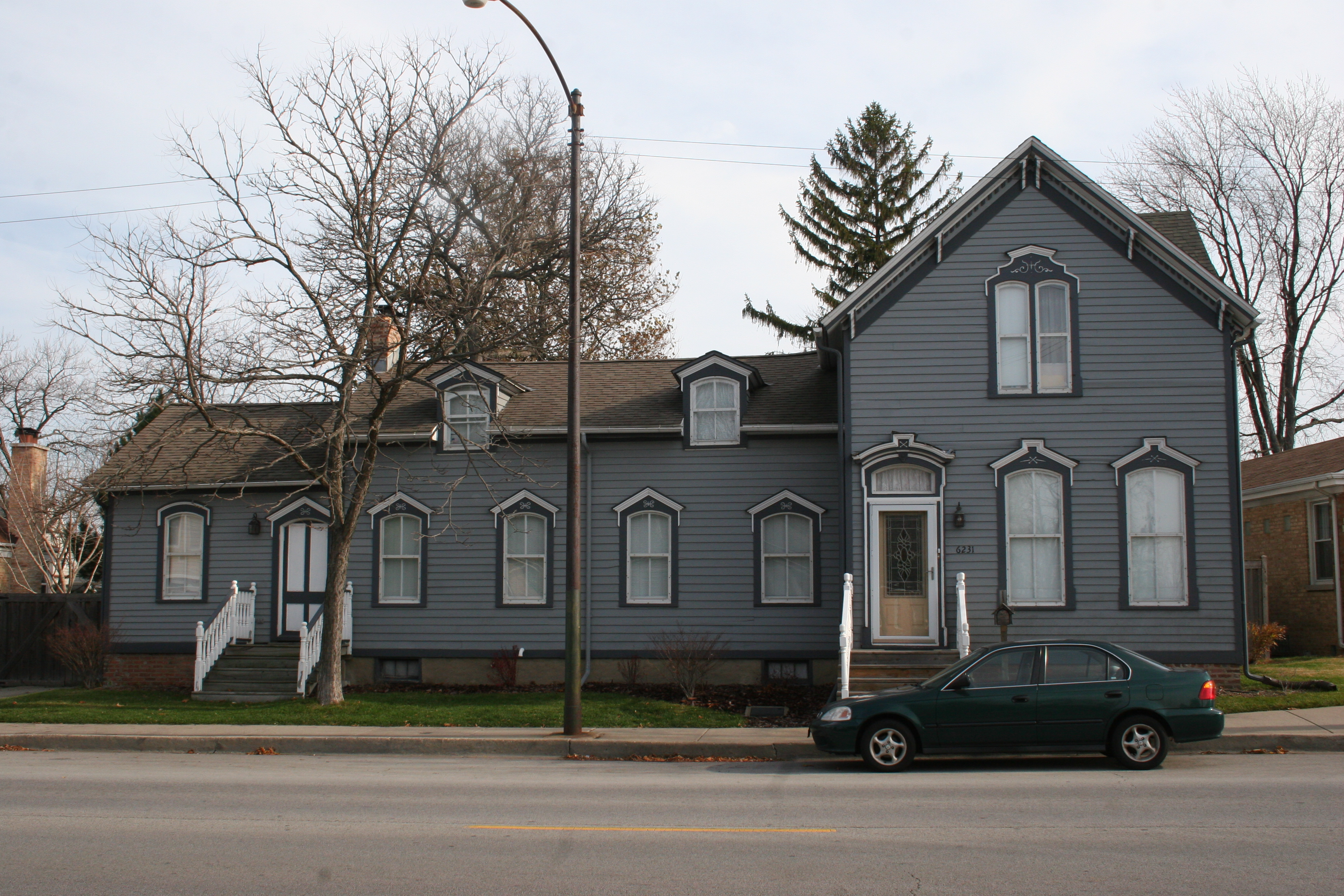
- Front view of Wingert House in Norwood Park West, Chicago, IL

- Location within Chicago metropolitan area Location within Illinois Location within the United States
- 41.9943°N 87.8218°W
- Type: Building
- Location: 6231 N. Canfield Ave. Chicago, Illinois, United States

History
- Built: 1854; Additions, 1865–1875
- Built for: John Wingert
- Original use: Farmhouse

Site notes
- Architectural style: Italianate

Chicago Landmark
- Official name: Wingert House
- Type: Building
- Designated: 31 July 1990

The Wingert House is a nineteenth-century farmhouse located at 6231 North Canfield Avenue in the Norwood Park neighborhood of Chicago, Illinois, United States. One of the oldest surviving farmhouses within Chicago's city limits, the building received Chicago Landmark status on July 31, 1990.

The house was built in 1854 as the home of John Wingert, a German immigrant who had fled his home country due to religious persecution. A two-story Italianate style section was added between 1868 and 1875. The Wingert House is one of the few extant buildings in Chicago that predate the Great Fire of 1871.

== Fire ==
The Wingert House caught fire on March 10, 2021 and suffered some damage to its rear. The home was rehabbed and sold in April 2024.

== See also ==
- Noble–Seymour–Crippen House, also located in Norwood Park
