= Tunzi (surname) =

Tunzi is a surname. Notable people with the surname include:

- Joseph A. Tunzi (born 1953), American author
- Zozibini Tunzi (born 1993), South African model
