= Norwood Park Historical District =

Historic district in Illinois, United States

- U.S. National Register of Historic Places
- U.S. Historic district
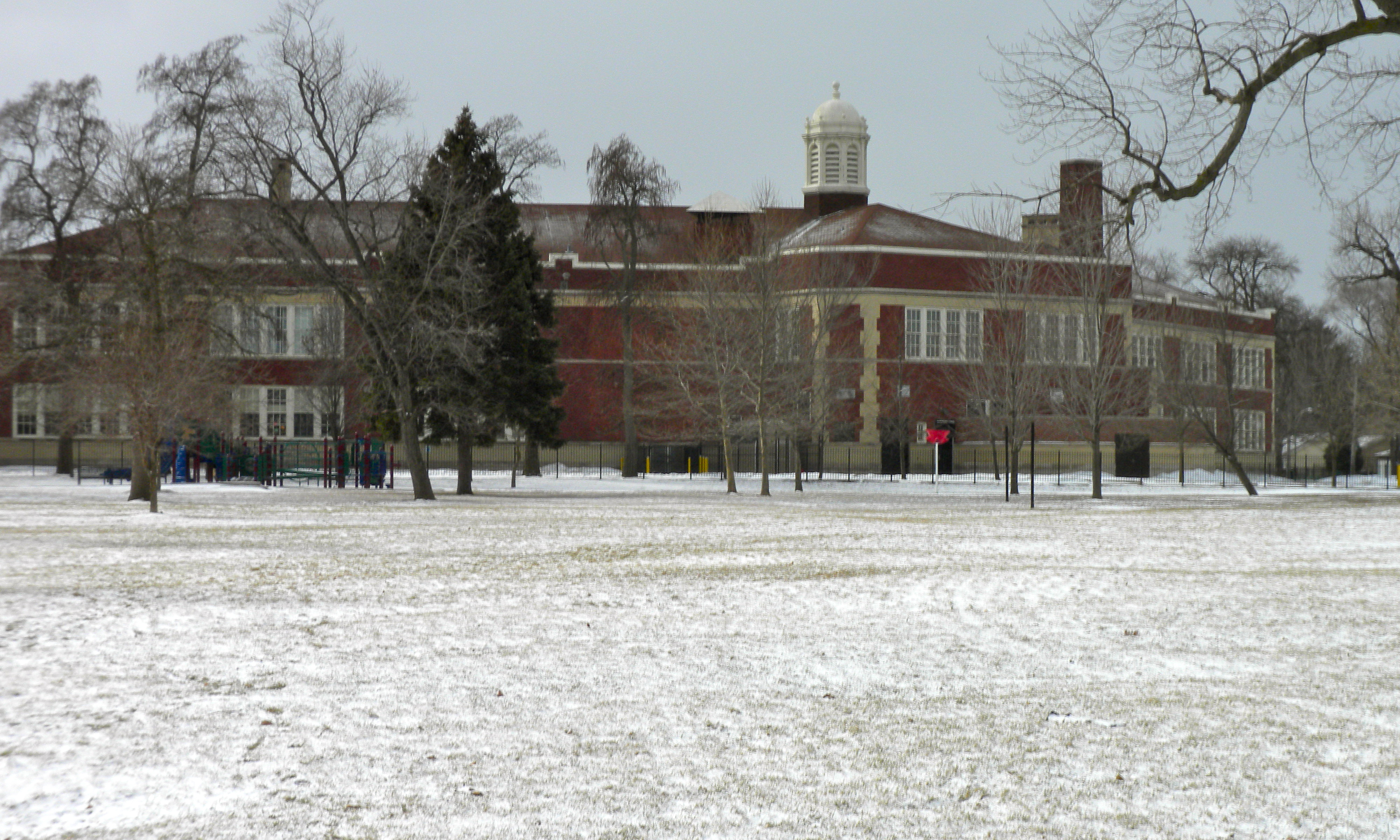

- Location within Chicago metropolitan area Location within Illinois Location within the United States
- Location: Bordered by Harlem Ave., Bryn Mawr Ave., and Avondale Ave. Chicago, Illinois
- Coordinates: 41°59′21″N 87°47′59″W
- Architect: Mahaffey; et al.
- Architectural style: Queen Anne, Tudor Revival
- NRHP reference No.: 02001350
- Added to NRHP: November 21, 2002

The Norwood Park Historical District (also known as Old Norwood) is a historic district in the Norwood Park neighborhood of Chicago, Illinois. It is bordered by Bryn Mawr, Avondale, and Harlem Avenues, and is home to the Noble-Seymour-Crippen House, which was built in 1833 and is widely considered to be the oldest house in Chicago. (However, it was not located in Chicago at the time it was built; Norwood Park was annexed to Chicago in 1893.) The historic district is also home to Norwood Park Public School, William Howard Taft High School, Norwood Park (the park), Myrtle Park, and Norwood Circle Park. The district was added to the National Register of Historic Places in 2002.

The district was first settled in 1833, when Mark Noble Sr. built his house northwest of Chicago, Illinois. However, the area remained sparsely populated when the Chicago and North Western Railway built a station there in 1864. The Norwood Park Land and Building Association (NPLBA) formed in 1868 to purchase 860 acres (350 ha) of farmland with the intention of developing a suburb. The organization was led by Thomas H. Seymour, a broker at the Chicago Board of Trade, and educator John Eberhart. The town was named after the novel Norwood, or Village Life in New England by Henry Ward Beecher; "Park" was added because another Illinois post office already held the Norwood name.
