= John Mulroe =

American politician and judge

John G. Mulroe
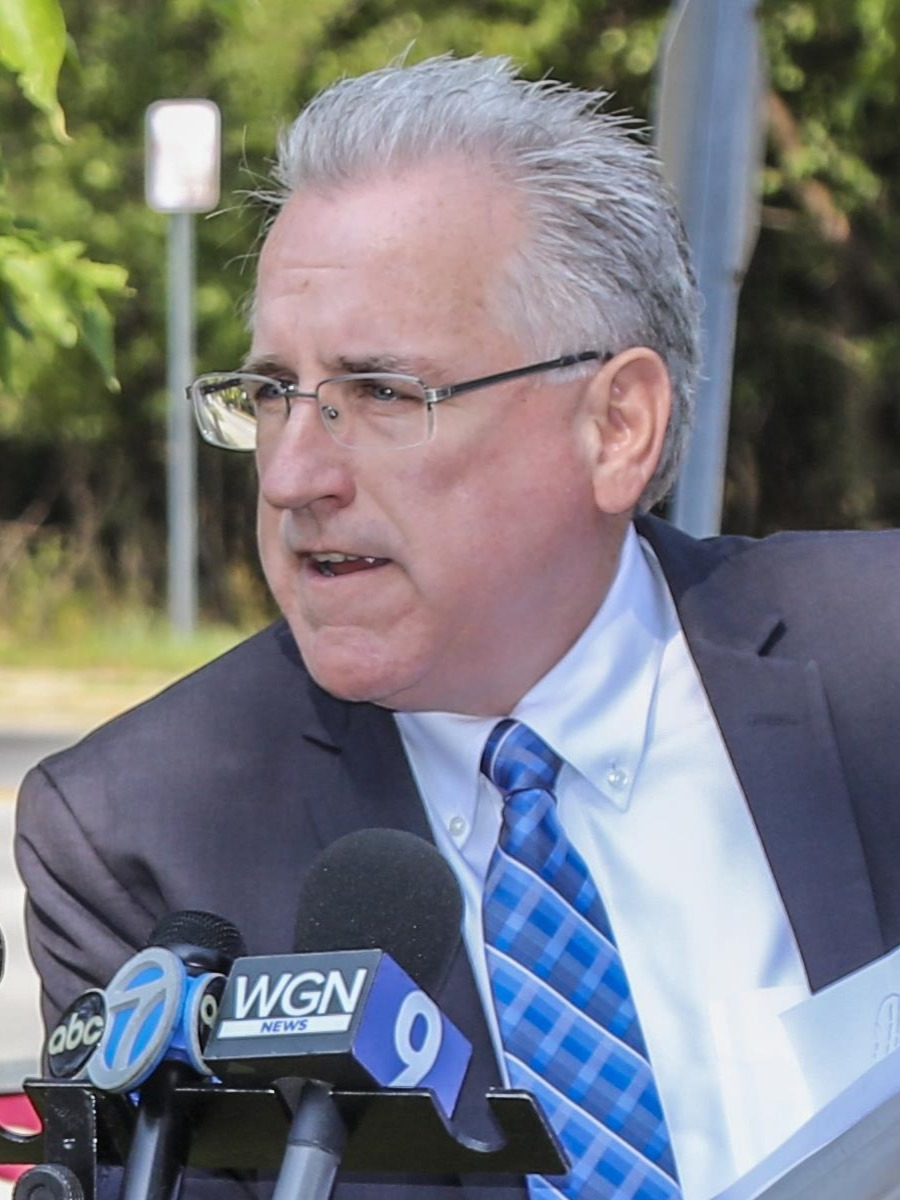
- Mulroe in 2017

Judge of the Cook County Circuit Court for the Tenth Judicial Subcircuit
- Incumbent
- Assumed office June 21, 2019
- Nominated by: Mary Jane Theis
- Appointed by: Illinois Supreme Court
- Preceded by: Thomas R. Allen

Member of the Illinois Senate from the 10th district
- In office August 2010 – June 21, 2019
- Preceded by: James DeLeo
- Succeeded by: Robert Martwick

Personal details
- Born: July 21, 1959 (age 67) Chicago, Illinois
- Party: Democratic
- Spouse: Margaret
- Children: Four
- Education: Loyola University
- Profession: Attorney, accountant
- Website: Campaign Site

John G. Mulroe (born July 21, 1959) is a judge of the Circuit Court of Cook County and lawyer from Chicago, Illinois. Between August 2010 and June 2019, he was a Democratic state senator, representing the 10th Illinois State Senate District. He was appointed to complete the term of Democrat James DeLeo in August 2010 and elected to a full term in the Illinois State Senate in November 2010. He served in the position for nearly nine years before leaving the Illinois Senate in 2019. Robert Martwick replaced Mulroe in the Illinois Senate.

== 2008 judicial election ==
John G. Mulroe was the president of the 41st Ward Democratic Organization and ran unsuccessfully in the 2008 Democratic primary for a judicial seat in Subcircuit No. 10 of the Cook County Circuit Court. In that election Mulroe finished second to Diana L. Kenworthy. Out of more than 42,000 ballots cast for the seat on the 10th Subcircuit, Mulroe received 16,513 votes (38.42%) to Kenworthy's 17,914 (41.68%). A third candidate, Rosaire Marie Hall, garnered 19.91% with 8556 votes. Kenworthy went on to win the general election.

== Illinois Senate ==
=== 2010 Illinois State Senate election ===
Mulroe was the 2010 Democratic candidate for the Illinois State Senate in the 10th State Senate District, a seat formerly held by retired Democrat James DeLeo, a 25-year veteran of the state legislature. He won the Democratic primary on February 2, 2010, against three other Democratic candidates, collecting a total of 10,036 votes. Those votes amounted to 42.5% of total votes cast. The other candidates collected 57.5% of the total; Tom Ryan had 24.5%, Mary Sendra Anselmo had 22.3% and Wanda Majcher finished with 10.7%. DeLeo chose to leave office in August 2010 and Democratic candidate John G. Mulroe was appointed to complete the remainder of his term. Mulroe ran for a full term in the November 2010 general election.

Prior to his appointment to office, Mulroe's primary victory set up a general election contest with Chicago's only Republican alderman, Brian Doherty. During the primary election Mulroe received the endorsement of the Chicago Tribune's editorial board over the three other Democratic candidates. He also received numerous other endorsements from newspapers, unions and elected officials.

Mulroe won election to a full term in the Illinois State Senate on November 2, 2010. His opponent, Doherty, conceded the election shortly after 9 p.m. on election night. As of November 5, 2010 Mulroe had collected 29,357 votes, 55.4% of the total, topping Doherty's 23,611 votes, 44.6% of the total votes cast.

== Judicial career ==
Mulroe was recommended by Mary Jane Theis and appointed by the Illinois Supreme Court to the judicial vacancy created by the retirement of Judge Thomas R. Allen in Circuit Court of Cook County's 10th Subcircuit. The subcircuit includes all or parts of Harwood Heights, Norridge, Glenview, Park Ridge, Des Plaines, Morton Grove, Niles, and the Chicago neighborhoods of Edison Park, Norwood Park, Jefferson Park, and Forest Glen. The appointment is effective June 21, 2019 and will conclude December 7, 2020, when the position will be filled by the November 2020 General Election.

== Electoral history ==
2008 Democratic primary results - Judge, 10th Cook County Subcircuit
Party	Candidate	Votes	%
Democratic	Diana L. Kenworthy	17,914	41.68
Democratic	John G. Mulroe	16,513	38.42
Democratic	Rosaire Marie Hall	8,556	19.91
Total votes		42,983	100

2010 Democratic primary results - State senator, 10th district
Party	Candidate	Votes	%
Democratic	John G. Mulroe	9,453	43.28
Democratic	Thomas M. Ryan	5,290	24.22
Democratic	Mary Sendra Anselmo	4,820	22.07
Democratic	Wanda Majcher	2,281	10.44
Total votes		21,844	100

2010 General election results - State senator, 10th district
Party	Candidate	Votes	%
Democratic	John G. Mulroe	29,357	55.4
Republican	Brian G. Doherty	23,611	44.6
Total votes		52,968	100

== Personal life ==
Mulroe is a 1977 graduate of St. Patrick High School in Chicago. He has been married to his wife Margaret for more than two decades and they have four children together. He graduated from Loyola University with a BBA in accounting and attended Loyola University Law School where he earned his Juris Doctor. In his professional life Mulroe spent six years as an assistant state's attorney and more than a decade in private practice.
