= Jack Suwinski =

American baseball player (born 1998)

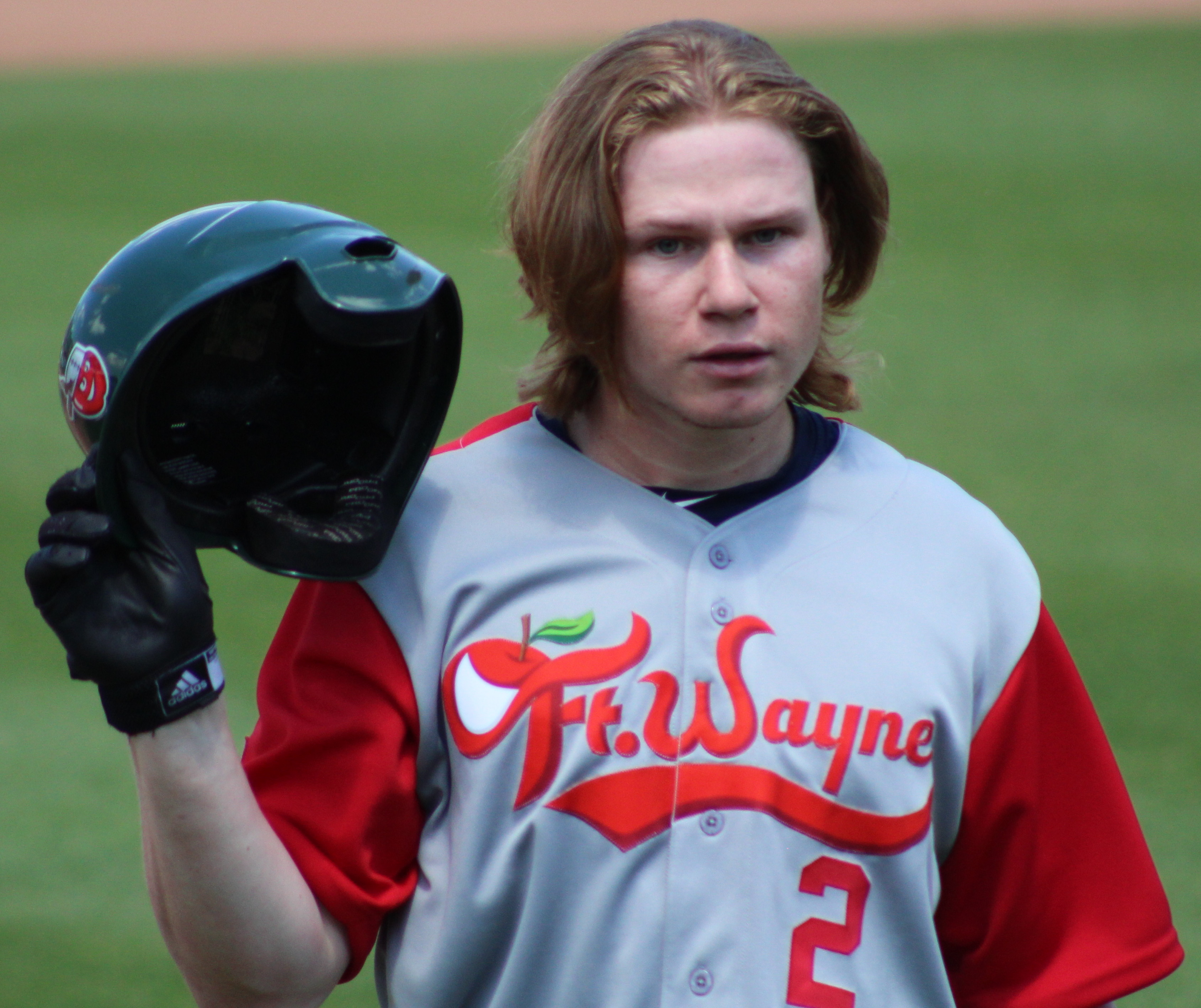
- Suwinski with the Fort Wayne TinCaps in 2018

Tampa Bay Rays
- Outfielder
- Born: July 29, 1998 (age 28); Chicago, Illinois, U.S.
- Bats: Left Throws: Left

MLB debut
- April 26, 2022, for the Pittsburgh Pirates

MLB statistics (through 2025 season)
- Batting average: .199
- Home runs: 57
- Runs batted in: 148
- Stats at Baseball Reference

Teams
- Pittsburgh Pirates (2022–2025)

Jack William Suwinski (born July 29, 1998) is an American professional baseball outfielder for the Tampa Bay Rays of Major League Baseball (MLB). He has previously played in MLB for the Pittsburgh Pirates, for whom he made his MLB debut in 2022.

== Early life and amateur career ==
Jack Suwinski was born in Norwood Park, Chicago, Illinois, on July 29, 1998. He is the third child of parents Tim and Ann Suwinski. He has two older sisters, Natalie and Heidi. His aspirations for baseball began during second grade career day at Norwood Park Elementary, where he wanted to be a baseball player. Suwinski began playing baseball at the age of 6, playing Norwood Park local tee-ball, and started playing on a travel team for baseball at the age of nine. He attended Taft High School in Chicago, playing high school baseball with the school. Suwinski committed to play college baseball at Indiana University, but never played for Indiana due to him being drafted.

== Professional career ==
=== San Diego Padres (2016–2021) ===
The San Diego Padres selected Suwinski in the 15th round, with the 444th overall pick, of the 2016 Major League Baseball draft. He chose to sign with San Diego for a bonus of $550,000 on July 7, 2016. He made his professional minor-league debut on July 13, 2016, with the rookie-level Arizona League Padres, putting up a slash of .241/.325/.287 with 10 RBI in 30 games. In 2017, Suwinski was promoted to the Single-A Fort Wayne Tin Caps, slashing .227/.319/.349 with 9 home runs and 41 RBI in 125 games with the team. He returned to the team in 2018, playing in 111 games and posting a slash of .255/.324/.408 with 10 home runs and 57 RBI. For the 2019 season, Suwinski was promoted to play for the High-A Lake Elsinore Storm, hitting .208/.303/.351 with a career-high 12 home runs and 51 RBI. Suwinski did not play in a game in 2020 due to the cancellation of the minor league season due to the COVID-19 pandemic. He began the 2021 season with the Double-A San Antonio Missions and played until July 24, 2021, finishing his season with Missions batting .262/.383/.485 with 15 home runs and 37 RBI in 66 games.

=== Pittsburgh Pirates (2021–2025) ===
On July 26, 2021, the Padres traded Suwinski, Tucupita Marcano, and Michell Miliano to the Pittsburgh Pirates in exchange for Adam Frazier and $1.4 million in cash. Suwinski debuted with the Double-A Altoona Curve on July 28, 2021, with him finishing his season with the Curve batting .252/.359/.391 with four home runs and 21 RBI in 45 games. Following the season, on November 19, 2021, the Pirates added Suwinski to their 40-man roster to protect him from the Rule 5 draft.

Suwinski began his 2022 season still with the Double-A Altoona Curve on April 8, 2022, posting an impressive slash of .353/.421/.686 with 3 home runs and 13 RBI in 13 games. On April 26, Suwinski was promoted to the major leagues for the first time after Bryan Reynolds and Cole Tucker were placed on the COVID-19 injured list. He made his MLB debut that day as the starting right fielder against the Milwaukee Brewers, notching a two-out single for his first big league hit. Suwinski hit his first home run while facing the Los Angeles Dodgers on May 9. On June 4, he connected on a walk-off home run against the Arizona Diamondbacks. Suwinski hit three home runs during his first career multi-homer game on June 19 against the San Francisco Giants, being the first Pirates rookie to hit three home runs in a game since Andrew McCutchen in 2009, and also the second Pirates rookie to hit two walk-off home runs in one season, with Wally Westlake being the first in 1947. The last home run of the game ensured a walk-off victory for the Pirates against the Giants. It was the first time in Major League Baseball history that a rookie had a three home run game that included a walk-off home run. Performing below average with a slash of .198/.288/.428 with 14 home runs and 25 RBI in 72 games, Suwinski entered a slump with no hits over 29 at-bats and was demoted to the Triple-A Indianapolis Indians on July 15. Suwinski played with the Indians until August 27, putting up a slash of .214/.285/.410 with six home runs and 18 RBI in 31 games. Suwinski was recalled on August 29. Suwinski ended the season with a slash of .202/.298/.411 with 19 home runs and 38 RBI in 106 games.

Suwinski began the 2023 season on the Pirates' Opening Day roster as their center fielder. On April 29, 2023, Suwinski hit his first career grand slam off of Hobie Harris of the Washington Nationals, leading the Pirates to a 16–1 win in game two of the doubleheader. On May 29, he became the second player ever to hit two home runs into McCovey Cove at Oracle Park in the same game, with the first being Barry Bonds who did it twice in 2000 and 2002. He is also the first ever visiting player to perform the feat. The Pirates ended up losing the game 4–14. Suwinski ended the season with a breakout month in September, batting .297/.413/.656 with six home runs and 18 RBI in 21 games for the month to end off the season with a slash of .224/.339/.454 with 26 home runs and 74 RBI, a career-best as of 2023.

Suwinski played in 88 contests for Pittsburgh during the 2024 campaign, batting .182/.264/.324 with nine home runs, 26 RBI, and nine stolen bases. He made 59 appearances for the Pirates in 2025, slashing .147/.281/.253 with three home runs, 10 RBI, and seven stolen bases.

Suwinski was designated for assignment by the Pirates on February 16, 2026.

=== Los Angeles Dodgers (2026) ===
On February 21, 2026, Suwinski was claimed off waivers by the Los Angeles Dodgers. On March 2, he was removed from the 40-man roster and sent outright to the Triple-A Oklahoma City Comets. Suwinski made 93 appearances for the Comets, batting .291/.386/.562 with 21 home runs and 72 RBI.

=== Tampa Bay Rays ===
On August 3, 2026, Suwinski (and international bonus pool money) was traded to the Tampa Bay Rays in exchange for Hunter Feduccia and Jacob Kmatz. He made 37 appearances for the Triple–A Durham Bulls, batting .231/.296/.300 with one home run, 14 RBI, and six stolen bases. On November 2, the Rays added Suwinski to their 40–man roster.

== Playing style ==
Suwinski is a power hitter, generating many home runs while having a below-average batting average, especially against lefties. Of his hitting, Suwinski has said, "when I'm feeling good and able to see the ball and be quiet in the box and do what I’m trying to do, I think I’m able to do less and execute a little bit better." Suwinski in the field is defensively solid, ranking top-10 defensively for left-fielders in 2022. He describes center field as his best position as he has the "room to run".

== Personal life ==
Suwinski is a devout Christian who frequently refers to his faith on social media.
