= James DeLeo =

American politician

Member of the Illinois Senate from the 10th district
- In office January 13, 1993 – August 2010
- Preceded by: Philip Rock
- Succeeded by: John Mulroe

Personal details
- Born: August 10, 1951 (age 74) Chicago, Illinois, U.S.
- Party: Democratic
- Spouse: Ann DeLeo

James A. DeLeo (born August 10, 1951) is a former Democratic member of the Illinois Senate, representing the 10th district since 1992, and is an Assistant Majority Leader. Earlier he served in the Illinois House of Representatives. He announced his retirement from the State Senate in 2010, and left office in August 2010. Democrat John G. Mulroe was appointed to replace him and defeated Republican Brian Doherty for a full term in office in the 2010 general election.

== Education ==
DeLeo was educated in the Chicago Public Schools; he later attended Chicago's Loop Junior College (now Harold Washington College) and DePaul University where he majored in political science.

== State representative ==
Before becoming a state senator, DeLeo served in the Illinois House of Representatives. While serving as a state representative, DeLeo was indicted in 1989 by a federal grand jury as part of the Operation Greylord investigation. He was accused of not paying taxes on bribes he allegedly received while working as a top aide to Cook County’s chief traffic court judge. The jury was unable to reach a verdict, leading DeLeo to plead guilty to a misdemeanor in a plea deal that allowed him to keep his legislative position.

== Senate career ==
DeLeo sponsored legislation to increase funding for diabetes research by giving individual taxpayers the opportunity to designate contributions on their income tax returns. He also sponsored resolution SJR0061 of the 95th General Assembly honoring the life the late Rosemont, Illinois Mayor, Donald E. Stephens. In the Senate DeLeo served as Vice-Chairman of the Senate Committee on Executive Appointments, and was a member of the Senate Executive Committee and the Senate Local Government Committee.

DeLeo chose to leave office in August 2010 and Democratic candidate John G. Mulroe was appointed to complete the remainder of his term. Mulroe ran for and won a full term in 2010 general election.

== Personal life ==
DeLeo co-owns a bar in Chicago, the Tavern on Rush, with Illinois Senate President John Cullerton (D-Chicago) and others.
