= Sisters of the Resurrection =

Congregation of the Sisters of the Resurrection
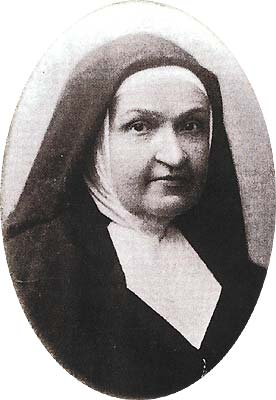
- Celina Borzecka
- Formation: 1891 (135 years ago) in Rome, Italy
- Founder: Celine Borzecka and Hedwig Borzecka
- Type: Catholic religious order

The Congregation of the Sisters of the Resurrection was founded in Rome, Italy, in 1891 by a widow, Celine Borzecka, and her daughter, Hedwig Borzecka. This was the first time in the history of the Roman Catholic Church that a religious institute of women was founded jointly by a mother and daughter.

== History ==
Borzecka had been married about sixteen years when her husband died. She traveled to Rome with her daughters, in the hope of broadening their education. There she met Piotr Semenenko of the Congregation of the Resurrection. With his assistance Celine and Hedwig began the Congregation of the Sisters of the Resurrection on 6 January 1891.

=== Immaculate Conception Province, Chicago ===
In 1900, the Resurrectionist Fathers invited Borzecka to send some sisters to America. Four Sisters opened a parish school at St. Mary of the Angels in Chicago. Five years later they established a novitiate. In 1912, they opened Resurrection Academy, an elementary and boarding school for girls. In 1915, the novitiate was moved to Norwood Park, and two years later the sisters opened a day care center in the old building for children of working mothers. Resurrection High School opened in 1922.

The Province of the Immaculate Conception was established in 1928. The congregation expanded into healthcare in 1953 with the founding of Resurrection Hospital, which became Resurrection Health Care.

=== New York Province ===
In September 1926 the sisters opened a nursery for pre-school children in Amsterdam, New York near the carpet mills, which soon expanded to a children's home. In 1933 Ignacy Jan Paderewski played a concert to raise funds towards paying off the building. The Resurrection Children's Home closed in 1960. The sisters also staffed Mount Loretto Nursing Home. Maria Regina High School opened in Hartsdale, New York in 1959.

Earlier, the sisters were invited to teach at St. Mary of Czestochowa School in Schenectady, New York. Six sisters arrived in 1907. The order continued to teach in the school until it closed in 1979. Several sisters remained in service of St. Mary's Parish for many years thereafter.

The sisters were invited to the Diocese of Trenton in 1965, where they opened St. Veronica's School in Howell.

== Present day ==
The Congregation is active in seven countries; the Generalate is in Rome.

== See also ==
- 1891 in Italy
- Catholic Church and women
