= Charles Borzecki =

French flying ace

Charles Alexandre Bronislas Borzecki
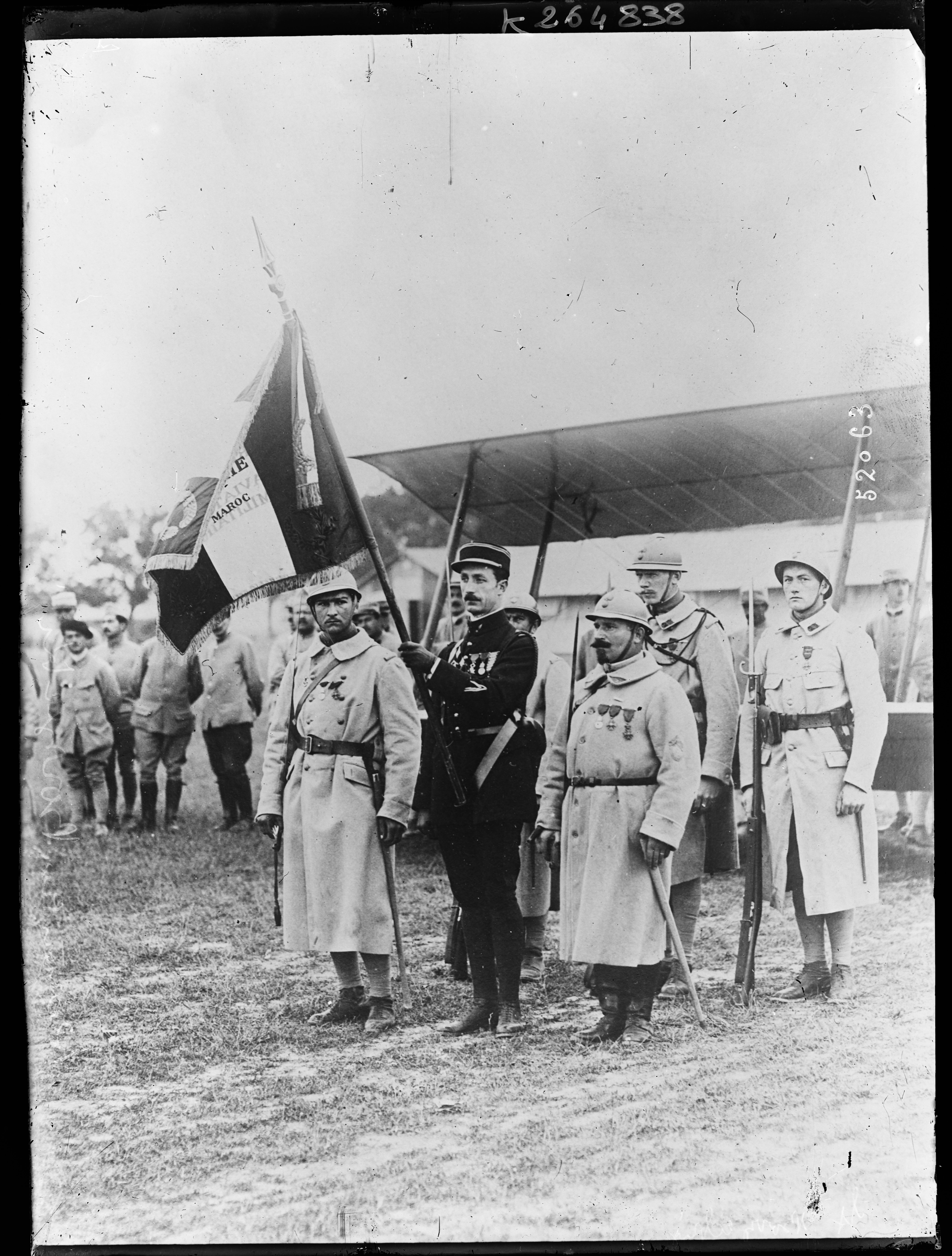
- Born: 4 November 1880; Paris. France
- Died: 30 May 1959 (aged 78)
- Military career
- Allegiance: France
- Branch: Flying services
- Service years: 1914–1918
- Rank: Lieutenant
- Unit: C43, Spa62
- Awards: Légion d'honneur, Médaille militaire, Croix de Guerre

Lieutenant Charles Alexandre Bronislas Borzecki (1880–1959) was a World War I flying ace credited with five aerial victories.

== Military service ==
Having previously served his mandatory military obligation in army artillery (from 1901 to 1903), Borzecki was recalled from the reserves on 2 August 1914 to serve in World War I. He applied for transfer to aviation service. By 3 November 1914, he was considered trained and was assigned to Escadrille C43. He remained with this squadron until well into 1916, and scored his first confirmed victory on 25 July of that year. After a transfer to Escadrille N62, he scored four shared victories over enemy airplanes between 10 October 1916 and 25 February 1917.

He returned to service in 1942 as a pilot.

== Honors and awards ==
Médaille militaire citation, 4 August 1916:

Adjudant observer of Escadrille C43, a photographer observer who showed skill, courage, and sang-froid. He distinguished himself during the period 1 to 10 July 1916, when he demonstrated qualities of spirit and courage. In extremely bad weather, he executed all the missions assigned to him, often at very low altitudes, in spite of heavy fire from infantry and artillery. Attacked twice by enemy planes on 1 and 3 July, he counterattacked them, causing them to flee, then completed his mission. He was wounded and cited in orders.

Légion d'honneur citation, 8 March 1917:

Sous Lieutenant observer of Escadrille N62; observer of the first order. On 10 February 1917, during the course of a long range mission, he was attacked by three enemy planes; he downed one of them and put the others to flight, not returning until his mission was completed. Has downed four enemy planes since July 1916. Already wounded in the course of the war and cited in orders four times.

Borzecki was sworn into the Légion d'honneur as a Chevalier but would rise during his lifetime to become a Grand Officier.
