= Resurrection College Prep =

Resurrection College Prep High School

Location
- 7500 West Talcott Avenue; Chicago, Illinois 60631; United States; 41°59′27″N 87°48′56″W

Information
- Type: private
- Motto: Charity and Truth
- Denomination: Roman Catholic (Christian Brothers)
- Established: 1922
- Oversight: Archdiocese of Chicago
- President: Dr. Richard Piwowarski
- Principal: Dr. Patricia Caine
- Grades: 9–12
- Gender: all-female
- Campus type: urban
- Colors: Red and White
- Song: Dear Resurrection
- Athletics conference: Girls Catholic Athletic Conference/IHSA
- Mascot: Bandit (raccoon)
- Accreditation: North Central Association of Colleges and Schools
- Newspaper: The Res Banner (TRB)
- Tuition: $15, 700
- Affiliation: Sisters of the Resurrection
- Alumni: 15,000+
- Website: www.reshs.org

Resurrection College Prep High School is a private, Catholic, all-girls high school in Chicago, Illinois. It is located in the Roman Catholic Archdiocese of Chicago.

== History ==
Resurrection High School was founded by the Sisters of the Resurrection, a Catholic religious order. Sister Anne Strzelecka C.R. arrived in Chicago on February 2, 1900, to work with students in Catholic schools. In 1912, Sister Anne bought a tract of land in northwest Chicago and three years later opened Resurrection Academy as an elementary school and boarding school for girls. In 1920, Sister Anne bought the 52-acre (210,000 m^{2}) Anderson onion farm and skating pond where Resurrection Medical Center now stands. Resurrection High School was established in 1922. In 1922, she opened the doors to Resurrection High School in what is now the Provincial Home. Four years later, the first graduating class consisted of four young women, one of whom went on to become a successful attorney as well as a mother and grandmother of future Resites. After 40 years of growth, Resurrection High School opened its doors in 1962 in a new, much larger building. In 1997, an $11 million construction program added two state of the art science and computer labs, a technology center with internet capabilities, a 36-station fitness center, as well as air conditioning throughout the facility. Resurrection High School counts more than 12,000 alumnae in 83 graduating classes.

The school closed temporarily on Tuesday, March 10, 2020, after officials learned that a person at the school had been exposed to the COVID-19 virus.
