= Edward T. Scholl =

American politician

Edward T. Scholl (May 18, 1937 – August 29, 2003) was an American politician, journalist, and writer. Scholl was born in Chicago. He went to the Taft High School in Chicago and to the Wright Junior College. Scholl also went to the Loyola University Chicago. Scholl wrote a history about Chicago's northwest community:Seven Miles of Ideal Living and served as editor of the Edison-Norwood Community Newspaper, Scholl served on the Chicago City Council from 1963 to 1972 and was a Republican. He then served in the Illinois Senate from 1973 to 1975. In 1975, Scholl was found guilty of accepting a bribe for accepting money from a contractor for changes with zoning in his ward. Scholl served six months in prison. Scholl collapsed and died while playing golf in Barrington, Illinois.
