= Borzecki 2RB =

Polish piston engine developed for use in motor gliders

- Type: Air-cooled four-cylinder horizontally opposed two-stroke piston engine
- National origin: Poland
- Manufacturer: Jozef Borzecki
- First run: 1972
- Major applications: Borzecki Alto-Stratus

The Borzecki 2RB is a Polish air-cooled, four-cylinder, horizontally opposed, two-stroke, piston engine designed and built by Jozef Borzecki for use in motor gliders. First bench tested in 1970 the 2RB can be used in both tractor and pusher configuration, and the 24 hp (18 kW) engine was first flown in 1972 in his own design motor glider, the Borzecki Alto-Stratus.

== Application ==
- Borzecki Alto-Stratus

== Specifications ==
Data from Jane's All the World's Aircraft 1994-95

=== General characteristics ===
- Type: Air-cooled four-cylinder horizontally opposed two-stroke piston engine
- Bore: 70 mm (2.76 in)
- Stroke: 35 mm (1.38 in)
- Displacement: 33 cu in (540 cc)
- Length: 450 mm (17.7 in)
- Width: 250 mm (9.8 in)
- Height: 260 mm (10.2 in)
- Dry weight: 15 kg (33 lb)
- Designer: Jozef Borzecki

=== Components ===
- Fuel system: Jawa 250 motor-cycle carburettor
- Fuel type: Mixture of 76-octane petrol and oil
- Cooling system: Air-cooled

=== Performance ===
- Power output: 24 hp (18 kW) at 6,000 rpm
- Compression ratio: 7.2:1

== See also ==
Related lists

- List of aircraft engines
