= Joseph A. Tunzi =

American author, publisher, and producer (born 1953)

- Born: Joseph Anthony Tunzi; July 25, 1953 (age 73); Chicago, Illinois, U.S.
- Occupations: Author, publisher, producer, researcher, archivist, historian
- Years active: 1988–present
- Notable work: Elvis Sessions III: The Recorded Music of Elvis Aron Presley 1953–1977 (2004); 68 At 40: Retrospective (2008)
- Website: jatpublishing.com

Joseph Anthony Tunzi (born July 25, 1953) is an American author, publisher, and producer, based in Chicago, Illinois.

== Career ==
Tunzi worked at several radio stations in the Chicago area between 1972 and 1982 as an account executive in charge of selling radio advertisements. Tunzi's early work in radio meant that he was constantly attending learning seminars which gave him the equivalent of a college degree. He also owned Records for a Song, a Chicago area record shop in the late seventies. By 1985, Tunzi had stopped working for radio stations and began focusing on becoming an entrepreneur in direct mail advertising. In 1982, he formed his own publishing company, which up until 1987 strictly dealt with direct mail advertising.

He has been described as "one of the foremost authorities on Elvis Presley," authoring, self-publishing, and producing over 60 titles about Presley, among others, for over three decades. Tunzi's other projects focus on topics including Frank Sinatra, The Beatles, Muhammad Ali, Martin Luther King Jr., the Assassination of John F. Kennedy, and the Vietnam War.

Tunzi has compiled a massive photo archive, from which he licenses photographs of Presley. He is credited as an Elvis Presley Archivist Extraordinaire in the August 2023 Paramount+ streaming feature-length documentary Reinventing Elvis: The '68 Comeback.

Adam Victor referred to Tunzi in his 2008 publication The Elvis Encyclopedia as "one of the world's most prolific Elvis authors, with more than twenty books to his name, specializing in photo books about specific events and tours through his own publishing operation, J.A.T. Productions." Victor added that "many of Tunzi's books feature exclusive interviews and recordings... he has also published a number of DVD titles, including the Elvis Presley Hot Shots and Cool Clips series."

=== As an author ===
The company's first self-published title, The First Elvis Video Price and Reference Guide, was a parody of the price guides emerging in the collectibles market at the time. According to Mike Eder in his article "A Look at Joseph A. Tunzi" in AMICI Journal (National Italian American Celebrity Magazine), Tunzi believed many of the listed values were arbitrary and was amused by the proliferation of such publications, prompting him to create a parody guide focused on Presley's videos. Eder noted that Tunzi incorporated subtle humor to test his theory that price guides were being given undue importance in collectors’ circles. In 1999, Steven Opdyke wrote that the guide represented another milestone in Tunzi's career, as it was the first Elvis Presley video guide, containing listings of movie prints, promotional tapes, and foreign releases, along with pricing information considered valuable for acquiring items with limited distribution.

=== Photo journals ===
Beginning with Elvis, Encore Performance (Chicago 1972), Tunzi has written and self-published numerous photo journals on Presley. As Opdyke elaborated in his book The Printed Elvis: The Complete Guide To Books About The King, "one can only say that Joseph Tunzi (like Presley biographer Bill E. Burk) has done a ton of work on Presley. Each book (all from a nineties perspective) has been limited to a specific time period in Presley's career, concentrating on the music and performances. Taken together, they formed one of the most in-depth chronicles of the King's career from the late sixties forward."

In 2003, Tunzi's JAT Publishing published Russ Howe and Tom Salva's book of photographs of Presley performing at Nassau Coliseum on June 22–23, 1973. In 2015, Tunzi was nominated for the first time and elected to the William Howard Taft High School Hall of Fame. Tunzi was a 1971 graduate of Taft High School. This induction was covered in a Chicago-area newspaper.

== Elvis Sessions ==
In 1993, Tunzi self-published the first edition in a series of books titled Elvis Sessions: The Recorded Music of Elvis Aron Presley 1953–1977 based on Presley's recording sessions and live recordings. Two further volumes followed in 1996 and 2004. These books have documented the musicians and backup vocalists who performed with Presley as well as some unreleased recordings. Booklist wrote of Tunzi's first Elvis Sessions book:

Elvis Sessions encompasses Presley's musical career from his first commercial sides for Sun Records in 1954 through his final concert recordings in June 1977, two months before his death. This terrain is traversed in Reconsider Baby: The Definitive Elvis Sessionography (rev. ed. 1986) but Tunzi also includes material that surfaced recently.

American Libraries wrote of the same book:

The genuine musical genius of Elvis Presley, has, to a large degree, been obscured by the tragic excesses of his last years and the seemingly inexhaustible supply of tabloid drivel about him. Elvis Sessions: The Recorded Music of Elvis Aron Presley 1953–1977 eschews such nonsense and sticks with the facts about Elvis' recording career, resulting in a solid bit of American pop music history.

== CD and DVD releases ==
Over the years, JAT Publishing has expanded to produce several compact disc and DVD titles. Tunzi has also written and published three projects featuring The Beatles. These projects include a book titled Beatles '65 which featured the only four known candid color paparazzi photographs taken of Presley and the members of the Beatles on August 27, 1965. Ken Sharp wrote a column in Friday Morning Quarterback of Tunzi's Beatles '65, saying that "the 96-page book draws together exciting and dramatic photographs of the Beatles in concert and at press conferences. Photographs of fans at shows, experiencing the complete electrical shock of 'Beatlemania' is also included." Included with this project was Elvis Sings Beatles Songs, the first officially sanctioned compact disc release to feature all of Presley's cover recordings of Beatles songs. Derek Page reviewed Beatles '65 in Beatlefan, writing that it was "all in all, a marvelous look at The Beatles in their touring prime."

In 1999, Eclipse Music Group released the first Presley-shaped compact disc, titled Elvis Presley Limited Edition Shaped CD. Tunzi provided the liner notes for this release.

Tunzi produced a DVD starring Presley and Frank Sinatra in 2000, titled Welcome Home Elvis, and in 2001 started a series of DVD videos titled Hot Shots & Cool Clips, which is presently at eight volumes. The Welcome Home Elvis release was one of the first independent Elvis Presley video releases on the DVD format. The Hot Shots & Cool Clips series has featured newsreel, press conference, concert, and candid footage of Presley throughout his career. The website elvisondvdcd.de noted that the third volume in the series contained some of the rarest archival footage of Presley that had been released.

Photographs from Tunzi's archives have appeared in numerous compact disc and vinyl reissues of Presley's music beginning with the 1994 compact disc reissues of Elvis and Raised on Rock. Other notable domestic releases to feature his photographs include Walk a Mile in My Shoes: The Essential '70s Masters, An Afternoon in the Garden, Platinum: A Life in Music, Today, Tomorrow, and Forever, The Complete Elvis Presley Masters, and the 2016 sixty compact disc boxed set, The RCA Albums Collection.

In August 2002, Tunzi was one of the first to properly document and correct the erroneous photo credits attributed to the cover of Presley's first self-titled RCA Records vinyl album. The album, Elvis Presley, originally credited the photographs used to photographer William Popsie Randolph. However, this credit line actually only applied to the photographs used on the back cover. The series of four photos found on the back cover were taken in New York at RCA on December 1, 1955. The front cover, an iconic picture of Presley performing in concert at the Fort Homer W. Hesterly Armory in Tampa, Florida, on July 31, 1955, was actually photographed by William V. "Red" Robertson of Robertson & Fresch.
