= Norwood Park Historic District (Asheville, North Carolina) =

Historic district in North Carolina, United States

- U.S. National Register of Historic Places
- U.S. Historic district
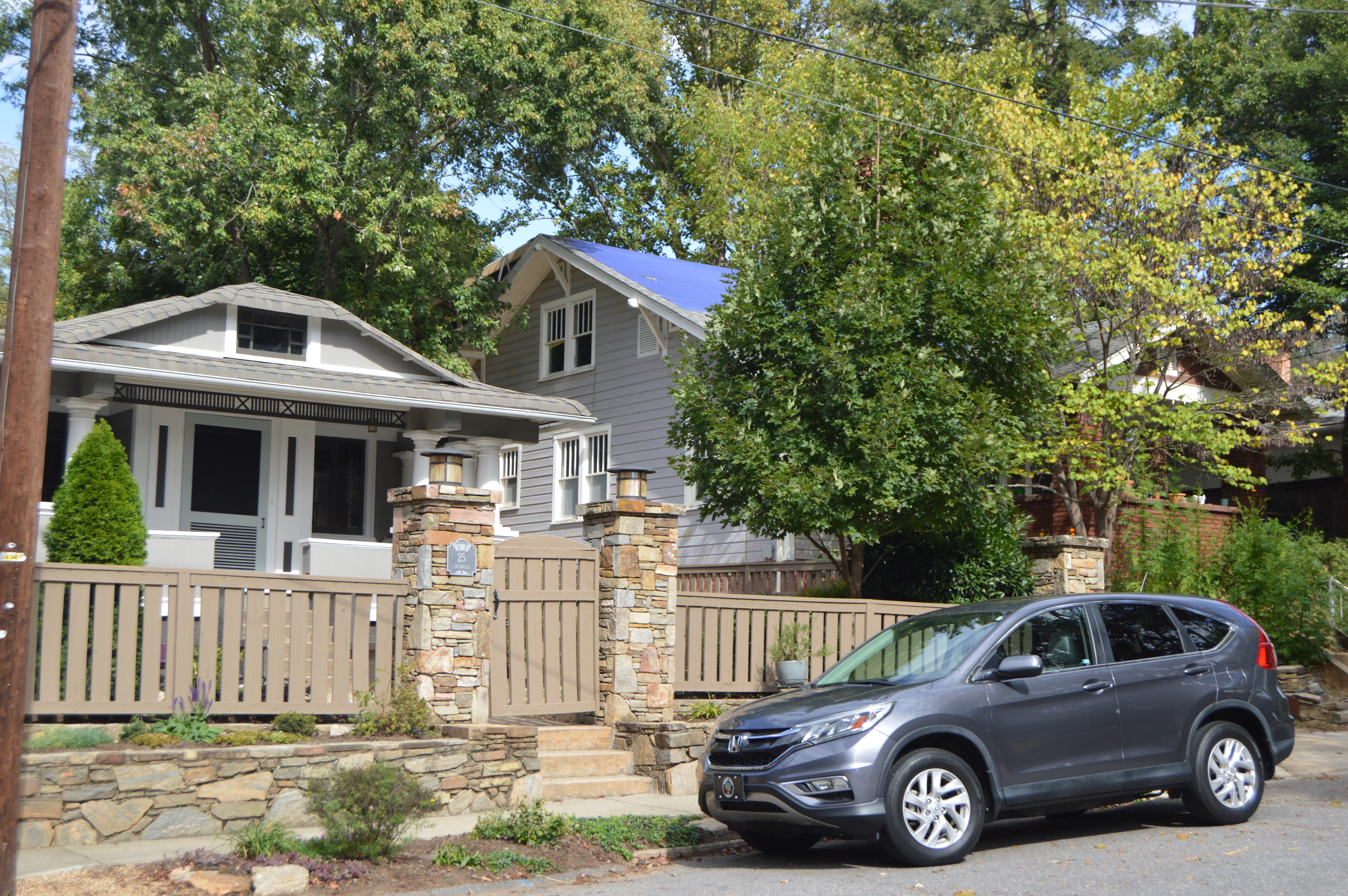
- Norwood Avenue at Ramoth

- Location within North Carolina Location within the United States
- Location: District is bounded roughly on the W. and S. by Murdock St.; on the N. by Woodward Ave; on the E. by Norwood Ave., Asheville, North Carolina
- Coordinates: 35°36′56″N 82°33′09″W
- Area: 26 acres (11 ha)
- Built: 1914
- Architectural style: Bungalow/craftsman, Colonial Revival
- NRHP reference No.: 08000815
- Added to NRHP: August 29, 2008

Norwood Park Historic District is a national historic district of Asheville, North Carolina. The district encompasses 154 contributing buildings and one contributing structure in a predominantly residential section of Asheville. The district was largely developed in the first three decades of the 20th century, and includes representative examples of Colonial Revival and Bungalow-style dwellings.

It was listed on the National Register of Historic Places in 2008.

== Gallery ==
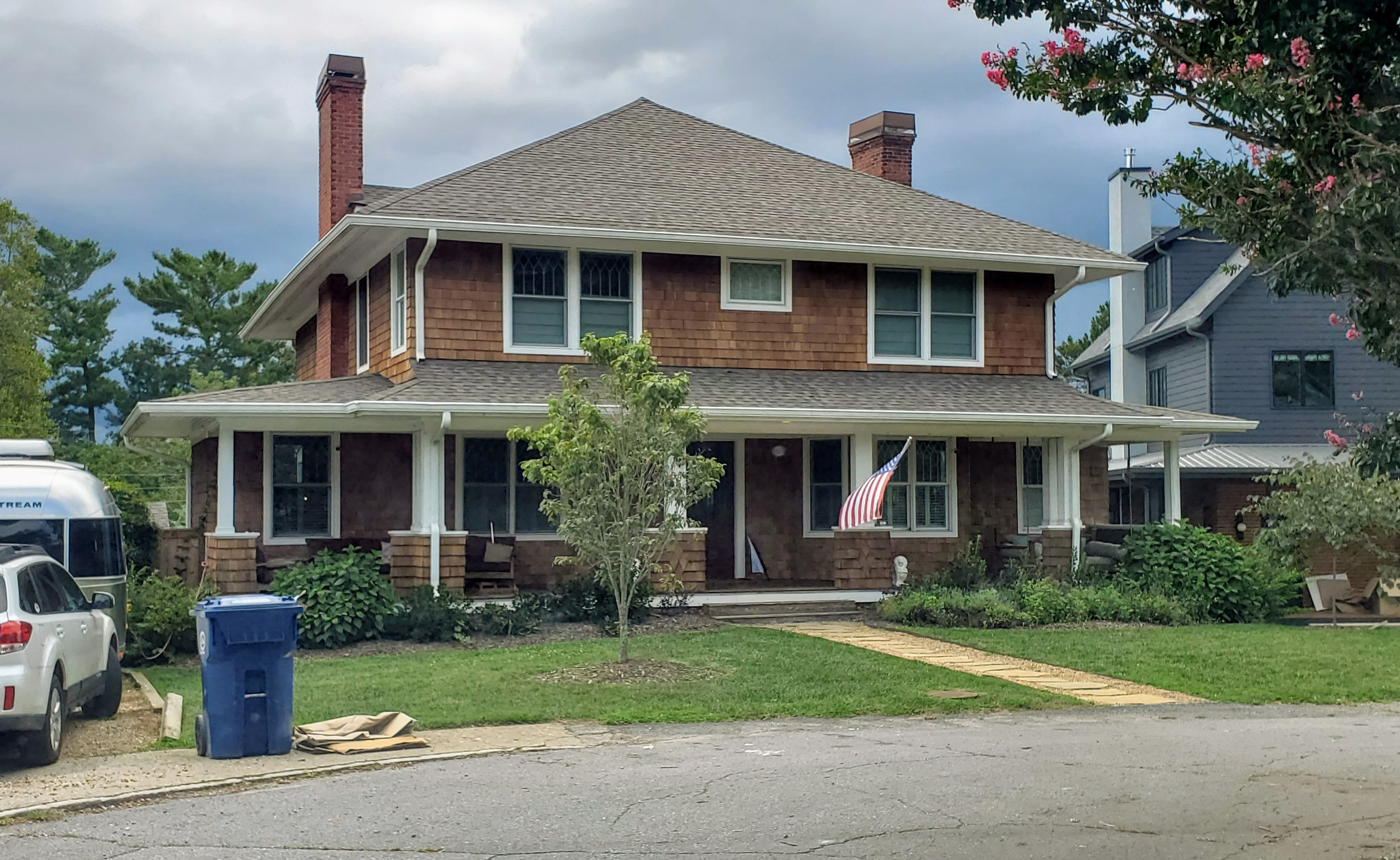
39 Ramoth Road, 2021

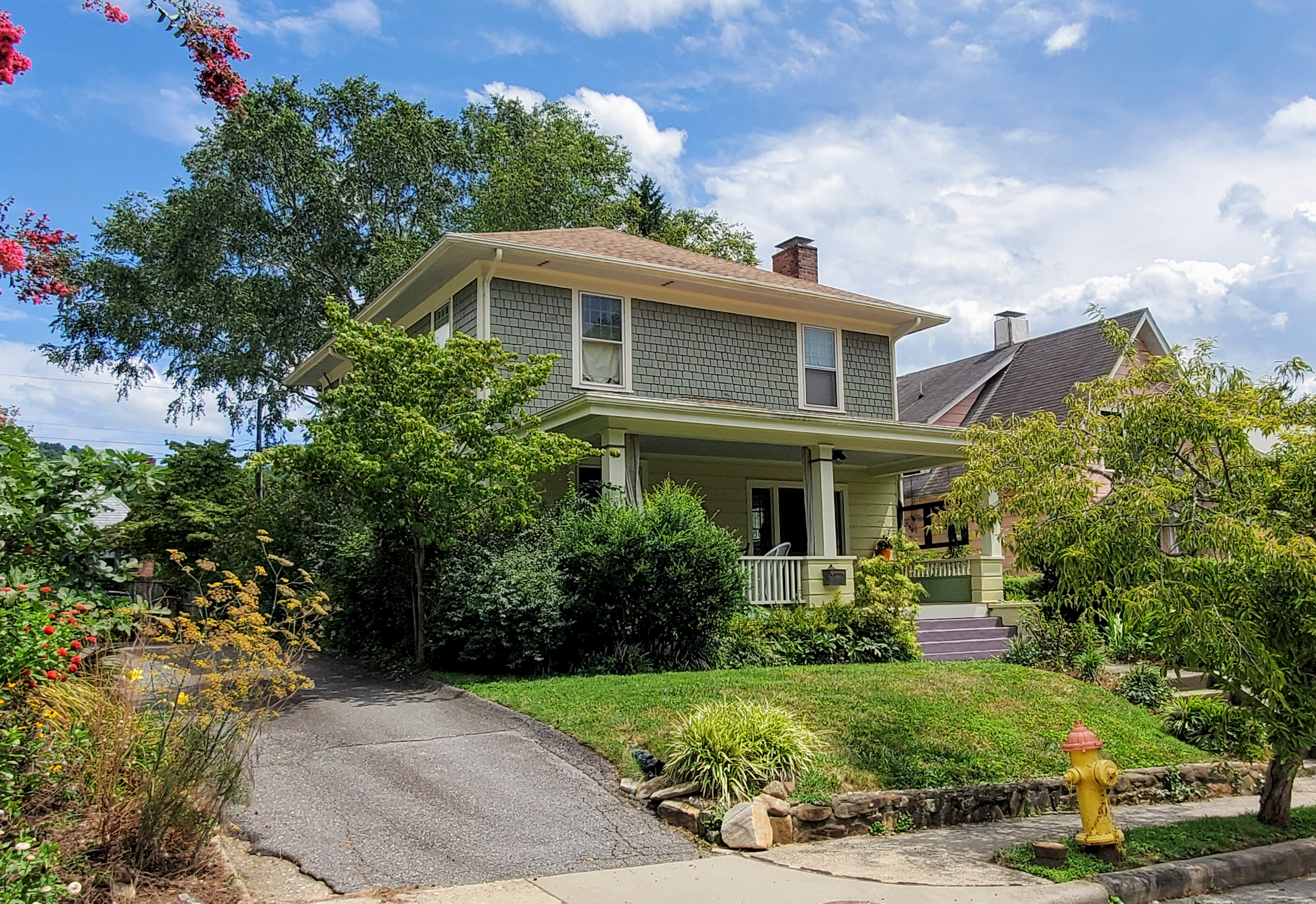
112 Norwood Ave., 2021

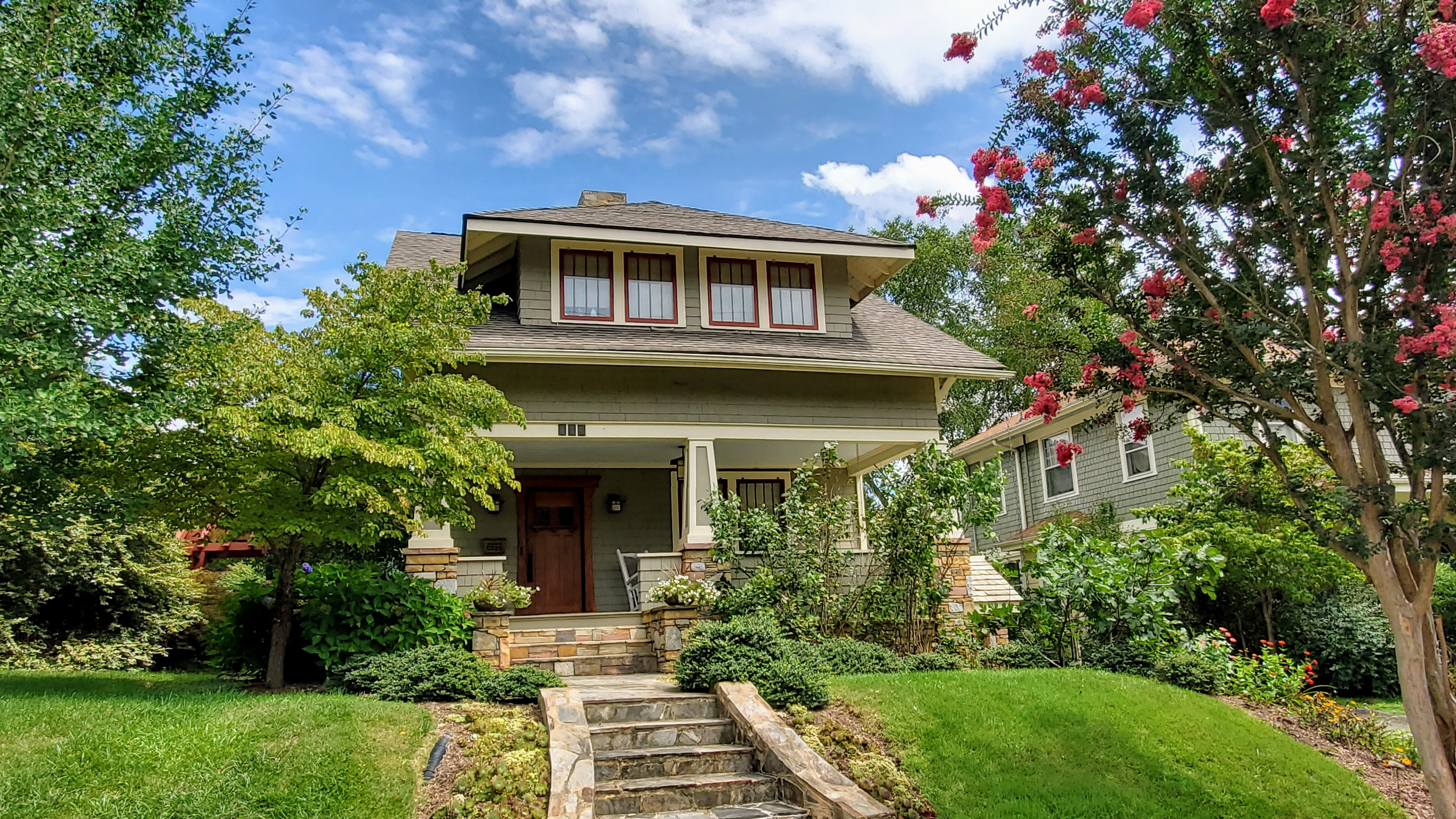
O. T. Wenige House, 115 Norwood Avenue, 2021

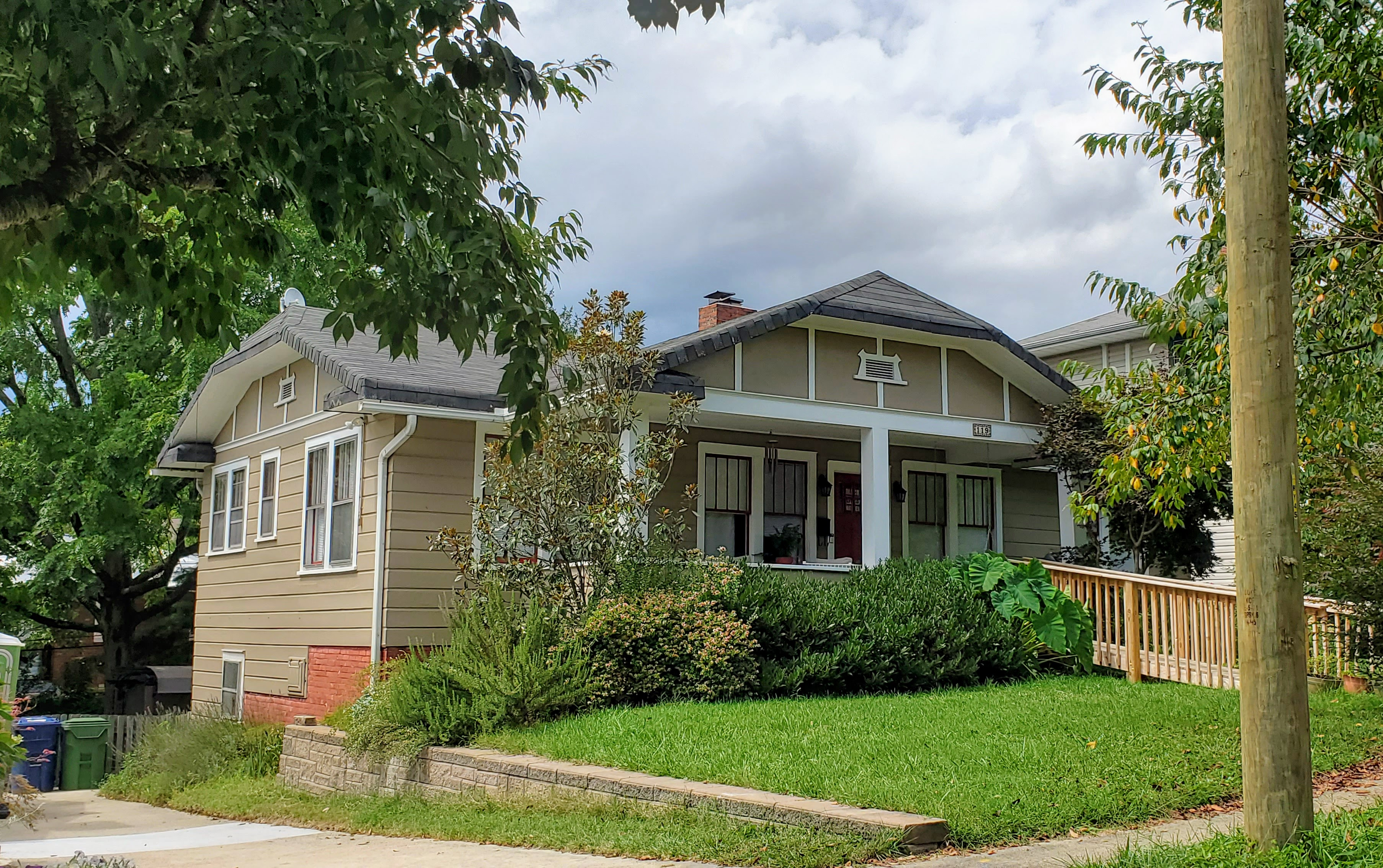
119 Norwood Ave., 2021

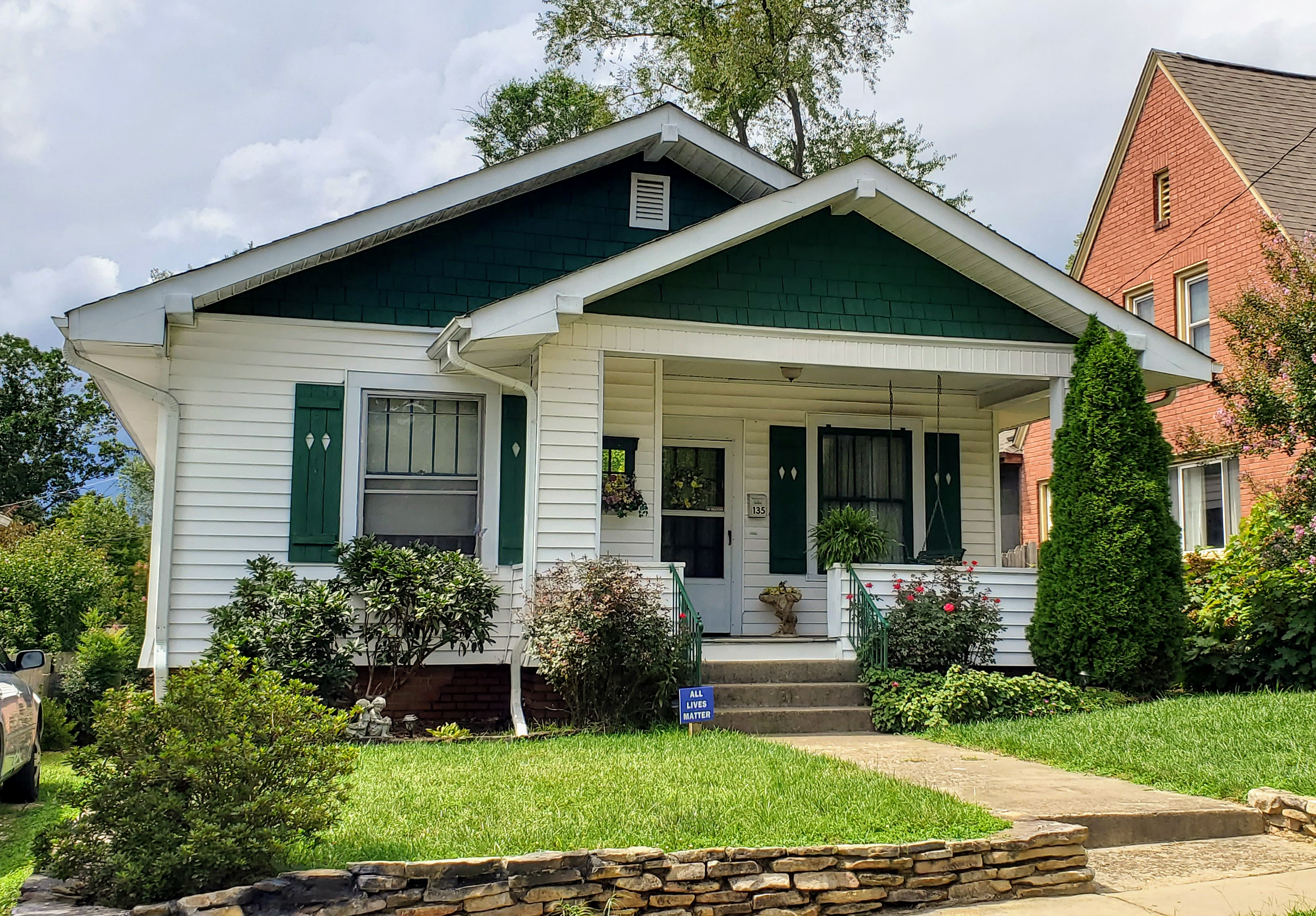
135 Norwood Ave., 2021

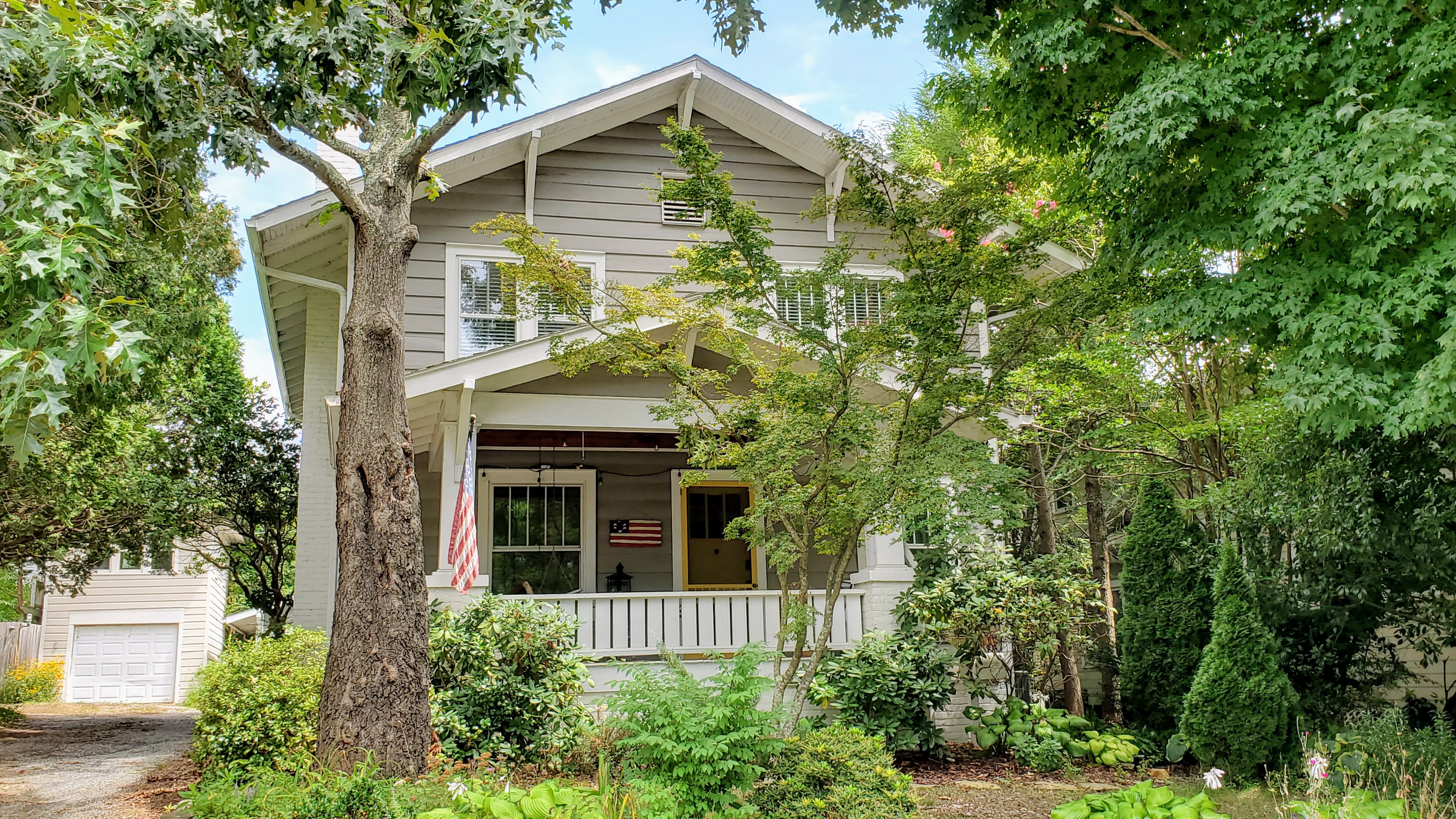
Earl H. Frothingham House, 2021

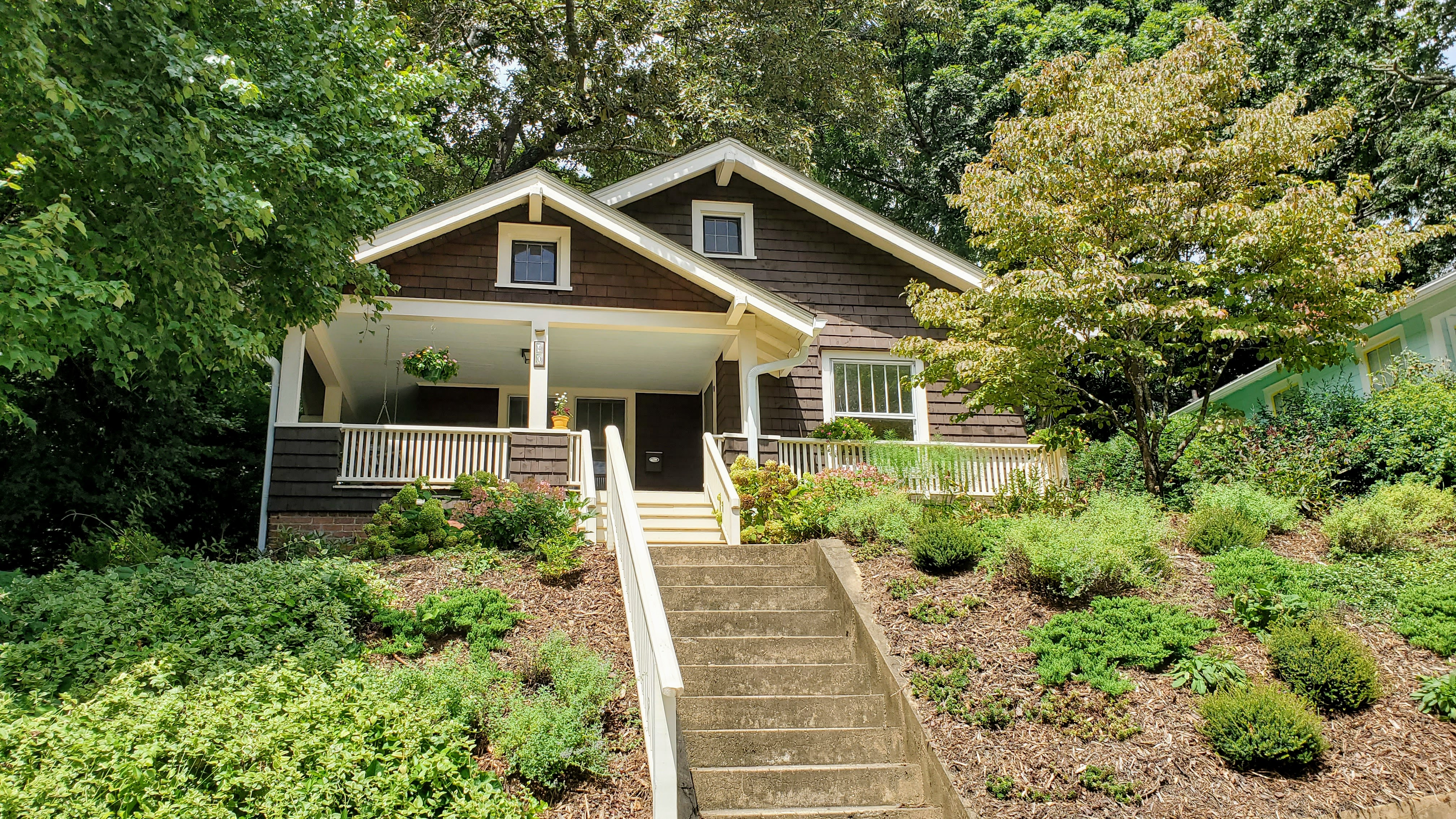
F. M. Rogers House, 2021

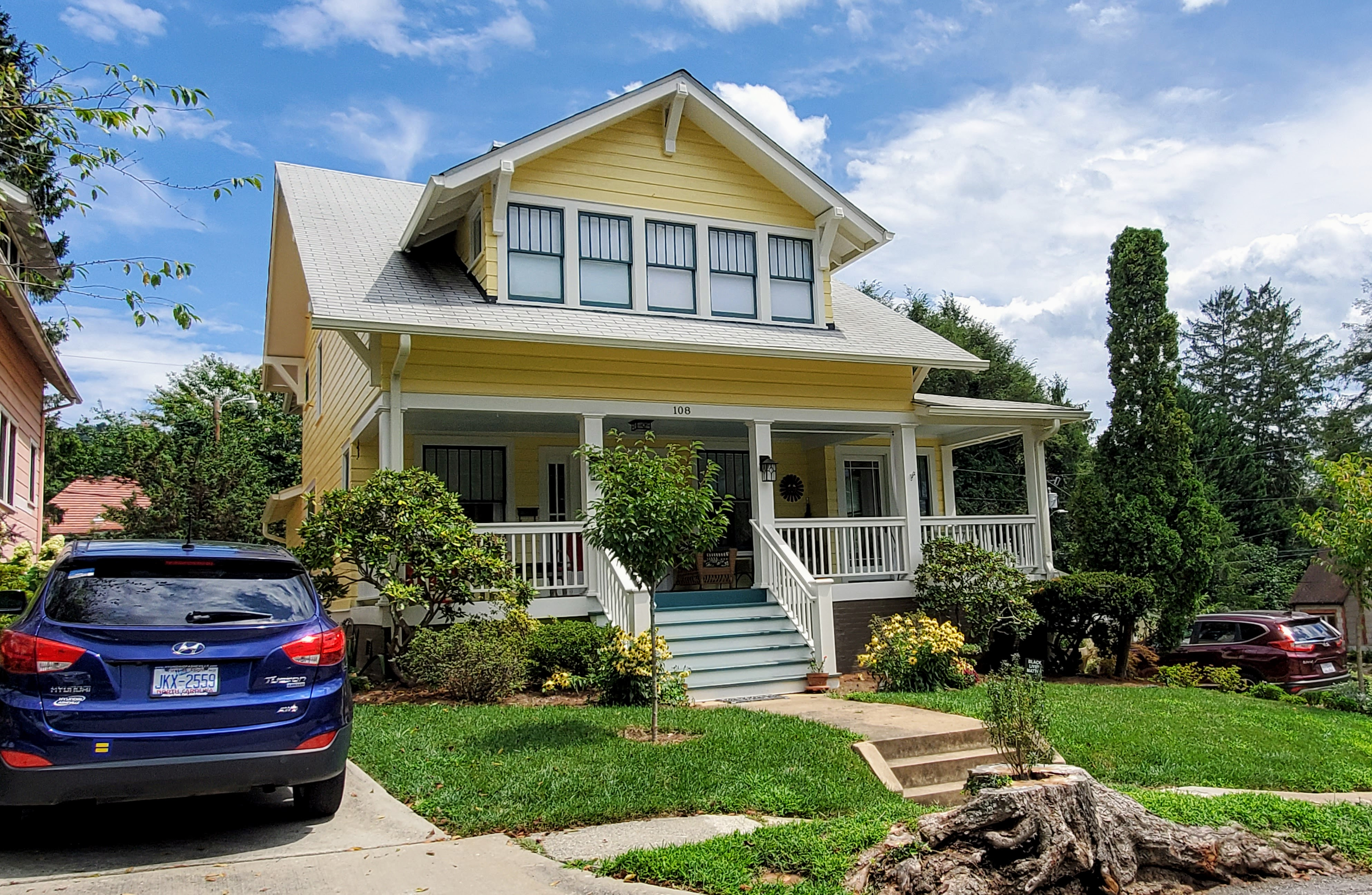
H. L. Parker House, 2021

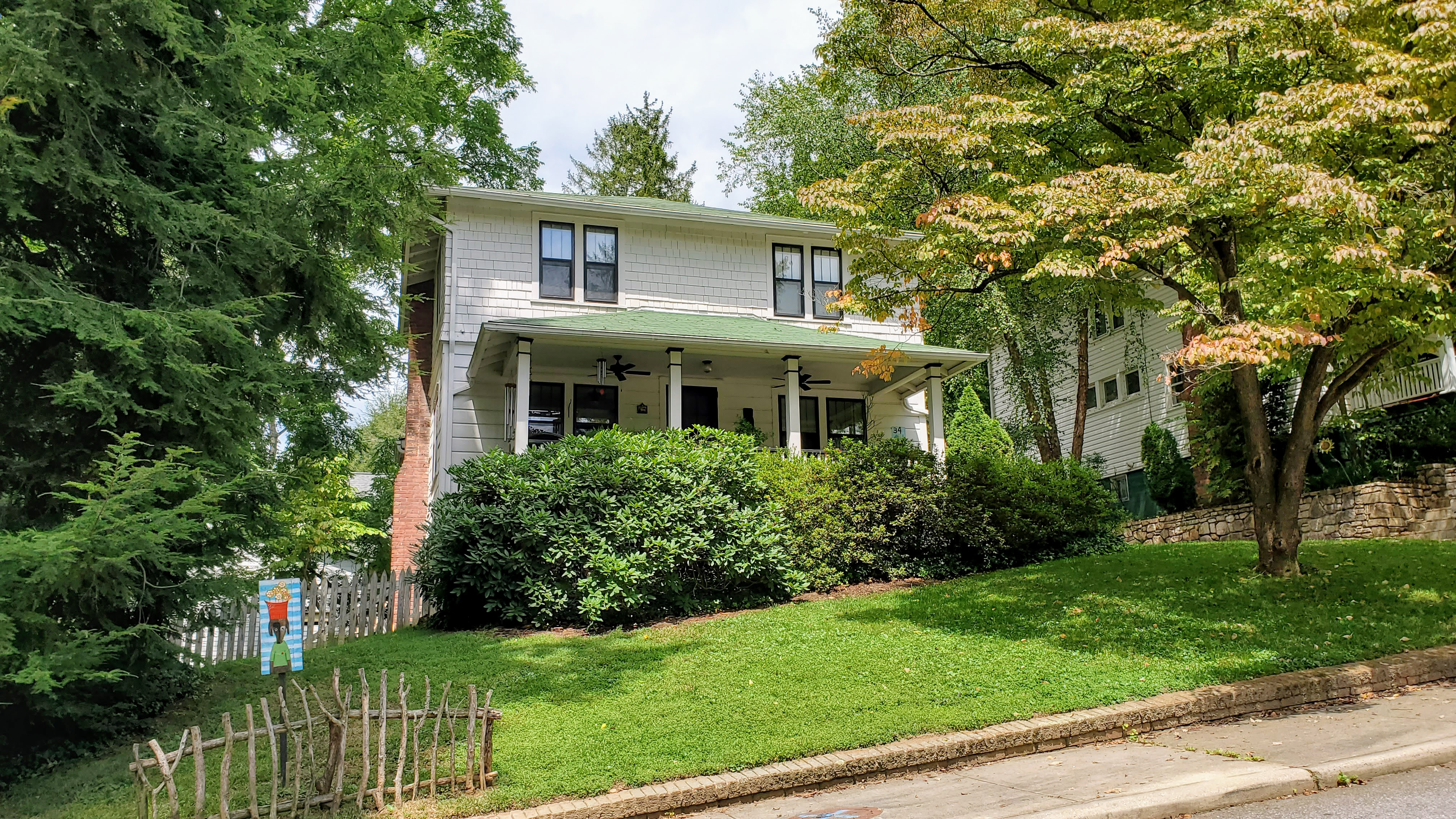
R. L. Spaulding House, 2021

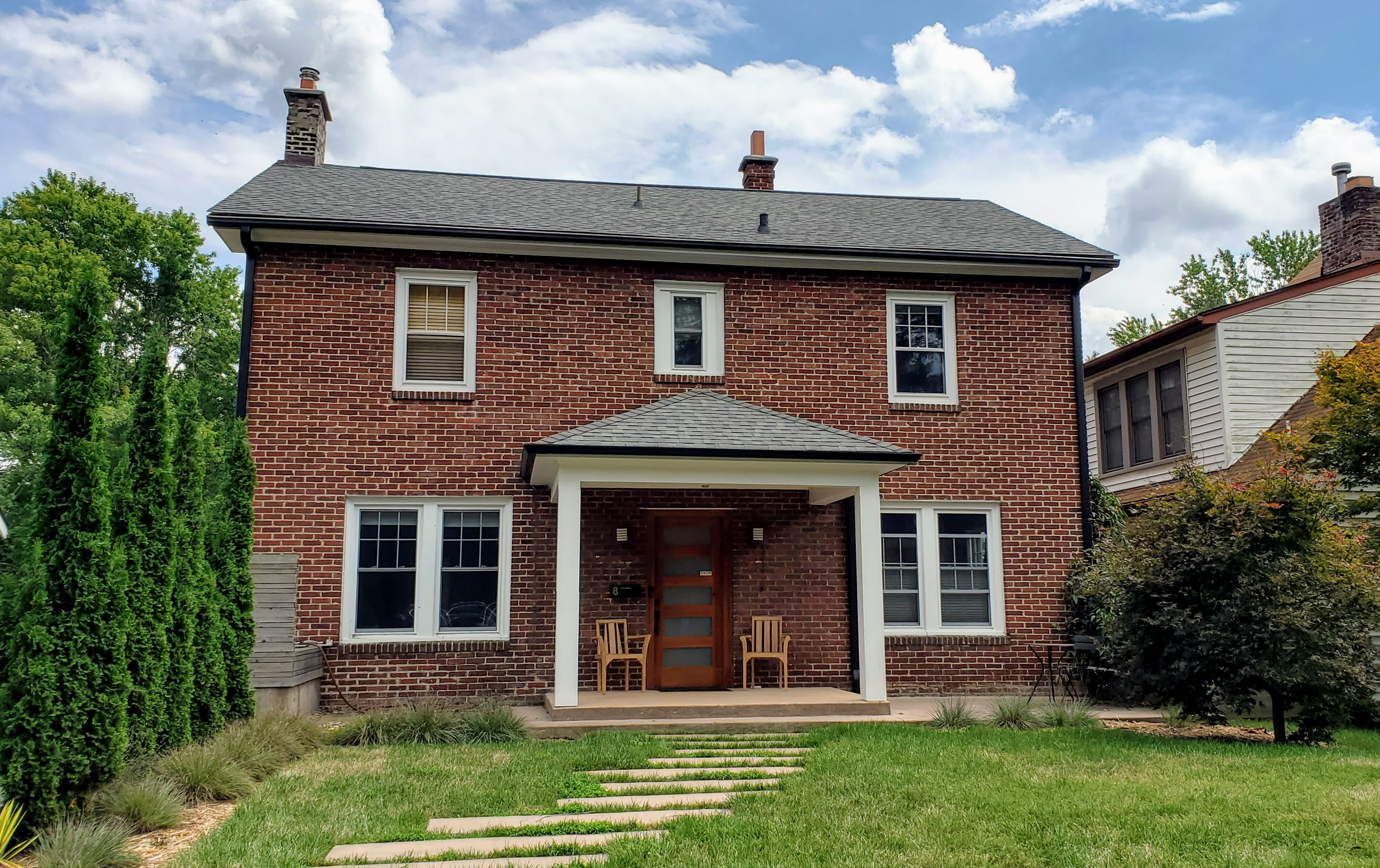
Sarah Minick House, 2021
