= William Howard Taft High School (Chicago) =

Chicago high school

Taft High School

Location
- 6530 W. Bryn Mawr Avenue; Chicago, Illinois 60631; United States; 41.9844°N 87.79192°W

Information
- Type: Public Secondary
- Motto: "Teaching Academics For Tomorrow."
- Opened: 1939
- School district: Chicago Public Schools
- Principal: Ryan Glowacz
- Teaching staff: 269.00 (FTE)
- Grades: 7–12
- Gender: Coed
- Enrollment: 4,464 (2022-23)
- Student to teacher ratio: 16.59
- Campus type: Urban
- Colors: Blue & silver
- Song: Fly Like an Eagle
- Athletics conference: Chicago Public League
- Mascot: Eagles
- Accreditation: North Central Association of Colleges and Schools
- Yearbook: Aerie
- Website: tafthighschool.org

Taft High School is a public four-year high school located in the Norwood Park neighborhood on the northwest side of Chicago, Illinois, United States. Taft serves communities on the far northwest side, specifically Norwood Park, Edison Park, Jefferson Park, Forest Glen and O'Hare. Taft is operated by the Chicago Public Schools district. Rydell High School in Grease (musical) is based on Taft.

Taft's NJROTC unit won a Distinguished Unit award every year from 2001 to 2014. In the late 1990s—to stanch the loss of students—Chicago Public Schools made significant changes to the school to attract more neighborhood students. These included an NJROTC unit, a selective-enrollment academic center for 7th and 8th grade students, and an International Baccalaureate Diploma program. Taft's IB program became authorized in 2001, and since 2014 has been a "wall-to-wall" IB World School.

== Athletics ==
Taft competes in the Chicago Public League (CPL) and is a member of the Illinois High School Association (IHSA). The boys baseball team were Public League champions in 1968, CPS quarter-finalists in 1985, and regional champions in 2009. The girls volleyball team were Public League champions in the 1979–80 season.

In 2018, the boys varsity football team brought home its first Chicago Public League championship since 1972 with a 29–13 win over Eric Solorio Academy High School.

The wrestling team won four consecutive Chicago Public League Championships. (2018, 2019, 2020, and 2021)

A nine-hole putting green was installed during the summer of 2023, costing ultimately $32,000.

In 2024, the girls' flag football team was both the city and state regional champions.

In 2025, the boys' soccer team won the Chicago Public League city championship, with an undefeated regular season record, (18-0) against Lane Tech College Prep High School. They became the first boys soccer team in CPS to finish a regular season unbeaten, untied, and as city champions since Harrison High School in 1974. This was their second city championship in the past two years; they defeated Sarah Goode in 2023. Despite losing in the state playoffs to Niles West, the boys soccer team finished #4 in the state of Illinois for the 2025 season.

== Academic Center ==
The Academic Center at William Howard Taft High School is a selective enrollment program offering the International Baccalaureate Middle Years Programme curriculum (IB-MYP). Students may earn up to nine high school credits, depending on how many classes they pass.

7th Grade	8th Grade
IB MYP Language Arts-Reading	Honors IB MYP English I*
IB MYP Social Science	IB MYP Middle School Civics
Honors IB MYP Scientific Inquiry and Design*	Honors IB MYP Biology*
HS Algebra for MG*	HS Algebra for MG* or Honors IB MYP Integrated Mathematics II*
Honors IB MYP World Language Spanish I*	Honors IB MYP World Language Spanish II*
IB MYP Exploring Computer Science*	IB MYP Fine Arts Elective*
IB MYP Physical Education	IB MYP Physical Education

*denotes high school credit

== Notable alumni ==
- Jim Grabowski is a former NFL running back. He was selected in the first round of the 1966 American Football League draft by the Miami Dolphins and the first round of the 1966 NFL draft by the Green Bay Packers. He played in Super Bowl I and Super Bowl II.
- Robert Hanssen was a former FBI agent who was convicted of spying for the Soviet Union and Russia.
- Ken Henry, U.S. Olympic gold medalist in speed skating, 1952 Oslo. At the 1960 Winter Olympics in Squaw Valley, California, Henry was chosen to light the final torch at the opening ceremony.
- Jim Jacobs is the co-writer of the musical Grease, parts of which were based on his high school experiences at Taft.
- Terry Kath was a guitarist and co-founder of the band Chicago.
- Jerry Krause is the former general manager of the Chicago Bulls (1985–2003) whose teams won six NBA championships.
- Lynn Morley Martin is a former congresswoman who served as U.S. Secretary of Labor (1991–93).
- Donna Mills, class of 1958, is an actress whose best known role was as Abby on the television series Knots Landing.
- Howard Moore is the former basketball head coach for the University of Illinois at Chicago (2010–15).
- Jack Suwinski is an outfielder for the Pittsburgh Pirates MLB team.
- Joseph A. Tunzi is a Chicago-based author, publisher, and producer.
