= Brian Doherty (politician) =

American politician (born 1957)

Brian G. Doherty

Member of the Chicago City Council from the 41st ward
- In office May 1991 – May 2011
- Preceded by: Roman Pucinski
- Succeeded by: Mary O'Connor

Personal details
- Born: October 25, 1957 (age 68)
- Party: Republican Party (United States)
- Spouse: Rose Doherty
- Children: 2

Brian G. Doherty (born October 25, 1957) was the alderman of the 41st Ward (map) of the City of Chicago from 1991 to 2011. First elected to the Chicago City Council in 1991 when he defeated longtime incumbent Roman Pucinski, Doherty represented portions of the city's Northwest Side, including O'Hare International Airport. In 2010, Doherty won the Republican nomination for Illinois State Senate District 10 to replace retiring Senator James DeLeo (D-Chicago), but he lost the general election to John Mulroe. Doherty did not seek re-election after his defeat in the Senate contest and left office in 2011.

== Political career ==
While on the City Council, Doherty had a record of opposing property tax increases. Political columnist Russ Stewart wrote, "Doherty has opposed the Daley Administration on every tax hike ordinance." He voted for a sunshine ordinance that aimed to make it easier to determine how taxpayer dollars are spent on Tax Increment Financing (TIF) districts. He also established a Zoning Advisory Board to give residents a voice in local zoning issues.

Doherty was notable as the only member of the Republican Party in the Chicago City Council, but supported some of the policies of Chicago's Democratic Mayor Richard M. Daley. Doherty voted in favor of the mayor's parking meter plan that leases out the revenue rights to a private firm. According to the Chicago Tribune, the plan would increase the hourly meter rate at some Chicago parking meters to $6.50 in 2013.

In 1986, Doherty ran in the at-large election to be a member of the Cook County Board of Commissioners from the city of Chicago, succeeding in the primary to be one of ten Republican nominees, but losing the general election.

== Personal ==
Brian grew up in the Austin area as the oldest boy born to Irish immigrants, Dan and the late Kathleen Doherty. Brian attended St. Angela Grammar School and Lane Tech High School before earning a degree in Business Management from Northeastern in 1984. In 2005, Brian earned his Masters in Urban Studies from Loyola University.

Brian and his wife of 23 years, Rose (née Gillespie), are the parents of Katie and Kevin. They have resided in the Oriole Park Neighborhood for over 22 years. Brian also has a brother who is a high-ranking member of the Chicago Fire Department and he is also the uncle of the locally famous Kyle Doherty.

Doherty was a Chicago Golden Gloves boxer in 1973, 1974 and 1975, and was a Golden Gloves Finalist and Champion. He was a Chicago Park District Champion as a boxer from La Follette Park. Brian is also a frequent marathon runner and this year he completed his ninth marathon.
