= Celine Borzecka =

Blessed Celine Chludzińska Borzęcka
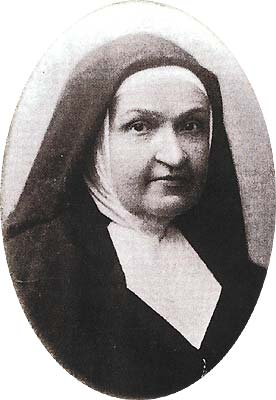

Virgin
- Born: 29 October 1833; Antowil, Orsha, Russian Empire
- Died: 26 October 1913 (aged 79); Kraków, Austria-Hungary
- Venerated in: Roman Catholic Church
- Beatified: 27 October 2007, Basilica of Saint John Lateran, Rome, Italy by Cardinal José Saraiva Martins
- Feast: 26 October

Celine Chludzińska Borzęcka (29 October 1833 – 26 October 1913) was a Polish religious sister and the co-foundress – along with her daughter Jadwiga Borzęcka – of the Congregation of the Sisters of the Resurrection. Borzęcka desired the religious life but married in obedience to her parents and bore four children; two died as infants. After her husband's death, she chose to follow the spiritual path with her daughter at her side and began a life in community in Rome.

Borzęcka's beatification cause was opened under Pope Paul VI on 10 April 1964 and Pope Benedict XVI beatified her on 27 October 2007.

== Life ==
Celine Chludzińska was born in Antowil near Orsha in the Russian Empire (now Vitebsk Oblast, Belarus) on 29 October 1833 as one of the three children of the rich land-owning Ignatius and Petronella Chludzińska; she was baptized as "Celine Rozalia Leonarda".

In her childhood she considered a religious vocation in a convent in Vilnius but out of obedience to her parents she married Józef Borzęcki (1820/1 - 1874) in 1853. During their marriage she gave birth to four children but two (Marynia and Kazimierz) died as infants. Her husband received her help in managing their estate and educated her two daughters Celine and Jadwiga (2 February 1863 - 26 September 1906) at home. In 1869 her husband suffered a stroke that left him paralyzed. Borzęcka sought out the best medical treatment for her husband and so all moved to Vienna. Józef died in 1874 not before having dictated his will to the couple's daughter Celine and after which the widow travelled with her two daughters to Rome.

In Rome she met the priest Piotr Semenenko who became her spiritual director. In 1882 she and her daughter Jadwiga - her daughter Celine had married at this stage - and two other women began living as a religious cluster. In 1887 she opened her first school where Giacomo della Chiesa (the future Pope Benedict XV) served as a chaplain.

On 6 January 1891 she founded the Sisters of the Resurrection in Rome and both Borzęcka and her daughter made their final vows. In fall 1891 the congregation's first house was opened in Kęty near Wadowice. Other houses soon followed in Poland as well as in Bulgaria and the United States of America. Borzęcka suffered the loss of her daughter Jadwiga in 1906 and she continued to lead the institute until 1911.

Borzęcka died on 26 October 1913 in Kraków. Her remains - and that of Jadwiga - were exhumed on 22 November 1937 and again on 3 April 2001. In 2008 there were 464 religious in 50 houses in places such as Canada and Australia. Her order received the pontifical decree of praise from Pope Pius X on 10 May 1905 while full papal approval from Pope Pius XI came after her death on 17 July 1923.

== Beatification ==
The superior of the order was received in a private papal audience on 8 January 1942 in which Pope Pius XII encouraged the prospects of a possible cause for beatification of the late foundress. An informative was held from 31 October 1944 until 16 March 1949 while testimonies were gathered from both Chicago and Kraków. Pope Pius XII formally opened her cause on 22 April 1949, granting her the title of Servant of God. The apostolic process later opened in 1964 and this closed on 29 December 1967.

The confirmation of her heroic virtue allowed for Pope John Paul II to title her as Venerable on 11 February 1982. The process for a miracle attributed to her opened in Kraków and Cardinal Franciszek Macharski oversaw the diocesan investigation from 25 January to 10 April 2002. A medical board of seven experts approved this healing to be something that science could not explain on 9 June 2005 while six theologians also approved this same thing on 15 November 2005. The cardinal and bishop members of the C.C.S. also voted in favor of this on 20 June 2006 and Pope Benedict XVI confirmed the miracle - and the beatification - on 16 December 2006. Cardinal José Saraiva Martins presided over the beatification on 27 October 2007 on the pope's behalf in the Basilica of Saint John Lateran.

The current postulator for this cause is Wiesław Śpiewak.
