= Noble–Seymour–Crippen House =

Historic house in Illinois, United States

- U.S. National Register of Historic Places
- Chicago Landmark
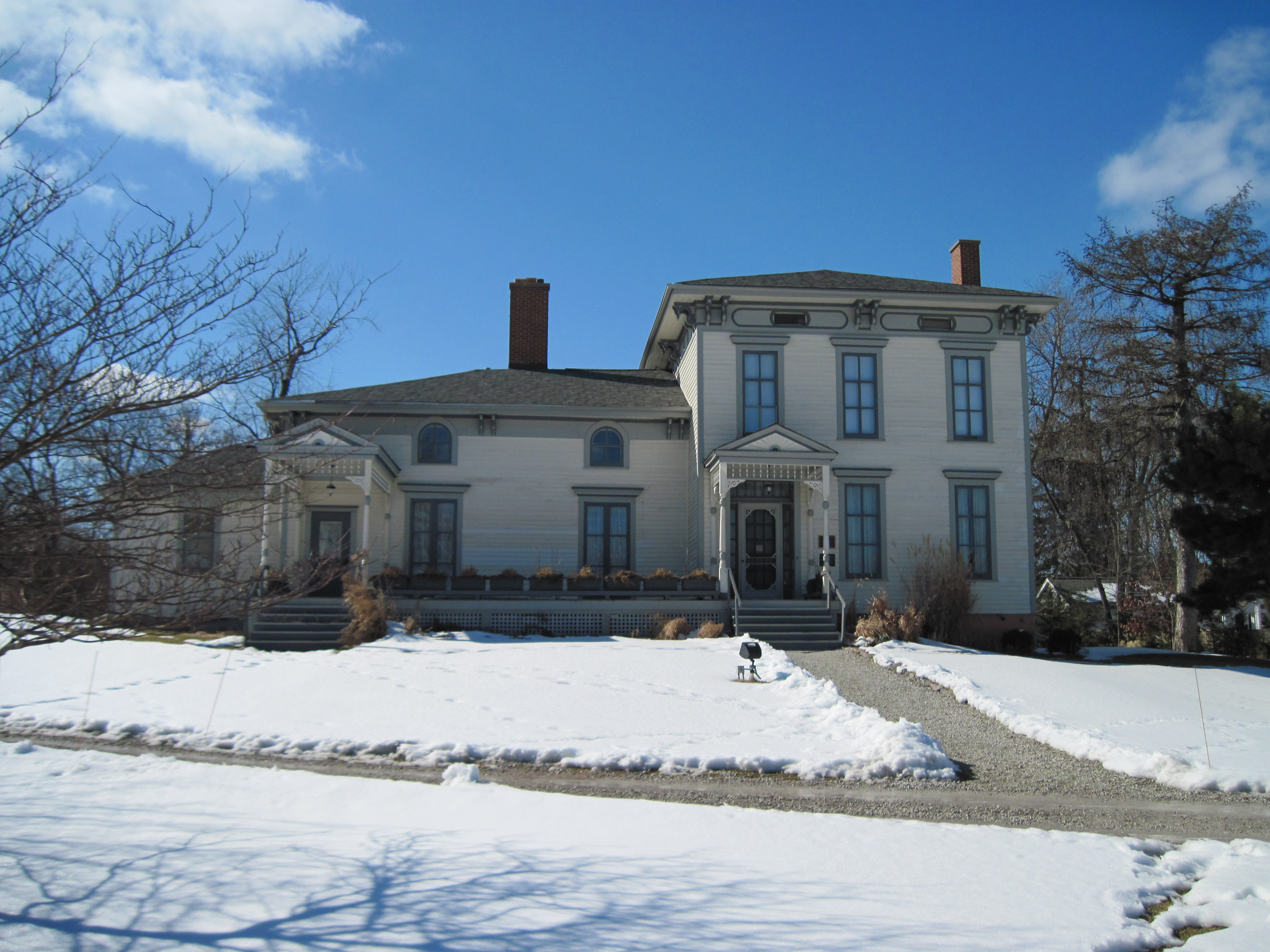
- Noble–Seymour–Crippen House

- Location within Chicago metropolitan area Location within Illinois Location within the United States
- Location: 5622-5624 N. Newark Ave., Chicago, Illinois
- Coordinates: 41°59′1″N 87°47′45.5″W
- Built: 1833
- Architectural style: Italianate
- NRHP reference No.: 00000950

Significant dates
- Added to NRHP: August 10, 2000
- Designated CHICL: May 11, 1988

The Noble–Seymour–Crippen House is a mansion located at 5624 North Newark Avenue in Chicago's Norwood Park community area. Its southern wing, built in 1833, is widely considered the oldest existing building in Chicago, as well as the 22nd oldest in the state of Illinois.

== History ==
The southern wing of the house was originally used as a farmhouse by Mark Noble Sr., an English immigrant. The frame structure was approximately 25 by 30 feet (7.6 m × 9.1 m) and the main entrance was in the center of the south-facing end, facing Talcott Road. It was built with white pine on a brick foundation. The center of the building featured a fireplace and there was probably a basement. A window was found on each side of the main door; there were probably also two windows along each of the long sides.

In 1868, Thomas Hartley Seymour of the Chicago Board of Trade purchased the house and surrounding land. He immediately added an Italianate style northern wing to accommodate his large family and servants. He also raised the roof on the older section, the south wing, to build a second floor. This also allowed for the implementation of round, arched windows. A small, wood frame summer kitchen was added to the south gable of the south wing. The family used the first floor of the former Noble house as a large dining room and they used the second floor as servants' quarters. To ensure architectural harmony with the newer section, a frieze was added to this wing below the roof.

The Italianate addition has a typical floor plan for the era. A side entry hall with a stairway opens to a parlor, library, and dining room (the latter being the former Noble house). The second floor was used for bedrooms with a connecting door to the servants' quarters. In the 1890s, Seymour built a wood porch stretching from the south wing entrance to the Italianate entrance. Porticoes were installed over each door.

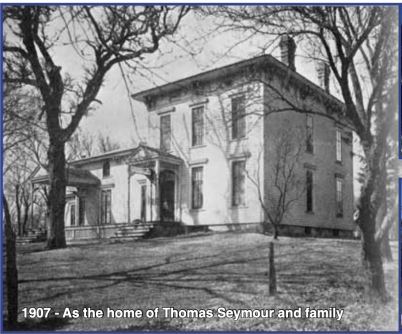

The Seymour family lived at the site until 1916, when they sold it to Stuart and Charlotte Allen Crippen, a concert pianist and an actress. During the 1920s, the Crippens installed indoor plumbing and electricity and added a second stairway to the Noble wing. The Crippen children and grandchildren sold the building to the Norwood Park Historical Society in 1987.

The Noble–Seymour–Crippen House received Chicago Landmark status on May 11, 1988. It was added to the National Register of Historic Places on August 10, 2000.

Since 1998, the building has served the Norwood Park Historical Society Museum and community center.

== In popular culture ==
The house appears in the 1992 film The Babe.
