= Hedwig Borzecka =

Polish Servant of God (1863–1906)

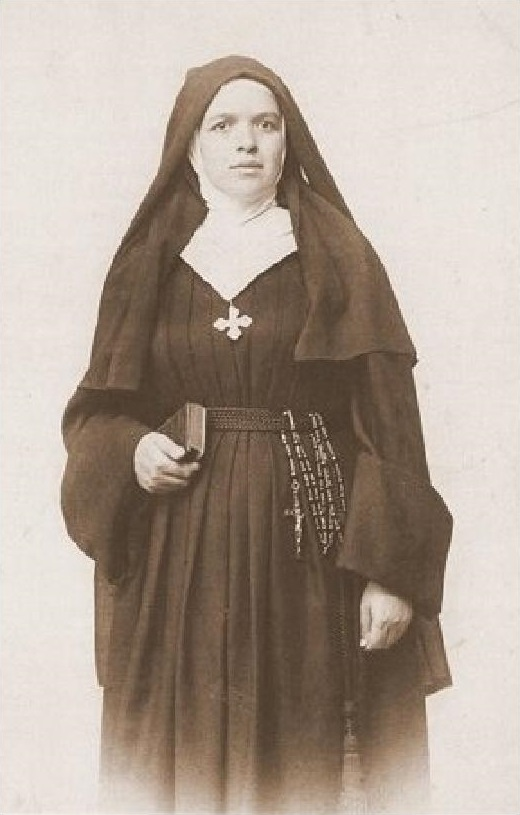
Hedwig Borzecka, c.1900

Hedwig Borzęcka, sometimes written as Jadwiga Borzęcka, (1 February 1863 – 27 September 1906) was a religious sister and the co-foundress of the Congregation of the Sisters of the Resurrection along with her natural mother, Celine Borzecka.

She was born in the Russian Empire. Her father was Józef Borzęcki. On 17 December 1982, this Servant of God was declared as having heroic virtue by Pope John Paul II, thus becoming known as venerable.
