= Irving Park =

Irving Park may refer to several places:

== Parks ==
- Irving Nature Park, a park near Saint John, New Brunswick, Canada
- Irving Park (Portland, Oregon), a park in northeast Portland, Oregon, U.S.
- Washington Irving Memorial Park and Arboretum, a park and arboretum in Bixby, Oklahoma, U.S.

== Transit stations ==
- Irving Park station (Metra), a railroad station on Metra's Union Pacific Northwest Line in Chicago's Irving Park neighborhood
- Irving Park station (CTA Blue Line), a station on the Chicago Transit Authority's system of rapid transit
- Irving Park station (CTA Brown Line), a station on the Chicago Transit Authority's system of rapid transit

== Neighborhoods ==
- Irving Park, Chicago, a Community Area in Northwest Chicago
- Irving Park Historic District, a neighborhood in Greensboro, North Carolina

== Roads ==
- Irving Park Road, an alternate name for Illinois Route 19 east of Elgin; it passes through Chicago's Irving Park Community Area

== People ==
- R. Irving Parkes (1886–1931), Canadian athlete
