= Irving Park station =

Irving Park station could refer to:

- Irving Park station (Metra), a commuter rail station in the Irving Park neighborhood of Chicago, Illinois, United States on the Union Pacific Northwest Line
- Irving Park station (CTA Blue Line), a rapid transit station adjacent to the commuter rail station in the Kennedy Expressway median
- Irving Park station (CTA Brown Line), a rapid transit station in North Center
