= Gladstone Park =

Gladstone Park may refer to:

- Gladstone Park, Victoria, an Australian suburb
- Gladstone Park, Chicago
  - Gladstone Park station, a railway station
- Gladstone Park, London
