= Dee Road station =

Commuter rail station in Park Ridge, Illinois

Dee Road

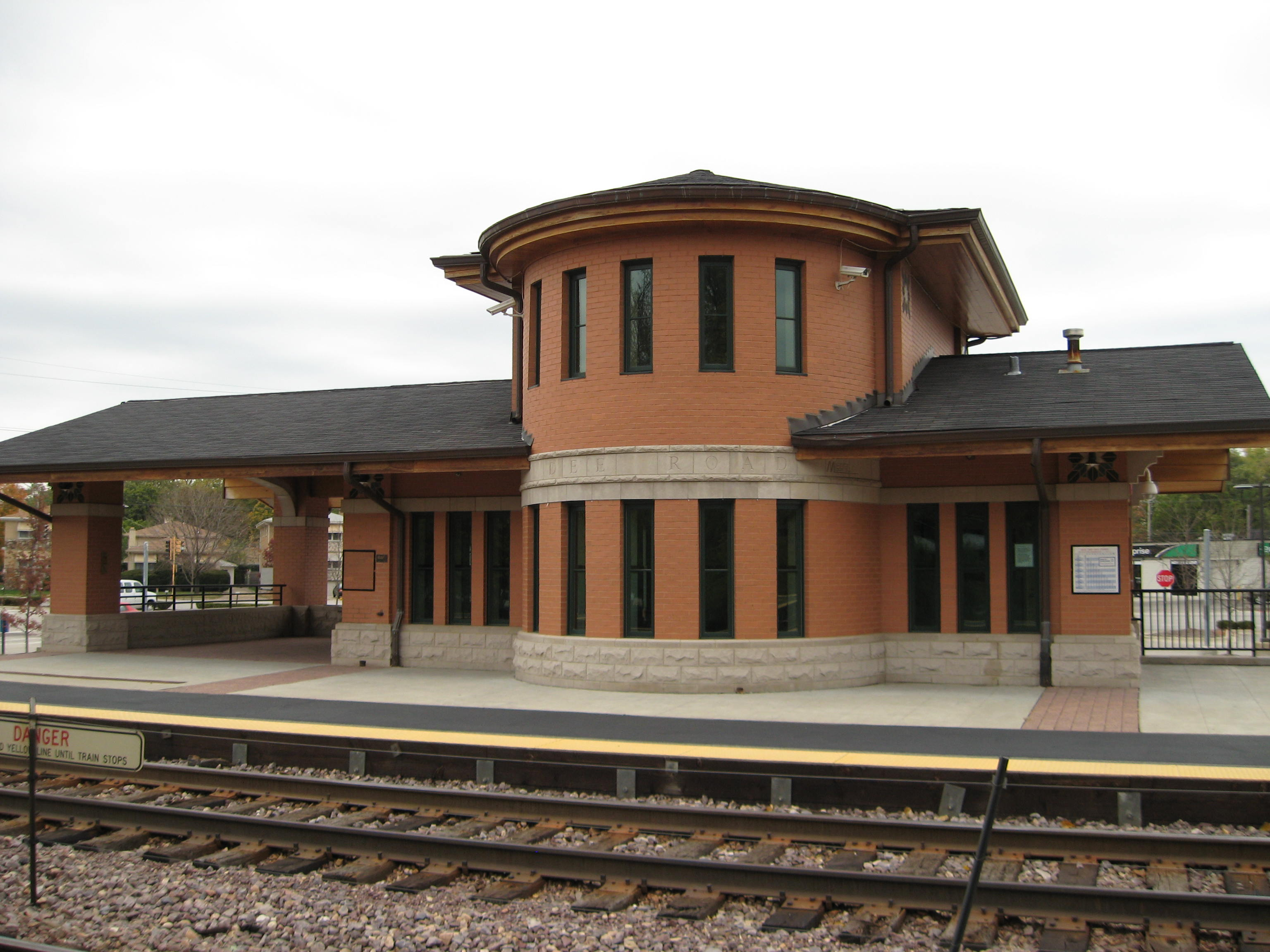

General information
- Location: 881 North Dee Road; Park Ridge, Illinois 60068
- Coordinates: 42.0241°N 87.8562°W
- Owner: Metra
- Platforms: 1 Side platform 1 Island platform
- Tracks: 3
- Connections: Pace Buses

Construction
- Parking: Yes
- Accessible: Yes

Other information
- Fare zone: 2

History
- Opened: 1967
- Rebuilt: June 1, 2006

Passengers
- 2018: 594 (average weekday) ▲15.3%
- Rank: 85 out of 236

Services
Preceding station	Metra	Following station
Des Plaines toward Harvard or McHenry	Union Pacific Northwest	Park Ridge toward Ogilvie TC
Former services
Preceding station	Chicago and North Western Railway	Following station
Des Plaines toward Crystal Lake	Wisconsin Division	Edison Park toward Chicago
Track layout
Location

Dee Road is one of two commuter railroad stations on Metra's Union Pacific Northwest Line in the city of Park Ridge, Illinois. It is officially located at 881 North Dee Road, and is 15.1 miles (24.3 km) from Ogilvie Transportation Center in Chicago. In Metra's zone-based fare system, Dee Road is in zone 2. As of 2018, Dee Road is the 85th busiest of the 236 non-downtown stations in the Metra system, with an average of 594 weekday boardings.

As of May 30, 2023, Dee Road is served by 50 trains (25 in each direction) on weekdays, by 31 trains (16 inbound, 15 outbound) on Saturdays, and by 19 trains (nine inbound, 10 outbound) on Sundays.

The station was rebuilt in 2006 as a replacement for the former station on the opposite side of Dee Road, built by the Chicago and North Western Railway in 1967.

The smaller parking area between Dee Road and Rowe Avenue, where the old station used to be, was recommended by Metra, as well as parking at nearby Park Ridge. Bus connections are provided by Pace.

== Bus connections ==
Pace

- 209 Busse Highway (weekdays only)
- 226 Oakton Street (weekdays only)
- 240 Dee Road (weekday rush hours only)
