= Ojala Foundation =

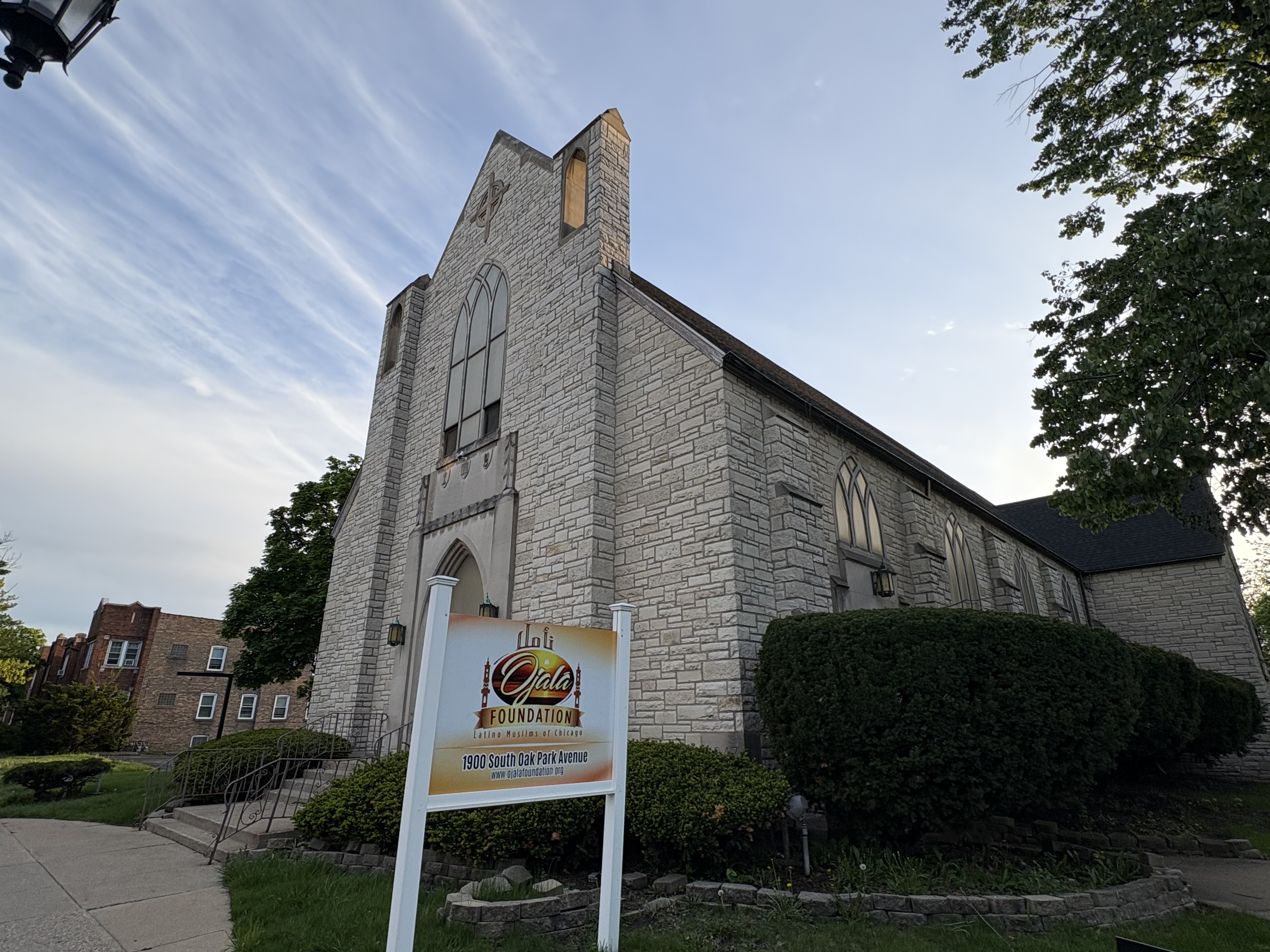
- Formation: May 2018
- Type: Nonprofit organization
- Headquarters: Berwyn, IL
- President: Christopher AbdulKareem Pavlićek
- Website: ojalafoundation.org

Ojala Foundation is a nonprofit organization based in the Chicago metropolitan area, founded in 2018 by Christopher AbdulKareem Pavlićek, along with co-founders Shirley Chun and Raul Gonzalez. The foundation acts as a cultural and religious bridge, providing Islamic programming in Spanish, community outreach and religious services tailored to Latino converts to Islam. In addition to its focus on the Muslim community, the organization also provides humanitarian assistance, including food distribution and assistance for individuals experiencing homelessness.

The foundation name is derived from the Spanish word "Ojala" meaning "God willing" or "hopefully," whose linguistics roots trace back to the Arabic phrase "Inshallah."

== History ==
The Ojala Foundation was established in May 2018 with the launch of Neighborly Deeds, a weekly program designed to address the needs of Latino Muslims in Chicago; a group described as underserved within both Latino and Muslim communities. Reporting of their earliest activities included organizing food distribution events and volunteer service programs in the Chicago area.

Before The Ojala Foundation had its own permanent headquarters, the organization hosted events in temporary spaces, including parking lots, homes, and storage lockers. Over time, the organization expanded to include outreach to homeless individuals experiencing homelessness and developing Spanish-language religious services. The foundation aims to build familiar relationships between the volunteers and individuals receiving assistance as part of their outreach efforts. The foundation also provides educational classes, social events, other outreach efforts, and iftars to break fasts during the holy month of Ramadan.

On May 5, 2025, the foundation obtained a former church in Berwyn, Illinois, and transformed it into a mosque that serves as the organization's permanent community center. The mosque in Chicago is in a Latino majority neighborhood, welcoming many converts of Vietnamese, Polish, Italian, and many other backgrounds. The Ojala Islamic Center officially opened on February 17, 2026, the first day of Ramadan, and was described as the first Latino-led mosque in the Midwest.

== Programs ==
The Ojala Foundation organizes several programs focused on service and community support. Neighborly Deeds, a weekly volunteer program on Chicago's West Side, was one of the main initiatives of the Ojala Foundation which was launched in 2018. The program would provide food, clothing, assistance and seasonal care supplies to individuals experiencing homelessness in Chicago.

The organization also provides Spanish-language religious programming and educational classes for Latino Muslims. Media coverage has noted that these programs address a language gap within many Muslim Latino communities in the United States, where religious services are conducted in English or Arabic.

== Community outreach ==
The Ojala Foundation's activities are centered on social services, religious education, and cultural advocacy, mainly serving Latino Muslim communities in the Chicago area. Its programming is designed to bridge cultural identities of this community while providing broader humanitarian aid.

In 2023, the foundation organized what co-founder Christopher Abdulkareem Pavlicek described as Chicago's first all-Spanish Eid prayer service. This includes religious and educational programming designed for Spanish-speaking Muslims and converts to Islam. These activities cover classes in Spanish about the Islamic Law (Fiqh) and religious practices (Sunnah), as well as a "Convert Care" program led by volunteers to ease the transition for new Muslims. The organization hosts inclusive cultural events, such as Eid-al-Fitr services conducted entirely in Spanish, which have drawn hundreds of attendees to Jefferson Park. These events are designed to be accessible to non-Muslim family members and have been described as among the most diverse religious gatherings in the Chicago area.

Beyond religious activities, the Ojala Foundation engages in civic activities among the neighborhood intended to foster community pride and leadership. This includes "Andando y Limpiando" (Walking and Cleaning), a periodic neighborhood cleanup project, as well as annual back to school drives that provide backpacks and supplies to local youth regardless of their faith. During some outreach efforts, volunteers also shared information about immigration enforcement activity in the area with community members.

With the 2025 acquisition of a permanent facility in Berwyn, Illinois, the foundation transitioned its activities from temporary locations to permanent community gatherings. This center now hosts daily prayers, community events, and educational seminars in Spanish, furthering the organization's mission to serve as a permanent resource for the growing Latino Muslim community.
