= Park Ridge station =

Park Ridge station could refer to:

- Park Ridge station (Illinois) in Park Ridge, Illinois
- Park Ridge station (NJ Transit) in Park Ridge, New Jersey
