= Jefferson Park Transit Center =

Transport hub in Chicago, Illinois

Jefferson Park Jefferson Park 4900N 5400W

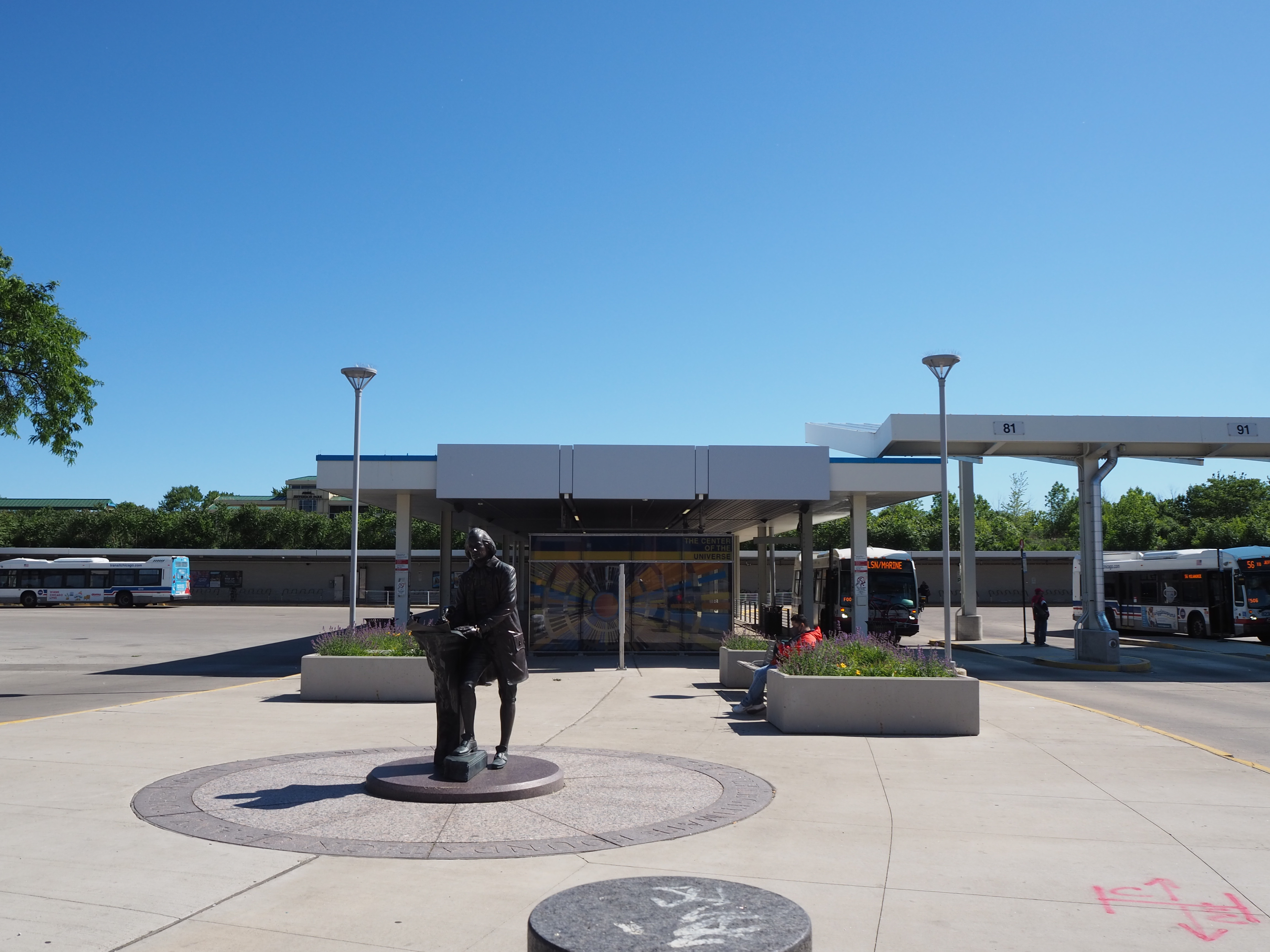
- Bus terminal at the Jefferson Park Transit Center

General information
- Location: 4963 North Milwaukee Avenue (Metra); 4917 North Milwaukee Avenue (CTA); Jefferson Park, Chicago, Illinois 60630
- Coordinates: 41°58′15″N 87°45′40″W
- Owner: Chicago Transit Authority & Metra
- Lines: UP Harvard Subdivision (Metra); O'Hare Branch (CTA)
- Platforms: 1 side platform, 1 island platform (Metra); 1 island platform (CTA)
- Tracks: 3 (Metra); 2 (CTA)
- Connections: CTA Buses; Pace Buses

Construction
- Structure type: Elevated (Metra); Expressway median (CTA)
- Platform levels: 3
- Parking: Yes, $1.50 (Independent)
- Cycle facilities: Yes
- Accessible: Yes

Other information
- Fare zone: 2 (Metra)

History
- Opened: circa 1858; 168 years ago (CStP&FDL); February 1, 1970; 56 years ago (CTA)
- Rebuilt: 1958; 68 years ago (C&NW); 2000–2001; 25 years ago (elevator added, minor renovations); 2018–2019; 7 years ago (bus terminal and station renovation)

Passengers
- 2025: 1,442,977 ▲3.5% (CTA)
- 2018: 510 (avg. weekday) ▼22.3% (Metra)
- Rank: 97 out of 236 (Metra)

Services
Preceding station	Metra	Following station
Gladstone Park Weekday limited toward Harvard or McHenry	Union Pacific Northwest	Irving Park toward Ogilvie TC
Preceding station	Chicago "L"	Following station
Harlem toward O'Hare	Blue Line	Montrose toward Forest Park
Preceding station	Pace Pulse	Following station
Central toward Golf Mill	Milwaukee Line	Terminus
Former services
Preceding station	Chicago and North Western Railway	Following station
Park Ridge toward Minneapolis	Chicago – Minneapolis via Madison	Clybourn toward Chicago
Gladstone Park toward Crystal Lake	Wisconsin Division	Mayfair toward Chicago
Track layout
Key
Location

The Jefferson Park Transit Center is an intermodal passenger transport hub in the Jefferson Park neighborhood of Chicago, Illinois. It serves as a station for rail and also as a bus terminal. Jefferson Park Transit Center's railroad station is on Metra's Union Pacific Northwest Line, with the station located at 4963 North Milwaukee Avenue. Jefferson Park is 9.1 miles (14.6 km) away from Ogilvie Transportation Center in downtown Chicago, the inbound terminus of the Union Pacific Northwest Line. Under Metra's zone-based fare system, Jefferson Park is in zone 2. As of 2018, Jefferson Park is the 97th busiest of Metra's 236 non-downtown stations, with an average of 510 weekday boardings.

As of May 30, 2023, Metra's Jefferson Park station is served by 60 trains (29 inbound, 31 outbound) on weekdays, by 31 trains (16 inbound, 15 outbound) on Saturdays, and by 19 trains (nine inbound, 10 outbound) on Sundays.

It is also an 'L' station on the Blue Line, which stops at a single island platform in the median of the Kennedy Expressway at 4917 North Milwaukee Avenue. Blue Line trains run 24 hours a day, 7 days a week, with intervals of as little as 2–7 minutes during rush hour, and take 25 minutes to travel to the Loop. From 1970 to 1983, this was the terminal for West-Northwest Line trains once service was extended from Logan Square and until it was further extended to Rosemont.

== History ==
The original Jefferson Park Station was built in the late 1850s, by the Chicago, St. Paul and Fond du Lac Railroad at ground level, and became part of the Chicago and North Western Railway when the CStP&F went bankrupt in 1859. C&NW raised it above ground in 1958. On February 1, 1970, Jefferson Park's 'L' station opened as the northwestern terminus of the Kennedy Expressway extension of the CTA's Milwaukee Line (now the Blue Line), as an addition to the Jefferson Park Chicago & North Western depot. The station was designed by Skidmore, Owings and Merrill. In 1983, the branch was extended past Jefferson Park to River Road, and then from River Road to O'Hare International Airport in 1984. The station was renovated in 2000–2001, and an elevator added to aid access. In 2005, a monument to Thomas Jefferson was placed along the station's entrance along Milwaukee Avenue.

=== Structure ===
The Metra station has three tracks, a side platform for the inbound local track, and an island platform for the center express track and outbound local track. The side platform serves inbound trains, and the southwest platform serves outbound trains as well as the center track which carries both express trains in the peak direction as well as trains that short-turn at Des Plaines. As of April 25, 2022, one train in each peak period stops at Jefferson Park on the center track. A station house open from 5:00 A.M. to 1:00 P.M. is located on the inbound platform. There is no ticket agent at Jefferson Park, so tickets must be purchased on board the train or with the Ventra app. Jefferson Park has a park and ride lot operated by Imperial Parking.

The Blue Line station is located in the median of the Kennedy Expressway, and like all other stations on this segment, has two tracks and one island platform. A middle track exists in between the operating tracks from the station to Foster Avenue, and is used for short-turning trains during weekday rush hours. The middle track is a remnant of a small storage yard that existed from 1970 to 1983 when Jefferson Park was the line's northern terminus.

== Jefferson Park Transit Center Modernization project ==
The $25 million project began at the Jefferson Park Transit Center on October 1, 2018, and was completed on July 23, 2019.

== Bus connections ==
CTA

- 56 Milwaukee
- 68 Northwest Highway
- 81 Lawrence (Owl Service)
- 81W West Lawrence
- 85 Central
- 85A North Central (Monday-Saturday only)
- 88 Higgins
- 91 Austin
- 92 Foster

Pace

- 225 Central/Howard (Weekday Rush Hours only)
- 226 Oakton Street (Weekdays only)
- 270 Milwaukee Avenue
- Pulse Milwaukee Line

== Image gallery ==
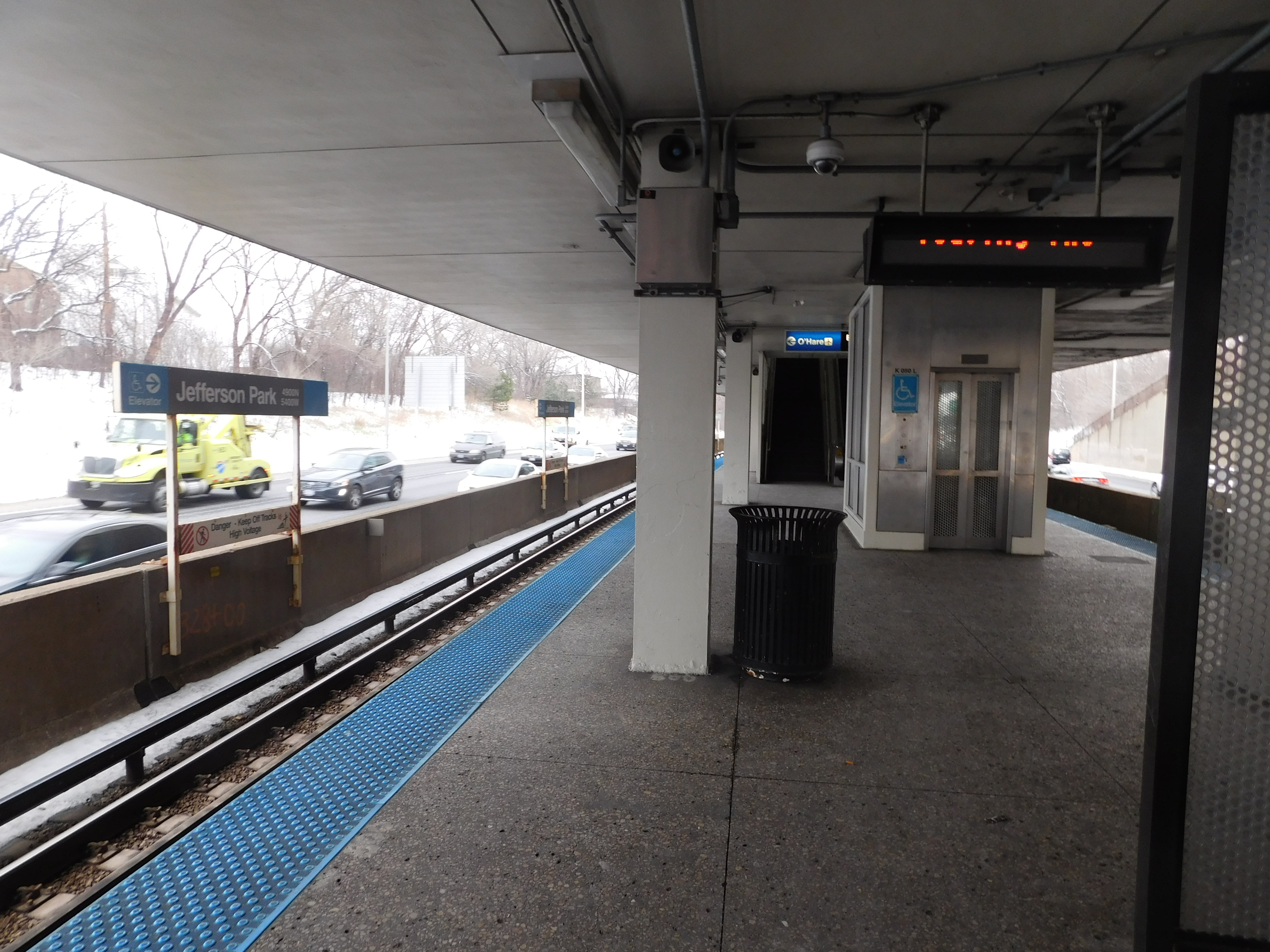
Blue Line platform

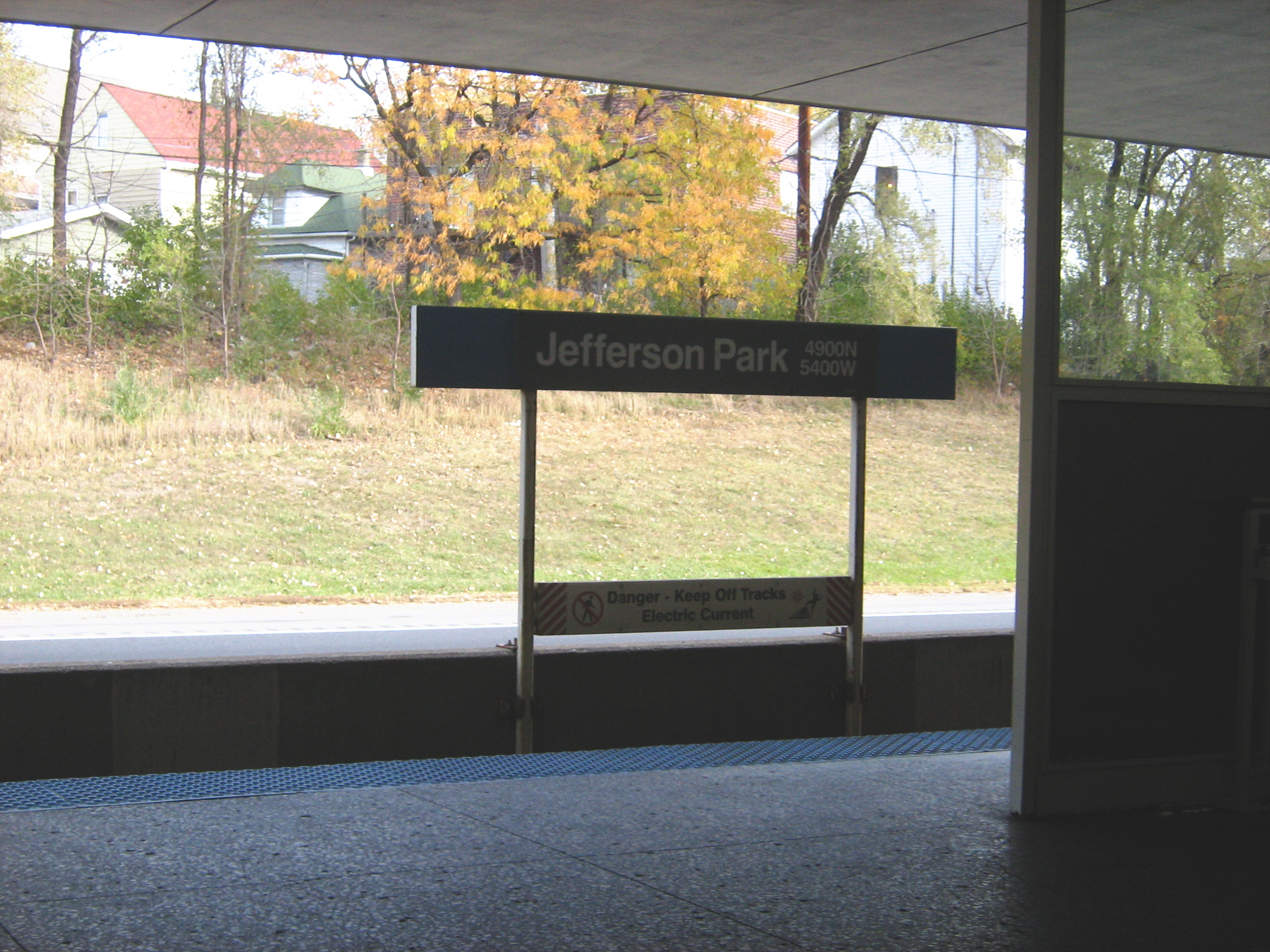
Blue Line platform sign

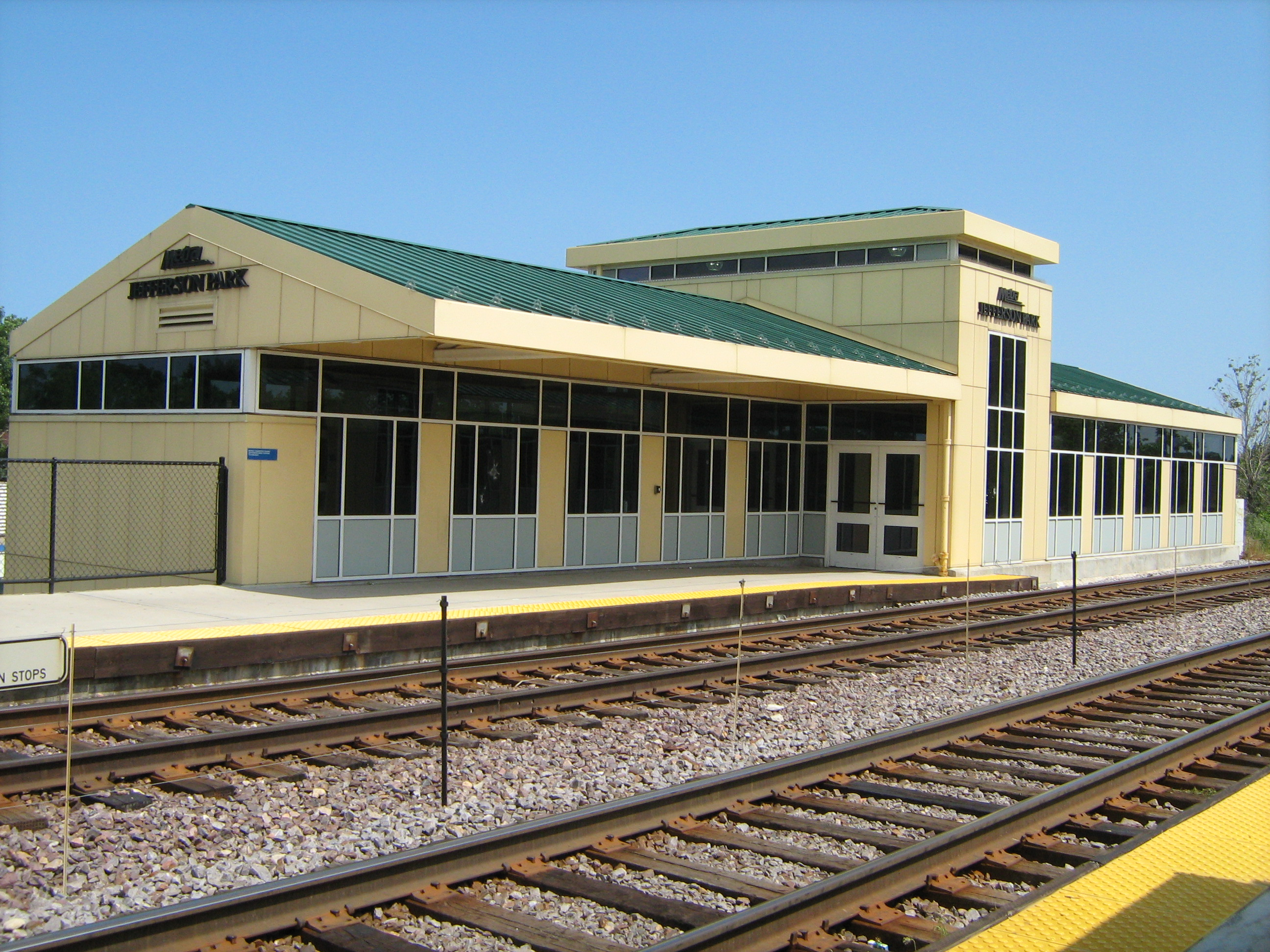
Metra platforms and station house

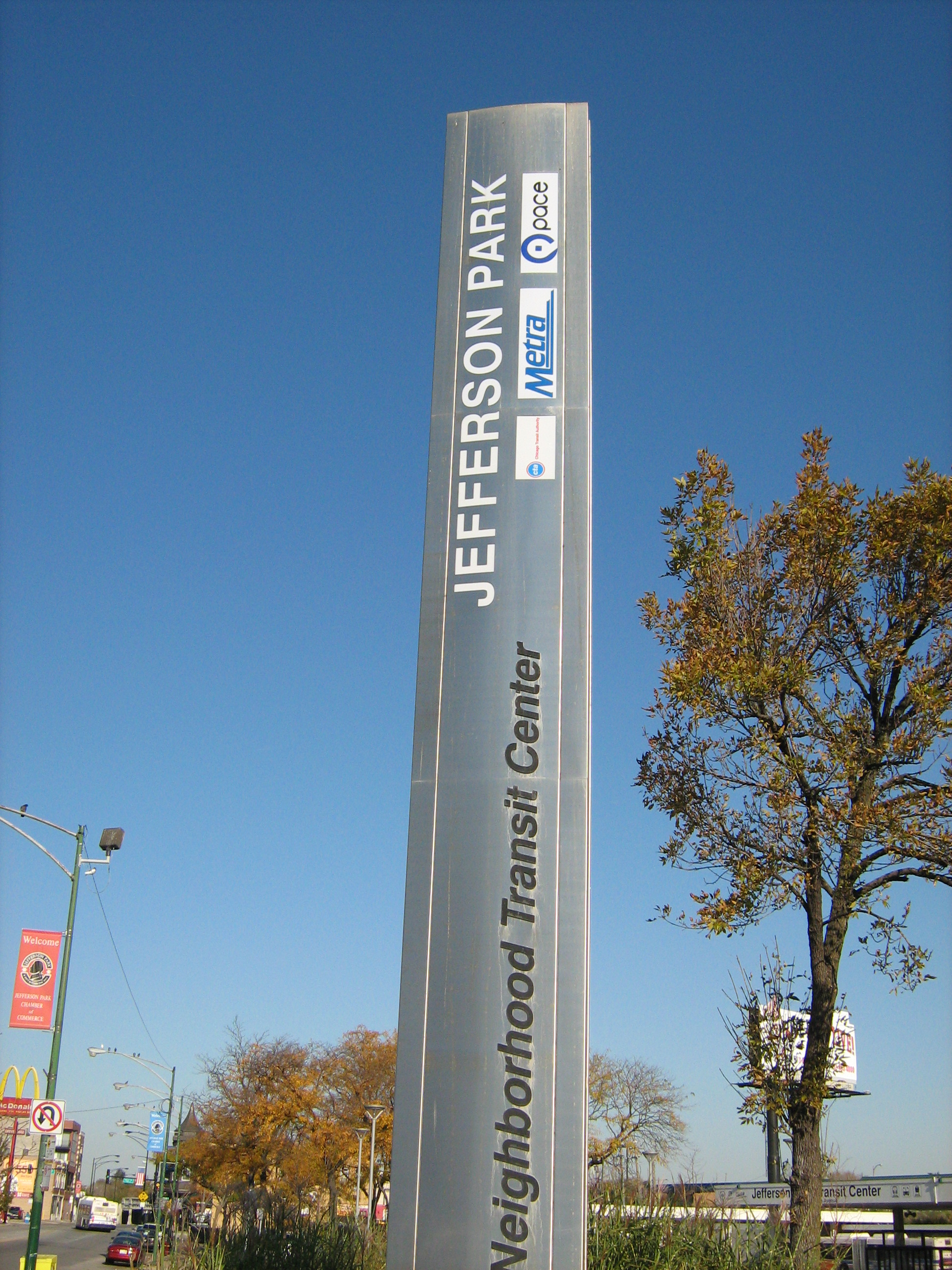
Station sign
