= Mount Prospect station =

Commuter rail station in Illinois

Mount Prospect

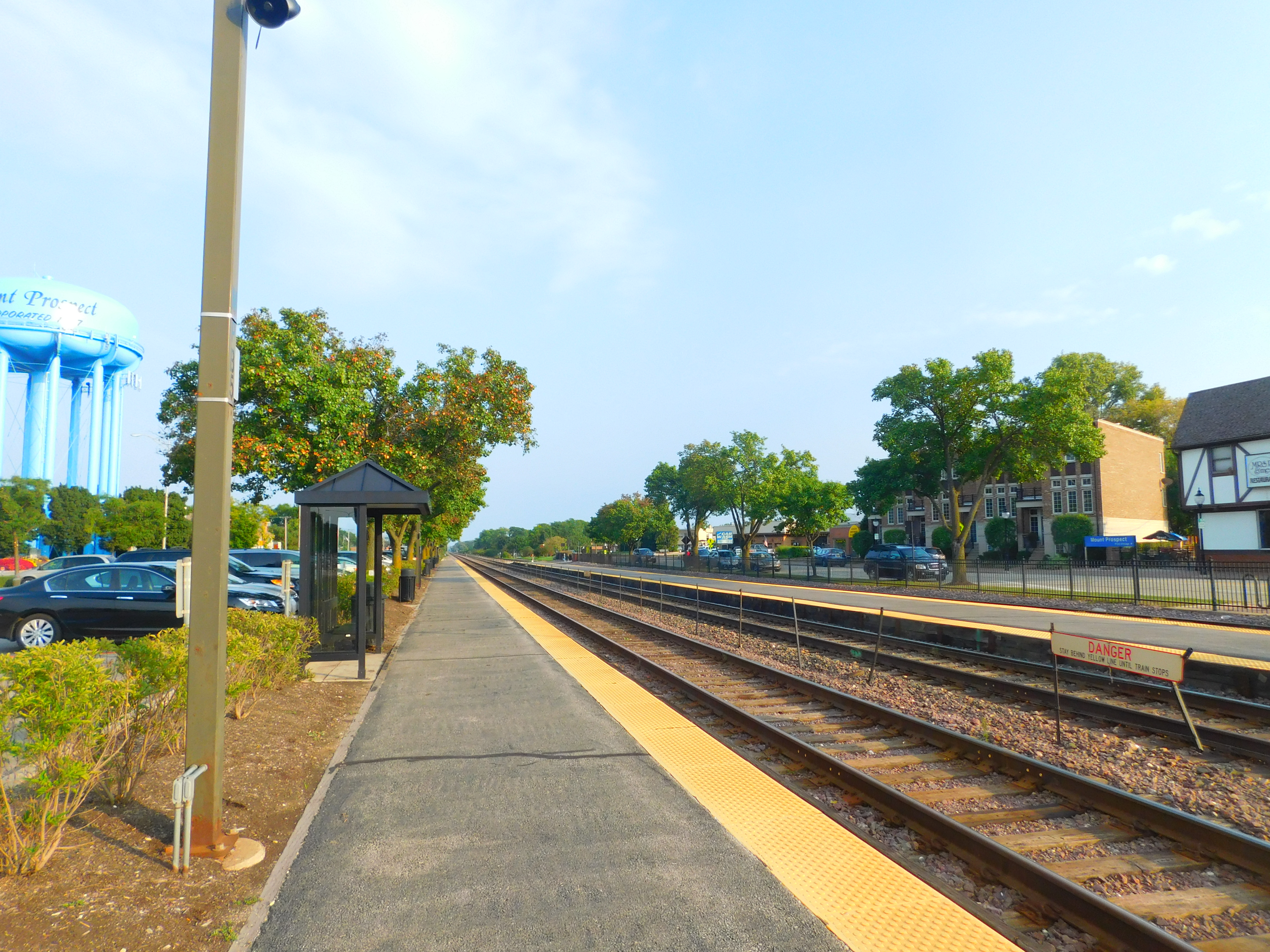

General information
- Location: 13 East Northwest Highway; Mount Prospect, Illinois
- Coordinates: 42.0631°N 87.9361°W
- Owner: Metra
- Platforms: 1 side platform, 1 island platform
- Tracks: 3 tracks
- Connections: Pace buses

Construction
- Accessible: Yes

Other information
- Fare zone: 3

History
- Opened: 1930

Passengers
- 2018: 1,879 (average weekday) ▲3.5%
- Rank: 11 out of 236

Services
Preceding station	Metra	Following station
Arlington Heights toward Harvard or McHenry	Union Pacific Northwest	Cumberland toward Ogilvie TC
Former services
Preceding station	Chicago and North Western Railway	Following station
Arlington Heights toward Crystal Lake	Wisconsin Division	Cumberland toward Chicago
Track layout
Location

Mount Prospect is a station on Metra's Union Pacific Northwest Line located in Mount Prospect, Illinois. The station is located at 13 E. Northwest Highway near its intersection with Main St. (Illinois Route 83). Mount Prospect is 20.0 miles (32.2 km) from Ogilvie Transportation Center, the Northwest Line's southern terminus. In Metra's zone-based fare structure, Mount Prospect is located in zone 3. As of 2018, Mount Prospect is the 11th busiest of the 236 non-downtown stations in the Metra system, with an average of 1,879 weekday boardings.

The station has three tracks; an outbound track to the southwest, an inbound track to the northeast, and a bidirectional express track in the middle. There is a station house on the inbound platform where tickets may be purchased. Parking is available near Mount Prospect.

As of May 30, 2023, Mount Prospect is served by 62 trains (31 in each direction) on weekdays, by 31 trains (16 inbound, 15 outbound) on Saturdays, and by 19 trains (nine inbound, 10 outbound) on Sundays.

== Bus connections ==
Pace

- 234 Wheeling/Des Plaines (weekdays only)
