= Arlington Heights station =

Commuter rail station in Arlington Heights, Illinois

Arlington Heights

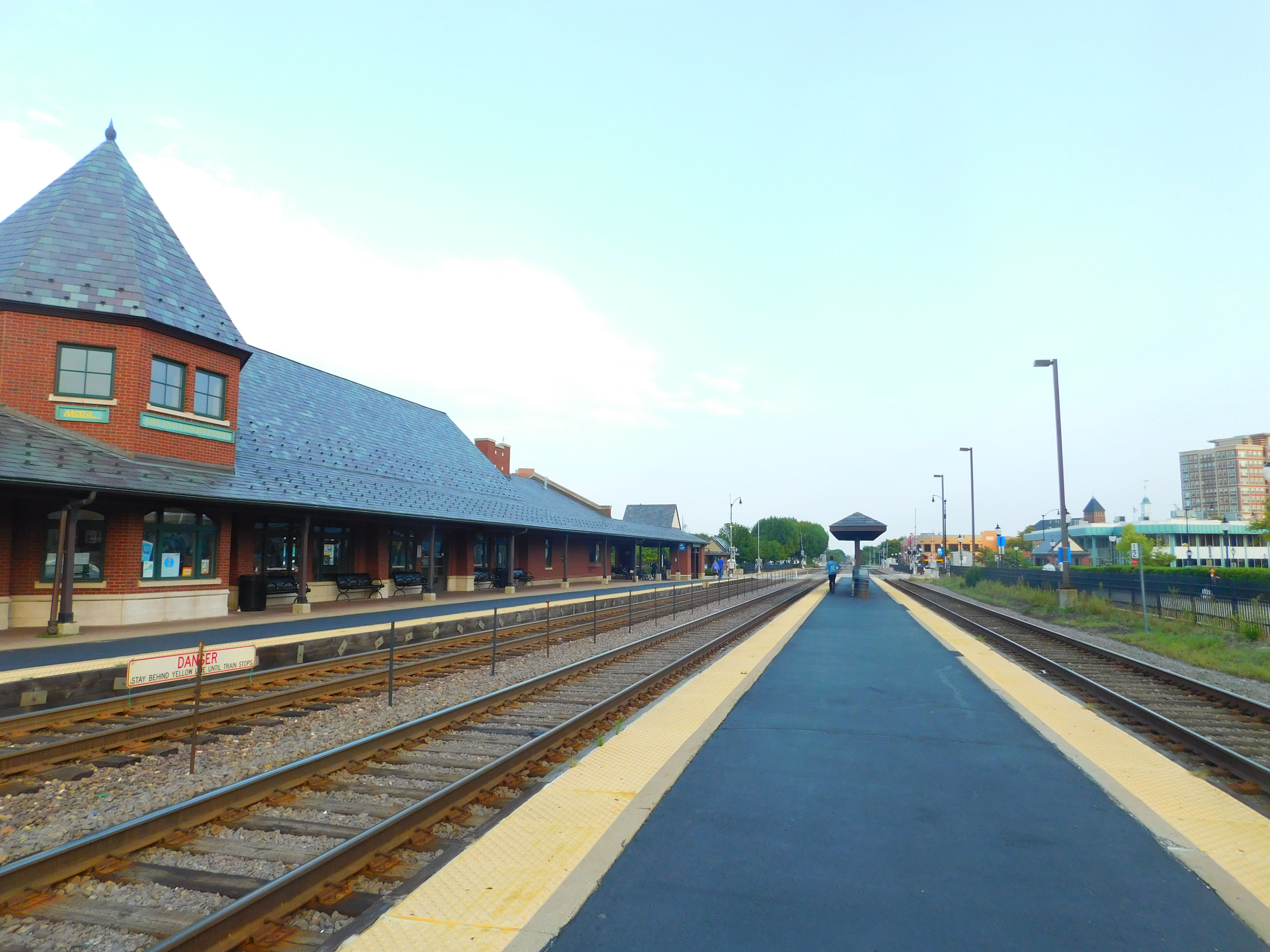

General information
- Location: 45 West Northwest Highway; Arlington Heights, Illinois
- Coordinates: 42.0843°N 87.9836°W
- Owner: Village of Arlington Heights
- Platforms: 1 side platform (formerly 2), 1 island platform
- Tracks: 3

Construction
- Parking: Yes
- Cycle facilities: Yes
- Accessible: Yes

Other information
- Fare zone: 3

History
- Opened: 1854
- Rebuilt: 2000

Passengers
- October 2025: 1,400 (average weekday)
- Rank: 7 out of 236

Services
Preceding station	Metra	Following station
Arlington Park toward Harvard or McHenry	Union Pacific Northwest	Mount Prospect toward Ogilvie TC
Former services
Preceding station	Chicago and North Western Railway	Following station
Arlington Park toward Crystal Lake	Wisconsin Division	Mount Prospect toward Chicago
Track layout
Location

Arlington Heights is one of two commuter railroad stations along Metra's Union Pacific Northwest Line in the village of Arlington Heights, Illinois. The station is located at 45 West Northwest Highway (US 14), between Vail and Dunton Avenues, and lies 22.9 miles (36.9 km) from Ogilvie Transportation Center in Chicago and 40.3 miles (64.9 km) from Harvard. In Metra's zone-based fare system, Arlington Heights is in zone 3. As of 2025, Arlington Heights is the seventh busiest of the 236 non-downtown stations in the Metra system, with an average of 1,400 weekday boardings.

As of May 30, 2023, Arlington Heights is served by 62 trains (31 in each direction) on weekdays, by all 34 trains (17 in each direction) on Saturdays, and by all 21 trains (10 inbound, 11 outbound) on Sundays. One inbound train originates from Arlington Heights on weekends and holidays.

Parking is available along Northwest Highway and the north side of the tracks from east of Walnut Avenue to Dunton Avenue. It is also available on the south side of the tracks between Vail and Dunton Avenues leading into Payton Run. A much larger parking lot exists on the south side of the track between Evergreen Avenue and Arlington Heights Road north of Sigwalt Street. A fourth parking lot is available north of US 14 along Vail Avenue between St. James and Fremont Streets. Three others are not available to commuters.

There is a newsstand, restroom and staffed (weekday mornings) ticket agent inside the station building.
