= Jefferson Memorial Park =

- U.S. National Register of Historic Places
- U.S. Historic district
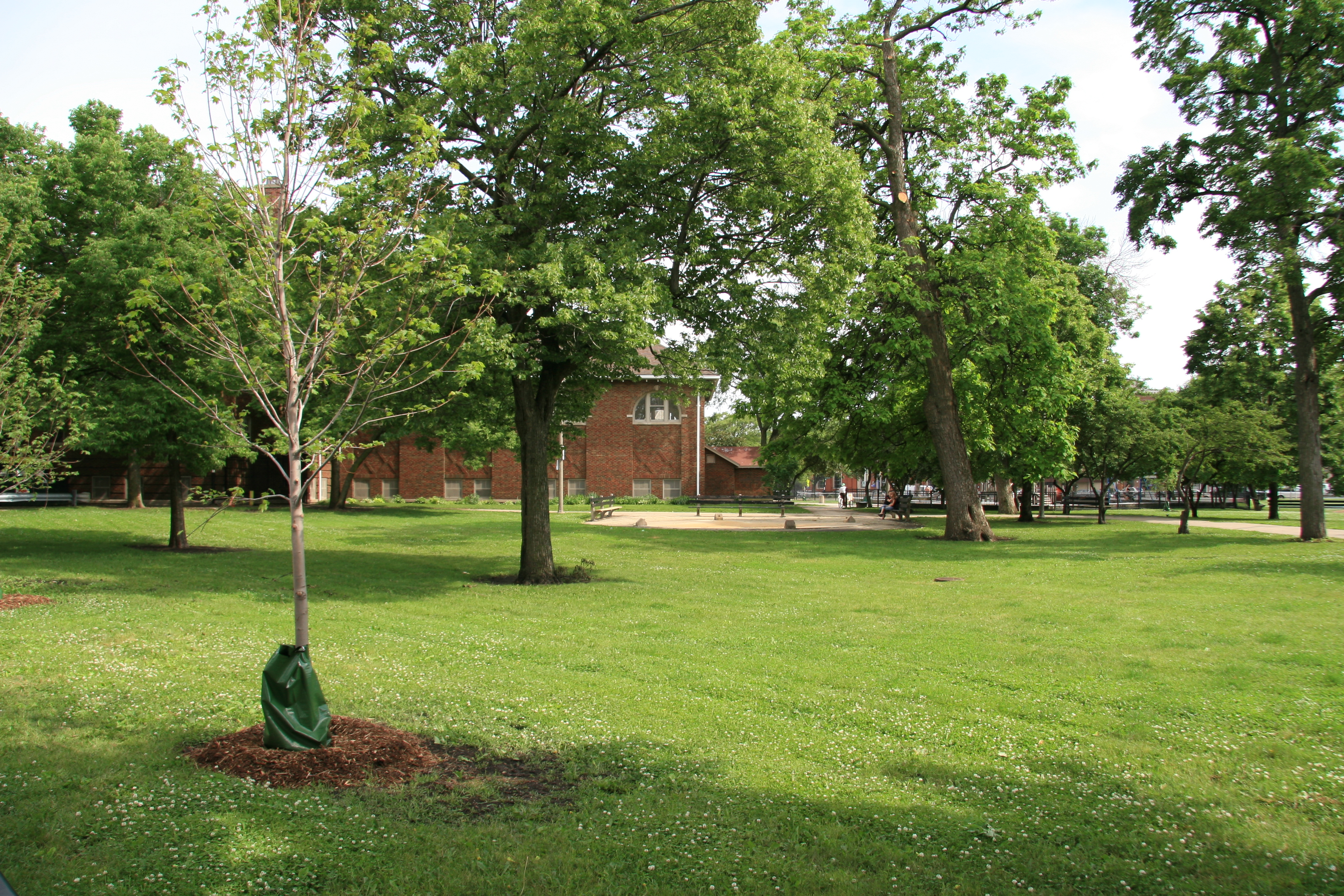
- Jefferson Memorial Park with a view of the fieldhouse designed by Clarence Hatzfeld

- Location within Chicago metropolitan area Location within Illinois Location within the United States
- Location: 4822 N. Long Avenue Chicago, Illinois
- Coordinates: 41°58′6″N 87°45′49″W
- Area: 7.2 acres (2.9 ha)
- Built: 1921
- MPS: Chicago Park District MPS
- NRHP reference No.: 06000679
- Added to NRHP: August 8, 2006

Jefferson Memorial Park is a 7-acre (2.8 ha) park in the Jefferson Park community area of Chicago, Illinois on the National Register of Historic Places.

== History ==
Thomas Jefferson Memorial Park is named in honor of the drafter of the Declaration of Independence and third president of the United States Thomas Jefferson. The park was long referred to as simply Jefferson Park until the park received the memorial park designation in 1999 to distinguish it from a second park of the same name. This Jefferson Park was the creation of the Jefferson Park District, one of 22 park commissions consolidated into the Chicago Park District in 1934. The Jefferson Park District was established in 1920 to provide neighborhood parks for the rapidly developing northwest side of Chicago. Located on the site of the former Esdohr farm, land acquisition for the park began in 1921 and continued through 1929 when most of the park had been landscaped.

In 1930, the park district constructed an athletic field and a fieldhouse designed by Clarence Hatzfeld whose architectural firm of Hatzfeld and Knox would later design many of the Prairie and Craftsman-style bungalows in the nearby Villa District by historic St. Wenceslaus Church. The brick fieldhouse is graced with several historic paintings, including an anonymous portrait of Thomas Jefferson, a depiction of a Viking ship replica by artist Emil Biorn, and Columbus Sighting Land by L. Caracciolo.
