= Cumberland station (Metra) =

Commuter rail station in Des Plaines, Illinois

Cumberland

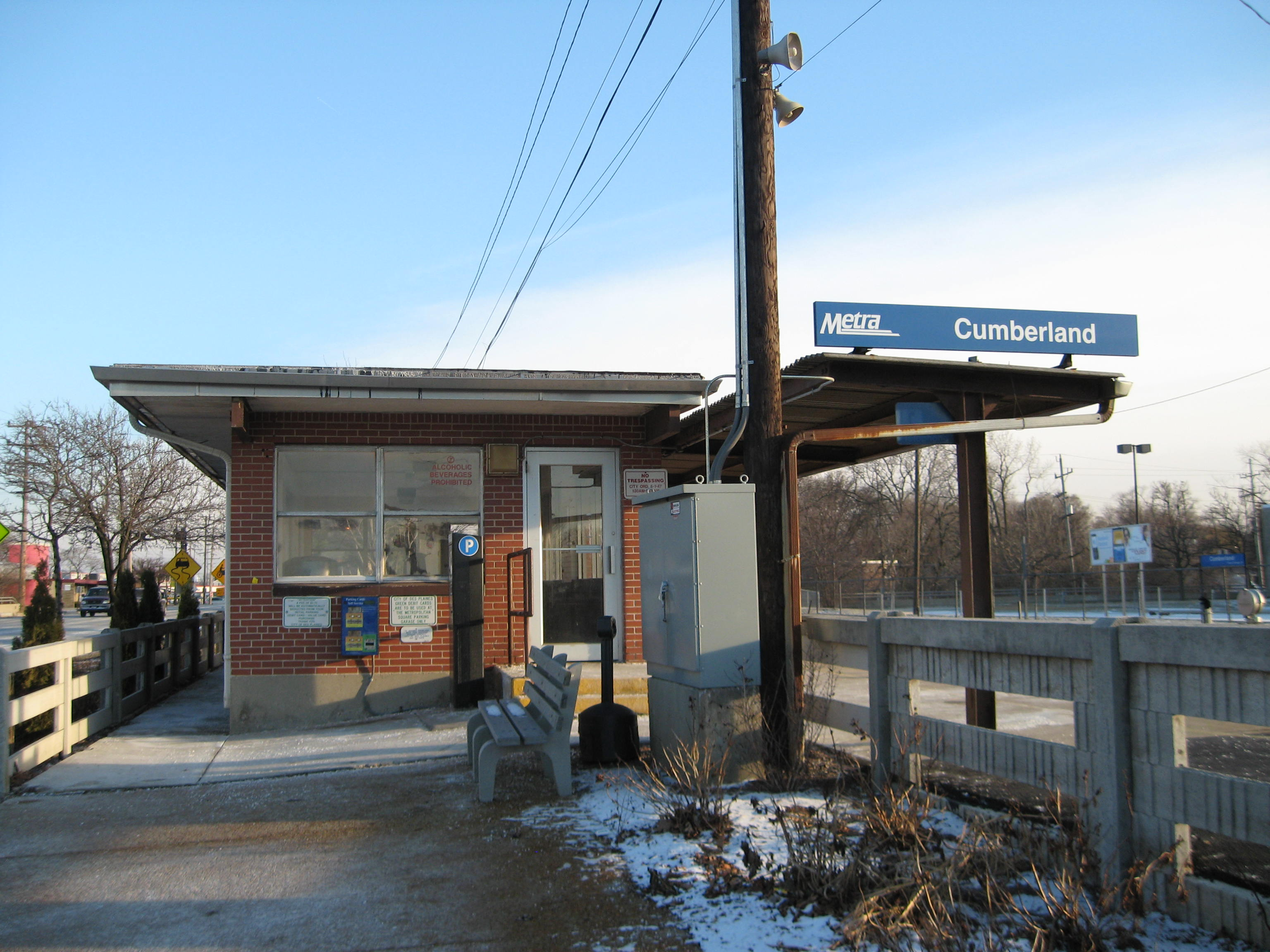

General information
- Location: 475 East Northwest Highway; Des Plaines, Illinois 60016
- Coordinates: 42.0524°N 87.9122°W
- Owner: Union Pacific
- Platforms: 1 side platform, 1 island platform
- Tracks: 3
- Connections: Pace Bus

Construction
- Parking: Yes
- Accessible: Yes

Other information
- Fare zone: 3

History
- Opened: 1967

Passengers
- 2018: 442 (average weekday) ▼2.9%
- Rank: 109 out of 236

Services
Preceding station	Metra	Following station
Mount Prospect toward Harvard or McHenry	Union Pacific Northwest	Des Plaines toward Ogilvie TC
Former services
Preceding station	Chicago and North Western Railway	Following station
Mount Prospect toward Crystal Lake	Wisconsin Division	Des Plaines toward Chicago
Track layout
Location

Cumberland station is one of two commuter railroad stations on Metra's Union Pacific Northwest Line in the city of Des Plaines, Illinois. It is officially located at 475 East Northwest Highway (US 14), and lies 18.2 miles (29.3 km) from Ogilvie Transportation Center in Chicago. In Metra's zone-based fare system, Cumberland is in zone 3. As of 2018, Cumberland is the 109th busiest of the 236 non-downtown stations in the Metra system, with an average of 442 weekday boardings.

As of May 30, 2023, Cumberland is served by 60 trains (30 in each direction) on weekdays, by 31 trains (16 inbound, 15 outbound) on Saturdays, and by 19 trains (nine inbound, 10 outbound) on Sundays.

While Metra gives the address as 475 East Northwest Highway, the main parking area is across the tracks and is only accessible from East Golf Road between a Union Pacific freight line crossing, and the intersection of Wolf and Seeger Roads, where East Golf Road turns under both the UP-NW Line and Northwest Highway. Along Northwest Highway itself, there is some parking along the eastbound lane between the State Street-Cornell Avenue intersection and the station house west of the bridge over East Golf Road.

Southeast of this station, the Union Pacific Northwest Line passes through Deval Tower, a three-way junction with the Canadian National Railway's Waukesha Subdivision (used by Metra's North Central Service) and the Union Pacific's "New Line" to Milwaukee.

== Pace Bus connections ==
- 208 Golf Road
- 221 Wolf Road (weekdays only)
- 234 Wheeling/Des Plaines (weekdays only)
