= Harvard Subdivision =

Railway line

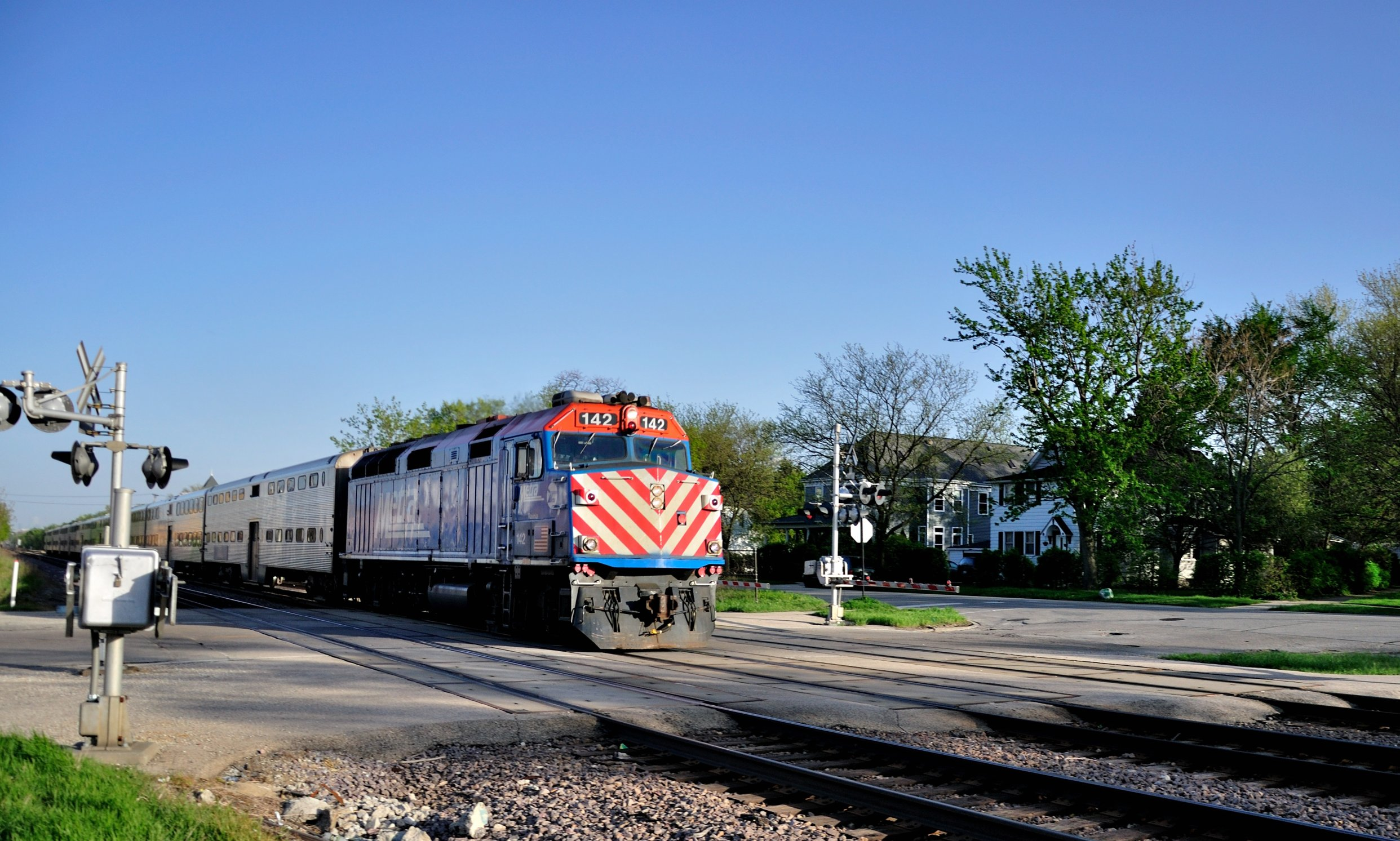
- A Metra commuter train in Norwood Park, Chicago on the triple-tracked portion of the line

Overview
- Owner: Union Pacific Railroad
- Locale: Illinois, Wisconsin

Service
- Type: Freight rail Commuter rail

Technical
- Line length: 102 mi (164 km)
- Number of tracks: 1-3
- Track gauge: 4 ft 8 1/2 in (1,435 mm) standard gauge

The Harvard Subdivision is a 102-mile (164 km) railway line which runs from Chicago, Illinois to Evansville, Wisconsin. It is owned by the Union Pacific Railroad, and it actively hosts both freight traffic and Metra's Union Pacific Northwest Line commuter rail service. The line previously belonged to the Chicago and North Western Railway.

== History ==
The Harvard Subdivision was built to connect Chicago, Illinois to Madison, Wisconsin for commuter service between the C&NW's North Western Station and Madison station (Chicago and North Western Railway). The line ended in Evansville, Wisconsin and became the C&NW Madison Subdivision, hosting passenger service to Sparta, Wisconsin. The Madison subdivision's trackage between Elroy, Wisconsin and Sparta, Wisconsin was abandoned in 1965, with the last passenger train running to Sparta, Wisconsin 1960.

A small portion of the line from Evansville, Wisconsin to Brooklyn, Wisconsin was ripped up after the line was downgraded in the 1980s, the section of the C&NW Madison Subdivision left in-tact is now owned and operated by the Wisconsin and Southern Railroad between Brooklyn, Wisconsin and Reedsburg, Wisconsin.

Between 2019 and 2020, the Harvard subdivision received fresh automatic block signaling between Harvard, Illinois and Janesville, Wisconsin.

In August 2023, CHS Inc. pursued the idea of a new $800 Million soybean crushing facility in Evansville, Wisconsin parallel to the existing grain elevator actively served by the Union Pacific. After 2 years of delay, it was announced in October 2025 that construction will commence in Summer 2026.

In the present day, the Harvard subdivision primarily hosts Metra's Union Pacific Northwest Line commuter rail service, while still seeing some freight traffic. The primarily freight railyard for the Harvard Subdivision is in southeast Janesville, Wisconsin, the interchange point for the Wisconsin and Southern Railroad is also in Janesville, Wisconsin.

== Route ==
The subdivision originates at Ogilvie Transportation Center and is quad-tracked from there to CY Tower, just south of Clybourn station, where it meets the Kenosha Subdivision. It is triple-tracked from CY Tower to Barrington station, and then double-tracked through Harvard, the furthest extent of commuter service. At Crystal Lake Junction, just south of Crystal Lake station, the Harvard Subdivision meets the McHenry Subdivision, which also carries commuter rail traffic. Northwest of Harvard the subdivision is single-tracked.
