= Norwood Park station =

Commuter rail station in Chicago, Illinois

Norwood Park

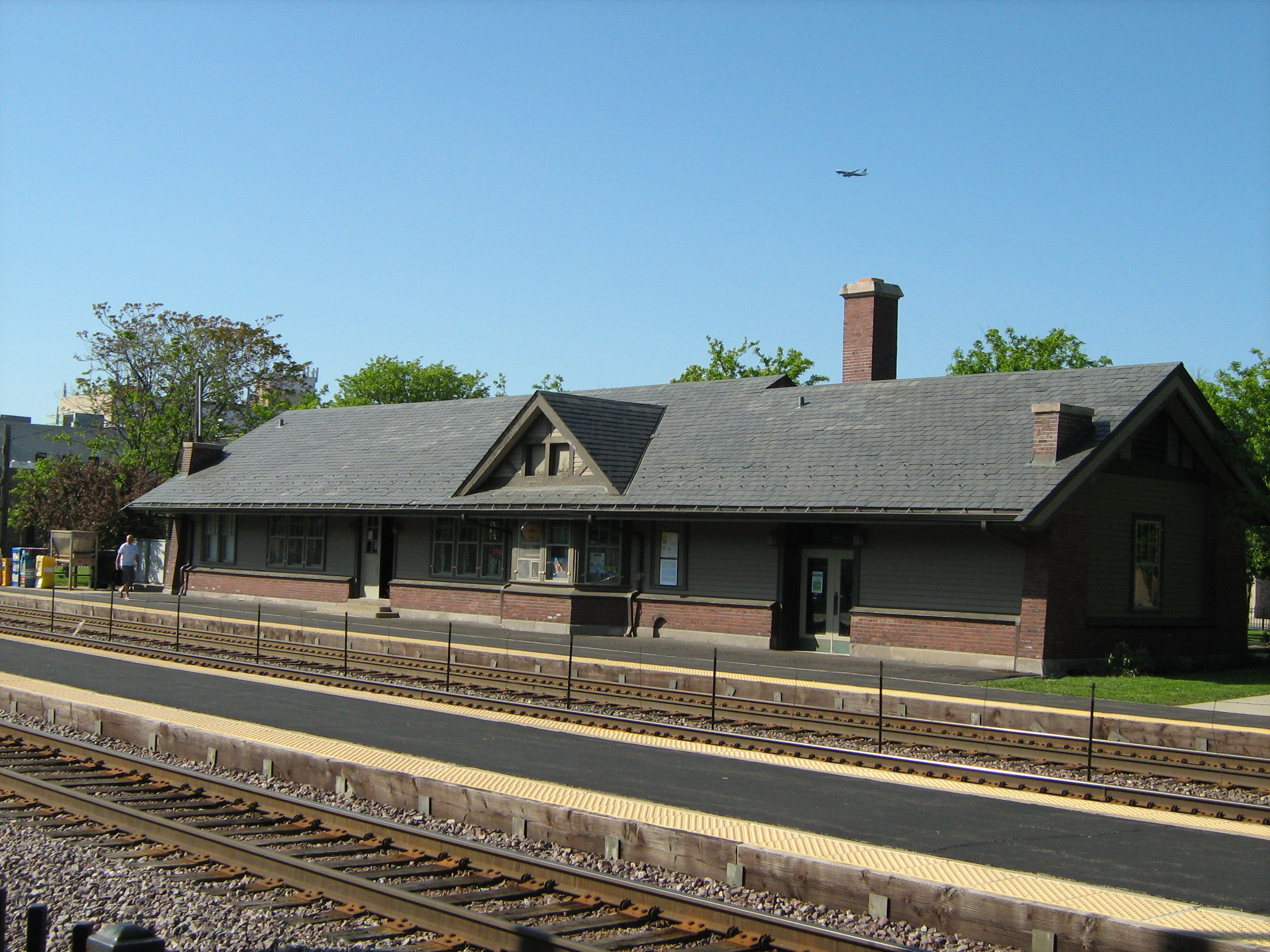
- Norwood Park Metra Station

General information
- Location: 6088 North Northwest Highway; Norwood Park, Chicago, Illinois 60631
- Coordinates: 41.9918°N 87.7989°W
- Owner: Metra
- Platforms: 1 side platform 1 island platform
- Tracks: 3
- Connections: CTA Buses

Construction
- Parking: Street-side
- Accessible: Yes

Other information
- Fare zone: 2

History
- Opened: 1907
- Rebuilt: 1999

Passengers
- 2018: 365 (average weekday) ▲1.7%
- Rank: 131 out of 236

Services
Preceding station	Metra	Following station
Edison Park toward Harvard or McHenry	Union Pacific Northwest	Gladstone Park weekday limited toward Ogilvie TC
Former services
Preceding station	Chicago and North Western Railway	Following station
Edison Park toward Crystal Lake	Wisconsin Division	Gladstone Park toward Chicago
- Chicago and North Western Railroad Depot(a.k.a.; Norwood Park Railroad Depot)
- U.S. National Register of Historic Places
- Interactive map of Chicago and North Western Railroad Depot(a.k.a.; Norwood Park Railroad Depot)
- Location: Chicago, Illinois, USA
- Coordinates: 41.9918°N 87.7989°W
- Built: 1907
- Architect: Charles Sumner Frost & Alfred Hoyt Granger
- Architectural style: Late 19th And Early 20th Century American Movements, Bungalow/Craftsman
- NRHP reference No.: 01000081
- Added to NRHP: 2001
Track layout
Location

Norwood Park station is a historic commuter railroad station along the Union Pacific Northwest Line in the Norwood Park neighborhood of Chicago, Illinois. It is officially located on 6088 North Northwest Highway, but also runs parallel to Avondale Avenue near Raven Street. In Metra's zone-based fare system, Norwood Park is in zone 2. As of 2018, Norwood Park is the 131st busiest of Metra's 236 non-downtown stations, with an average of 365 weekday boardings.

As of May 30, 2023, Norwood Park is served by 50 trains (25 in each direction) on weekdays, by 31 trains (16 inbound, 15 outbound) on Saturdays, and by 19 trains (nine inbound, 10 outbound) on Sundays.

Norwood Park station was originally built as the "Chicago and North Western Railroad Depot" in 1907. As shown on Metra's official website, the station house looks like a private residential home. In fact, the station itself is privately owned, which is one reason it opens at 5:00 A.M. and has no specific closing time.

The Norwood Park Chamber of Commerce & Industry carried out a major renovation project of the station in 1999. In 2001, it was listed on the National Register of Historic Places.

== CTA Bus Connections ==
- 68 Northwest Highway
