= Union Pacific Northwest Line =

Commuter rail line in Chicago, Illinois, US

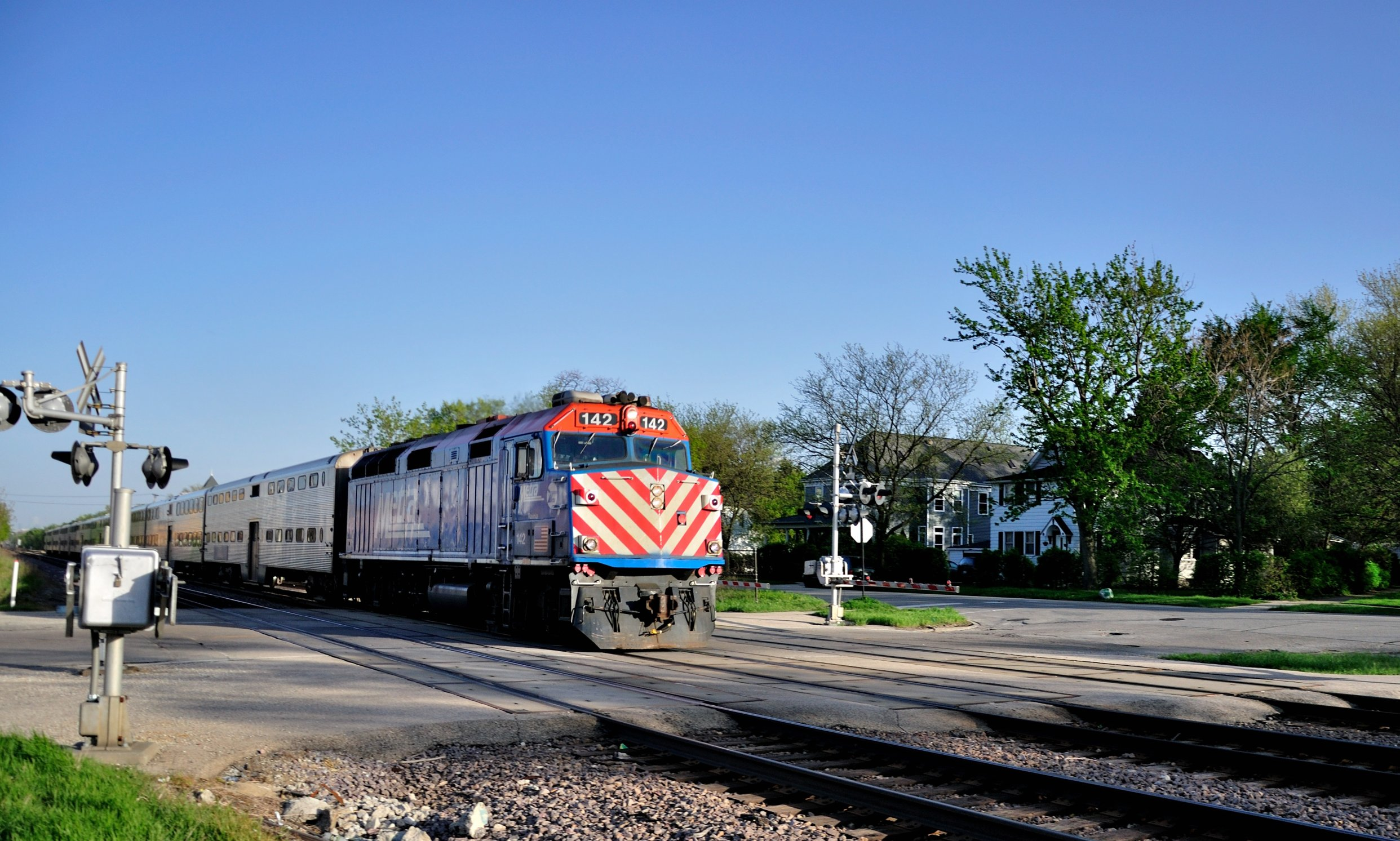
- A Union Pacific Northwest Line train led by an EMD F40PH in the Norwood Park neighborhood of Chicago, Illinois

Overview
- Service type: Commuter rail
- Locale: Cook and McHenry counties, Illinois
- Current operator: Metra
- Former operator: Union Pacific Railroad
- Ridership: 38,600 (Avg. Weekday 2014); 18,800 (Avg. Weekend 2014)
- Annual ridership: 5,721,102 (2025)
- Website: metra.com/train-lines/up-nw

Route
- Termini: Ogilvie Transportation Center; Harvard, McHenry
- Stops: 23 total (22 to Harvard, 20 to McHenry)
- Distance travelled: 50.6 miles (81.4 km) (to McHenry); 63.1 miles (101.5 km) (to Harvard)
- Lines used: Harvard Subdivision; McHenry Subdivision

Technical
- Track gauge: 4 ft 8 1/2 in (1,435 mm) standard gauge
- Track owner: Union Pacific Railroad
Route map
Union Pacific Northwest Line highlighted in yellow
Key
- Mileage source All stations are accessible except Clybourn and Gladstone Park.

The Union Pacific Northwest Line (UP-NW) is a commuter rail line operated by Metra in the Chicago metropolitan area. The line runs from Ogilvie Transportation Center in downtown Chicago to Harvard, Illinois. However, most trains terminate in Crystal Lake, Illinois. A branch line to McHenry, Illinois operates during weekday rush hours in the peak direction. Since May 2025, the service is operated directly by Metra. Previously, it was operated by the Union Pacific Railroad (UP) under a purchase-of-service agreement. UP continues to own the tracks and manage dispatching as part of its Harvard and McHenry Subdivisions.

The line was historically owned and operated by the Chicago & North Western Railway (C&NW), until it merged with UP in 1995. While Metra does not refer to any of its lines by colors, the timetable accents for the UP-NW are bright "Viking Yellow," honoring the C&NW's Viking passenger train.

Overall, this is Metra's longest route and one of three routes with branches (the others being the Rock Island District and Metra Electric District). The line is Metra's second-busiest with an average of 38,600 boardings on a weekday. It is second only to the BNSF Line.

== Service ==
As of February 16, 2024, Metra operates 78 trains (39 in each direction) on the line on weekdays. Of these, 14 inbound trains originate from Harvard, three from McHenry, 13 from Crystal Lake, four from Barrington, one from Palatine, and four from Des Plaines. Five outbound trains terminate at Des Plaines, three at Palatine, three at Barrington, 12 at Crystal Lake, three at McHenry, and 13 at Harvard.

Metra operates 34 trains (17 in each direction) on the line on Saturdays. Of these, 10 inbound trains originate from Harvard, five from Crystal Lake, one from Barrington, and one from Arlington Heights. Two outbound trains terminate at Barrington, five at Crystal Lake, and 10 at Harvard.

Metra operates 21 trains (10 inbound, 11 outbound) on the line on Sundays. Of these, seven inbound trains originate from Harvard, two from Crystal Lake, and one from Arlington Heights. Three outbound trains terminate at Crystal Lake and eight terminate at Harvard.

There is no service at Gladstone Park station or on the McHenry branch on weekends or holidays. All other stations are open daily.

The main line is triple-tracked from Clybourn to just southeast of Barrington, with a bidirectional express track, and double tracked from Barrington to Harvard. The McHenry branch is single-tracked. Historically, double track was maintained from Harvard to Baraboo, Wisconsin. A now-gone portion of the Union Pacific Northwest Line diverged at Harvard and passed through Beloit, Wisconsin, and reconnected to the main line at Evansville junction to allow a separate passenger and freight line. Around the time the Beloit line was abandoned, the railroad single-tracked the line from Harvard to Janesville.

All stations along the triple-tracked portion of the line have a side platform serving the inbound track and an island platform serving the express and outbound tracks, the only exception being Irving Park, which only has two side platforms and does not serve trains running through the express track.

Metra has included the possibility of extending the McHenry branch to Johnsburg in their Cost Benefit Analysis report. If this were to happen, the branch would open an infill station in Prairie Grove. Additionally, an infill station would open in Ridgefield between Crystal Lake and Woodstock along the line to Harvard.

Beginning in 2023, the Union Pacific Railroad announced that commuter operations on all three of the Union Pacific lines would be transferred to Metra; the Union Pacific would continue to own and maintain the right-of-way. The transfer was initially expected to occur by Q1 2024; however, it was delayed by a year to May 16, 2025.

Since 2023, Metra has been working on a project to build a new layover rail yard in Woodstock. The new yard will consolidate the operations from the Barrington and Crystal Lake yards. It will have seven storage tracks that will have the capacity of holding 14 train sets along with two equipment storage tracks. The new yard will allow for the expansion of service on the UP-NW. Construction is expected to begin in 2029 with 2031 as a projected completion date, pending funding availability.

== Ridership ==
Between 2014 and 2019, annual ridership declined from 11,609,358 to 10,384,356, an overall decline of 10.6%. Due to the COVID-19 pandemic, ridership dropped to 2,602,403 passengers in 2020. The line's 5,721,102 riders in 2025 made it the second busiest Metra line

== Stations ==
State	County	Zone	Location	Station	Connections and notes
WI	Rock		Evansville	Evansville	Closed 1965
WI	Rock		Janesville	Janesville	Closed
WI	Rock		Clinton	Clinton	Closed 1966
WI	Walworth		Sharon	Sharon	Closed 1966
IL	McHenry	4	Harvard	Harvard	Pace: 808
IL	McHenry	4	Hartland	Hartland	Closed 1984
IL	McHenry	4	Woodstock	Woodstock	Pace: 807, 808
IL	McHenry		Ridgefield	Ridgefield	Closed, proposed new stop
IL	McHenry	4	Crystal Lake	Crystal Lake	Pace: 550, 806, 808
IL	McHenry	4	Crystal Lake	McHenry branch begins/ends	
IL	McHenry	4	Crystal Lake	Pingree Road	
IL	McHenry	4	Cary	Cary	
IL	McHenry	4	Fox River Grove	Fox River Grove	Formerly named Chicago Highlands
IL	Cook	4	Barrington	Barrington	
IL	Cook	4	Palatine	Palatine	
IL	Cook	3	Arlington Heights	Arlington Park	
IL	Cook	3	Arlington Heights	Arlington Heights	
IL	Cook	3	Mount Prospect	Mount Prospect	Pace: 234
IL	Cook	3	Des Plaines	Cumberland	Pace: 208, 221, 234
IL	Cook	3	Des Plaines	Des Plaines	Pace Pulse: ■ Dempster Line; Pace: 208, 209, 226, 230, 234, 250
IL	Cook	2	Park Ridge	Dee Road	Pace: 209, 226, 240
IL	Cook	2	Park Ridge	Park Ridge	Pace: 209, 241, 290; CTA buses: 68
IL	Cook	2	Skokie	Skokie	Skokie branch; Closed December 1, 1958
IL	Cook	2	Lincolnwood	Lincolnwood	Skokie branch; Closed December 1, 1958
IL	Cook	2	Chicago	Sauganash	Skokie branch; Closed December 1, 1958
IL	Cook	2	Chicago	Peterson	Weber branch; Closed December 1, 1958
IL	Cook	2	Chicago	Edison Park	CTA buses: 68
IL	Cook	2	Chicago	Norwood Park	CTA buses: 68
IL	Cook	2	Chicago	Gladstone Park	CTA buses: 68
IL	Cook	2	Chicago	Jefferson Park	Chicago "L": Blue; Pace Pulse: ■ Milwaukee Line; CTA buses: 56 68 81 81W 85 85A 88 91 92; Pace: 225, 226, 270
IL	Cook	2	Chicago	Mayfair	Closed December 1, 1958
IL	Cook	2	Chicago	Kostner	Closed December 1, 1958
IL	Cook	2	Chicago	Irving Park	Chicago "L": Blue (at Irving Park); CTA buses: 53 N53 54A 80
IL	Cook		Chicago	Parkview	Closed December 1, 1958
IL	Cook		Chicago	Avondale	Closed December 1, 1958
IL	Cook		Chicago	Maplewood	Closed December 1, 1958
IL	Cook	2	Chicago	Clybourn	Metra: Union Pacific North; CTA buses: 9 X9 73
IL	Cook	1	Chicago	Ogilvie; Transportation; Center	Metra: Union Pacific North, Union Pacific West; Chicago "L": Green Pink (at Clinton); CTA buses: J14 19 56 60 120 124 125 126 128 130 157 192

=== McHenry branch ===
The branch, which formerly had service north to Williams Bay, branches off from the main line north of Pingree Road.

State	County	Zone	Location	Station	Connections and notes
WI	Walworth				
WI	Walworth		Williams Bay	Williams Bay	Closed 1966
WI	Walworth		Lake Geneva	Lake Geneva	Closed 1975
WI	Walworth		Pell Lake	Pell Lake	Closed 1975
WI	Walworth		Genoa City	Genoa City	Closed 1975
IL	McHenry	4			
IL	McHenry	4	Richmond	Richmond	Closed 1980
IL	McHenry	4	Ringwood	Ringwood	Closed 1980
IL	McHenry	4	Johnsburg	Johnsburg	Proposed new stop
IL	McHenry	4	McHenry	McHenry	Pace: 806, 807
IL	McHenry	4	Prairie Grove	Prairie Grove	Proposed new stop
