= Irving Park station (CTA Blue Line) =

Chicago "L" station

Irving Park 4000N 4100W
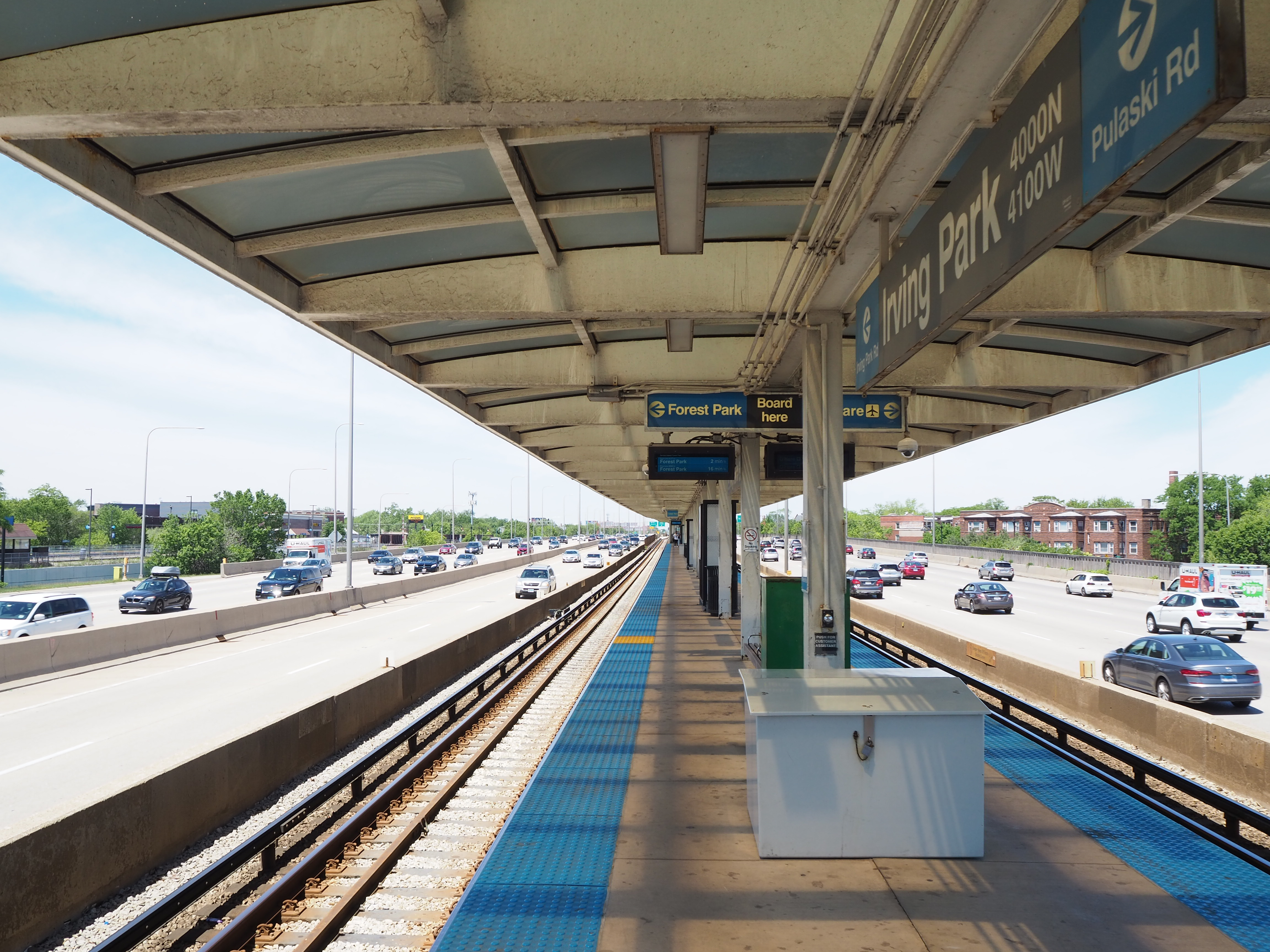

General information
- Location: 4131 West Irving Park Road; Chicago, Illinois 60641
- Coordinates: 41.952964°N 87.729263°W
- Owner: Chicago Transit Authority
- Line: O'Hare Branch
- Platforms: 1 Island platform
- Tracks: 2
- Connections: at Irving Park; CTA Buses

Construction
- Structure type: Expressway median
- Cycle facilities: Yes
- Accessible: No

History
- Opened: February 1, 1970; 56 years ago
- Rebuilt: 2016; 10 years ago

Passengers
- 2025: 876,492 ▲7.9%

Services
Preceding station	Chicago "L"	Following station
Montrose toward O'Hare	Blue Line	Addison toward Forest Park
Track layout
Location

The Irving Park station house is located under the Kennedy Expressway

Irving Park is an 'L' station on the CTA's Blue Line. The station is located in the median of the Kennedy Expressway in the Irving Park neighborhood, though it draws its name from its cross street. Irving Park is one of two stations on the Blue Line that stops in an expressway median where the entrance is below the platform; Rosemont is the other, specifically beneath the westbound lane of the Kennedy Expressway. The station opened in 1970 as a part of the Kennedy extension of the Milwaukee Elevated from Logan Square to Jefferson Park.

== History ==
The Irving Park station opened as part of the Kennedy extension of the Blue Line to Jefferson Park in 1970. Built as other nearby stations, according to the plans of architects Skidmore, Owings & Merrill, Irving Park is different; it does not pass under the crossing of the Kennedy Expressway and streets but it spans up to Irving Park Road and Pulaski Road. This means that the main entrance is located under the tracks and not above as in other stations located in the median of the Kennedy Expressway. The layout of the station is also distinguished by the length of its banks, it can accommodate 10-car trains as opposed to the 8 of the other stations in the plan. This is explained by the presence of an auxiliary entrance on Pulaski Road.

On February 10, 1998, the Chicago Transit Authority temporarily closed the entrance on Pulaski Road. It reopened in October 1998 with the agent replaced with an ATM.

== Bus and rail connections ==
Metra

- Union Pacific Northwest (at Irving Park)

CTA

- 53 Pulaski (Owl Service)
- 54A North Cicero/Skokie Blvd (weekday rush hours only)
- 80 Irving Park
