= Park Ridge station (Illinois) =

Commuter rail station in Park Ridge, Illinois

Park Ridge

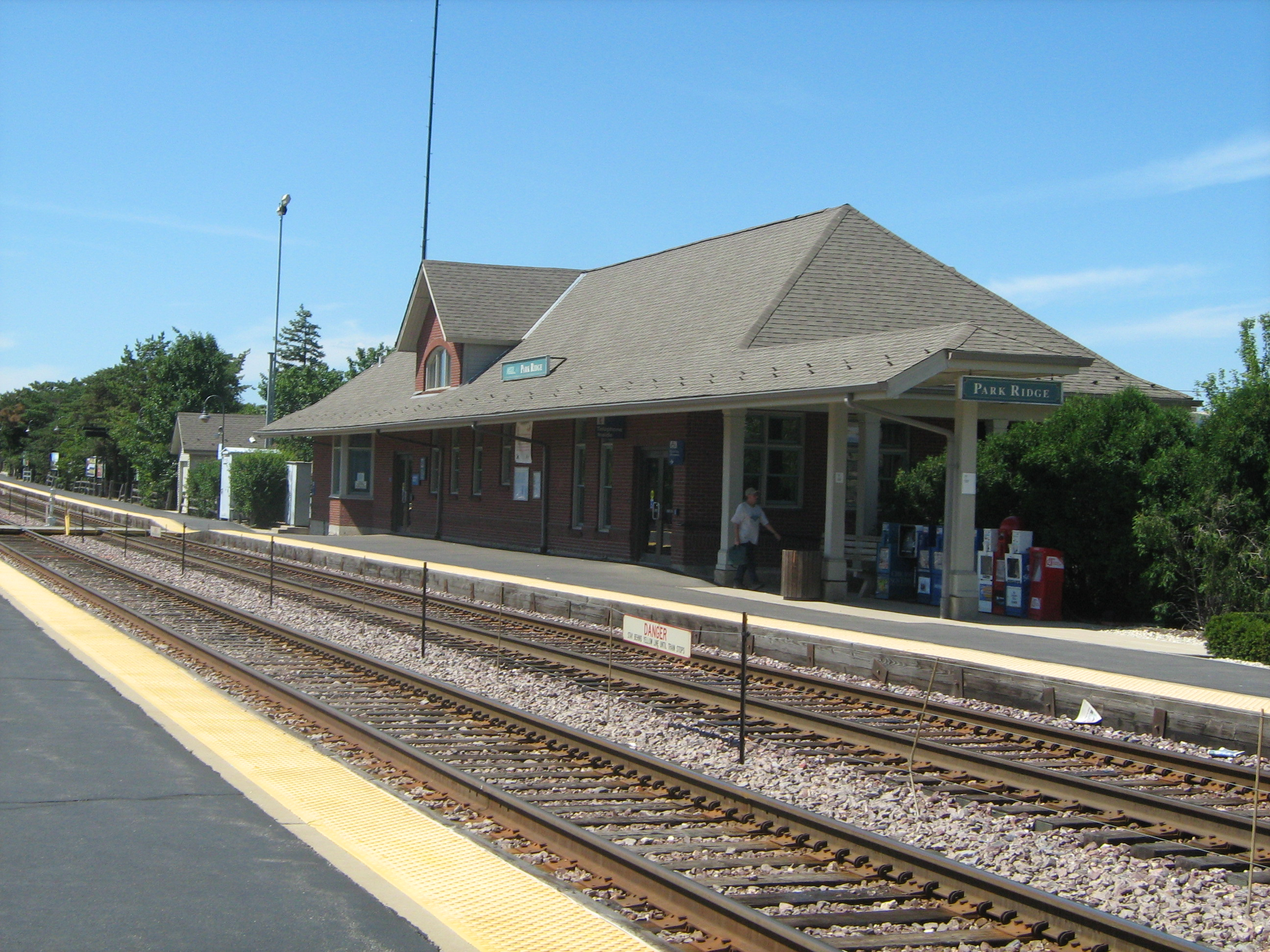

General information
- Location: 100 South Summit Avenue; Park Ridge, Illinois 60068
- Coordinates: 42.0102°N 87.8316°W
- Owner: Metra
- Platforms: 1 Side platform, 1 Island platform
- Tracks: 3
- Connections: Pace Suburban Buses; CTA Buses

Construction
- Parking: Yes
- Accessible: Yes

Other information
- Fare zone: 2

History
- Opened: 1960

Passengers
- 2018: 1,168 (average weekday) ▲12%
- Rank: 33 out of 236

Services
Preceding station	Metra	Following station
Dee Road toward Harvard or McHenry	Union Pacific Northwest	Edison Park toward Ogilvie TC
Former services
Preceding station	Chicago and North Western Railway	Following station
Des Plaines toward Minneapolis	Chicago – Minneapolis via Madison	Jefferson Park toward Chicago
Dee Road toward Crystal Lake	Wisconsin Division	Edison Park toward Chicago
Track layout
Location

Park Ridge is one of two commuter railroad stations on Metra's Union Pacific Northwest Line in the city of Park Ridge, Illinois. It is officially located at 100 South Summit Avenue, and lies 13.1 miles (21.1 km) from the Ogilvie Transportation Center in Chicago. In Metra's zone-based fare system, Park Ridge is in zone 2. As of 2018, Park Ridge is the 33rd busiest of Metra's 236 non-downtown stations, with an average of 1,168 weekday boardings.

As of May 30, 2023, Park Ridge is served by 50 trains (25 in each direction) on weekdays, by 31 trains (16 inbound, 15 outbound) on Saturdays, and by 19 trains (nine inbound, 10 outbound) on Sundays.

Parking is available on both sides of the tracks. On the north side, on-street parking can be found along Summit Avenue and Busse Highway, and a parking lot can be found on the southwest corner of Summit and Touhy Avenues. On the south side of the tracks, the parking areas are much further away from the station south of Main Street. Among these are street-side parking along Garden Avenue beginning halfway between Prospect and Fairview Avenues and halfway between Prairie Avenue and Third Street, one parking lot on the south side of Garden Avenue between Fairview and Prospect Avenues, street-side parking along Prairie Avenue north of Garden Street, which end at parking lots on both sides of Prairie Avenue, and another parking lot next to the one on the east side of Prairie along Fairview Avenue.

Unlike nearby Dee Road station, Park Ridge's main station provides bus connections for both Pace and CTA buses. Park Ridge serves as the northern terminus of CTA's Route 68 Northwest Highway.

== Transportation ==
Buses

CTA

- 68 Northwest Highway

Pace

- 209 Busse Highway (weekdays only)
- 241 Greenwood/Talcott (weekday rush hours only)
- 290 Touhy Avenue
