= Edison Park station =

Commuter rail station in Chicago, Illinois

Edison Park

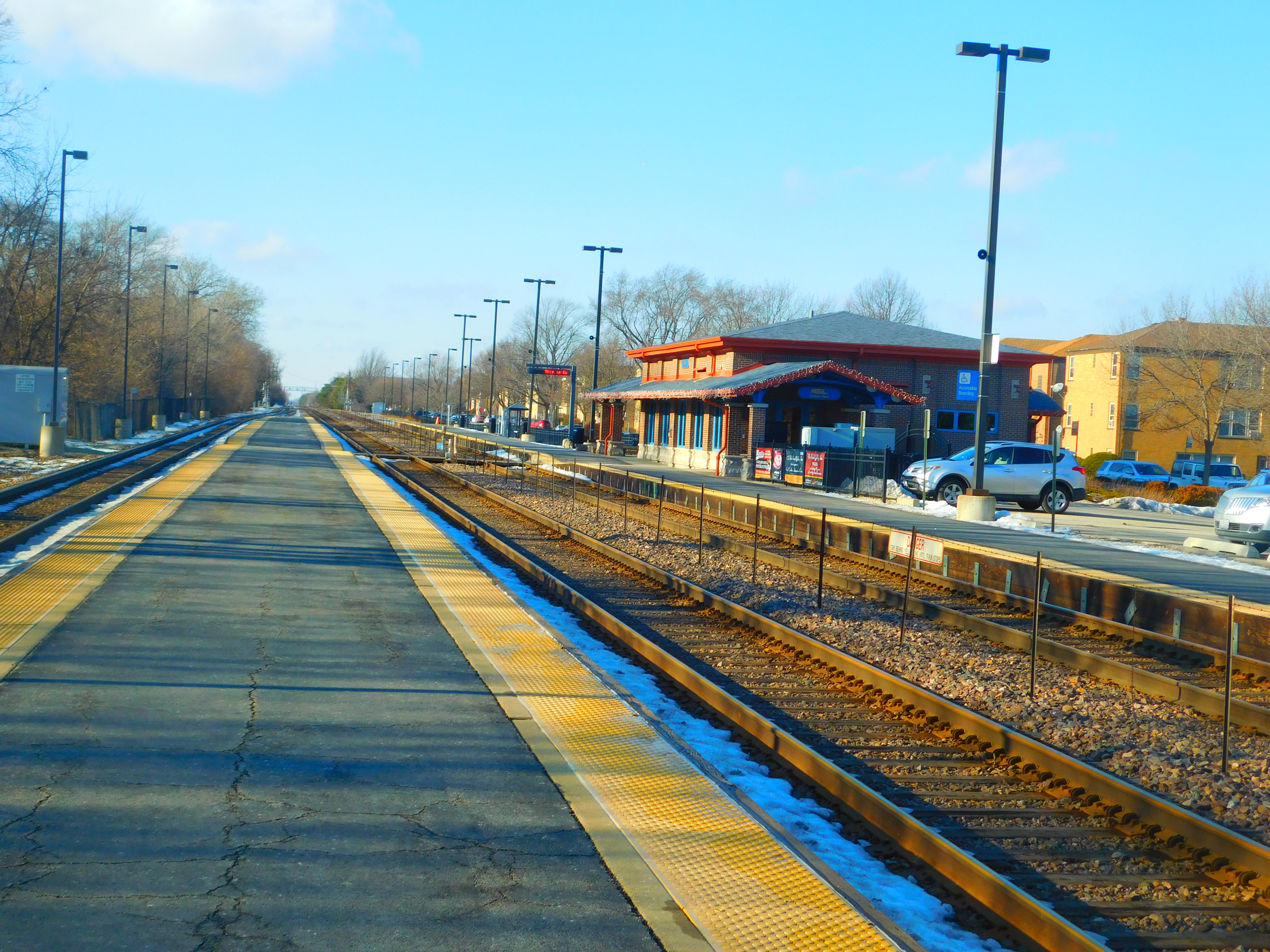
- Edison Park station in January 2016. The new depot is visible on the right.

General information
- Location: 6730 North Olmstead Avenue; Edison Park, Chicago, Illinois 60631
- Coordinates: 42.0025°N 87.8180°W
- Owner: Metra
- Platforms: 1 side platform 1 island platform
- Tracks: 3
- Connections: CTA Buses

Construction
- Parking: Yes (On-street, Vending)
- Accessible: Yes

Other information
- Fare zone: 2

History
- Opened: 1956
- Rebuilt: 2007

Passengers
- 2018: 752 (average weekday) ▲8.4%
- Rank: 69 out of 236

Services
Preceding station	Metra	Following station
Park Ridge toward Harvard or McHenry	Union Pacific Northwest	Norwood Park toward Ogilvie TC
Former services
Preceding station	Chicago and North Western Railway	Following station
Park Ridge toward Crystal Lake	Wisconsin Division	Norwood Park toward Chicago
Track layout
Location

Edison Park is a commuter rail station along Metra's Union Pacific Northwest Line in the Edison Park neighborhood of Chicago, Illinois. It is located at 6730 North Olmstead Avenue across from Monument Park, and lies 11.4 miles (18.3 km) from Ogilvie Transportation Center in Chicago. In Metra's zone-based fare system, Edison Park is in Zone 2. As of 2018, Edison Park is the 69th busiest of Metra's 236 non-downtown stations, with an average of 752 weekday boardings.

As of May 30, 2023, Edison Park is served by 50 trains (25 in each direction) on weekdays, by 31 trains (16 inbound, 15 outbound) on Saturdays, and by 19 trains (nine inbound, 10 outbound) on Sundays.

Edison Park station is the last station outbound along the Union Pacific Northwest Line within Chicago's city limits. It contains both a station house along the tracks and an open shelter in between two of them. Parking is available (with vendors), but only along the tracks on North Olmstead Avenue between Ozark and Olympia Avenues.

== CTA Bus Connections ==
- 68 Northwest Highway
