= Gladstone Park station =

Commuter rail station in Chicago, Illinois

Gladstone Park

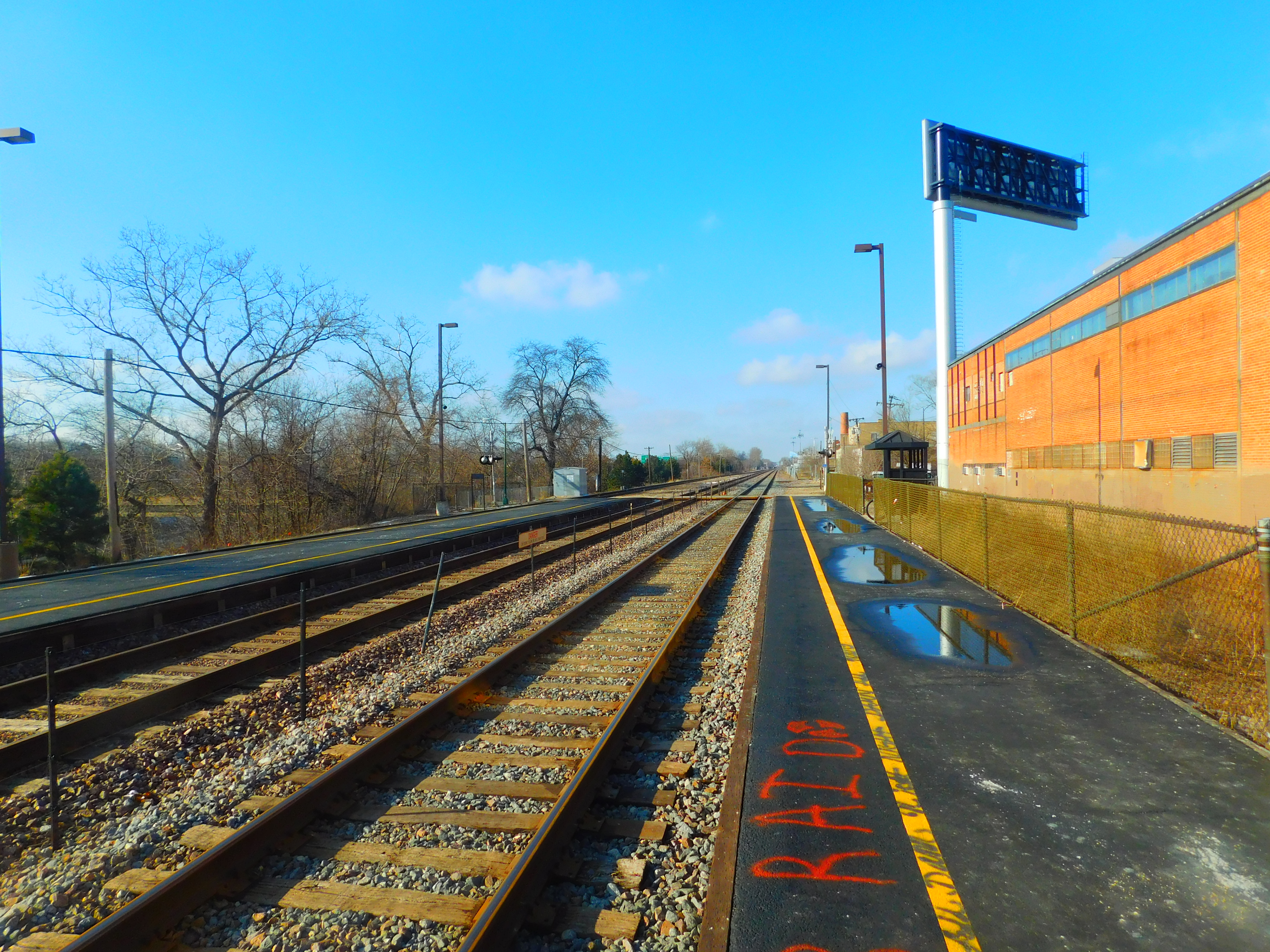
- Gladstone Park station in January 2016.

General information
- Location: 5500 North Austin Avenue; Gladstone Park, Chicago, Illinois 60646
- Coordinates: 41.9798°N 87.7779°W
- Owner: Metra
- Platforms: 1 island platform, 1 side platform
- Tracks: 3 tracks
- Connections: CTA Bus

Construction
- Parking: Street-side
- Accessible: No

Other information
- Fare zone: 2

History
- Opened: 1920

Passengers
- 2018: 180 (average weekday) ▼7.7%
- Rank: 166 out of 236

Services
| Preceding station | Metra | Following station |
|---|---|---|
| Norwood Park toward Harvard or McHenry | Union Pacific Northwest | Jefferson Park toward Ogilvie TC |
Former services
| Preceding station | Chicago and North Western Railway | Following station |
|---|---|---|
| Norwood Park toward Crystal Lake | Wisconsin Division | Jefferson Park toward Chicago |
Track layout
Location

Gladstone Park is a station on Metra's Union Pacific Northwest Line located in the Gladstone Park neighborhood of Chicago, Illinois. Gladstone Park primarily serves rush hour trains and is closed on weekends and holidays. The station is located at 5500 N. Austin Avenue, adjacent to the Kennedy Expressway. Gladstone Park is 10.1 miles (16.3 km) away from the Union Pacific Northwest Line's terminus at Ogilvie Transportation Center. In Metra's zone-based fare system, Gladstone Park is in zone 2. As of 2018, Gladstone Park is the 166th busiest of Metra's 236 non-downtown stations, with an average of 180 weekday boardings.

As of May 30, 2023, Gladstone Park is served by 22 trains (10 inbound, 12 outbound) on weekdays only.

Gladstone Park is located at grade level and is the first station northbound after the Northwest Line descends to grade level. Gladstone Park has two platforms which serve three tracks. There is no ticket agent at Gladstone Park, so tickets must be purchased on board the train or with the Ventra app. A footbridge is located south of the station to allow passengers (and neighboring pedestrians) to cross the Kennedy Expressway. Gladstone Park is one of two stations on the UP-Northwest line that is not ADA-accessible, the other being Clybourn.

== CTA Bus Connections ==
- 68 Northwest Highway
