= Brooklyn, Wisconsin =

Brooklyn is the name of some places in the U.S. state of Wisconsin:

- Brooklyn (village), Wisconsin, a village in Dane and Green Counties
- Brooklyn, Green County, Wisconsin, a town
- Brooklyn, Green Lake County, Wisconsin, a town
- Brooklyn, Washburn County, Wisconsin, a town
