= Des Plaines station =

Commuter rail station in Des Plaines, Illinois

Des Plaines

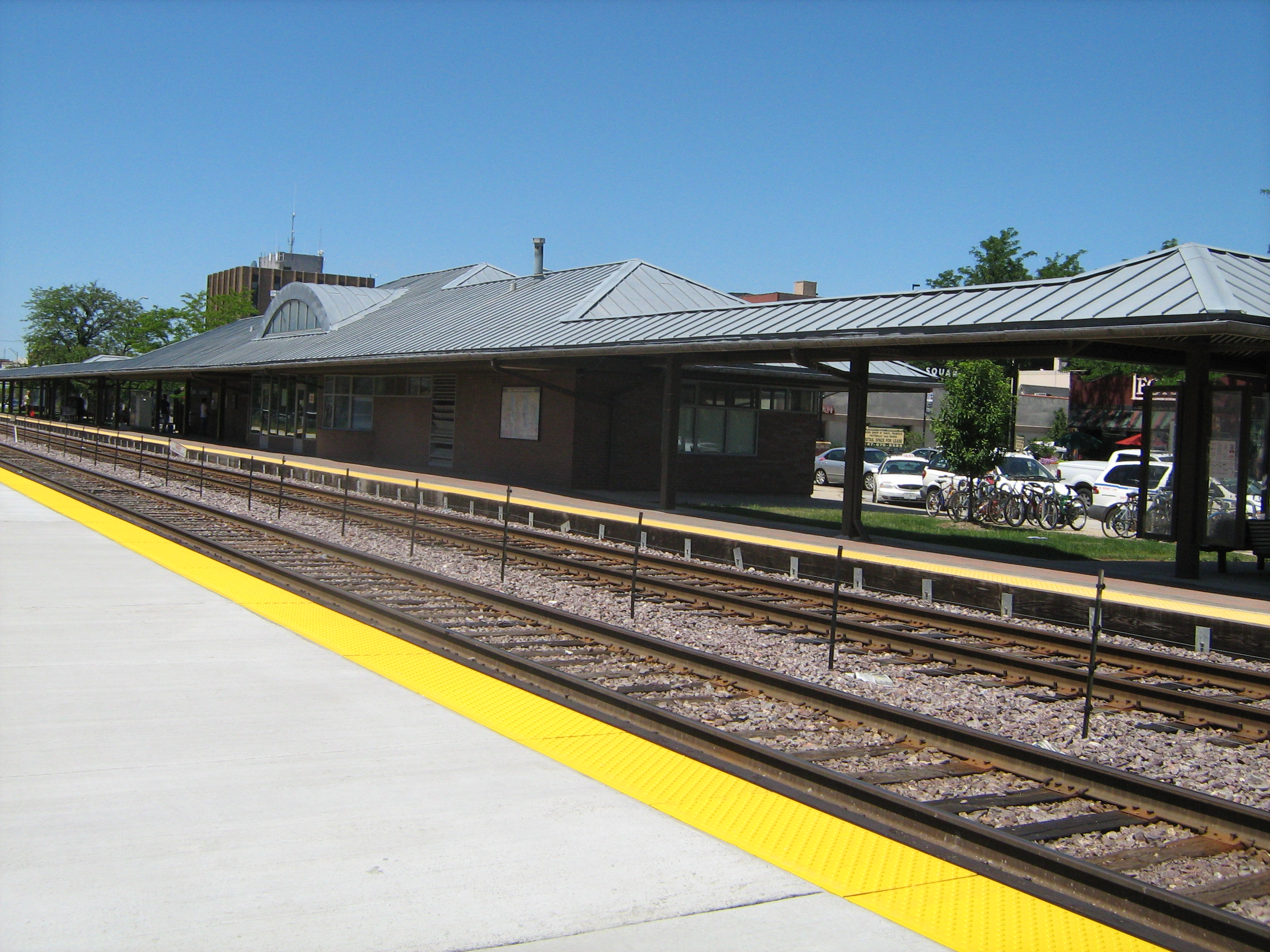

General information
- Location: 1501 Miner Street (US 14); Des Plaines, Illinois 60016
- Coordinates: 42.0410°N 87.8866°W
- Owner: City of Des Plaines
- Platforms: 1 side platform 1 island platform
- Tracks: 3
- Connections: Pace Buses

Construction
- Parking: Yes
- Accessible: Yes

Other information
- Fare zone: 3

History
- Opened: 1848
- Rebuilt: 1915, 1979

Passengers
- 2018: 1,209 (average weekday) ▲5.9%
- Rank: 30 out of 236

Services
| Preceding station | Metra | Following station |
|---|---|---|
| Cumberland toward Harvard or McHenry | Union Pacific Northwest | Dee Road toward Ogilvie TC |
| Preceding station | Pace Pulse | Following station |
| Oakton toward O'Hare MMF | Dempster Line | Dee toward Davis CTA |
Former services
| Preceding station | Chicago and North Western Railway | Following station |
|---|---|---|
| Barrington toward Minneapolis | Chicago – Minneapolis via Madison | Park Ridge toward Chicago |
| Cumberland toward Crystal Lake | Wisconsin Division | Dee Road toward Chicago |
Track layout
Location

Des Plaines is one of two commuter railroad stations on Metra's Union Pacific Northwest Line in Des Plaines, Illinois. The station is located at 1501 Miner Street (US 14), and lies 16.7 miles (26.9 km) from the Ogilvie Transportation Center in Chicago. In Metra's zone-based fare system, Des Plaines is in zone 3. As of 2018, Des Plaines is the 30th busiest of the 236 non-downtown stations in the Metra system, with an average of 1,209 weekday boardings.

Parking is mostly available along the streets on either side of the tracks. Primarily this includes Miner Street between southeast of Perry Street and west of Des Plaines River Road. Other parking areas exist along Ellinwood Street between Pearson Street and Des Plaines River Road east of the Des Plaines Public Library, a lot on Webford Avenue off of Graceland Avenue (southbound US 12 / 45), and on Prairie Avenue east of Pearson Street.

As of May 30, 2023, Des Plaines is served by 69 trains (34 inbound, 35 outbound) on weekdays, by 31 trains (16 inbound, 15 outbound) on Saturdays, and by 19 trains (nine inbound, 10 outbound) on Sundays.

On weekdays, four inbound trains originate, and five outbound trains terminate, at Des Plaines.

== Bus connections ==
Pace

- 208 Golf Road
- 209 Busse Highway (weekdays only)
- 226 Oakton Street (weekdays only)
- 230 South Des Plaines (weekdays only)
- 234 Wheeling/Des Plaines (weekdays only)
- 250 Dempster Street
- Pulse Dempster Line
