= Irving Park station (Metra) =

Commuter rail station in Chicago, Illinois

Irving Park

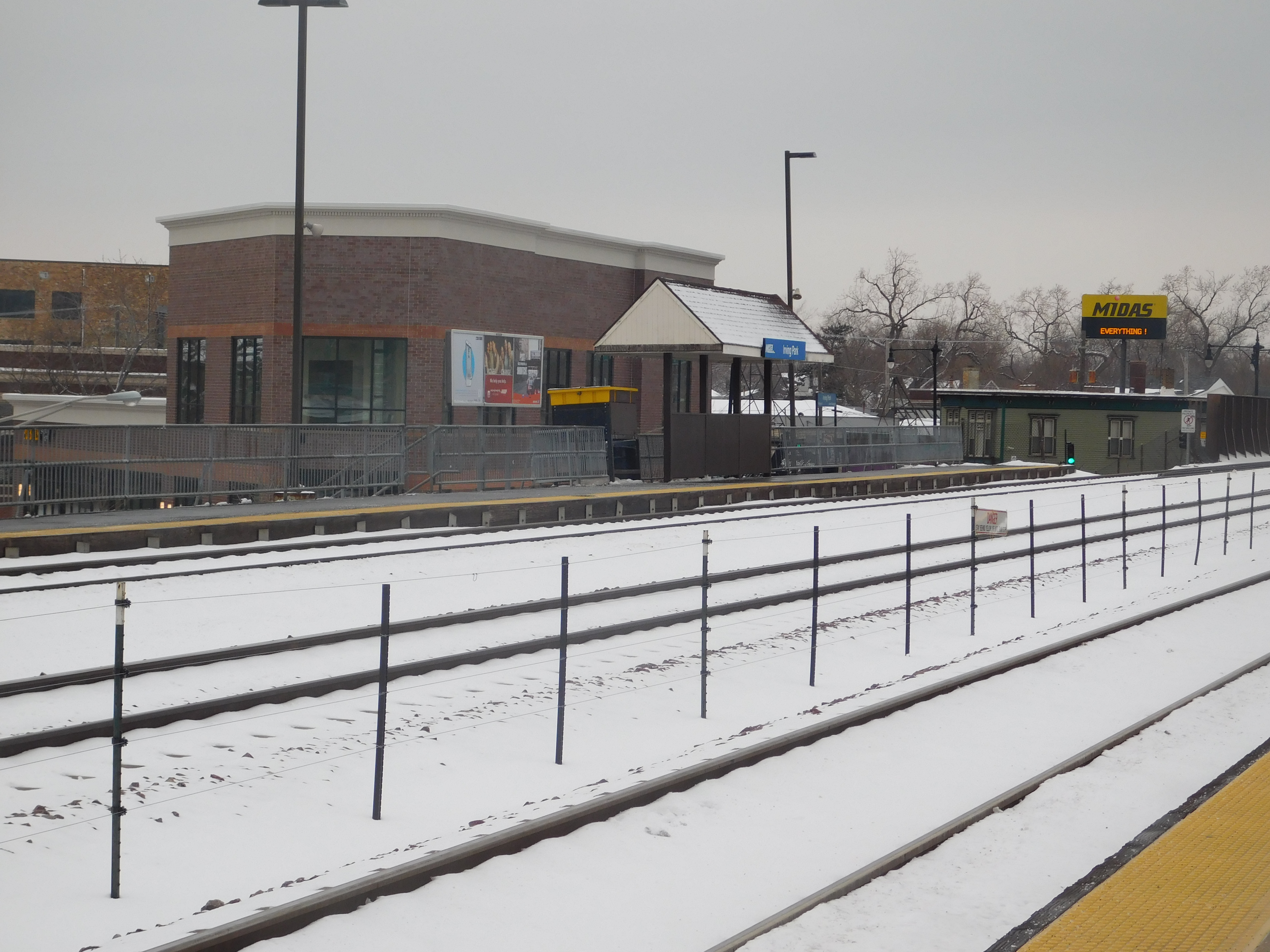
- Irving Park station in December 2015.

General information
- Location: 3931 North Avondale Avenue; Irving Park, Chicago, Illinois 60641
- Coordinates: 41°57′09″N 87°43′48″W
- Owner: Metra
- Platforms: 2 side platforms
- Tracks: 3
- Connections: Blue at Irving Park; CTA Bus

Construction
- Structure type: Elevated
- Accessible: Yes

Other information
- Fare zone: 2

Passengers
- 2018: 439 (average weekday) ▼0.9%
- Rank: 110 out of 236

Services
Preceding station	Metra	Following station
Jefferson Park toward Harvard or McHenry	Union Pacific Northwest	Clybourn toward Ogilvie TC
Former services
Preceding station	Chicago and North Western Railway	Following station
Kostner Avenue toward Crystal Lake	Wisconsin Division	Parkview toward Chicago
Track layout
Location

Irving Park is a railroad station on Metra's Union Pacific Northwest Line located in the Irving Park neighborhood of Chicago, Illinois. The station is elevated on a solid-fill embankment which parallels the Kennedy Expressway. It is located adjacent to a station of the same name on the Blue Line. The station contains two side platforms; the southwest platform serves outbound trains, and the northeast platform serves inbound trains. Trains travelling on the bidirectional middle track are forced to skip the station, as Irving Park is the only station along the triple-tracked portion of the line without an island platform serving the express track. In Metra's zone-based fare system, Irving Park is located in Zone 2. As of 2018, Irving Park is the 110th busiest of Metra's 236 non-downtown stations, with an average of 439 weekday boardings.

Irving Park is 6.9 miles (11.1 km) from Ogilvie Transportation Center and 56.2 miles (90.4 km) from Harvard.

As of May 30, 2023, Irving Park is served by 50 trains (25 in each direction) on weekdays, by 32 trains (all 17 inbound, 15 outbound) on Saturdays, and by 20 trains (all 10 inbound, 10 outbound) on Sundays.

== Bus and rail connections ==
CTA Blue Line

- Irving Park

CTA Buses

- 53 Pulaski (Owl Service)
- 54A North Cicero/Skokie Blvd (weekday rush hours only)
- 80 Irving Park
