= Fox River Grove station =

Commuter rail station in Fox River Grove, Illinois

Fox River Grove

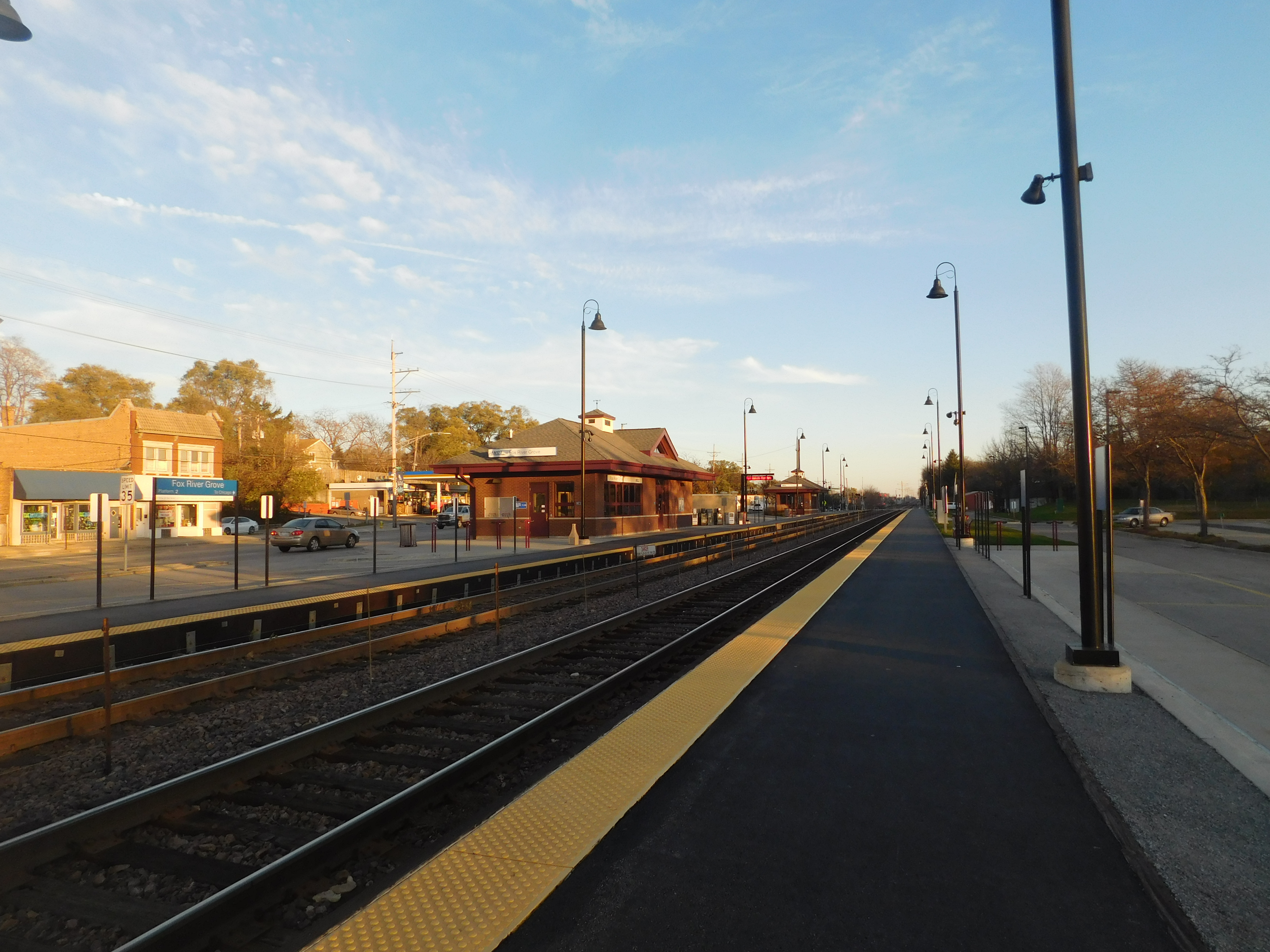
- Fox River Grove station in November 2016.

General information
- Location: 4015 North Northwest Highway; Fox River Grove, Illinois
- Coordinates: 42.1979°N 88.2194°W
- Owner: Metra
- Platforms: 2 side platforms
- Tracks: 2

Construction
- Structure type: Enclosed Shelter
- Parking: Yes
- Accessible: Yes

Other information
- Fare zone: 4

History
- Opened: 1959
- Rebuilt: 2013

Passengers
- 2018: 462 (average weekday) ▲2.4%
- Rank: 104 out of 236

Services
Preceding station	Metra	Following station
Cary toward Harvard or McHenry	Union Pacific Northwest	Barrington toward Ogilvie TC
Former services
Preceding station	Chicago and North Western Railway	Following station
Cary toward Crystal Lake	Wisconsin Division	Barrington toward Chicago
Track layout
Location

Fox River Grove is a commuter railroad station along Metra's Union Pacific Northwest Line in Fox River Grove, Illinois. It is located at 4015 North Northwest Highway (US 14) and Lincoln Avenue, and lies 37.3 miles (60.0 km) from Ogilvie Transportation Center in Chicago, and 25.8 miles (41.5 km) from Harvard. In Metra's zone-based fare system, Fox River Grove is in zone 4. As of 2018, Fox River Grove is the 104th busiest of the 236 non-downtown stations in the Metra system, with an average of 462 weekday boardings.

As of May 30, 2023, Fox River Grove is served by 52 trains (27 inbound, 25 outbound) on weekdays, by 30 trains (15 in each direction) on Saturdays, and by 20 trains (nine inbound, 11 outbound) on Sundays.

The station house is an unstaffed modestly decorative shelter that is open 24 hours per day, 7 days a week. Parking is available on both sides of the tracks and on both sides of Lincoln Avenue. On the north side, there are small on-side parking lots between the tracks and the south side of North Northwest Highway. On the south side, much larger parking lots exist on Lincoln Avenue. The southeast parking lot is also accessible to Algonquin Road.

The station underwent a complete rebuild, that extended platforms to 640 ft, (enough for an 8-car train), 2 new passenger shelters, bathroom facilities, repaved parking lot and improved lighting. The total price was $3.5 million, of which $1.2 million came from Union Pacific. The project was completed in the fall of 2013.

== Accident ==
The Algonquin Road grade crossing at the south end of the station was the site of a collision on October 25, 1995 between an inbound Metra train and a school bus, that resulted in the deaths of seven students. The school bus was caught between the railroad tracks and the intersection with US 14, resulting in the accident.
