= Palatine station =

Commuter rail station in Palatine, Illinois

Palatine

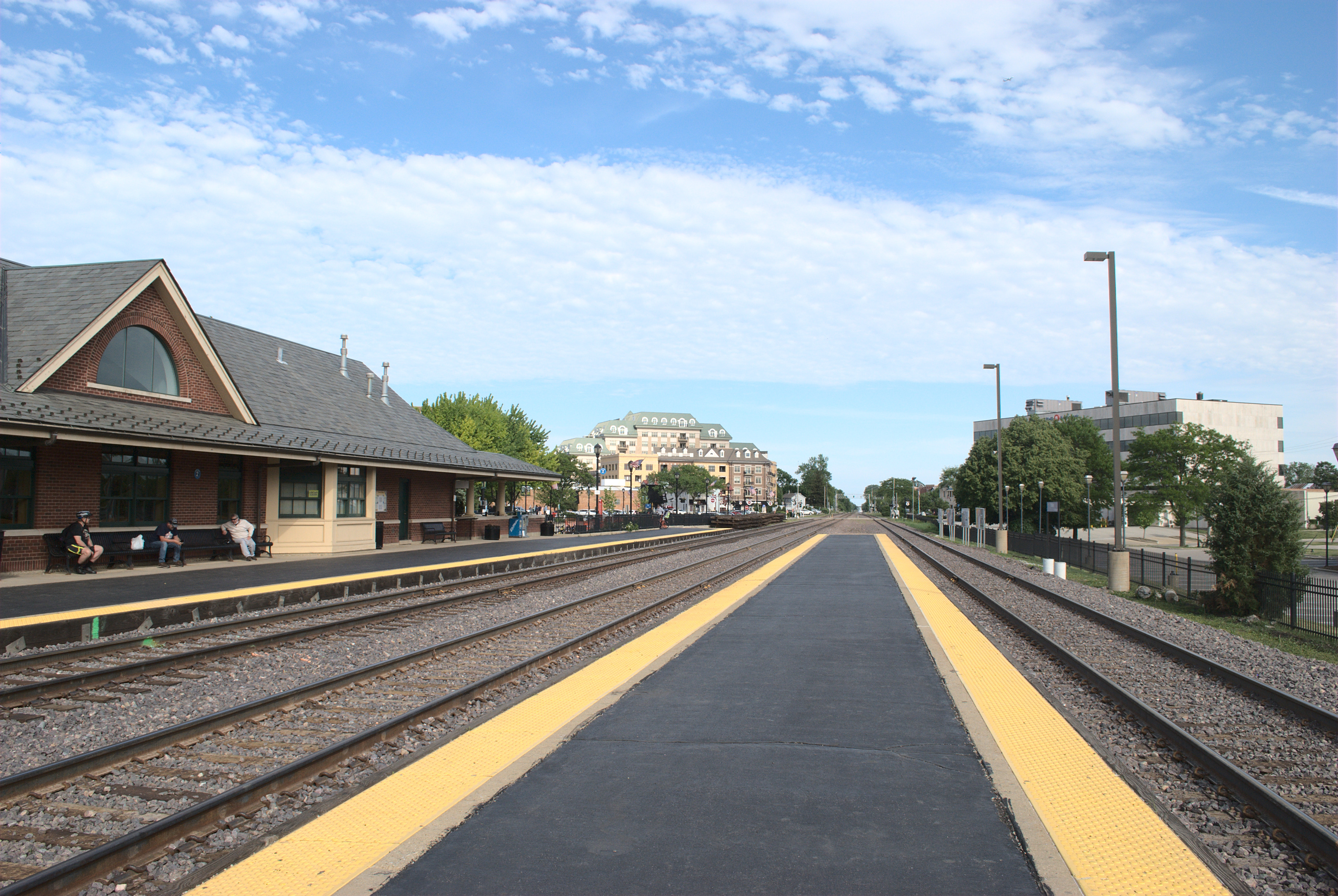
- Palatine station in May 2021.

General information
- Location: 137 West Wood Street; Palatine, Illinois
- Coordinates: 42.1131°N 88.0484°W
- Owner: Village of Palatine
- Platforms: 1 side platform, 1 island platform
- Tracks: 3

Construction
- Parking: Yes
- Accessible: Yes

Other information
- Fare zone: 4

History
- Rebuilt: September 11, 1971; June 25, 2001

Passengers
- October 2025: 1,610 (average weekday)
- Rank: 4 out of 236

Services
Preceding station	Metra	Following station
Barrington toward Harvard or McHenry	Union Pacific Northwest	Arlington Park toward Ogilvie TC
Former services
Preceding station	Chicago and North Western Railway	Following station
Barrington toward Crystal Lake	Wisconsin Division	Arlington Park toward Chicago
Track layout
Location

Palatine station is a commuter railroad station on Metra's Union Pacific Northwest Line in the village of Palatine, Illinois. It is officially located at 137 West Wood Street, however there are parking lots for the station scattered within its vicinity, such as those on Smith Street, Colfax Street, Brockway Street, Slade Street, Railroad Avenue, and Palatine Road. Palatine is the outermost station on the UP-NW line to have three tracks, serviced by two platforms. Inbound trains are serviced by the north side platform nearest the station, with outbound and center track express trains serviced by the south island platform. The station is 26.8 miles (43.1 km) from Ogilvie Transportation Center. Due to the Northwest Line's schedule, it is common to see an outbound train and an inbound train arriving at the same time, as Palatine is the halfway point between Ogilvie and Harvard. In Metra's zone-based fare system, Palatine is located in zone 4. As of 2025, Palatine is the fourth busiest of the 236 non-downtown stations in the Metra system, with an average of 1,610 weekday boardings.

As of May 30, 2023, Palatine is served by 69 trains (35 inbound, 34 outbound) on weekdays, by 33 trains (16 inbound, all 17 outbound) on Saturdays, and by 20 trains (nine inbound, all 11 outbound) on Sundays.

On weekdays, one inbound train originates, and three outbound trains terminate, at Palatine.

== History ==
The original Palatine train station was a Chicago and North Western Railway structure, located between Plum Grove Road and Bothwell Street north of the tracks until 1971 when a station with an attached strip mall and restaurant was built across Smith Street from the present station. Today's station was built by DLK Civic Design, an architecture firm based in Chicago, in 2001. It contains a clock tower and an outdoor coffee shop/café, a pedestrian concourse, and decorative canopies, as well as concession facilities. The original station site has been replaced by a mixed condominium/business complex while the 1971–2001 site was razed to make way for a parking garage, an office building, and a new location for the Durty Nellie's restaurant and nightclub.

Until it was discontinued on February 8, 2010, Pace route 699 offered northbound service to northeast Palatine and southbound service to Harper College, the Woodfield Mall area in Schaumburg, Alexian Brothers Medical Center, and Elk Crossing Shopping Center, the latter two in Elk Grove Village.
