= Arlington Park station =

Commuter rail station in Arlington Heights, Illinois

Arlington Park

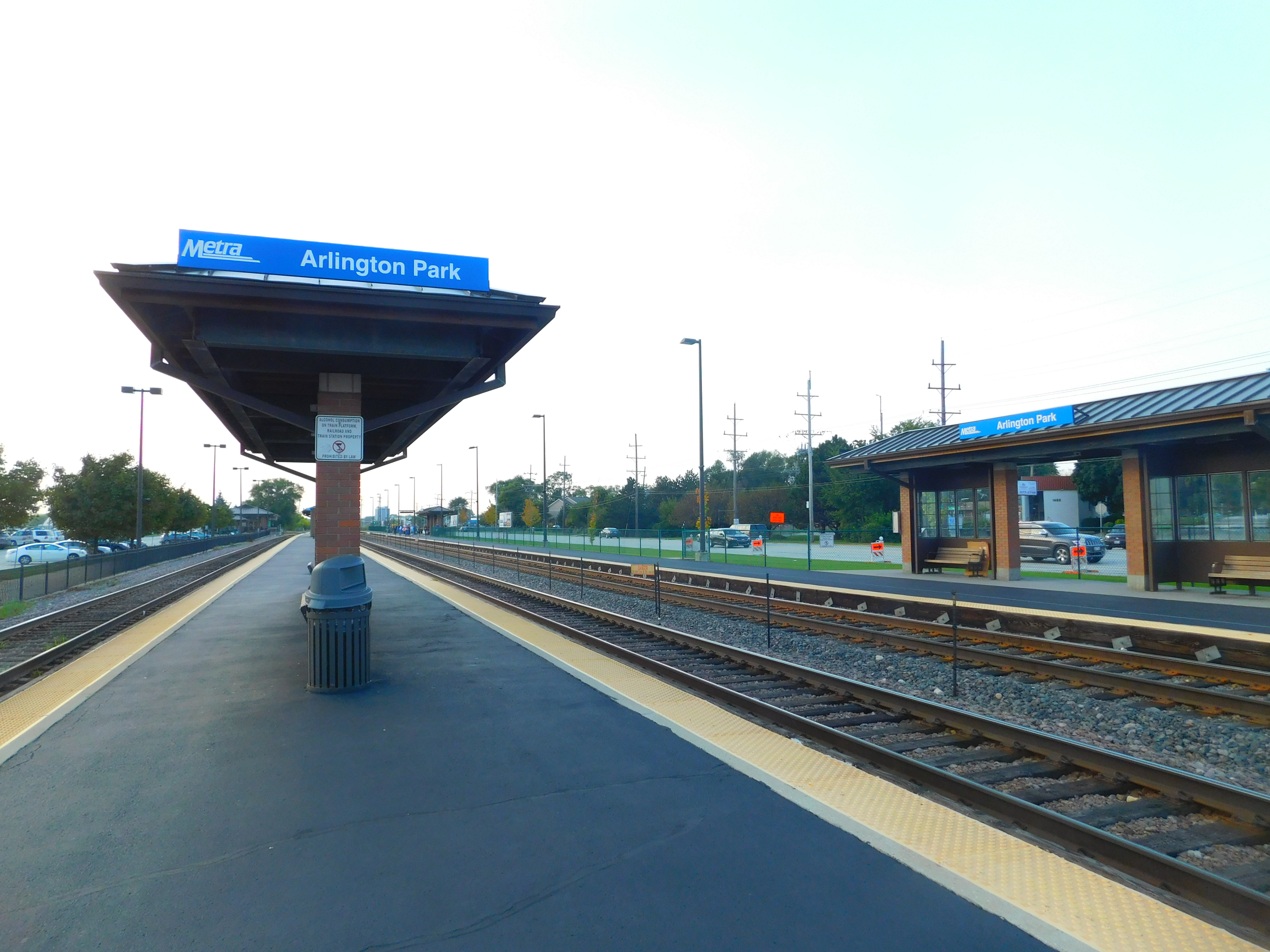

General information
- Location: 2121 West Northwest Highway; Arlington Heights, Illinois
- Coordinates: 42.0953°N 88.0092°W
- Owner: Union Pacific
- Platforms: 1 side platform, 1 island platform
- Tracks: 3

Construction
- Parking: Yes
- Accessible: Yes

Other information
- Fare zone: 3

History
- Opened: 1975

Passengers
- 2018: 1,738 (average weekday) ▲2.4%
- Rank: 15 out of 236

Services
Preceding station	Metra	Following station
Palatine toward Harvard or McHenry	Union Pacific Northwest	Arlington Heights toward Ogilvie TC
Former services
Preceding station	Chicago and North Western Railway	Following station
Palatine toward Crystal Lake	Wisconsin Division	Arlington Heights toward Chicago
Track layout
Location

Arlington Park is one of two commuter railroad stations along Metra's Union Pacific Northwest Line in the village of Arlington Heights, Illinois. The station is located at 2121 West Northwest Highway (US 14) and Wilke Road, within Arlington Park Race Course, and lies 24.4 miles (39.3 km) from Ogilvie Transportation Center in Chicago. In Metra's zone-based fare system, Arlington Park is in zone 3. As of 2018, Arlington Park is the 15th busiest of the 236 non-downtown stations in the Metra system, with an average of 1,738 weekday boardings.

The Arlington Park station was designed originally to serve just the Arlington Park Race Track, but now serves postal employees at the Processing and Distribution Center in Palatine, Illinois as well as residents of southeast Palatine and west Arlington Heights, although a fence blocks most of the access to the station from the Palatine side. Despite its original purpose as a racetrack station, Arlington Park is located along the Union Pacific Northwest Line's main line, rather than a spur or a sidetrack. No bus connections are available.

As of May 30, 2023, Arlington Park is served by 62 trains (31 in each direction) on weekdays, by 33 trains (16 inbound, all 17 outbound) on Saturdays, and by 20 trains (nine inbound, all 11 outbound) on Sundays.

Parking is available within a section of the track complex's property dedicated for Metra commuter parking. As of June 2010, the price was $1.50 per day. The commuter parking lot is operated by Imperial Parking Corporation, operating as Impark. Impark has sometimes drawn criticism over business practices related to parking payment; at this lot in particular, commuters are required to pay a surcharge to use pay-by-phone when the lot's payment machines are out of order.
