= Barrington station =

Commuter rail station in Barrington, Illinois

Barrington

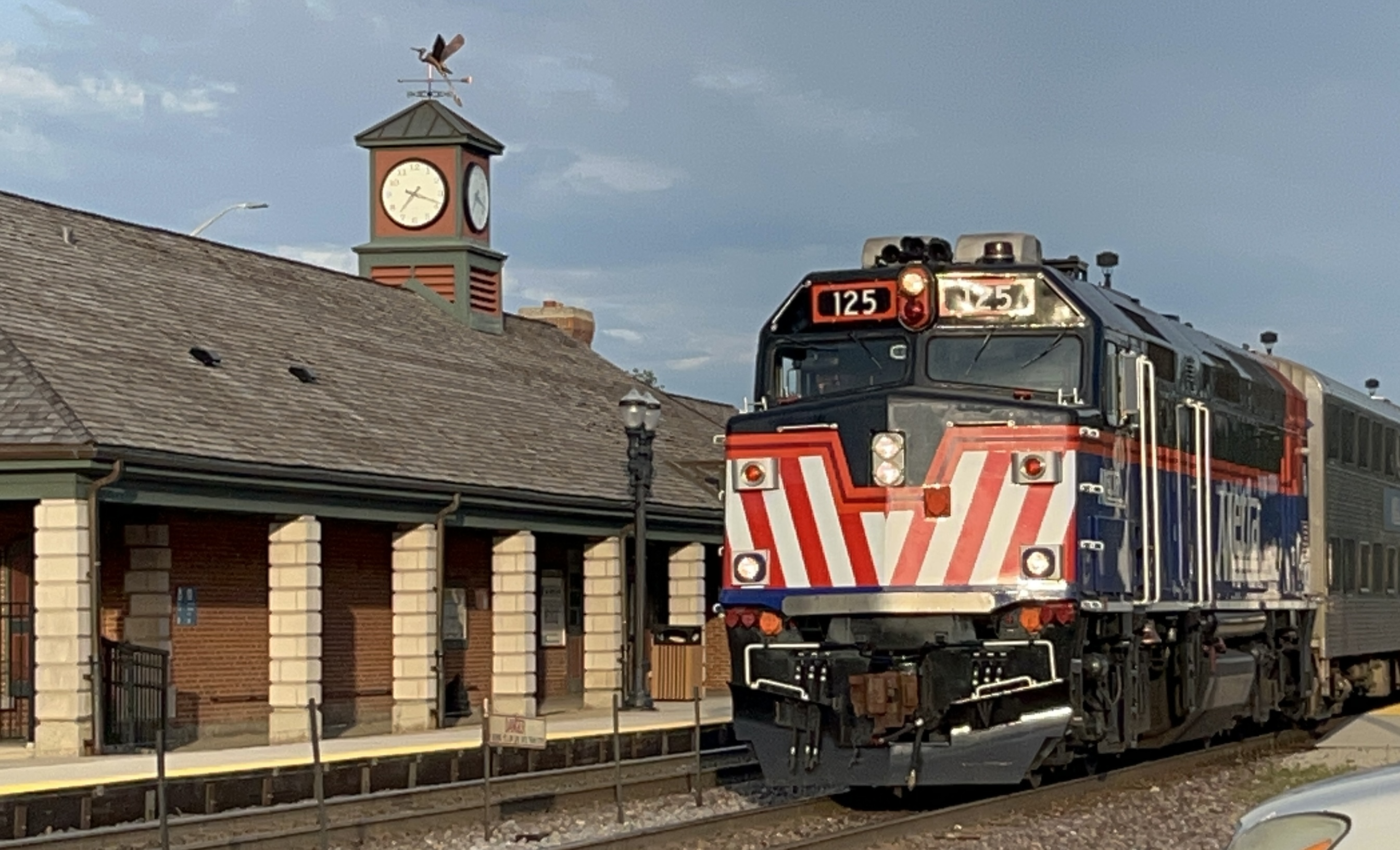
- A Metra train makes a stop at Barrington station

General information
- Location: 201 South Spring Street; Barrington, Illinois
- Coordinates: 42.1529°N 88.1320°W
- Owner: Village of Barrington
- Platforms: 2 side platforms
- Tracks: 2 tracks
- Connections: Pace buses

Construction
- Accessible: Yes

Other information
- Fare zone: 4

History
- Opened: 1977

Passengers
- 2018: 1,725 (average weekday) ▼0.7%
- Rank: 16 out of 236

Services
| Preceding station | Metra | Following station |
|---|---|---|
| Fox River Grove toward Harvard or McHenry | Union Pacific Northwest | Palatine toward Ogilvie TC |
Former services
| Preceding station | Chicago and North Western Railway | Following station |
|---|---|---|
| Crystal Lake toward Minneapolis | Chicago – Minneapolis via Madison | Des Plaines toward Chicago |
| Fox River Grove toward Crystal Lake | Wisconsin Division | Palatine toward Chicago |
Track layout
Location

Barrington is a station on Metra's Union Pacific Northwest Line located in Barrington, Illinois. The station is located at 201 South Spring Street in Barrington, and is 31.9 miles (51.3 km) from Ogilvie Transportation Center, the southern terminus of the Union Pacific Northwest Line. In Metra's zone-based fare structure, Barrington is located in Zone 4. As of 2018, Barrington is the 16th busiest of the 236 non-downtown stations on the Metra system, with an average of 1,725 weekday boardings. Barrington has two tracks and two side platforms; it is the southernmost station on the Union Pacific Northwest Line without a third express track, which begins about a quarter mile southeast of the station near Baker Lake. It is also the last station outbound within Cook County. A station house where tickets may be purchased is on the inbound platform. Parking is available at the station.

As of May 30, 2023, Barrington is served by 65 trains (34 inbound, 31 outbound) on weekdays, by 33 trains (16 inbound, all 17 outbound) on Saturdays, and by 20 trains (nine inbound, all 11 outbound) on Sundays.

On weekdays, four inbound trains originate, and three outbound trains terminate, at Barrington. On Saturdays, one inbound train originates, and two outbound trains terminate, at Barrington.

== History ==
The current station moved from its previous location near the Ice House Mall in 1977, in order to reduce the amount of time traffic on Main Street would need to wait for trains to pass through. The old station had six staff across three shifts, whilst the new station had two staff and two shifts until 1995, when it reduced to just one staff member.
