= Cary, Illinois =

Cary, Illinois Cary-Grove
- Village
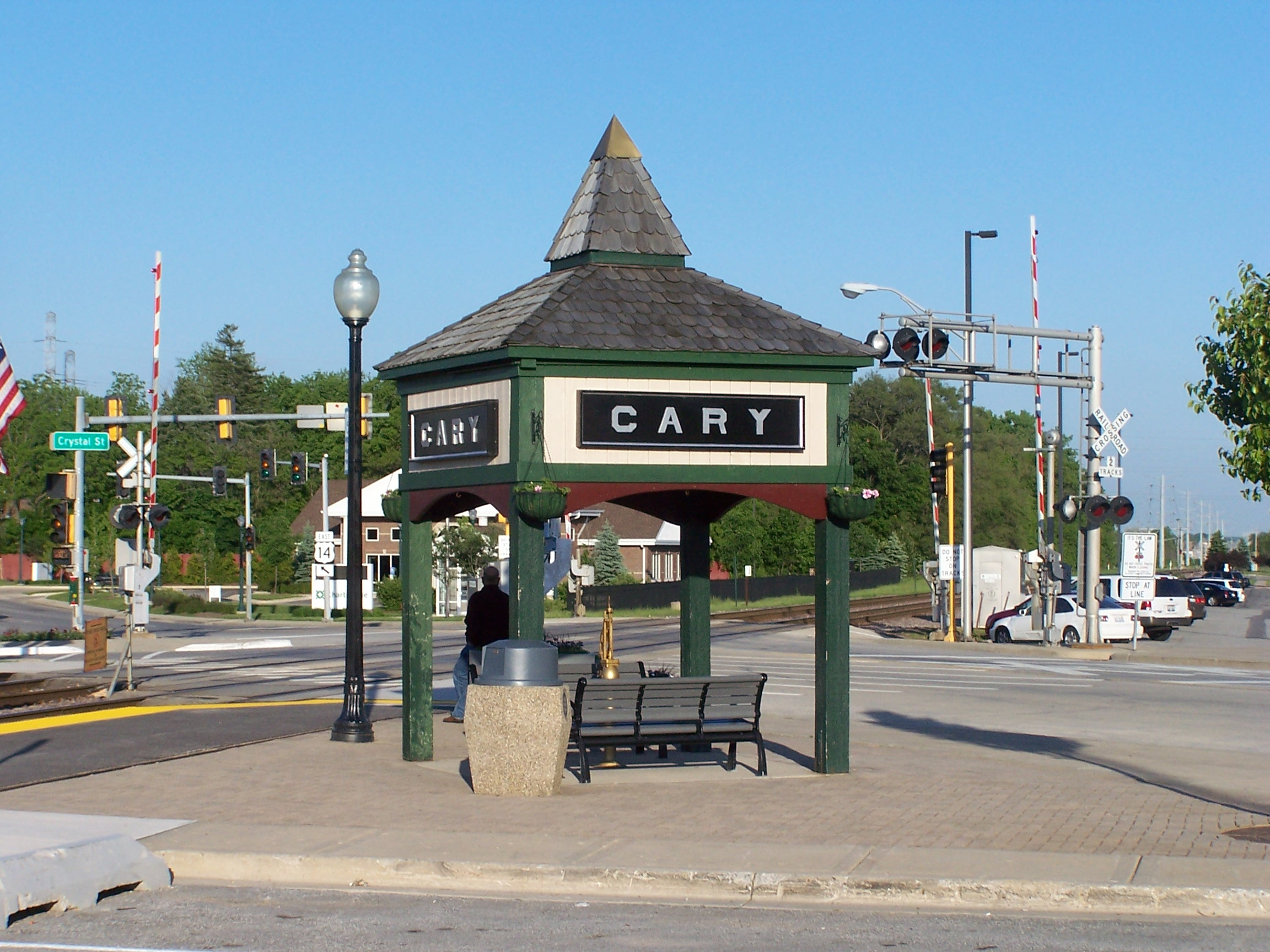
- Cary sign near the train station

- Seal

- Location of Cary in McHenry County, Illinois.
- Coordinates: 42°12′36″N 88°15′24″W
- Country: United States
- State: Illinois
- County: McHenry
- Townships: Algonquin, Cuba
- Founded: 1833
- Founder: William Dennison Cary

Government
  - Type: Non-Home-Rule under Mayor/Trustee

Area
  - Total: 6.60 sq mi (17.10 km^{2})
  - Land: 6.53 sq mi (16.91 km^{2})
  - Water: 0.073 sq mi (0.19 km^{2})
- Elevation: 820 ft (250 m)

Population (2020)
  - Total: 17,826
  - Density: 2,730.8/sq mi (1,054.37/km^{2})
- Time zone: UTC-6 (CST)
  - Summer (DST): UTC-5 (CDT)
- ZIP code: 60013
- Area codes: 847, 224
- FIPS code: 17-11592
- GNIS feature ID: 2397566
- Website: www.caryillinois.com

Cary is a village located in Algonquin Township, McHenry County, Illinois, and Cuba Township, Lake County, Illinois, United States. Per the 2020 census, the population was 17,826.

== History ==
In 1841, William Dennison Cary purchased 82 acres (33 ha) for $1.25 an acre at the location of the current town and built a farm. In 1856, Cary included a train station for the Illinois & Wisconsin Railway which connected Cary to Chicago and Janesville. The site was approved and a post office was added with the designation "Cary Station." The community around Cary Station was incorporated in 1893 as Cary, Illinois.

Early farmers saw this new railway as an opportunity. The economy relied heavily on selling produce, mainly pickles, and the farmers utilized the railway to conduct business with more industrialized cities such as St. Louis and Chicago. The success of this transportation enterprise helped transform Cary into the suburban community it is today. People traveled by rail and most commerce became dependent on the railroad.

In the 1950s, highway transportation overtook rail as the primary means of moving people and goods. Northwest Highway (U.S. 14) parallels the railroad right-of-way, which has been the Union Pacific Northwest Metra line since the Union Pacific merged with the Chicago & North Western in 1995.

== Geography ==
According to the 2010 census, Cary has a total area of 6.358 square miles (16.47 km^{2}), of which 6.27 square miles (16.24 km^{2}) (or 98.62%) is land and 0.088 square miles (0.23 km^{2}) (or 1.38%) is water. It is located on the Fox River.

== Demographics ==
Historical population
Census	Pop.	Note	%±
1880	161		—
1900	398		—
1910	679		70.6%
1920	463		−31.8%
1930	731		57.9%
1940	707		−3.3%
1950	943		33.4%
1960	2,530		168.3%
1970	4,358		72.3%
1980	6,640		52.4%
1990	10,043		51.3%
2000	15,531		54.6%
2010	18,271		17.6%
2020	17,826		−2.4%
U.S. Decennial Census; 2010 2020

=== Racial and ethnic composition ===
Cary village, Illinois – Racial and ethnic composition Note: the US Census treats Hispanic/Latino as an ethnic category. This table excludes Latinos from the racial categories and assigns them to a separate category. Hispanics/Latinos may be of any race.
Race / Ethnicity (NH = Non-Hispanic)	Pop 2000	Pop 2010	Pop 2020	% 2000	% 2010	% 2020
White alone (NH)	14,311	15,801	14,417	92.14%	86.48%	80.88%
Black or African American alone (NH)	60	113	134	0.39%	0.62%	0.75%
Native American or Alaska Native alone (NH)	18	10	25	0.12%	0.05%	0.14%
Asian alone (NH)	210	440	516	1.35%	2.41%	2.89%
Pacific Islander alone (NH)	4	2	4	0.03%	0.01%	0.02%
Other race alone (NH)	3	19	52	0.02%	0.10%	0.29%
Mixed race or Multiracial (NH)	82	260	578	0.53%	1.42%	3.24%
Hispanic or Latino (any race)	843	1,626	2,100	5.43%	8.90%	11.78%
Total	15,531	18,271	17,826	100.00%	100.00%	100.00%

=== 2020 census ===
As of the 2020 census, Cary had a population of 17,826. The median age was 40.0 years. About 23.9% of residents were under the age of 18, and 13.3% were age 65 or older. For every 100 females there were 97.5 males, and for every 100 females age 18 and over there were 95.0 males age 18 and over.

About 99.9% of residents lived in urban areas, while 0.1% lived in rural areas.

There were 6,320 households in Cary, of which 36.0% had children under the age of 18 living in them. Of all households, 63.4% were married-couple households, 11.7% were households with a male householder and no spouse or partner present, and 19.9% were households with a female householder and no spouse or partner present. About 18.6% of all households were made up of individuals, and 7.8% had someone living alone who was 65 years of age or older.

There were 6,521 housing units, of which 3.1% were vacant. The homeowner vacancy rate was 0.9%, and the rental vacancy rate was 5.4%.

=== Income and poverty ===
The median income for a household in the village was $100,339, and the median income for a family was $111,065.

== Education ==
Cary is mainly served by Community High School District 155 for high school students, specifically by Cary-Grove High School and Prairie Ridge High School, and School District 26 for elementary and middle school students. Some portions of Cary also are served by Crystal Lake Community Consolidated School District 47 and Community Unit School District 300.

Trinity Oaks Christian Academy, a non-denominational Christian school, is located in Cary, as well as Saints Peter and Paul, a Roman Catholic school and parish.

== Popular culture ==
The interior of the bed and breakfast room that Bill Murray's character stays in, in the 1993 film Groundhog Day, was built in a warehouse in Cary.

Suzanne Evenson of Cary was featured on HGTV's show House Hunters International on December 8, 2010, showcasing her family's move from Cary to Dubai.

Students from the class of 2004 were featured in the MTV show High School Stories. They concocted a senior prank which included launching a boat onto a pond on school property.

In the summer of 2016, Burger King opened its first-ever drive-thru-only restaurant in Cary. It was closed in 2023.

A Cary resident, Chris Rudolph, was a contestant on TLC's "Spouse House," airing in July 2017.

== Transportation ==
U.S. Route 14, locally known as Northwest Highway, passes through Cary between its northwest and southeast borders.

Illinois Route 31 forms part of Cary's western border.

Metra's Union Pacific Northwest Line has a station in Cary and operates daily service to Ogilvie Transportation Center in downtown Chicago.

Lake in the Hills Airport is approximately two miles west of Cary's west border.

== Notable people ==
- Drew Conner, soccer player
- A. J. Raebel, Canadian football player
- Michael Glasder, ski jumper XXIII Olympic Winter Games (raised in Cary)
- Quinn Priester, MLB player, Milwaukee Brewers pitcher, (attended Cary-Grove High School)
- Jimmy John Liautaud, founder of Jimmy John's
- Paul Wertico, jazz drummer and winner of seven Grammy Awards (raised in Cary)
