= Pingree Road station =

Commuter rail station in Crystal Lake, Illinois

Pingree Road

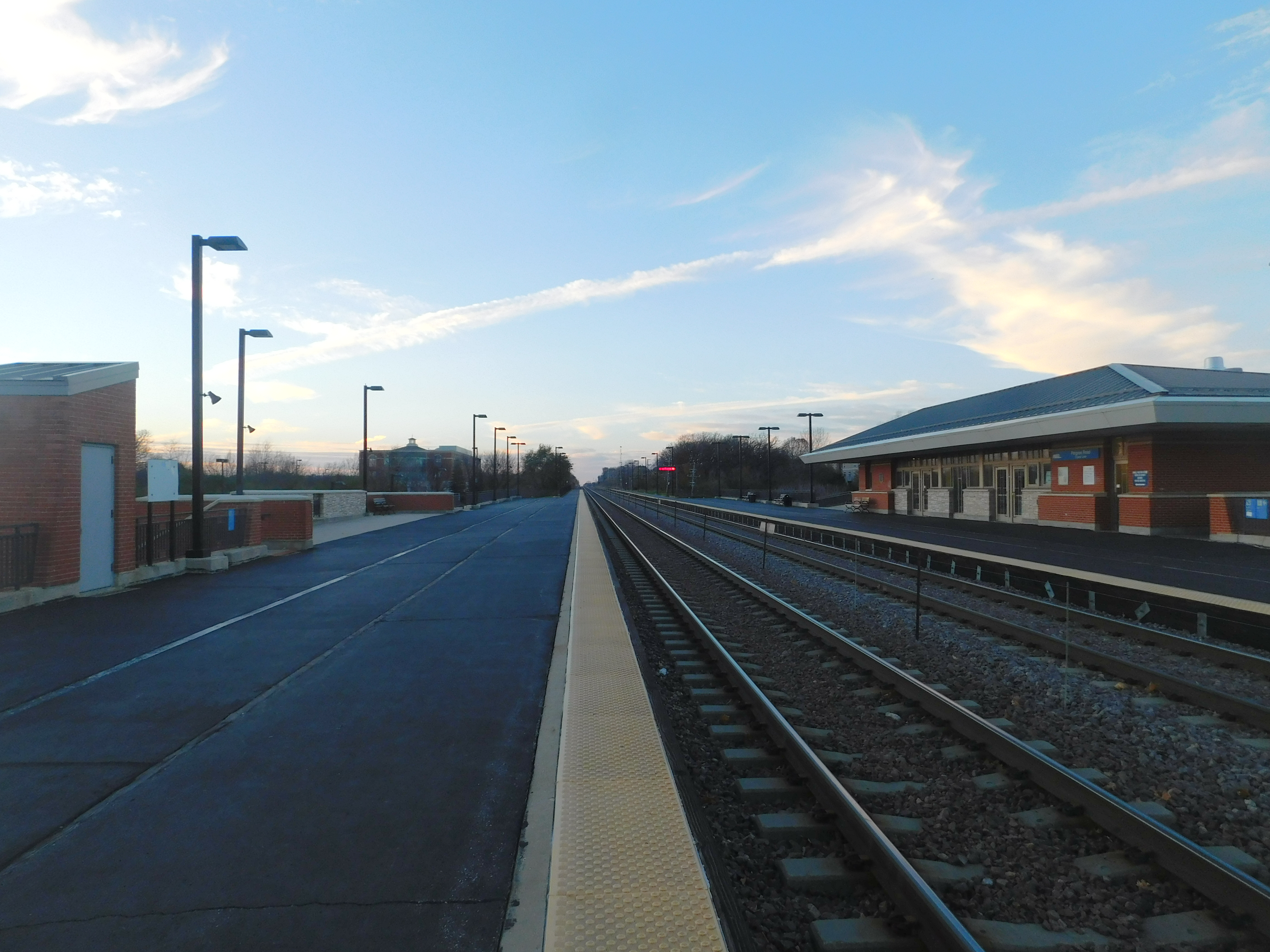
- Pingree Road station in November 2016.

General information
- Location: 570 Congress Parkway at Pingree Road; Crystal Lake, Illinois
- Coordinates: 42.2342°N 88.2980°W
- Owner: Metra
- Platforms: 2 side platforms
- Tracks: 2

Construction
- Structure type: Elevated
- Parking: Yes: Vending
- Cycle facilities: Yes
- Accessible: Yes

Other information
- Fare zone: 4

History
- Opened: September 7, 2005

Passengers
- 2018: 707 (average weekday) ▼5.9%
- Rank: 73 out of 236

Services
Preceding station	Metra	Following station
McHenry Limited service Terminus	Union Pacific Northwest McHenry Branch	Cary toward Ogilvie TC
Crystal Lake toward Harvard	Union Pacific Northwest Harvard Branch	Cary toward Ogilvie TC
Track layout
Location

Pingree Road is one of two commuter railroad stations on Metra's Union Pacific Northwest Line in the city of Crystal Lake, Illinois. The station is officially located at 570 Congress Parkway at Pingree Road, and is 41.7 miles (67.1 km) from Ogilvie Transportation Center in Chicago. In Metra's zone-based fare system, Pingree Road is in zone 4. As of 2018, Pingree Road is the 73rd busiest of the 236 non-downtown stations in the Metra system, with an average of 707 weekday boardings.

As of May 30, 2023, Pingree Road is served by 58 trains (30 inbound, 28 outbound) on weekdays, by 30 trains (15 in each direction) on Saturdays, and by 20 trains (nine inbound, all 11 outbound) on Sundays.

Pingree Road station is the newest station to be constructed on the UP-NW Line, opening on September 7, 2005. It serves as the southern terminus of the McHenry Branch of the UP-NW line. The actual junction between the main branch and McHenry branch is 0.8 miles (1.3 km) northwest of the station. West of the station, the Main Branch becomes the Harvard Branch. Currently, no bus connections are available at this station.
