= Cary station (Metra) =

Commuter rail station in Cary, Illinois

Cary

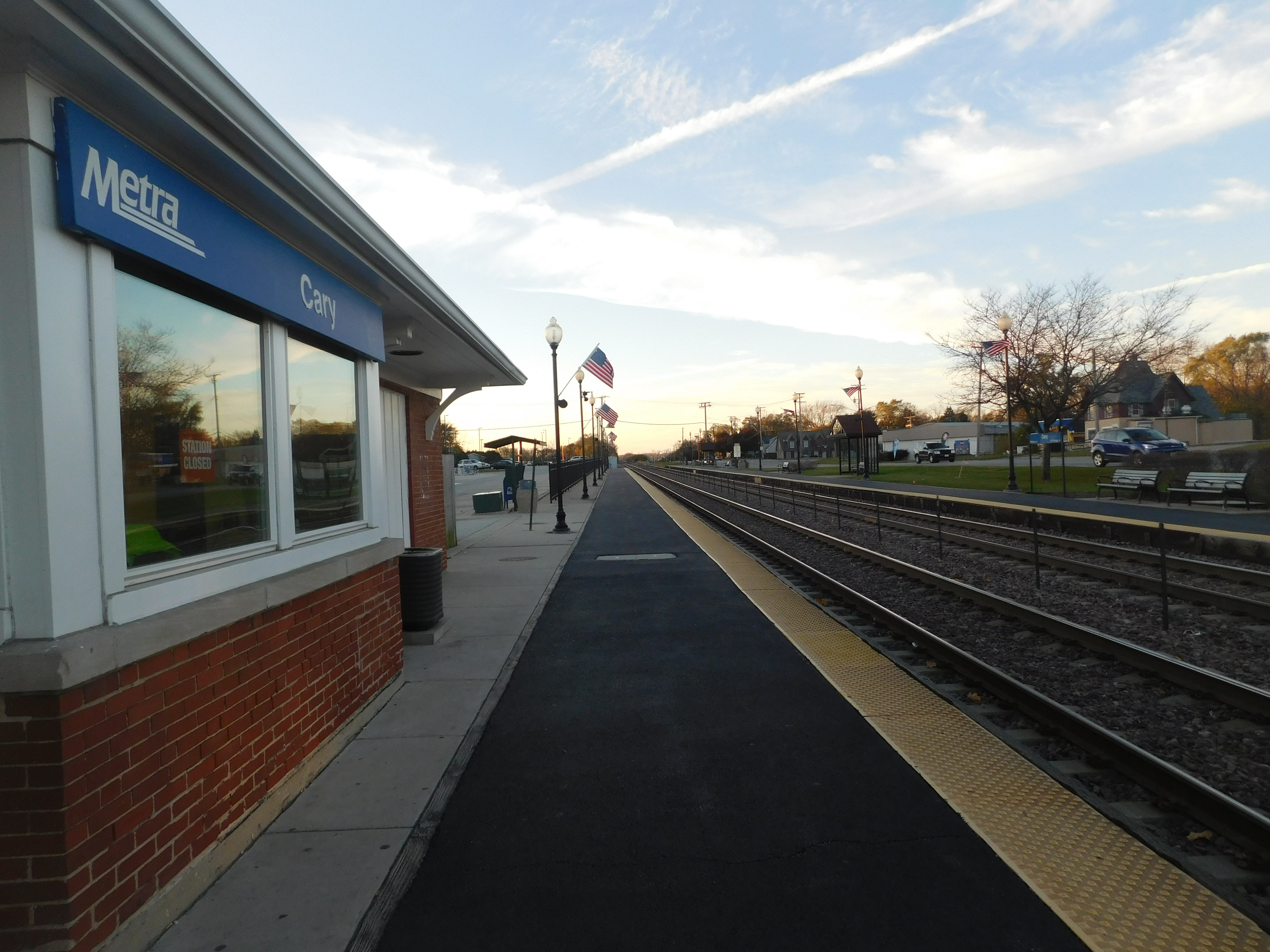
- Cary station in November 2016.

General information
- Location: 100 West Main Street at Northwest Highway; Cary, Illinois
- Coordinates: 42.2090°N 88.2415°W
- Owner: Metra
- Platforms: 2 side platforms
- Tracks: 2 tracks

Construction
- Structure type: Brick
- Parking: Yes
- Accessible: Yes

Other information
- Fare zone: 4

History
- Opened: 1952

Passengers
- 2018: 883 (average weekday) ▼6.2%
- Rank: 58 out of 236

Services
Preceding station	Metra	Following station
Pingree Road toward Harvard or McHenry	Union Pacific Northwest	Fox River Grove toward Ogilvie TC
Former services
Preceding station	Chicago and North Western Railway	Following station
Crystal Lake Terminus	Wisconsin Division	Fox River Grove toward Chicago
Track layout
Location

Cary is a station on Metra's Union Pacific Northwest Line in Cary, Illinois. The station is located at 100 W. Main St. near Northwest Highway (US 14). Cary is 38.3 miles (61.6 km) from Ogilvie Transportation Center, the southern terminus of the Union Pacific Northwest Line. In Metra's zone-based fare structure, Cary is located in zone 4. As of 2018, Cary is the 58th busiest of the 236 non-downtown stations in the Metra system, with an average of 883 weekday boardings. The station consists of two side platforms which serve two tracks. A station house where tickets may be purchased is on the inbound platform. The station house was on the outbound side until 2021, when it was demolished in favor of the new building. Parking is available.

As of May 30, 2023, Cary is served by 52 trains (27 inbound, 25 outbound) on weekdays, by 30 trains (15 in each direction) on Saturdays, and by 20 trains (nine inbound, all 11 outbound) on Sundays.
