= Orbitz =

Web-based travel fare aggregator service

Orbitz Worldwide, Inc.
- Type: Subsidiary
- Industry: Travel services
- Founded: June 2001; 25 years ago
- Headquarters: 500 West Madison, Chicago, Illinois, United States
- Key people: Ariane Gorin (CEO Expedia Group)
- Revenue: $932 million (2014)
- Number of employees: 1,530 (2014)
- Parent: Expedia Group
- Website: orbitz.com

Orbitz.com is an international travel fare aggregator website and travel metasearch engine. The website is owned by Orbitz Worldwide, Inc., a subsidiary of Expedia Group. It is headquartered in the Citigroup Center, Chicago, Illinois.

== Background ==
The company was incorporated in 2000 and began beta testing in February next year. Orbitz.com officially launched in June 2001.

== Antitrust concerns ==
Before, during, and two years after launching the site, the company faced antitrust criticism since its creators controlled 75% of U.S. air travel. The United States Department of Transportation saw no antitrust issues with the launch of the Orbitz website. The United States Department of Justice ruled in 2003 that Orbitz was not a cartel and that there was no evidence of price fixing.

Nielsen's Net rating division that the launch of the Orbitz website in June 2001 was the biggest e-commerce launch ever to that date.

== Ownership history ==
In November 2003, Orbitz filed paperwork to sell shares at between $22 and $24 each in an initial public offering. The company went public on December 18, 2003 at a price per share of $26. After the IPO, the airlines held 70% of the outstanding stock and over 90% of the voting power.

On September 29, 2004, Orbitz was acquired for $1.25 billion by New York City-based Cendant Corporation. Cendant paid $27.50 per share.

In 2006, The Blackstone Group acquired Travelport, the travel distribution services business of Cendant, for $4.3 billion in cash. At the time, Travelport included the Orbitz travel reservation website used by consumers, the Galileo computer reservations system used by airlines and thousands of travel agents, Gulliver's Travels and Associates wholesale travel business, and other travel related software brands and solutions.

Travelport announced in May 2007 that it had filed a registration statement with the U.S. Securities and Exchange Commission to sell a portion of Orbitz Worldwide in an initial public offering (IPO). Travelport said it planned to use a portion of the proceeds to pay down its debt. Trading began on July 20, 2007, and the IPO transaction closed on July 25, 2007. Travelport owned approximately 48 percent of Orbitz Worldwide following the IPO.

In February 2015, Expedia announced that it would acquire Orbitz for $1.6 billion in cash, to better compete with Priceline.com. The deal was announced a few days after Expedia agreed to purchase Travelocity.

== Technologies ==
Orbitz ran on a mixed Red Hat Linux and Solaris based platform and was an early adopter of Sun Microsystems' Jini platform in a clustered Java environment. JBoss is used as application servers within their environment, along with various other proprietary and open source software. Orbitz licenses ITA Software's Lisp-powered QPX software to power their site. Orbitz Worldwide brands have been migrated to a common technology platform, which enables the same platform to service multiple travel brands in multiple languages in different markets and currencies as well. Orbitz has released parts of its Complex event processing infrastructure as Open Source.

== Controversies ==
=== Southwest Airlines ===
Southwest Airlines filed a lawsuit against Orbitz for trademark infringement and false advertising in May 2001. Southwest, which had opposed the project from the outset, claimed Orbitz misrepresented its prices and used its trademarks without permission. In July, it withdrew its fares from Airline Tariff Publishing Company, the entity that distributes fare information to Orbitz and others, and dropped its case against Orbitz. Southwest went on to remove themselves from every other online outlet except their own. In June 2008, Orbitz For Business became one of the first Online Travel Agents to offer Southwest flights on the Orbitz For Business website.

=== WebLoyalty ===
In July 2009, CNET revealed that Orbitz, along with other popular consumer websites Buy.com and Fandango, have been routinely giving post-transaction marketers access to their customers' credit cards. The Senate Commerce Committee investigating these companies has described their services as a "scam". The scam works by charging a monthly fee (many users report a $12 charge from Reservation Rewards or Webloyalty showing up on their credit card statements) that is piggybacked with the Orbitz sale (as it stands, Orbitz Terms of Service agreement currently allows them to share customers' credit card information with third parties for their own uses).

=== Milgram v. Orbitz ===
In 2009, the state of New Jersey filed a lawsuit against the company alleging violation of their Consumer Fraud Act surrounding events with a Bruce Springsteen concert, where tickets were allegedly offered for sale on their website which did not actually exist. The court in Milgram v. Orbitz granted summary judgment for Orbitz, finding that Section 230 of the Communications Decency Act preempted the state law consumer fraud claims.

=== American Airlines ===
In December 2010, American Airlines temporarily ceased offering fares through Orbitz following pressure from American to convince Orbitz to use its AA Direct Connect electronic transaction system. AA tried to establish that Direct Connect would have full control over the distribution of its products and reduce GDS segment fees. Furthermore, Direct Connect enables AA to sell ancillary services to its customers. American was later ordered by an Illinois Court to resume offering fares and flight schedules. The court order came only days after American released a video jabbing Orbitz on YouTube.

=== Media Matters' "War on Fox" ===
Media Matters runs a website called DropFox.com, aiming to get advertisers to boycott Fox News. Orbitz initially referred to Media Matters' efforts as a "smear campaign".

=== Skiplagged lawsuit ===
In 2014, Orbitz and United Airlines initiated a federal lawsuit against 22-year-old Skiplagged founder Aktarer Zaman. The complaint alleges that Zaman "intentionally and maliciously" interfered with airline industry business relationships "by promoting prohibited forms of travel" which violate the common carrier contract with passengers. The complaint is centered on airline policies against hidden city tickets. Although the hidden-city practice itself is not illegal, the complaint alleged that Zaman's website is disruptive to their business. The lawsuit was dismissed.

== Sources ==
- "ORBZ Securities Registration Statement (S-1/A)". July 3, 2002.
- Weinberg, Ari (November 26, 2003). "Will Orbitz's IPO Fly?". Forbes.
- "Orbitz IPO Soars". December 18, 2003.
- "Orbitz doesn't take off on first trade day". January 16, 2004.
- "Orbitz Loses Altitude". December 18, 2003.
- "Cendant Corporation Completes Acquisition of Orbitz". November 12, 2004.
- "Carl de Marcken: Inside Orbitz". January 12, 2001.
