= Airfair =

Flight tracking app

AirFair/Flyzy (mobile app)
- Developer: Allay Logic Ltd.
- Release: 2016
- Stable release: 1.5
- Operating system: Android and iOS
- Available in: English
- Type: Travel

AirFair was a mobile travel application that checks flights, and shows whether a traveler is owed compensation.

== History ==
AirFair was developed in 2016 by Allay Logic Ltd; a Newcastle-based tech-company.

== Services ==
AirFair offered a free flight check to see if compensation is owed. The app could indicate how much the person is owed within minutes whether the flight was delayed, cancelled or the traveler is refused boarding.

== See also ==
- Flight cancellation and delay
- Flight Compensation Regulation 261/2004
- Airline booking ploys
- Tracking (commercial airline flight)
