= William Dennison Cary =

American businessman

- Born: William Dennison Cary; September 7, 1808; Sandy Creek, New York
- Died: March 8, 1861 (aged 52); Cary Station, Illinois, U.S.
- Resting place: Cary Cemetery, Cary, Illinois
- Other names: William Cary; William D. Cary
- Occupations: Farmer; Postmaster
- Spouse: Lodemia Ell (m. 1830)
- Children: 7

William Dennison Cary (Note: Erroneously recorded as William Daniel Cary, William Daniel Cary I, William Dennison Carey, William D. Carey or similar variations.) (September 7, 1808 – February 3, 1861) was an American farmer and postmaster. He is the founder and namesake of Cary, Illinois.

== Biography ==
William Dennison Cary was born on September 7, 1808, to John Flavel Cary and Esther Stanton in Sandy Creek, New York.

William Dennison Cary's paternal grandfather was William Cary, who was a deacon in Lempster, New Hampshire and served as a captain both under John Fellows in 1776 and again in Bellow's Regiment of Militia during the Saratoga Campaign in 1777, where he was also present at General Burgoyne's surrender on October 17. William Dennison Cary has lineage to The Cary Family.

In 1830, William Dennison Cary married Lodemia Ells, who was one year older, in New York. Their first child, Cornelia, was born in 1832. Two years later, they welcomed another daughter, Hulda. In 1841, he and his family moved from New York to Illinois as Cary purchased 82 acres (0.33 km^{2}) of land. In the next few years, William Dennison and Lodemia welcomed four more children: John Franklin, Jane, Daniel William, Susan, and Caltha.

As his family grew, Cary purchased an additional 160 acres (0.65 km^{2}) of land for $1.25 per acre through three separate purchases in 1844 and established Cary Station, a small farming community. In 1845, he built a red brick house on West Main Street, which still stands today.

In addition to farming, Cary briefly assumed the position of the second postmaster of Cary Station in 1857 after the first postmaster (who was appointed by President Franklin Pierce), James Nish, resigned the year prior. Cary remained postmaster until Nish's brother, John Nish, took office of Cary Station's postmaster later that same year after Cary's brief tenure as was received poorly by residents for unknown reasons.

Shortly after Cary's land was recorded on 23 February 1859, a single railroad that connected to Chicago and Janesville was built at Cary Station, where the modern day Metra Train Station is located.

Throughout his life, William Dennison Cary bought and developed more land, owning about 640 acres (2.6 km^{2}) at the time of his death in 1861.

== Death ==
William Dennison Cary died on February 3, 1861. After his death most of his land was sold to various Cary Station residents to pay off outstanding debts.

Two of Cary's sons, Daniel William and John Franklin, enlisted in the Union Army during the American Civil War, serving in Company I, 95th Illinois Infantry Regiment and Company E, 15th Illinois Infantry Regiment, respectively. John Franklin Cary died of injuries sustained the year prior in 1866.

William Dennison Cary, his wife Lodemia, five of their seven children, and many of their descendants are buried in the land that became Cary Cemetery.

== Legacy ==
During his lifetime, the community he built was known as Cary Station; it later adopted the shortened name of Cary and was formally incorporated on July 17, 1893.

The red brick house that Cary built in 1845 still stands today. However, in 1966, the house was moved to a lot on East Ross Street, when Ameritech bought the West Main property. The present-day house includes two sections that were added later.

In May 2018, The Cary-Grove Historical Society unveiled a bronze bust of William Dennison Cary in Jaycee Park in Cary. The statue was sculpted by Guy Bellaver based on a daguerreotype picture, the only known surviving image of Cary.
