= A. J. Raebel =

American gridiron football player (born 1985)

Profile
- Position: Defensive end

Personal information
- Born: April 11, 1985 (age 41); Cary, Illinois, U.S.
- Listed height: 6 ft 5 in (1.96 m)
- Listed weight: 244 lb (111 kg)

Career information
- College: University of Wisconsin–Whitewater
- NFL draft: 2008: undrafted

Career history
- 2008: Green Bay Blizzard
- 2009: Saskatchewan Roughriders*
- * Offseason or practice squad member only

Awards and highlights
- Division III national champion (2007)
- Stats at CFL.ca

A. J. ‘Big Red Dog’ Raebel (born April 11, 1985) is an American former football defensive end. He played college football for the Division III UW–Whitewater Warhawks, helping them win the national championship in 2007. After going undrafted in the 2008 NFL draft, he had a tryout with the Minnesota Vikings in May 2008 but was not signed. Raebel then played a few weeks with the Green Bay Blizzard of the af2. In September 2008, he signed a contract with the Saskatchewan Roughriders of the Canadian Football League for the 2009 season. He was diagnosed with testicular cancer at the age of 24.
