= Woodstock station (Illinois) =

Commuter rail station in Woodstock, Illinois

Woodstock

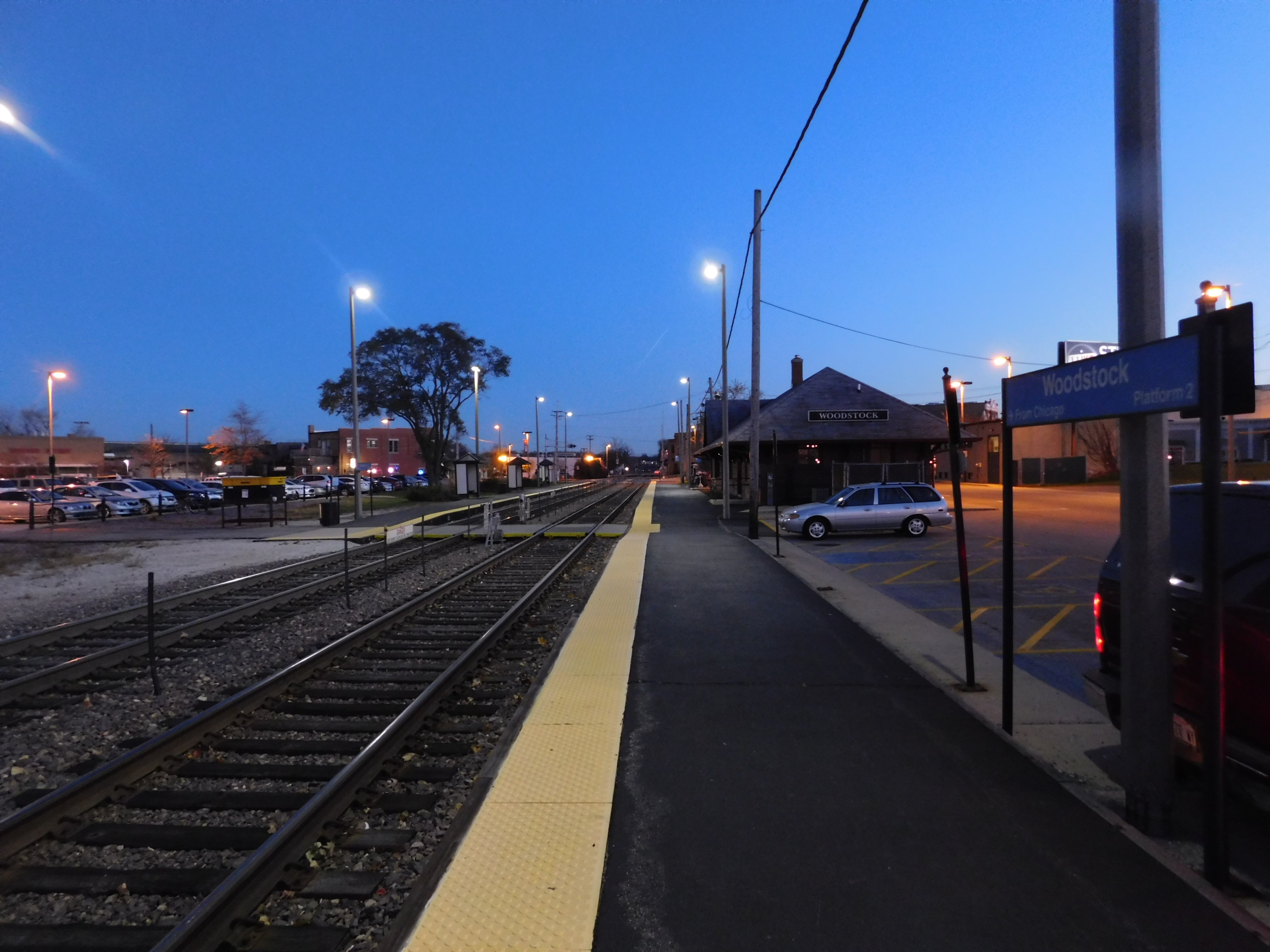
- Woodstock station in November 2016.

General information
- Location: 90 Church Street; Woodstock, Illinois
- Coordinates: 42.3170°N 88.4476°W
- Owner: City of Woodstock
- Platforms: 2 side platforms
- Tracks: 2
- Connections: Pace Buses

Construction
- Accessible: Yes

Other information
- Fare zone: 4

History
- Opened: 1915
- Rebuilt: 1993

Passengers
- 2018: 273 (average weekday) ▼13.9%
- Rank: 149 out of 236

Services
Preceding station	Metra	Following station
Harvard Terminus	Union Pacific Northwest Harvard Branch	Crystal Lake toward Ogilvie TC
Former services
Preceding station	Metra	Following station
Hartland closed 1984 toward Harvard	Union Pacific Northwest Harvard Branch	Crystal Lake toward Ogilvie TC
Preceding station	Chicago and North Western Railway	Following station
Hartland toward Minneapolis	Chicago – Minneapolis via Madison	Ridgefield toward Chicago
Track layout
Location

Woodstock is a commuter railroad station on Metra's Union Pacific Northwest Line located in Woodstock, Illinois. The station is located on the Harvard branch of the Northwest Line and is the last stop before Harvard; inbound trains run as far as Ogilvie Transportation Center in Chicago. The station is located in fare zone 4. Woodstock is 51.6 miles (83.0 km) from Chicago via Metra. The station consists of two grade-level side platforms which serve two tracks; there is a rail crossover located just north of the station. As of 2018, Woodstock is the 149th busiest of the 236 non-downtown stations on the Metra system, with an average of 273 weekday boardings.

As of May 30, 2023, Woodstock is served by 27 trains (14 inbound, 13 outbound) on weekdays, by 20 trains (10 in each direction) on Saturdays, and by 15 trains (seven inbound, eight outbound) on Sundays.

At the present time, there is no ticket agent at the Woodstock station. Passengers boarding at Woodstock may buy one-way or weekend pass tickets from the Conductor for cash, or purchase an electronic ticket with Ventra. Purchases of other types of tickets or purchases using other payment methods must be done at a station with a ticket agent. The closest station with a ticket agent is Crystal Lake.

== Pace connections ==
- 807 Woodstock/McHenry via Wonder Lake
- 808 Crystal Lake/Harvard
