= Skiplagged =

Online travel agency and metasearch engine

- Skiplagged.com logo
- Website type: Metasearch engine
- Available in: English
- Founder: Aktarer Zaman
- Website: www.skiplagged.com
- Launched: 2013; 13 years ago
- Current status: Active

Skiplagged.com is an online travel agency and metasearch engine for booking flights and hotels. It popularized the tactic of hidden city ticketing, also known as skiplagging.

== History ==
The website was started by Aktarer Zaman in 2013, when he was 20 years old.

In November 2014, United Airlines and Orbitz filed a civil lawsuit for $75,000 in lost revenue, claiming that the website violated fare rules. The Orbitz lawsuit was settled out of court, in which Skiplagged agreed not to redirect traffic to Orbitz sites or use Orbitz branding. The United lawsuit was dismissed by the courts on procedural grounds. United did not pursue further legal action. Donors contributed for legal expenses via GoFundMe.

In 2021, Southwest Airlines sued Skiplagged for displaying the airline's fares. The lawsuit was settled out of court.

In 2023, Skiplagged was sued by American Airlines. In August 2024, a district court judge in Texas ruled that Skiplagged had not breached contract, but had violated American's copyrights.

== See also ==
- Expedia
- Trivago
- Webjet
