= High School Stories =

- Genre: Reality television
- Directed by: Danielle Berger • Matthew Blaine
- Country of origin: United States
- Original language: English
- No. of seasons: 4
- No. of episodes: 72

Production
- Running time: 30 minutes

Original release
- Network: MTV; MTV2
- Release: February 2, 2004 – 2010

High School Stories: Scandals, Pranks, and Controversies is an original program that aired on the MTV network from 2004 to 2010, that featured stories of pranks, scandals, and controversies kids took part in when they were in high school. MTV searched for interesting stories across the United States via the internet and news reports. It moved to MTV2 starting with the final season starting on October 4, 2010.

== Format ==
Each episode is 30 minutes long and focuses on one American high school per episode. The first half of the episode is generally focused on the planning and execution of the prank while the second half focuses on the controversy and disciplinary consequences that follow. The show occasionally focuses on events or controversies a high school or its students have faced—the show does not necessarily involve a prank or practical joke.
