= Airline booking ploys =

Flying cheaply by evading airline rules

Airline booking ploys are used by travelers in commercial aviation to lower the price of flying by circumventing airlines' rules about how airline tickets may be used. They are generally a breach of the contract of carriage between the passenger and the airline. Airlines discourage such activities but have difficulty enforcing measures against them.

== Throwaway ticketing ==
Throwaway ticketing is purchasing a ticket with the intent to use only a portion of the included travel. This situation may arise when a passenger wants to travel only one way but the discounted round-trip fare is cheaper than a one-way ticket. This can happen on mainline carriers where all one-way tickets are full price. For instance, a passenger intending to fly only from Los Angeles to New York may find the one-way ticket costs $800 but that the round-trip fare is $500. The passenger buys the round trip, takes the flight to New York, and stays there, "throwing away" the second half of the ticket by not taking the return flight. It is possible to "throw away" only the final segments of a ticket because not showing up for the outbound trip often leads the airline to cancel the entire reservation.

== Hidden-city ticketing ==
Hidden-city ticketing or skiplagging is a variant of throwaway ticketing. The passenger books a ticket to a flight with a connection at the intended destination, sets forth at the connection node, and discards the remaining segment. Flight fares are subject to market forces and so do not necessarily correlate to the distance flown. As a result, a flight from point A to point C, with a connection node at point B, might be cheaper than a flight from point A to point B. It is then possible to purchase a ticket from point A to point C, disembark at point B, and discard the remaining segment.

Using the hidden-city tactic is usually practical only for one-way trips, as airlines cancel the subsequent parts of the trip once a traveler has disembarked. Thus, round-trip itineraries need to be created by piecing two one-way flights together. This tactic also requires that the traveler have carry-on luggage only, as checked baggage items will typically be unloaded only at the flight's ticketed final destination. Exceptions to this only occur when reentering a country where luggage must be processed by customs agents, when changing airports, or when train travel is involved. This allows a traveler to reclaim their luggage before checking in for their final destination and simply leave the airport.

In 2014, United Airlines and Orbitz filed a lawsuit against Skiplagged, a flight search website focused on finding hidden-city tickets, alleging damages from lost revenues. The lawsuit was dismissed.

Hidden-city ticketing was used by New Zealand citizens during the COVID-19 pandemic. All travellers entering New Zealand were required to have a voucher for Managed Isolation and Quarantine (MIQ). MIQ rooms were allocated initially on a first-come, first-served basis and later by lottery, meaning there were not enough rooms available for all travellers. Some New Zealand citizens discovered a loophole: they booked a flight that transited through New Zealand and then disembarked in New Zealand (typically Auckland International Airport), discarding the final leg of their journey. As New Zealand citizens, they could not be refused entry to New Zealand, and so they were admitted to MIQ despite not having vouchers. The New Zealand Government considered imprisoning or fining people who used this loophole.

== Legal status and consequences ==
Airlines are strongly opposed to booking ploys because they subvert their revenue management techniques and thus reduce profits. Airlines sometimes also mention unspecified "public safety" concerns.

Booking ploys are generally a breach of the contract of carriage between the passenger and the airline. Violating the contract is generally a civil matter.

In 2019, Lufthansa sued a passenger in Germany for hidden-city ticketing. The Federal Court of Justice ruled in 2025 that provisions in the Lufthansa terms and conditions for extra fees for customers who intentionally miss connections were not compatible with consumer rights legislation, but deemed it lawful for airlines to refuse further carriage in such cases.
