= Accenture Tower (Chicago) =

Office skyscraper in Chicago, Illinois

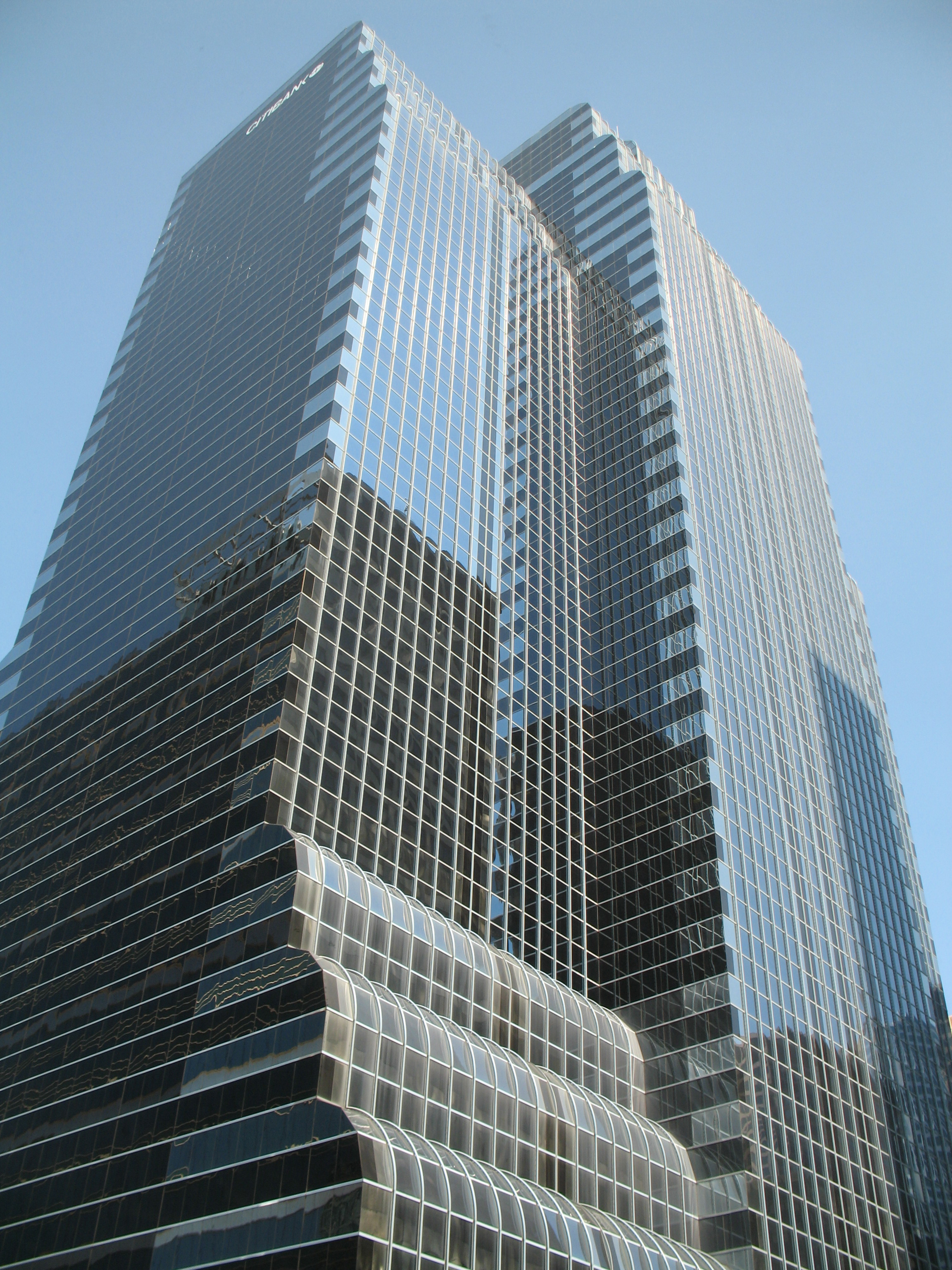
- 500 West Madison
- Former names: Northwestern Atrium Center, Citigroup Center

General information
- Type: Commercial
- Location: 500 West Madison, Chicago, Illinois
- Coordinates: 41°52′55″N 87°38′26″W
- Construction started: 1985
- Completed: 1987

Height
- Roof: 180 m (590 ft)

Technical details
- Floor count: 42
- Floor area: 157,934 sq ft (14,672.5 m^{2})

Design and construction
- Architect: Murphy/Jahn

Other information
- Public transit: UPN UPNW UPW at Ogilvie Transportation Center; Green Pink at Clinton

Accenture Tower (500 West Madison) is a 42-story, 588-foot (180 m) skyscraper in Chicago, Illinois. Located between Clinton and Canal Streets on Madison Street, the structure was designed by the architecture firm Murphy/Jahn in a late modernist style. The building, previously named the Northwestern Atrium Center and Citigroup Center, was constructed between 1984 and 1987 on the air rights obtained by the destruction of the head house of the 1911 North Western Station. The building contains retail and offices, and is connected to the platforms of Ogilvie Transportation Center.

On July 10, 2019, the building was officially renamed to Accenture Tower after a commitment from Accenture PLC.

== Shooting ==
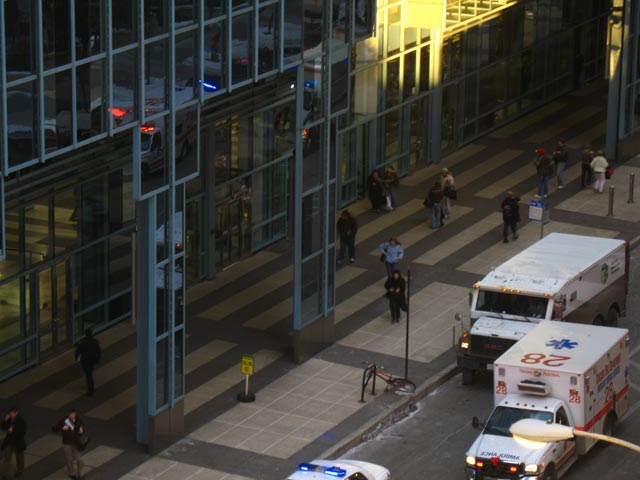
People are evacuated from the Citigroup Center

On December 8, 2006, a man opened fire in a law office located on the 38th floor of the Citigroup Center, killing three people. The gunman was later killed by Chicago police.

== See also ==
- List of buildings
- List of skyscrapers
- List of tallest buildings in Chicago
- List of tallest buildings in the United States
- World's tallest structures
