= Crystal Lake station =

Commuter rail station in Crystal Lake, Illinois

Crystal Lake

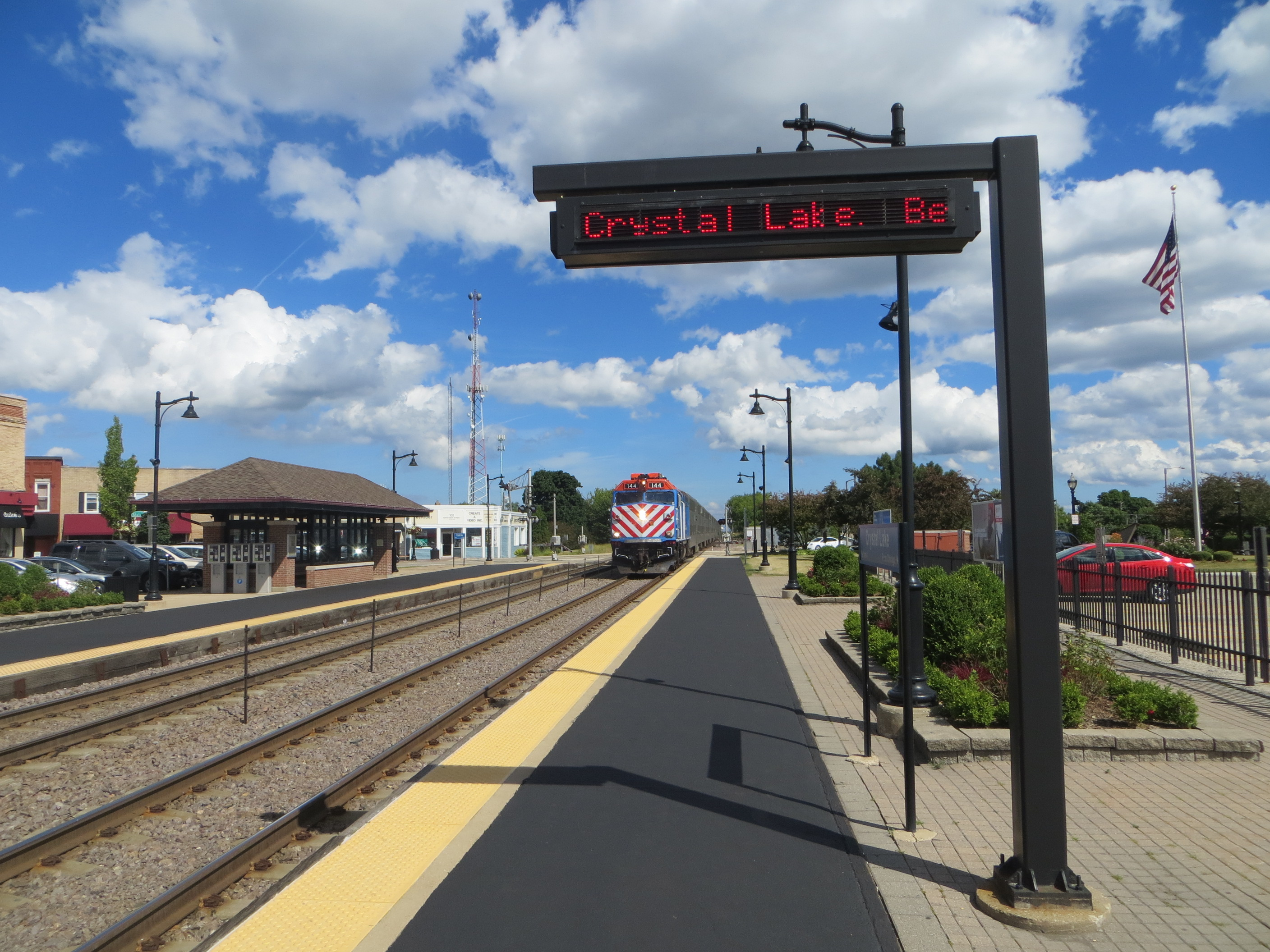
- Crystal Lake station in July 2016.

General information
- Location: Woodstock Avenue & Grant Street; Crystal Lake, Illinois
- Coordinates: 42.2441°N 88.3172°W
- Owner: City of Crystal Lake
- Platforms: 2 side platforms
- Tracks: 2
- Connections: Pace Buses

Construction
- Accessible: Yes

Other information
- Fare zone: 4

History
- Opened: 1915

Passengers
- 2018: 1,138 (average weekday) ▼5.1%
- Rank: 36 out of 236

Services
Preceding station	Metra	Following station
Woodstock toward Harvard	Union Pacific Northwest Harvard Branch	Pingree Road toward Ogilvie TC
Former services
Preceding station	Chicago and North Western Railway	Following station
Ridgefield toward Minneapolis	Chicago – Minneapolis via Madison	Barrington toward Chicago
Terminus	Wisconsin Division	Cary toward Chicago
McHenry toward Williams Bay	Williams Bay Branch	Terminus
- Crystal Lake Chicago and North Western Railway Company Depot
- U.S. National Register of Historic Places
- NRHP reference No.: 100012895
- Added to NRHP: April 9, 2026
Track layout
Location

Crystal Lake is one of two stations on Metra's Union Pacific Northwest Line located in Crystal Lake, Illinois. The station is two stops away from the line's terminus at Harvard, and most of the trains on the Northwest Line only run as far as Crystal Lake. A large coach yard is adjacent to the station and has additional storage tracks to store Metra trains overnight, and on holidays and weekends. A Union Pacific maintenance facility and office, some storage tracks for local freight trains and maintenance of way equipment as well as a junction are also located just southeast of here. The branch line to McHenry splits off at this junction. The station is 43.3 miles (69.7 km) away from Ogilvie Transportation Center. Parking is available at the station. As of 2018, Crystal Lake is the 36th busiest of the 236 non-downtown stations in the Metra system, with an average of 1,138 weekday boardings.

As of May 30, 2023, Crystal Lake is served by 52 trains (27 inbound, 25 outbound) on weekdays, by 30 trains (15 in each direction) on Saturdays, and by 20 trains (nine inbound, all 11 outbound) on Sundays.

On weekdays, 13 inbound trains originate from Crystal Lake and 12 trains terminate here, with five inbound trains originating and five outbound trains terminating here on Saturdays, and two inbound trains originating and three outbound trains terminating here on Sundays.

== Pace connections ==
- 550 Elgin Transportation Center/Crystal Lake
- 806 Crystal Lake/Fox Lake
- 808 Crystal Lake/Harvard
