= McHenry station =

Commuter rail station in McHenry, Illinois

McHenry

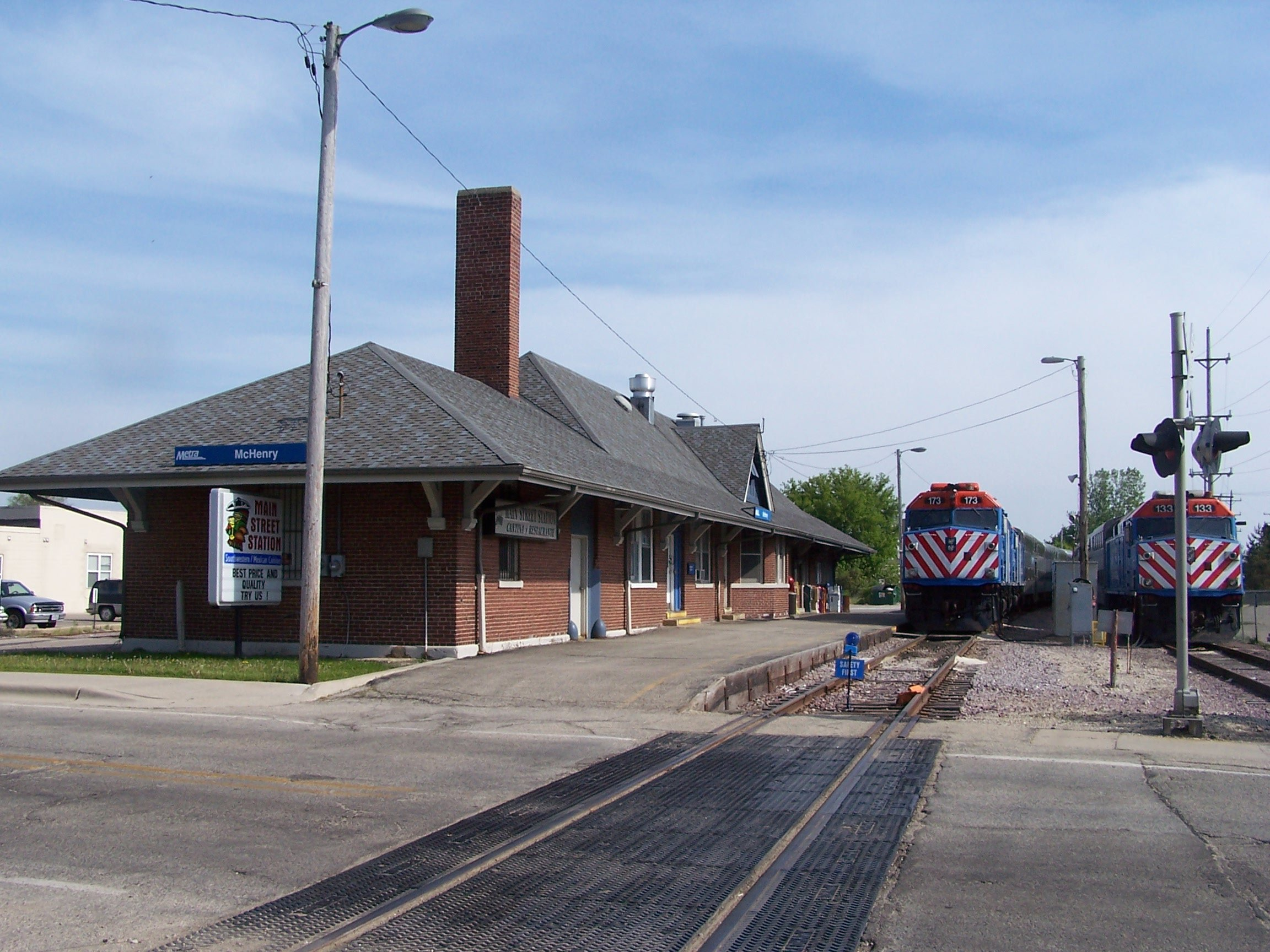

General information
- Location: 4005 Main Street; McHenry, Illinois
- Coordinates: 42.3434°N 88.2760°W
- Owner: Metra
- Platforms: 1 side platform
- Tracks: 2
- Connections: Pace Buses

Construction
- Accessible: Yes

Other information
- Fare zone: 4

History
- Opened: 1910

Passengers
- 2018: 85 (average weekday) ▼11.5%
- Rank: 198 out of 236

Services
Preceding station	Metra	Following station
Terminus	Union Pacific Northwest McHenry Branch	Pingree Road toward Ogilvie TC
Former services
Preceding station	Chicago and North Western Railway	Following station
Ringwood toward Williams Bay	Williams Bay Branch	Crystal Lake Terminus
Track layout
Location

McHenry is a station on Metra's Union Pacific Northwest Line, located in McHenry, Illinois. The station is the terminus of the McHenry Branch of the Northwest Line; inbound trains operate to Ogilvie Transportation Center in Chicago. The station is also the only station on the McHenry Branch after it splits off at Pingree Road, although the line previously extended to Williams Bay, Wisconsin. Proposals exist to expand service on the line by adding stations in Prairie Grove and Johnsburg. It is the fifth furthest Metra Station from Chicago at 50.47 miles (81.22 km). Most Northwest Line trains operate along the Harvard branch to Harvard or Crystal Lake rather than the McHenry Branch. The station only has one track and one platform due to the low number of trains that serve the station. Two storage tracks are used to store two trains during overnight hours as well as weekends and holidays. The station is located at grade level. There is one grade crossing of a road at the station, which is placed under a Federal Railroad Administration horn quiet zone. As of 2018, McHenry is the 198th busiest of the 236 non-downtown stations in the Metra system, with an average of 85 weekday boardings.

As of February 16, 2024, McHenry is served by six trains (three in each direction) on weekdays. There is no weekend or holiday service on the McHenry branch.

== Station layout ==
McHenry station consists of one platform and two tracks. One track is used by revenue trains while the other is used as siding for out-of-service trains. The tracks, despite no current use, continue to Barnard Mill Road in the Village of Ringwood, Illinois at the Dow Chemical plant, where the Union Pacific McHenry Subdivision ends. The tracks were pulled up between Richmond, Illinois and Ringwood in 1980 when service was cut back. However, UP left trackage for local freight trains that served industries in and around McHenry, all of which are long gone. The only freight customer remaining on the McHenry Subdivision is Terra Cotta Industries in Prairie Grove, 4 miles south of McHenry station.

== Pace bus connections ==
As of October 2018:

- 806 Crystal Lake/Fox Lake
- 807 Woodstock/McHenry via Wonder Lake
