= Harvard station (Metra) =

Metra commuter rail station in Harvard, Illinois

Harvard

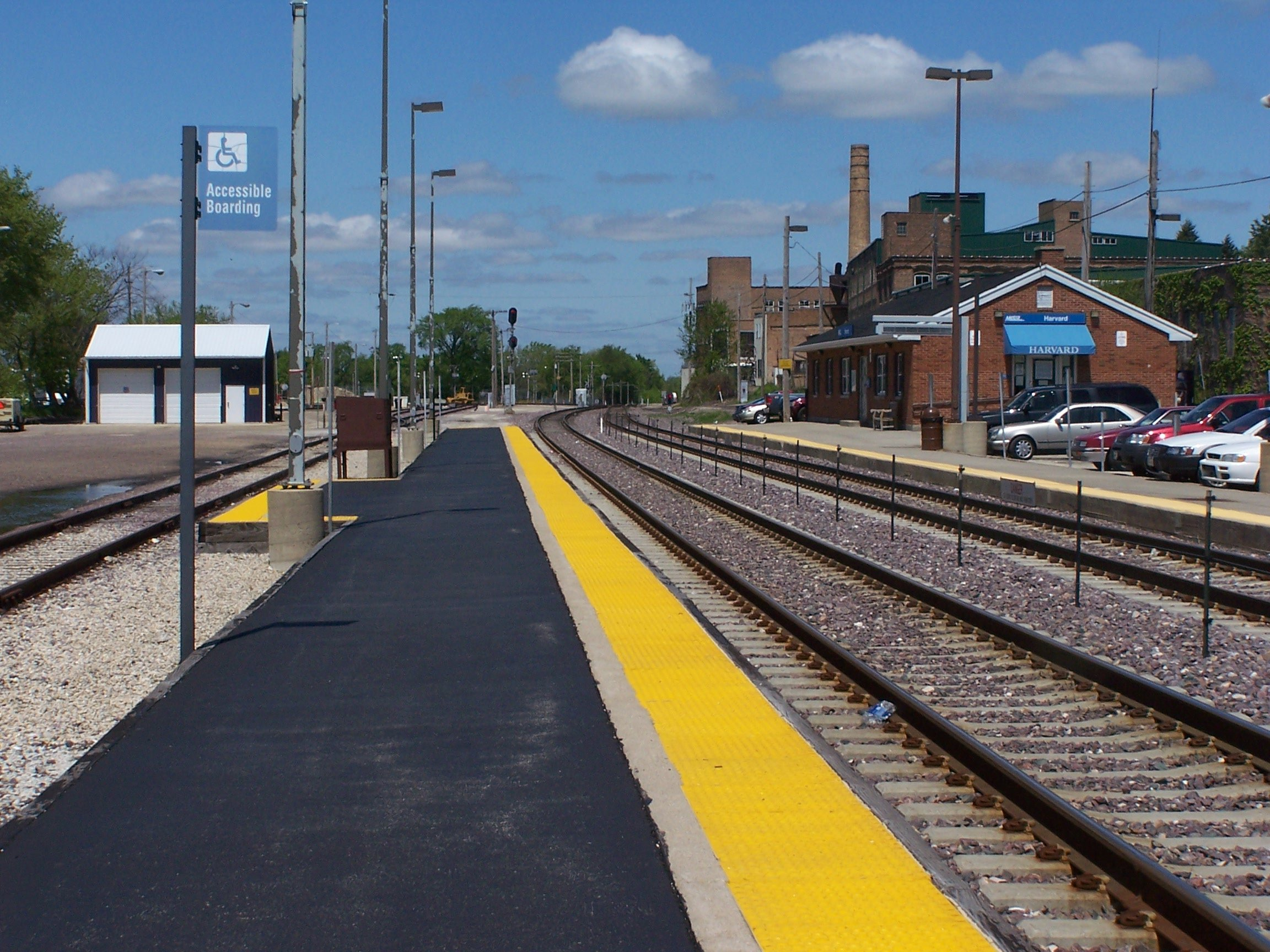
- Harvard Metra station, looking northwest

General information
- Location: 1 North Ayer Street; Harvard, Illinois
- Coordinates: 42.4199°N 88.6175°W
- Owner: Union Pacific
- Platforms: 1 side platform, 1 island platform
- Tracks: 3
- Connections: Pace Buses

Construction
- Structure type: Brick
- Parking: Yes, parking lot operated by City of Harvard
- Accessible: Yes

Other information
- Fare zone: 4

History
- Opened: 1993

Passengers
- 2018: 265 (average weekday) ▲19.9%
- Rank: 151 out of 236

Services
Preceding station	Metra	Following station
Terminus	Union Pacific Northwest Harvard Branch	Woodstock toward Ogilvie TC
Former services
Preceding station	Metra	Following station
Terminus	Union Pacific Northwest Harvard Branch	Hartland closed 1984 toward Ogilvie TC
Preceding station	Chicago and North Western Railway	Following station
Sharon via Clinton toward Minneapolis	Chicago – Minneapolis via Madison	Hartland toward Chicago
Capron via Beloit toward Minneapolis	Chicago – Minneapolis via Madison	Hartland toward Chicago
Chemung toward Rockford	KD Line	Alden toward Kenosha
Track layout
Location

Harvard station is a Metra commuter rail station in Harvard, Illinois. It is the terminus of the Union Pacific Northwest Line. Harvard is the farthest Metra station from Chicago at 63.16 miles (101.65 km) from Chicago; the next furthest stop, Antioch on the North Central Service, is over 10 miles closer to Chicago at 52.9 miles (85.1 km). The station contains a parking lot operated by the City of Harvard. A coach yard is adjacent to the station and is used to store trains during weekends and overnight hours. Harvard was the only Metra station located in the M zone, until all fare zones beyond J were retired by Metra in 2018. Trains that traveled to Chicago passed through an entire fare zone to reach Woodstock. No stations were located in zone L. Originally, Hartland was the only station located in zone L, however, the stop was closed in 1984. Harvard was then located in fare zone J until February 2024, when the fare structure was simplified across the system. Harvard is now in Zone 4. It is the westernmost station of the Metra system; the next most westerly stop is Elburn on the Union Pacific West Line. Harvard is the last station to use more than one track, as further beyond this station, the UP line is single tracked until reaching Janesville, Wisconsin.

Being Chicago's most northwesterly commuter rail station, the Harvard station attracts commuters from the Rockford and Belvidere region of northern Illinois as well as south-central Wisconsin. As of 2018, Harvard is the 151st busiest of the 236 non-downtown stations in the Metra system, with an average of 265 weekday boardings.

As of February 16, 2024, Harvard is served by 27 trains (14 inbound, 13 outbound) on weekdays, by 20 trains (10 in each direction) on Saturdays, and by 15 trains (seven inbound, eight outbound) on Sundays.

== Bus connections ==
Pace

- 808 Crystal Lake/Harvard
