= Ogilvie Transportation Center =

Commuter rail station in Chicago, Illinois

Ogilvie (OTC)

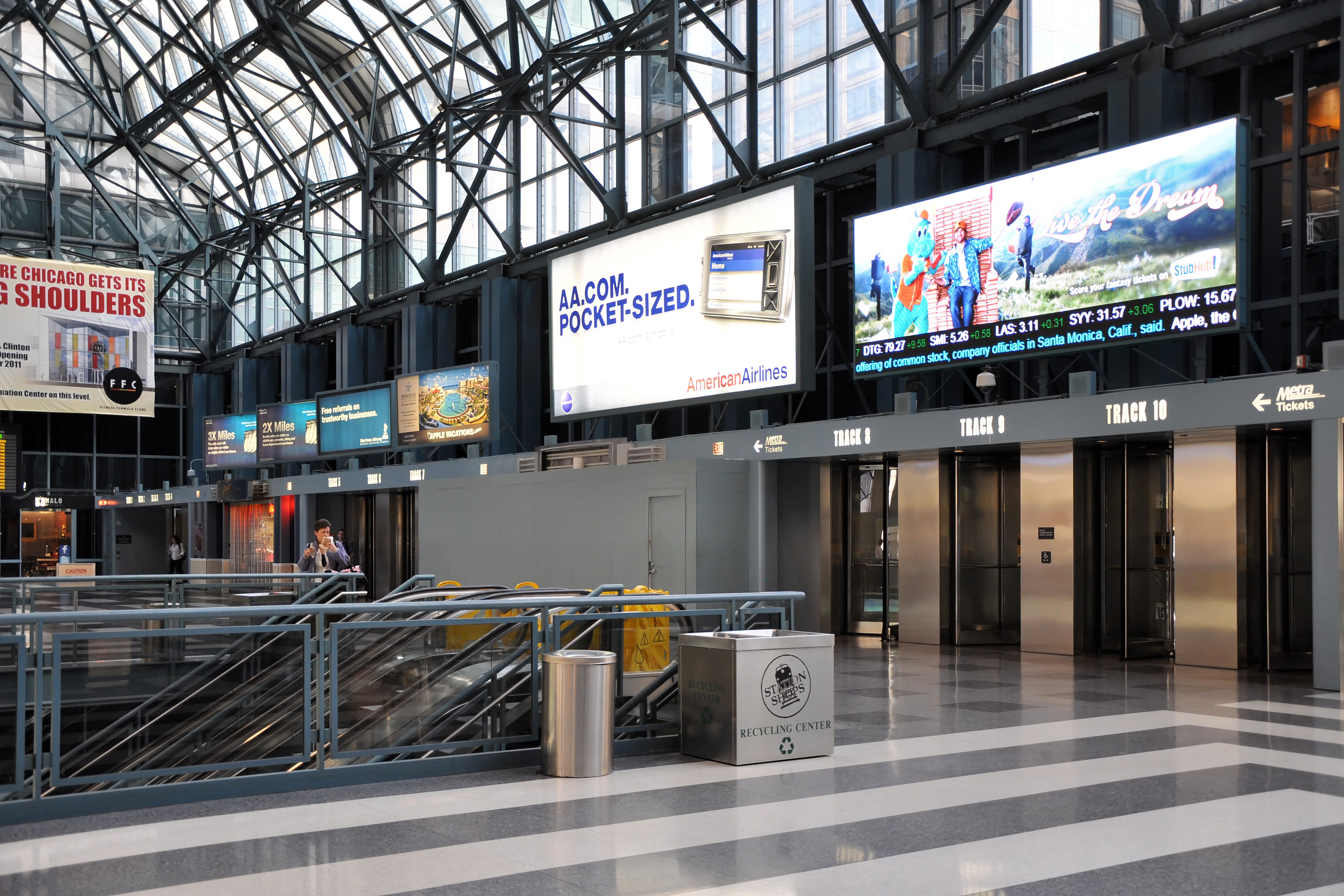
- Accenture Tower Ogilvie platform entrances in 2011

General information
- Location: 500 West Madison Street; Chicago, Illinois 60661; United States
- Coordinates: 41.88269°N 87.64029°W
- Owner: Union Pacific Railroad, Metra
- Platforms: 8 island platforms
- Tracks: 16
- Connections: Chicago "L": Green Pink at Clinton; Brown Orange Pink Purple at Washington/Wells; CTA Buses

Construction
- Accessible: Yes

Other information
- Fare zone: 1

History
- Opened: 1911–1912; 114 years ago
- Rebuilt: 1984–1987; 39 years ago
- Former names: Chicago and North Western Terminal/North Western Station (1911–1997)

Passengers
- 106,800 daily (Metra)

Services
Preceding station	Metra	Following station
Clybourn toward Kenosha	Union Pacific North	Terminus
Clybourn toward Harvard or McHenry	Union Pacific Northwest	Terminus
Kedzie toward Elburn	Union Pacific West	Terminus
Former services
Preceding station	Chicago and North Western Railway	Following station
Kedzie toward Omaha	Main Line	Terminus
Kedzie toward Geneva	Galena Division	Terminus
Evanston toward Minneapolis	Chicago – Minneapolis via Milwaukee	Terminus
Clybourn toward Milwaukee	Milwaukee Division	Terminus
Clybourn toward Minneapolis	Chicago – Minneapolis via Madison	Terminus
Clybourn toward Crystal Lake	Wisconsin Division	Terminus
Preceding station	Chesapeake and Ohio Railway	Following station
Terminus	Pere Marquette Railway; Main Line (1969–1971)	63rd Street toward Grand Rapids
Preceding station	Baltimore and Ohio Railroad	Following station
Terminus	Main Line (1969–1971)	63rd Street toward Baltimore Camden
Track layout
Location

The Richard B. Ogilvie Transportation Center (/ˈoʊɡəlviː/), also known as Chicago OTC, and located on the site of the former Chicago and North Western Terminal, is a commuter rail terminal in downtown Chicago, Illinois, United States. For the last century, this site has served as the primary terminal for the Chicago and North Western Railway and its successors Union Pacific and Metra. Intercity services had disappeared by the 1970s, but commuter services on the three ex-C&NW mainlines, Metra's UP District lines, continue to terminate here. The tracks are elevated above street level. The old C&NW terminal building was replaced in the mid-1980s with a modern skyscraper, the 500 West Madison Street building. The modern building occupies two square city blocks, bounded by Randolph Street and Madison Street to the north and south and by Canal Street and Clinton Street to the east and west. It is the second busiest rail station in Chicago, after nearby Union Station, the sixth-busiest railway station in North America, and the third-busiest station (after Grand Central Terminal and Jamaica station in New York City) that exclusively serves commuter traffic.

== History ==
=== The 1911 station ===
The Chicago and North Western Railway built the Chicago and North Western Terminal in 1911 to replace its Wells Street Station across the North Branch of the Chicago River. The new station, in the Renaissance Revival style, was designed by Frost and Granger, also the architects for the 1903 LaSalle Street Station.

The Tyler & Hippach Mirror Company Factory was moved 168 feet east and 52 feet south to make room for the station's construction. At the time, this was the largest building ever moved.

The station's 16 tracks were elevated above street level and "reached by six approach tracks and sheltered under an 894-foot-long (272 m) Bush train shed." The upper level of the head house housed a concourse and other facilities for intercity passengers, including "dressing rooms, baths, nurses and matrons rooms, and a doctor's office". The centerpiece of the upper level was a stately waiting room, measuring 201 by 202 feet (61 by 62 m), and rising 84 feet (26 m) to its barrel vaulted ceiling. In addition to the main concourse on the upper level, there was a street-level concourse for commuters.

During the heyday of rail travel, the Chicago and North Western Terminal was home to the C&NW's trains to Milwaukee, Minneapolis-St Paul, Madison and other cities of the upper Midwest, including the railroad's premier 400 series of trains. Until October 30, 1955, it was also the Chicago terminus of the trains the Union Pacific ran in conjunction with the C&NW, including the Overland Limited and the famed City trains (City of San Francisco, City of Los Angeles, Portland Rose) (operations of all Union Pacific intercity passenger trains would be turned over to the C&NW's rival, the Milwaukee Road). Other less famous trains such as the Corn King Special (Omaha), Viking (Milwaukee, Green Bay, and Minneapolis/St Paul), and Columbine (Denver). In 1939, there were 38 inter-city departures each business day.

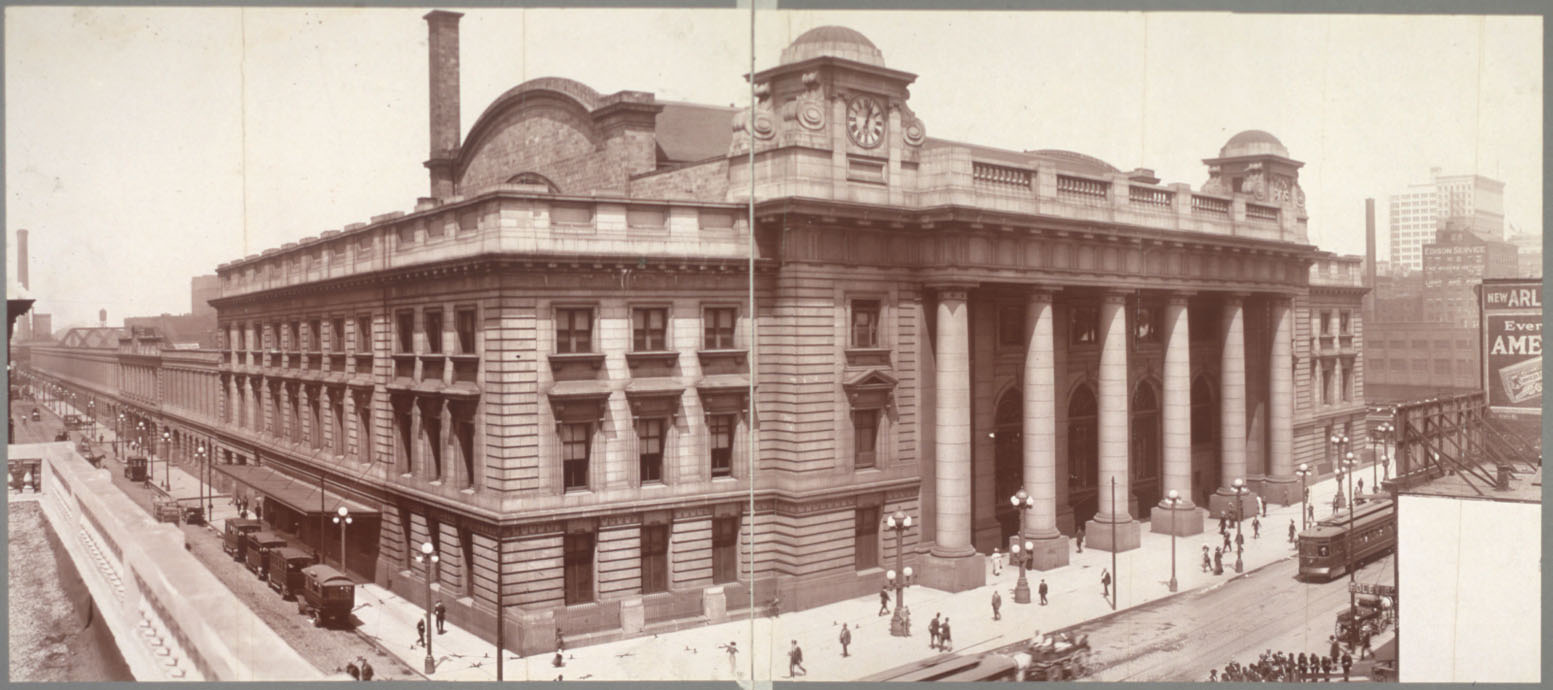
CNW Terminal c. 1912

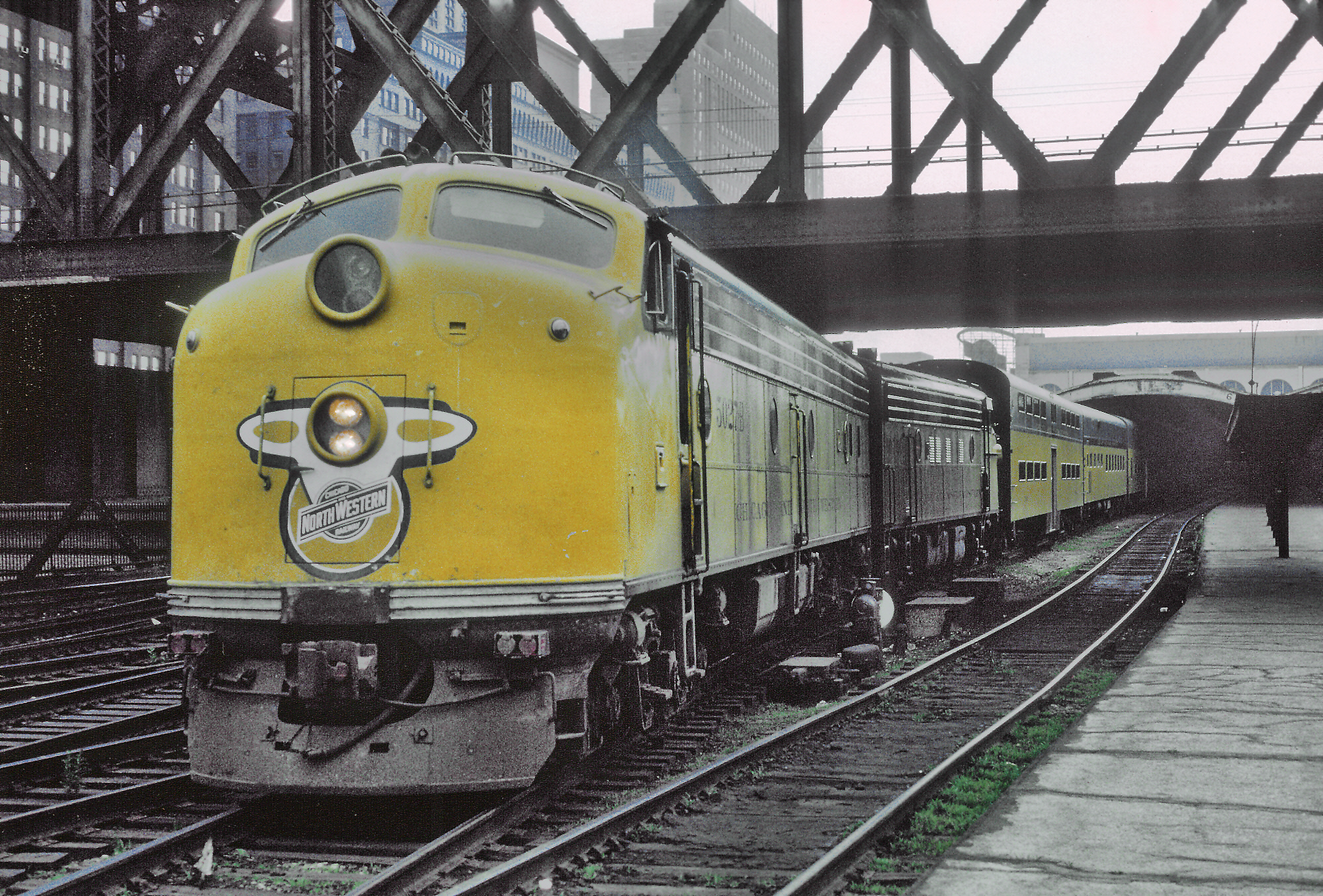
C&NW train in July 1964

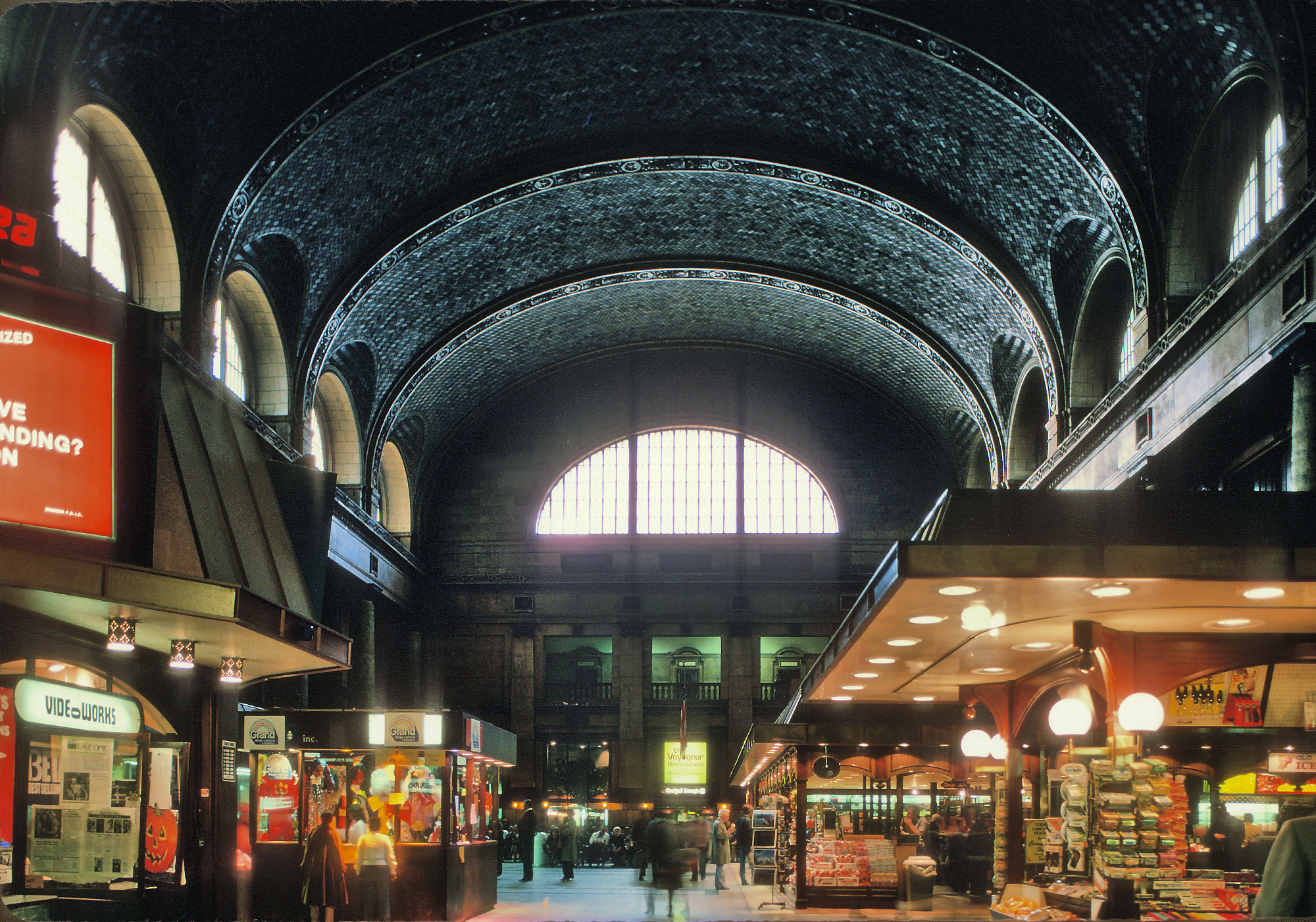
Interior in 1981

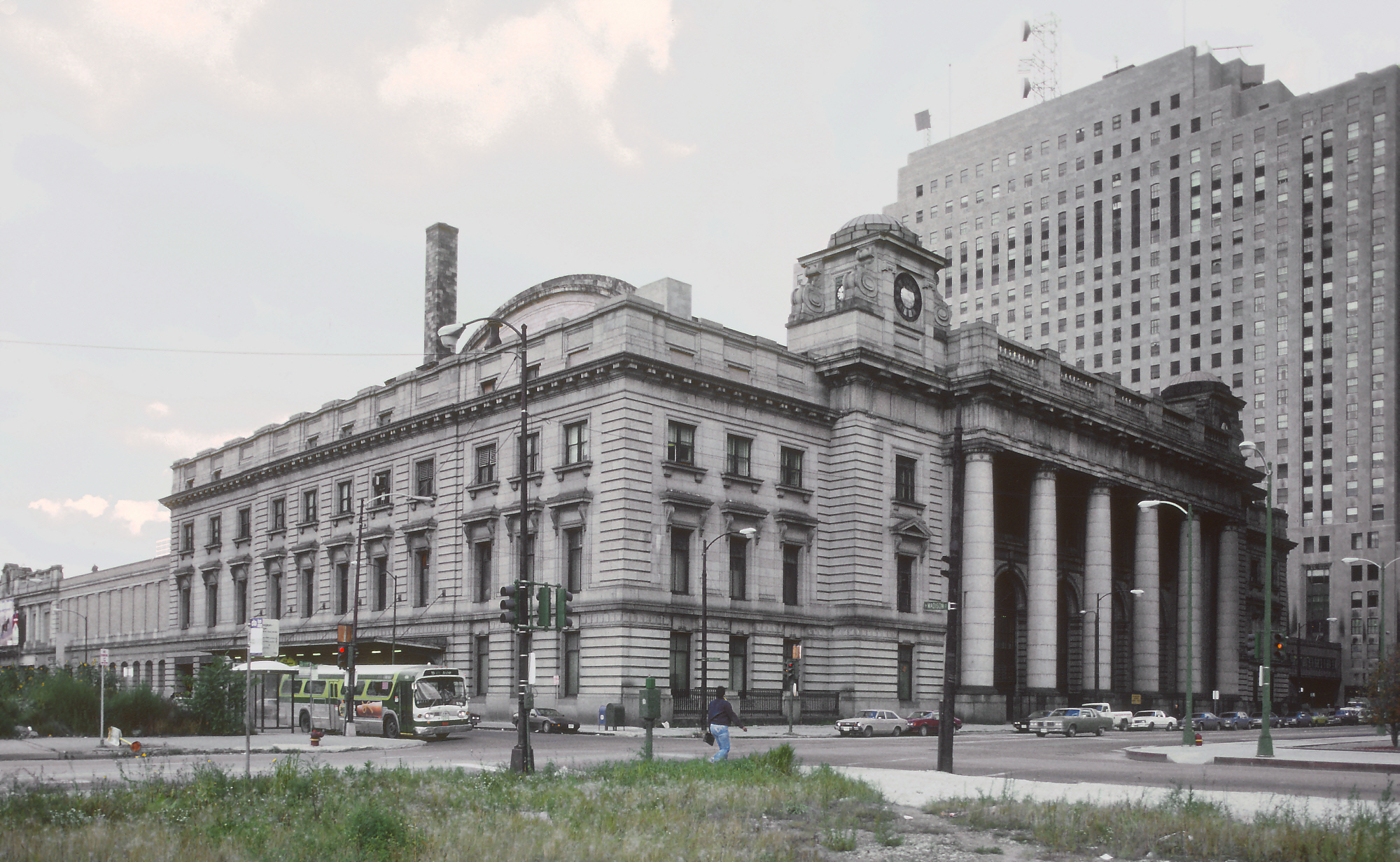
Terminal in November 1981

=== The 1984 station ===
In 1984, the head house was razed and replaced with the glass-and-steel 42-story Citicorp Center (now Accenture Tower), which was completed three years later in 1987. Metra service was maintained with only minor interruptions during construction – following the example of the demolition and replacement of New York Penn Station.

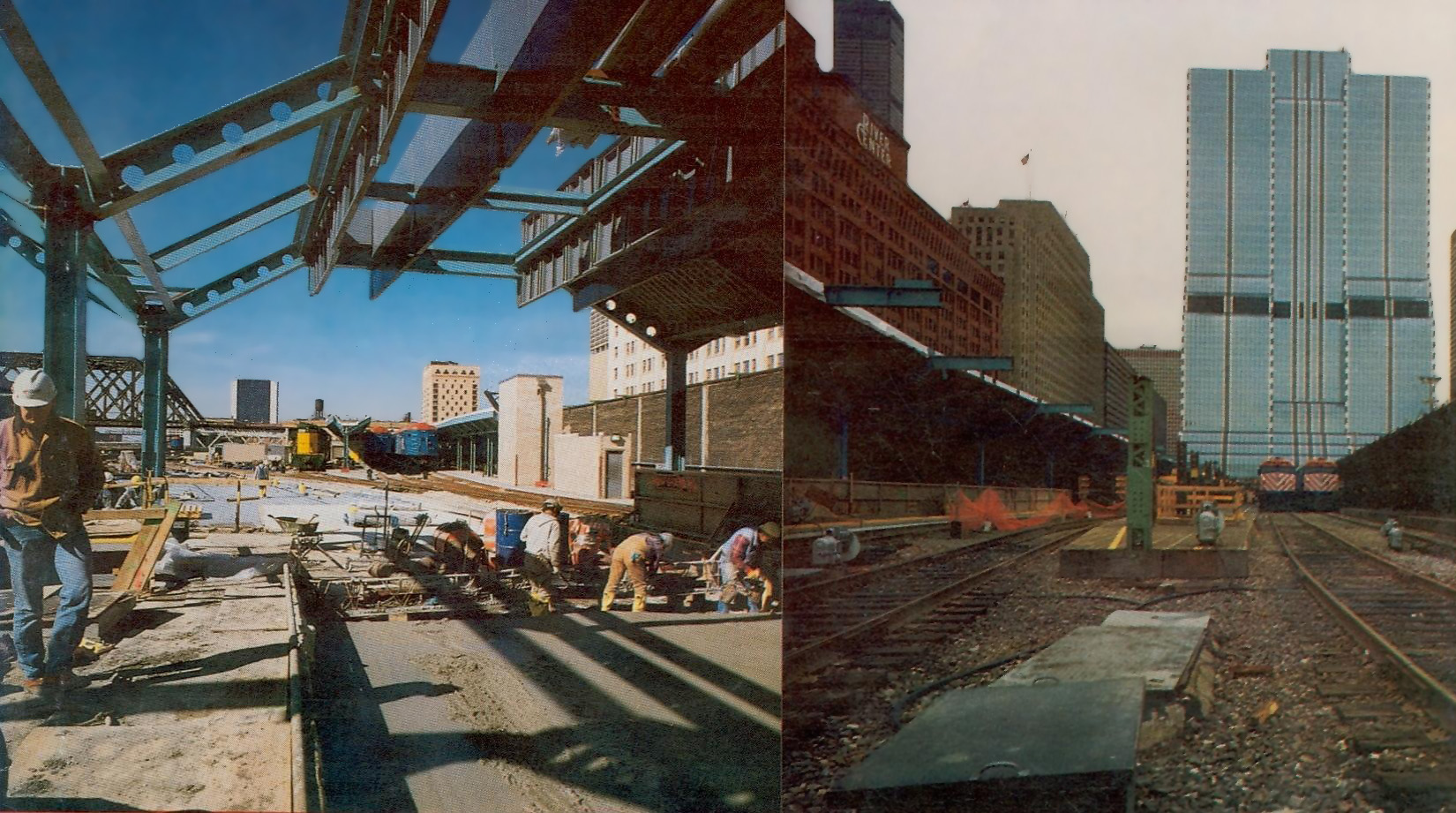
Rehabilitation progress in 1994

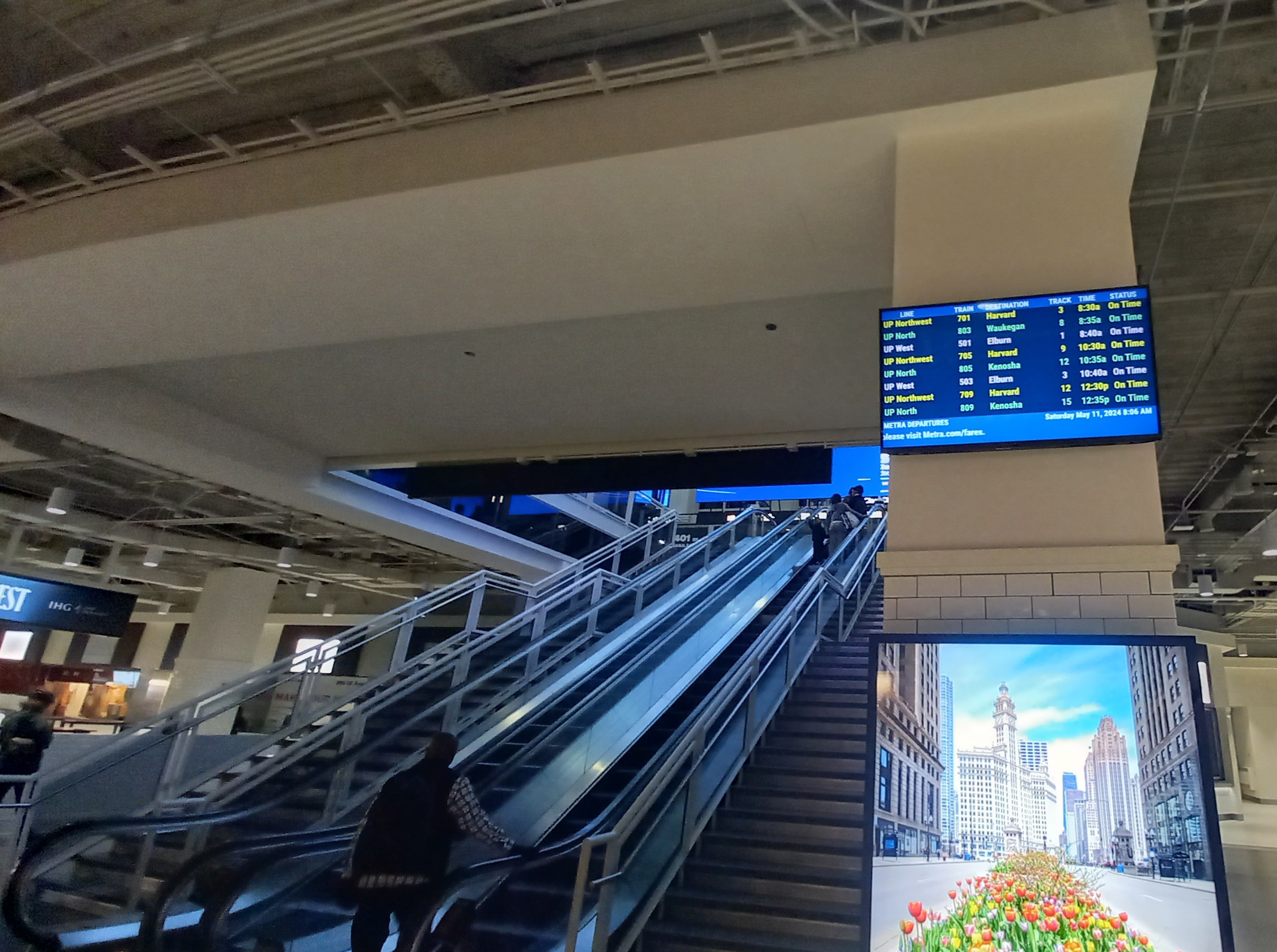
Escalators inside the Accenture Tower leading to train boarding area, with a Metra departures display screen in the foreground.

=== 1991 rehabilitation ===
In 1991, Metra purchased the train shed from Chicago and North Western and conducted a survey to determine the condition. The examination included necessary repairs to improve its structural integrity and redesign measures to bring the station up to modern mass-commuting standards. After completing a thorough evaluation, Metra, the Urban Mass Transportation Administration, and the Illinois Department of Transportation decided to completely replace the existing structure and in 1992, with the assistance of Federal funding, a contractor and management team were selected to begin the work.

Many engineering challenges had to be addressed and resolved, not only because of the train shed's prominent location but also due to its high traffic volume as it was to remain operational to 45,000 daily commuters during the project. Such challenges included the removal of original lead paint, the complete replacement of all 16 tracks which served 200 trains a day, extensive structural steel repairs (under load), erection of a new steel canopy, complete exterior masonry restoration, new electrical and plumbing systems, and construction of a new pedestrian concourse. During the rehabilitation project, which lasted four years and cost $138 million, over 60 contractors spent more than 800,000 man-hours performing repairs and producing new construction.

The station was renamed the Richard B. Ogilvie Transportation Center in 1997, two years after the C&NW merged into the Union Pacific Railroad, after Richard B. Ogilvie, a board member of the Milwaukee Road and former Governor of Illinois. Many longtime Chicago-area residents still call it "North Western Station", and many longtime employees simply call it "CPT" – short for "Chicago Passenger Terminal". On-board announcements refer to the station as "Chicago OTC" and the timetables and real-time train trackers refer to it as "Ogilvie (OTC)".

In May 2025, Union Pacific officially transferred the operations of the UP-N, UP-NW, and UP-W lines to Metra, ending the purchase-of-service agreement inherited from the C&NW days. While the services themselves will be operated directly by Metra, Union Pacific will continue to own and dispatch the tracks in and out of the station, including Lake Street Tower.

== Platforms and tracks ==
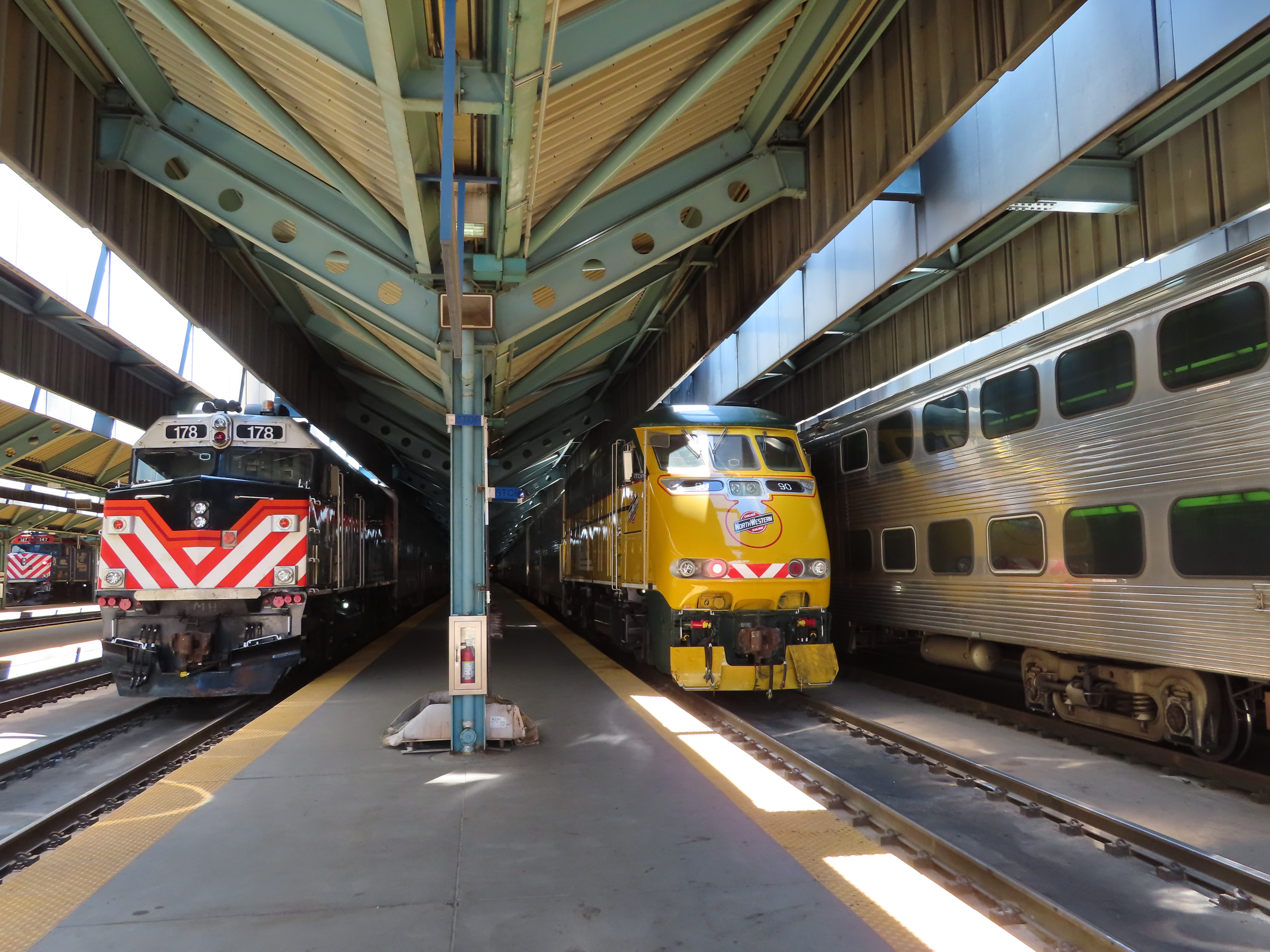
Metra trains parked at Ogilvie Transportation Center, including the C&NW Heritage Unit

The station has 16 tracks with eight island platforms, each island platform servicing two tracks. Not all the platforms are the same length; the platforms on the western part of the station (tracks 1–10) are significantly longer than the eastern platforms. In general, West Line trains depart from the western platforms (roughly tracks 1–5), Northwest Line trains depart from the middle tracks (6–10), and North Line trains depart from the eastern tracks (11–15). (Track 16 is seldom used by revenue trains.) This is done so that departing and arriving trains do not have to make large switch movements, which would block the use of other tracks and prevent multiple trains from arriving and departing at the same time. Just north of the station, the number of tracks reduces from 16 to six. Switches allow for trains on any of the 16 station tracks to end up on any of these six tracks, and vice versa. About a third of a mile from the station, the six tracks split into two mainlines of four tracks. One mainline turns west, while the other turns northwest. West Line trains take the west tracks, while Northwest and North Line trains take the northwest tracks. Out-of-service trains use the west mainline to access yards and maintenance facilities.

== Services ==
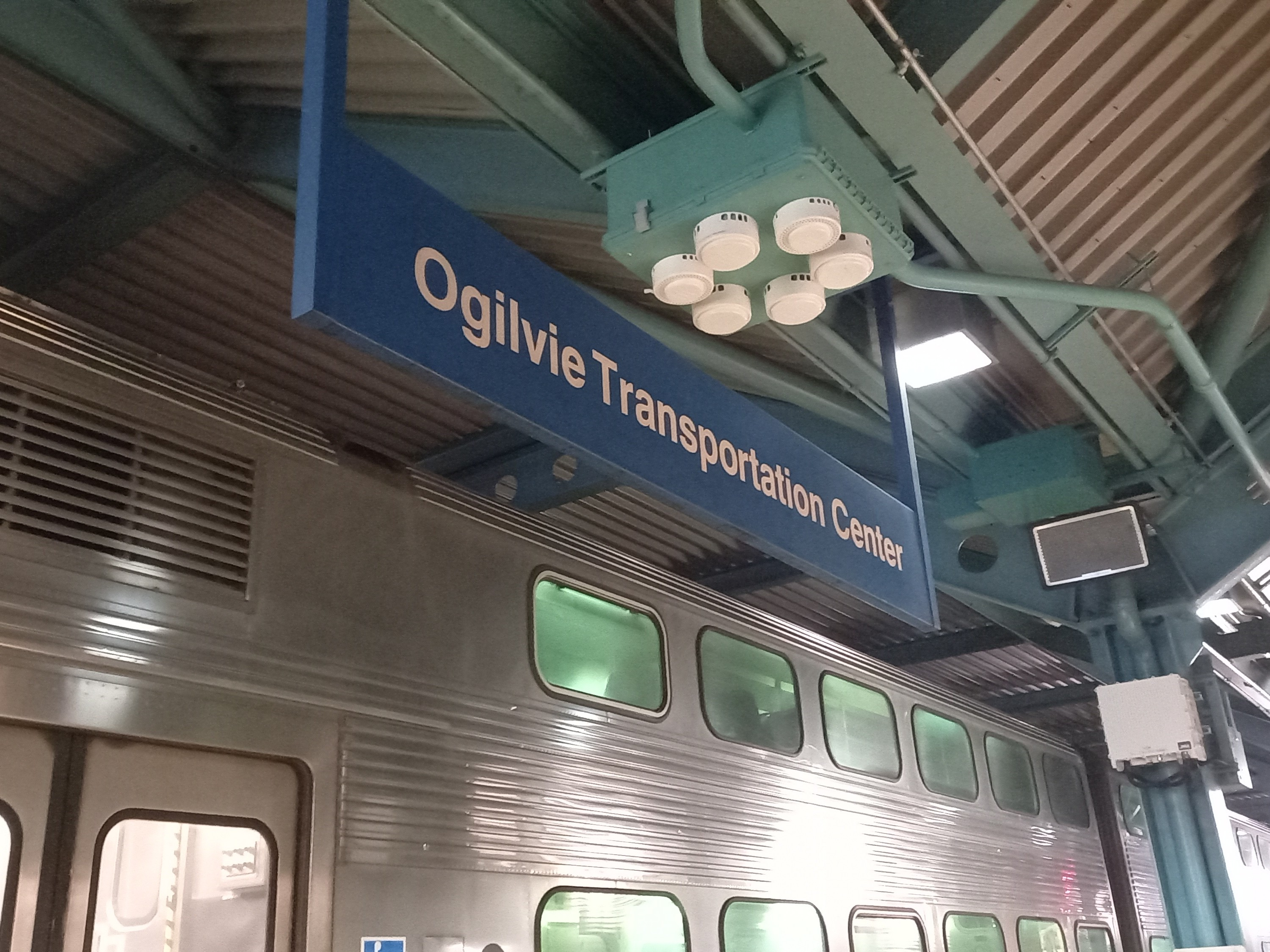
Platform sign

The Chicago and North Western Terminal has served as a terminal for all the commuter and intercity trains of the Chicago and North Western Railway. In addition, on November 9, 1969, the day after Grand Central Station closed, the Baltimore and Ohio Railroad and Pere Marquette Railway, Grand Central's two remaining users, moved their remaining intercity services into the C&NW's terminal. Those trains, which used the C&NW's branch to the St. Charles Air Line west of Western Avenue, last ran on April 30, 1971, the day before Amtrak took over most intercity passenger trains in the U.S. Amtrak services over the lines of those two railroads have run into Union Station.

=== Metra commuter rail services ===
- to Kenosha, WI
- to Harvard, IL and McHenry, IL
- to Elburn, IL

Metra's three Union Pacific District lines – the Union Pacific North Line, Union Pacific Northwest Line and Union Pacific West Line – now provide regular commuter rail service along three former C&NW lines. In Metra's zone-based fare schedule, Ogilvie is in Zone 1. More than 106,000 people board Metra trains at Ogilvie Transportation Center each day. Prior to May 2025, Union Pacific, and its Midwestern predecessor, the C&NW, operated Metra trains on the Ogilvie routes via "purchase-of-service" agreements (Metra supplies its commuter trains to C&NW/UP personnel who operate them). In 2023, UP announced that it would transfer the operation of commuter trains to the Metra system itself in 2024, but the transition was delayed a year, and was finalized in May 2025. UP continues dispatching, owning and maintaining the three right of ways originating from the Ogilvie station.

== Traffic statistics ==
Rank	Route	Daily passengers (weekday)
1	UP-N to Kenosha	41,000
2	UP-NW to Harvard/McHenry	38,600
3	UP-W to Elburn	27,200

== Bus and "L" connections ==
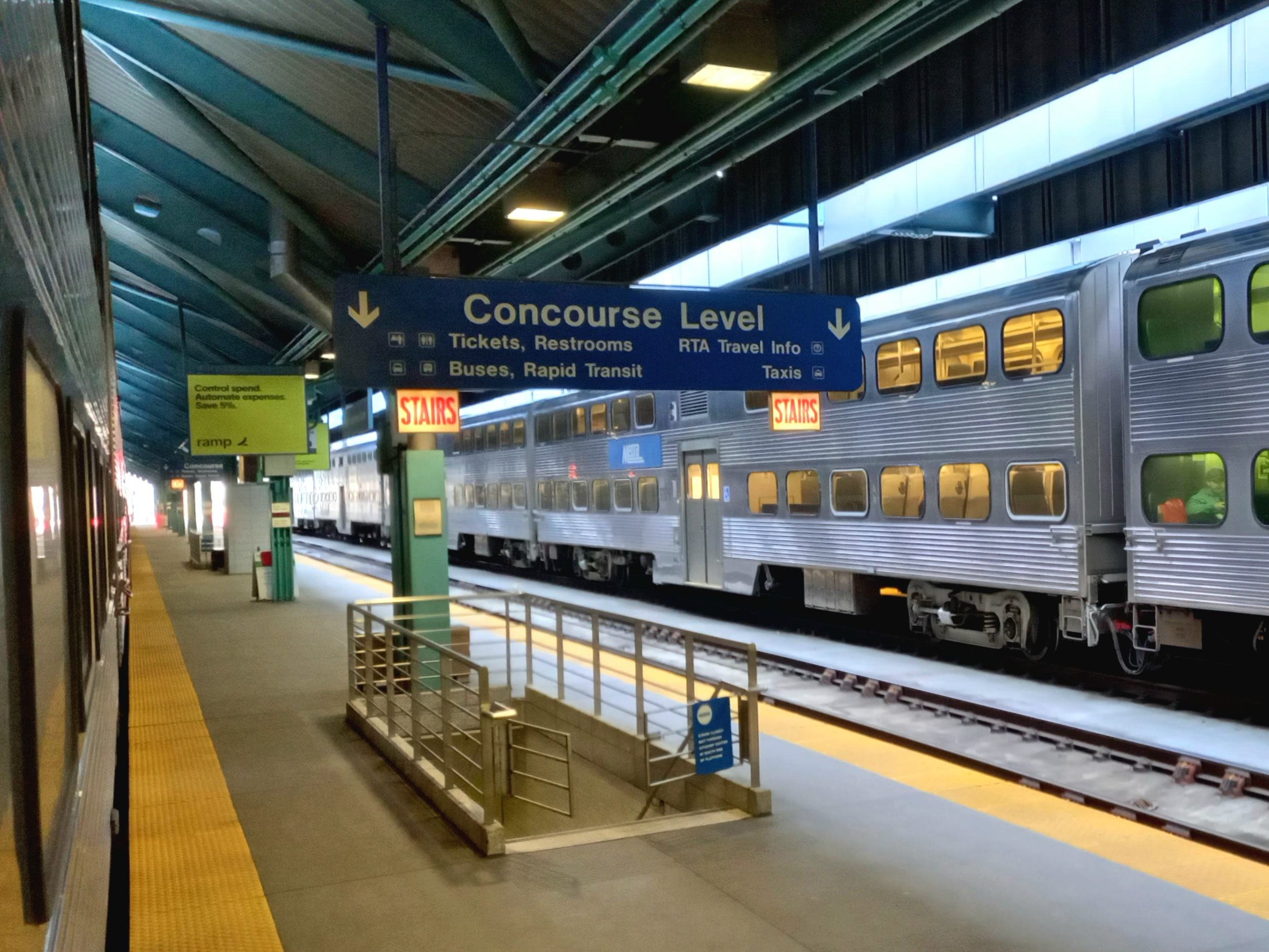
All platforms have two sets of stairs leading down to the Concourse Level, which houses the MetraMarket retail area.

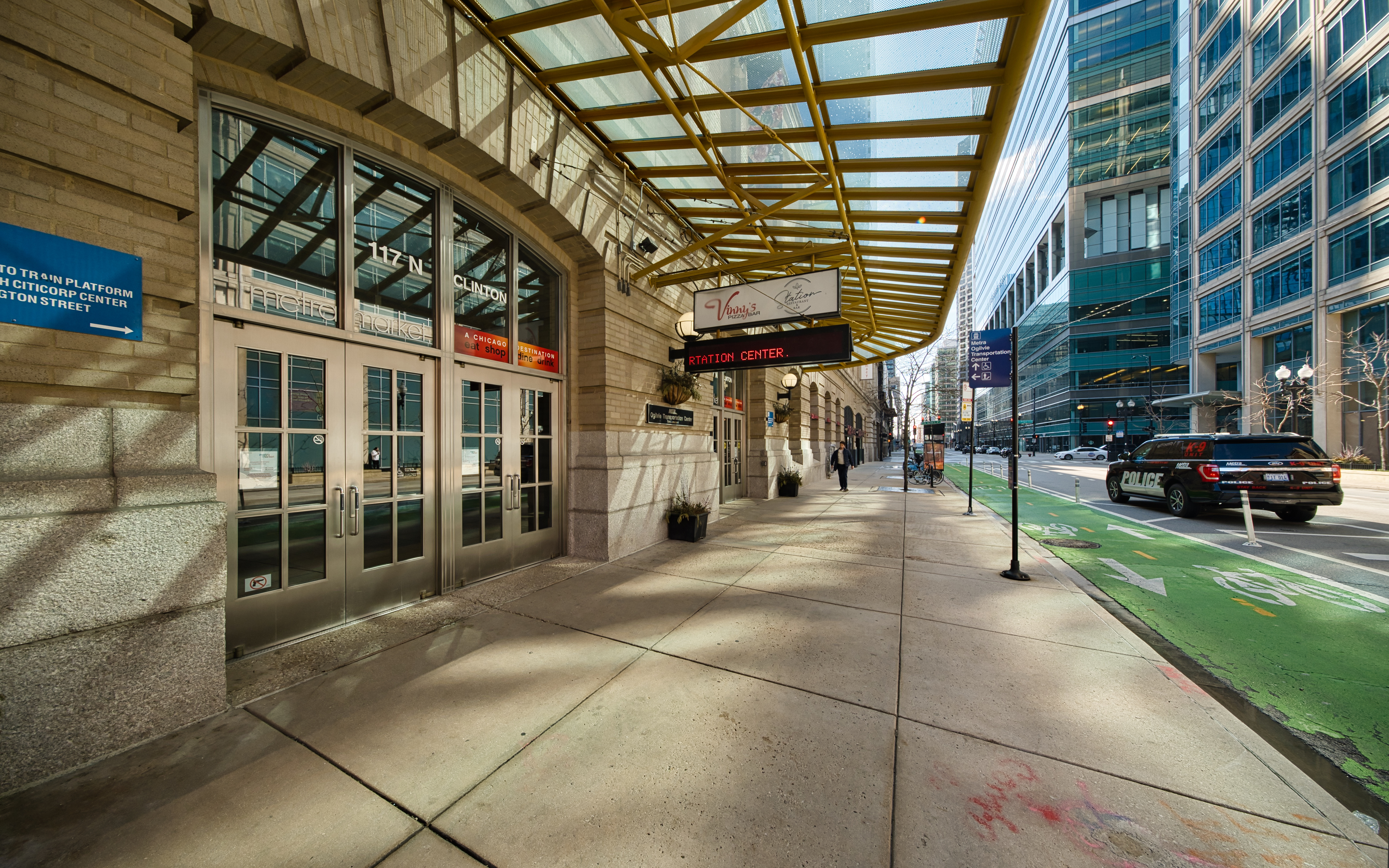
Clinton Street entrance to the Concourse Level. This entrance is one block away from the Clinton/Lake CTA "L" station.

Bus connections can be made on Madison Street or Washington Boulevard via the Citigroup Center or through a lower level concourse accessible by the track platforms between Washington Boulevard and Randolph Street with entrances at Canal and Clinton Streets. Connections can also be made at the Union Station bus terminal via an entrance to Union Station's north concourse on Madison Street.

Ogilvie offers two connections to the Chicago Transit Authority's "L" system. It is next door to Clinton station; Ogilvie's platforms directly abut Clinton. Ogilvie is three blocks west of Washington/Wells station.

CTA buses

- J14 Jeffery Jump
- 19 United Center Express
- 56 Milwaukee
- 60 Blue Island/26th (Owl Service)
- 120 Ogilvie/Streeterville Express
- 124 Navy Pier
- 125 Water Tower Express
- 126 Jackson
- 128 Soldier Field Express
- 130 Museum Campus
- 157 Streeterville/Taylor
- 192 University of Chicago Hospitals Express

== Major intercity trains before Amtrak ==
Except from November 1969 to April 1971, only the Chicago and North Western Railway used their terminal.

Chicago & North Western trains

- North Western Limited
- Twin Cities 400
- Flambeau 400
- Minnesota 400 and its successors the Dakota 400 and Rochester 400
- Kate Shelley 400

Union Pacific/Chicago and North Western trains

- Overland Limited
- Challengers
- City of San Francisco
- City of Los Angeles
- City of Portland
- City of Denver
- Gold Coast

== See also ==
- List of busiest railway stations in North America
- List of historical passenger rail services in Chicago for other passenger railroad terminals in downtown Chicago
