= Edgebrook =

Edgebrook can refer to:

- Forest Glen, Chicago#Edgebrook, a section of Forest Glen, Chicago, Illinois
  - Edgebrook station
- Edgebrook, Mercer County, New Jersey
- Edgebrook, Middlesex County, New Jersey
