= Albanians in Chicago =

There are 14,300 Albanian Americans in Illinois, 0.1% of the state's population, slightly above the national average of 0.07%. While still a small proportion of the population, Albanian Americans have contributed significantly to the food scene of Chicagoland, especially in the pizza and Italian cuisine industry. While Albanians often open up restaurants and markets that serve Albanian and Balkan cuisine and flare, they have a finesse in the Italian-style pasta and pizza industry.

== History and distribution ==
To avoid service in the Turkish War due to Albania being under Ottoman Empire rule, groups of Albanians came to the US in the late 1800s. By 1914 approximately 1,000 Albanians resided in greater Chicago and northern Illinois. Most worked in factories, restaurants, or the construction industry. According to 2018-2022 Census estimates, there are approximately 6,500 Albanian immigrants residing in Illinois, with the majority living in Cook (3,000) and DuPage (2,500) Counties. This represents roughly 6% of all Albanian immigrants in the country.

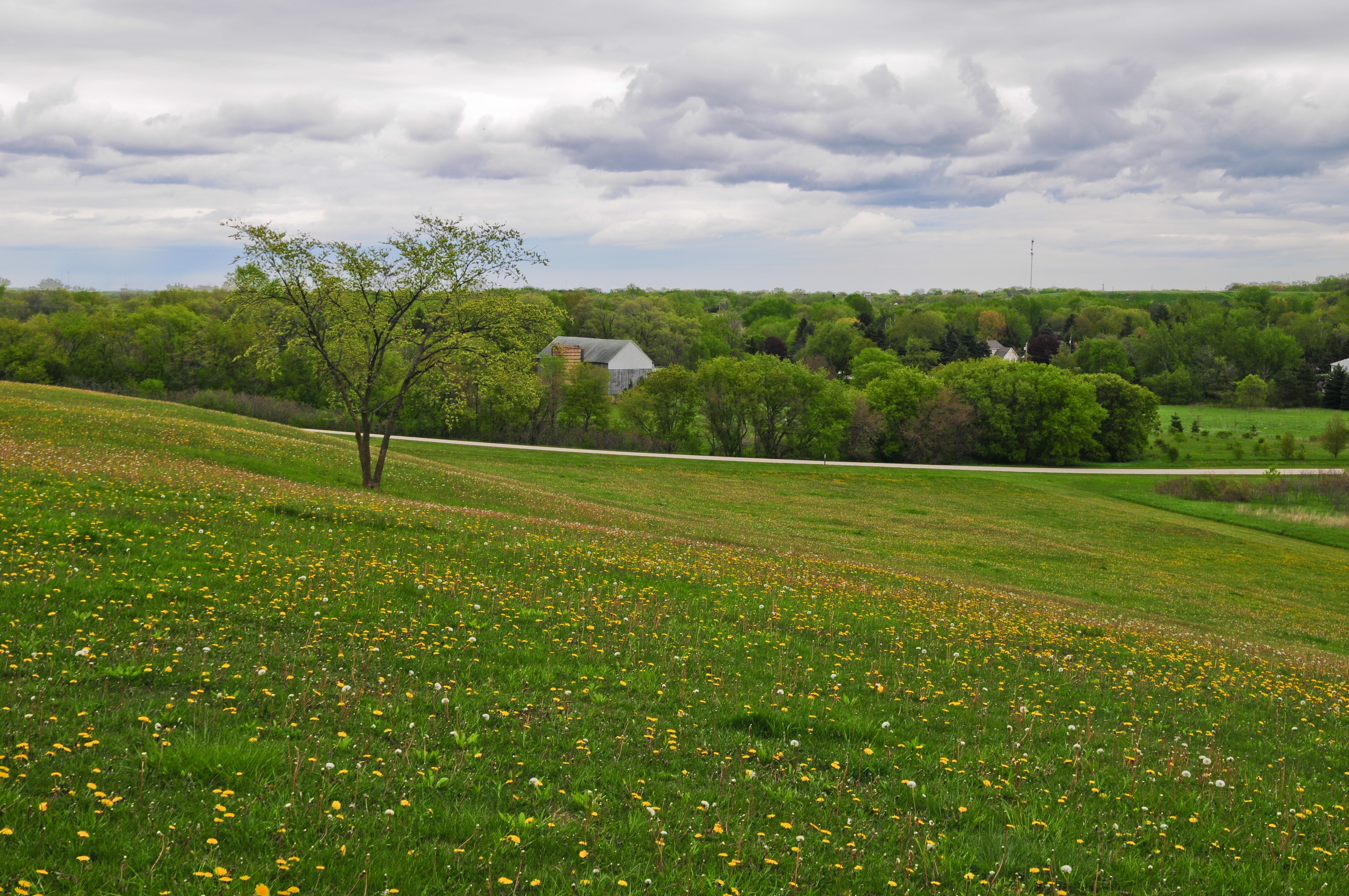
The exurban countryside community of Minooka is home to a rife Albanian community.

In Chicago proper, there are 2,400 ethnic Albanian residents. The 60646 and 60630 zip codes have 400 and 300 Albanians recorded as per a 2020s-recorded U.S. Census Bureau data estimate distributed via ZipAtlas.com; both zip codes are located in the northwest side of Chicago neighborhoods of Jefferson Park, Chicago, Forest Glen, Chicago, and Sauganash, Chicago.

Naperville, Lombard, Schiller Park, Arlington Heights, and Minooka all have sizable Albanian populations numbering over 500 ethnically Albanian individuals in each city. Smaller suburban communities such as Palos Hills, Burr Ridge, Streamwood, Addison, Elmwood Park, Palatine, Glendale Heights, Oswego, and Glen Ellyn also have Albanian populations which accumulate to very near one percent or surpassing that figure of said cities' populations.

== Organizations and community centers ==
The Albanian-American Community of Illinois is a Downtown Chicago-based non-profit organization that helps serve the Albanian community of Greater Chicago.

The Albanian-American Women's Association of Greater Chicago is based in Hinsdale.

== Places of worship ==
There is also an Albanian American Islamic Center, which proclaims that Chicago has the largest concentration of Albanian Muslims in the U.S.; there is a Weekend school that teaches children the Albanian language.

The St. Nicholas Albanian Orthodox Church serves Albanian Christian communities.

== Schools ==
The Albanian Orthodox Church has an establishment in Chicago, where language lessons are taught.

There are Albanian language classes for children offered at the St. Nicholas Church.

The Shkolla Shqipe 'Kongresi i Manastirit' Albanian School is an Albanian cultural and linguistic immersion elementary school in Berkeley, Illinois. The Hidai Eddie Bregu Program Of Albanian Studies is offered at DePaul University.

== Notable people ==
- Actors John Belushi and Jim Belushi, as well as Jim's son, Robert Belushi
