= Wildwood, Chicago =

Coordinates: 42.0062°N 87.7859°W

- Neighborhood
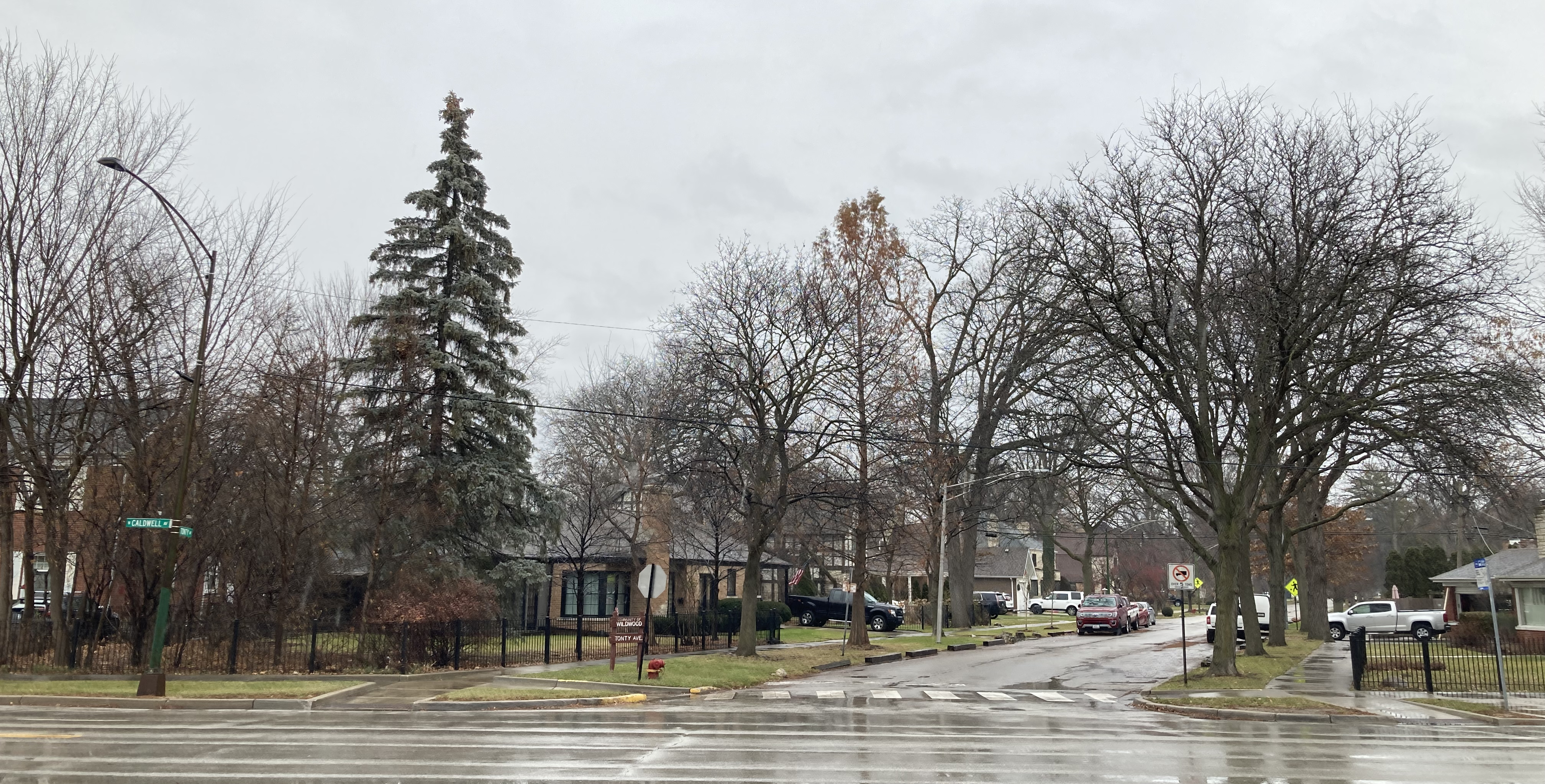

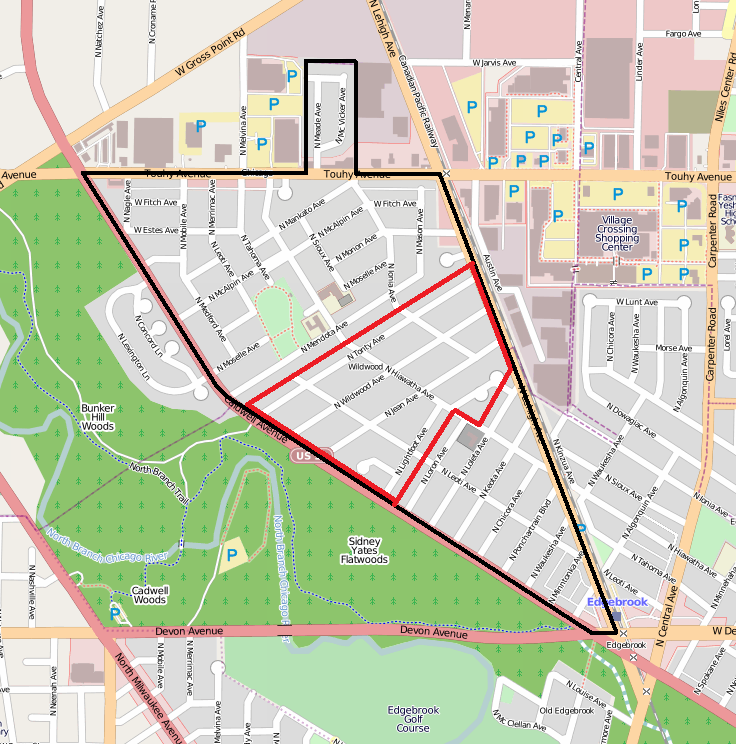
- Map of Wildwood
- Country: United States
- City: Chicago
- Community areas: Forest Glen
- ZIP code: 60646

Wildwood is a local community and neighborhood located in the Edgebrook and Forest Glen Community Area on the Far Northwest side of Chicago, Illinois.

The original boundaries, still marked with wooden signs, sit between the neighborhoods, North Edgebrook to the north and Edgebrook Manor to the south. It was annexed into Chicago from Niles Township on 8 April 1924. The community often combines the other named area's into one distinct area of Edgebrook. It was once known as the Suburb inside Chicago. The most notable features of Wildwood are rustic, including curb-less streets and massive trees towering above the homes. A satellite view of Wildwood compared to other nearby Chicago communities shows its number of trees.

== Neighborhoods ==
=== Edgebrook Manor ===
Edgebrook Manor was annexed into Chicago from Niles Township on 7 November 1922. Its area is bordered by parcels on Loron Avenue and Loleta Avenue to the north, Lehigh Avenue to the East. Devon Avenue to the south, and Caldwell Ave to the West.

=== North Edgebrook ===
North Edgebrook is the northernmost section of Forest Glen. It was annexed into Chicago from Niles Township on 28 May 1928. It is bordered by parcels on Touhy and Sherwin Avenue to the north, Lehigh Avenue to the east, parcels on Mendota Avenue to the south, and Caldwell Avenue (Route 14) to the west.

== Area Features ==
Wildwood provides the entrance to Bunker Hill Forest Preserve and the North Branch Bicycle Trail (ending at the Botanical Gardens in Glencoe, Illinois). The community of Wildwood contains a few businesses or rental options along Touhy Avenue and Devon Avenue, but is primarily a community of single-family homes.

=== Transportation ===
The Edgebrook Metra Station sits along Lehigh Avenue, at the intersection of Caldwell and Devon Avenues.

=== Schools and Churches ===
Edgebrook Community Church, St Mary of the Woods Church and School, Evangelical Student Fellowship International Church, and Wildwood Elementary School. Wildwood Elementary is now known as Wildwood World Magnet School after undergoing extensive renovations.

=== Wildwood Park ===
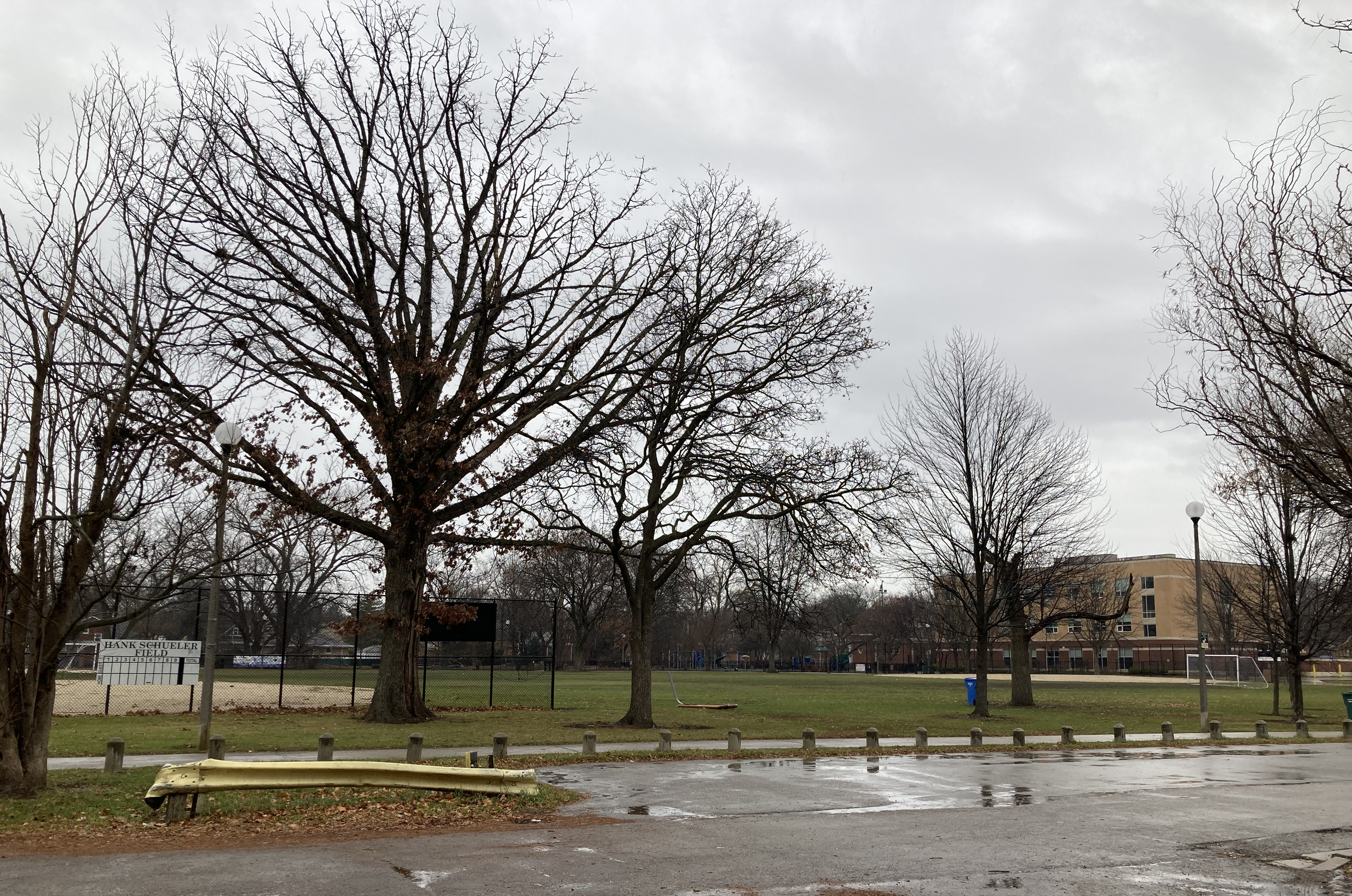
Wildwood Park

Wildwood Park (6950 N. Hiawatha Ave), which is located in North Edgebrook section of Wildwood, contains one senior and two junior baseball fields, a softball field, a combo football soccer field, two tennis courts, and one playground combined with a natural play area. Wildwood Park is also known for its Junior Bears football team, the Wildwood Seminoles. Youth in 6th, 7th, and 8th grade can participate in Junior Bears or the cheerleading program. Wildwood Park is active during the summer months, with multiple sports activities and kids' play happening simultaneously. Wildwood Community is host to a large Independence Day celebration with a parade through the streets to the party in Wildwood Park. Bob Cole, the long-time park director and Wildwood Packers football coach, made a "wall of fame" in the fieldhouse, featuring children of the neighborhood. Photos and news clippings cover the walls and ceilings, memorializing the community members who have contributed to the park. The gymnasium is shared with Wildwood School, where basketball, floor hockey, and recreational tumbling programs take place. There is also a veterans and a first responders memorial built by the community.
