= Old Edgebrook District =

Coordinates: 41°59′42″N 87°46′6″W

Old Edgebrook, Chicago
- Neighborhood
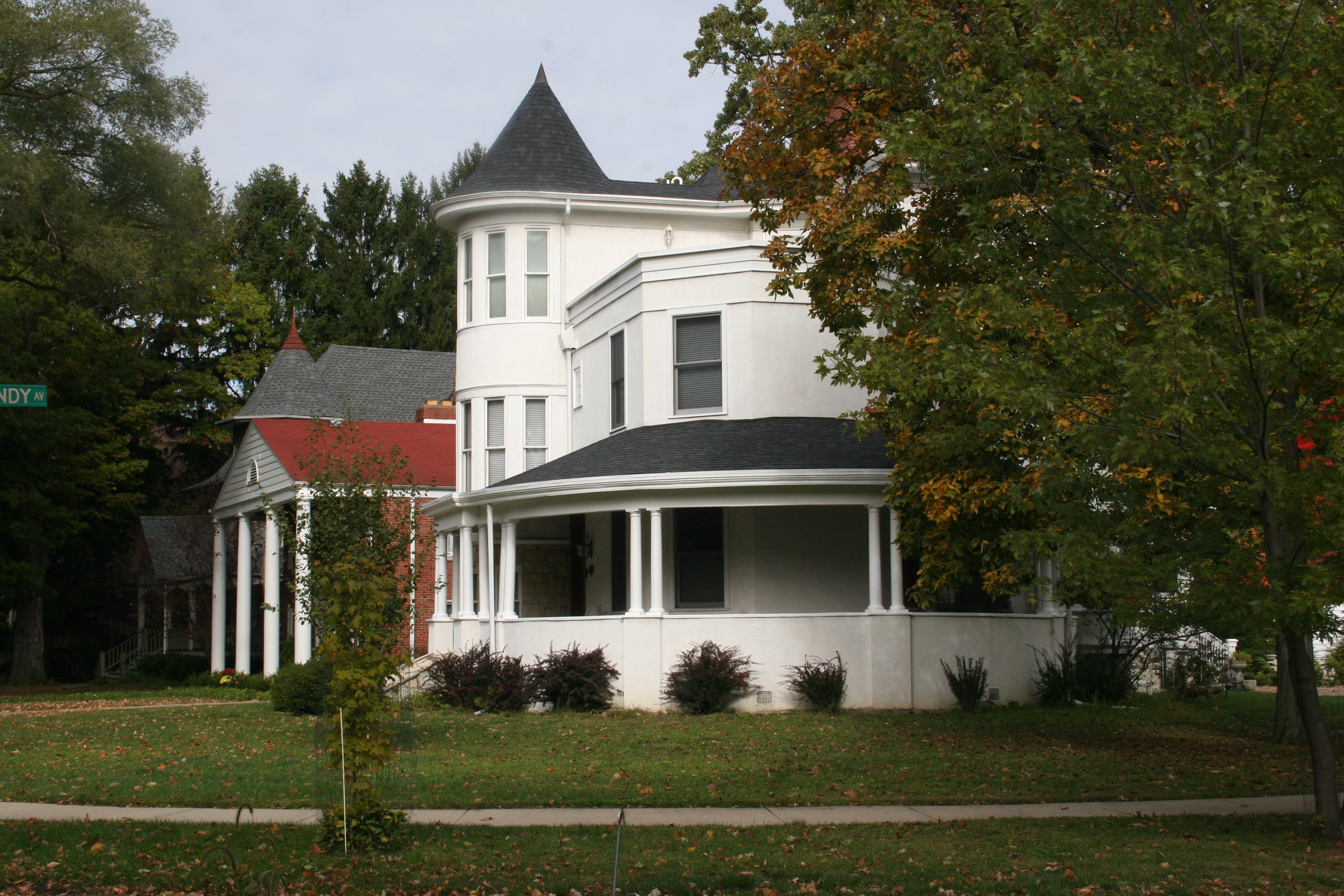
- Houses at McClellan and Lundy Avenues

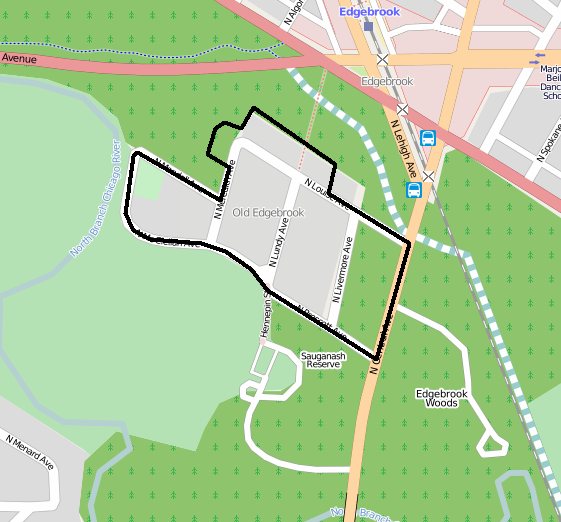
- Map of Old Edgebrook
- Country: United States
- City: Chicago, Illinois
- Community areas: Forest Glen
- First settled: 1894
- ZIP code: 60646

Old Edgebrook is a historic district and neighborhood in the Forest Glen community area of Chicago, Illinois, United States.

It is located between Central and Devon Avenues and the Edgebrook Golf Course. It is surrounded on all sides by Cook County Forest Preserves.

== History ==
The district's homes were first built in 1894 by various architects. Consisting of several blocks of large, stately houses, it was originally built for railroad executives.

It was designated a Chicago Landmark on December 14, 1988. The city erected a historical marker on a lamppost at the intersection of Prescott and Livermore avenues in honor of the historic district.

== Mary Burkemeier Quinn Park of Trees ==
The Mary Burkemeier Quinn Park of Trees is the only Park District property in Old Edgebrook. According to a plaque in the park, it was a gift from Edward M. Quinn, whose house formerly stood on the site, in memory of his wife Mary Burkemeier Quinn. His will instructed that his house be demolished, a minimum of 21 trees be planted on the property, and the property deed to be given to the Chicago Park District.
