= Montrose station (CTA Blue Line) =

Chicago "L" station

Montrose 4400N 4600W
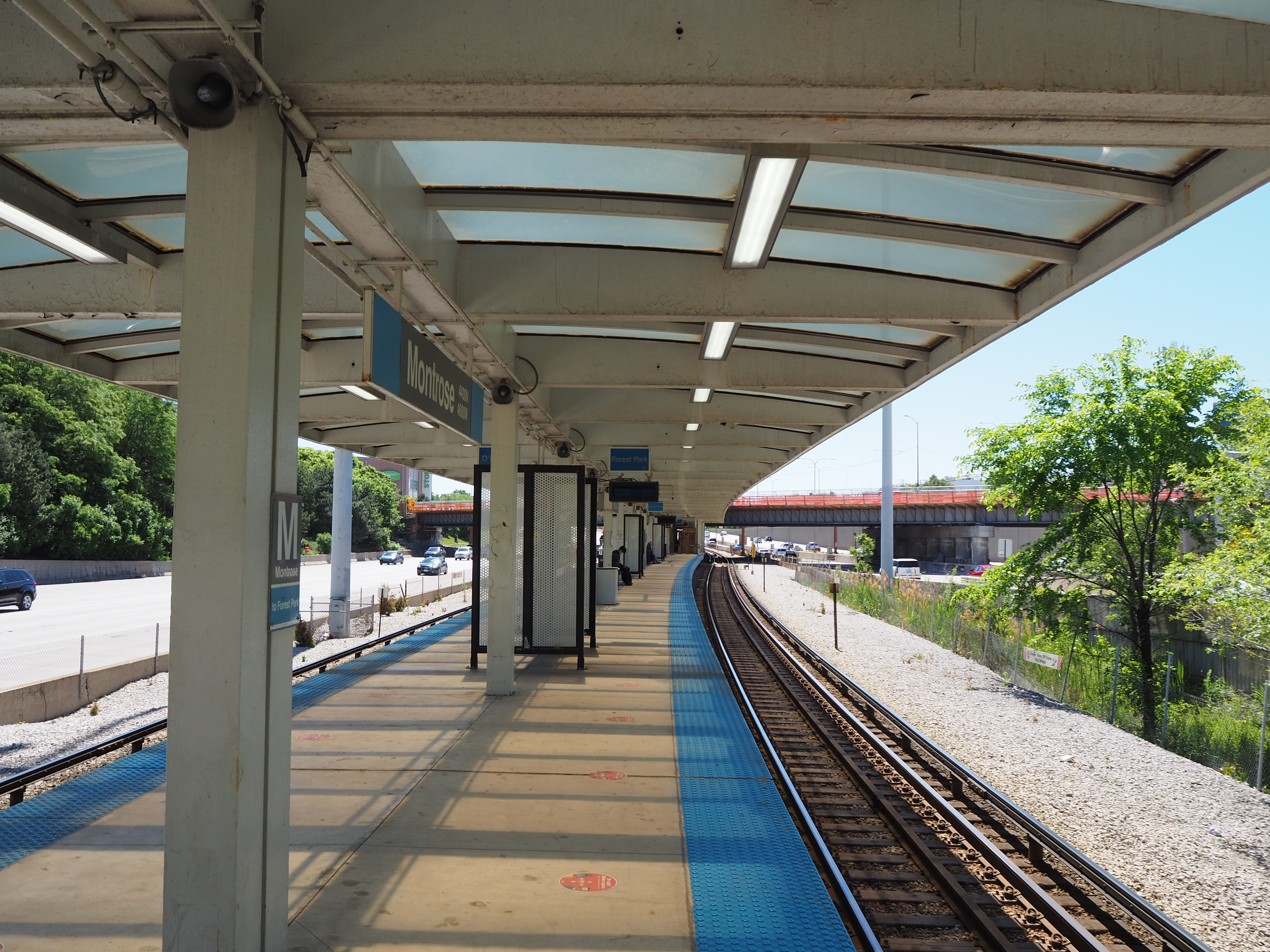

General information
- Location: 4600 West Montrose Avenue; Chicago, Illinois 60641
- Coordinates: 41.961539°N 87.743574°W
- Owner: Chicago Transit Authority
- Line: O'Hare Branch
- Platforms: 1 island platform
- Tracks: 2
- Connections: at Mayfair; CTA Bus

Construction
- Structure type: Expressway median
- Cycle facilities: Yes
- Accessible: No

History
- Opened: February 1, 1970; 56 years ago
- Rebuilt: 2016; 10 years ago

Passengers
- 2025: 528,457 ▲8.5%

Services
Preceding station	Chicago "L"	Following station
Jefferson Park toward O'Hare	Blue Line	Irving Park toward Forest Park
Track layout
Location

Montrose is a station on the Chicago Transit Authority's 'L' system, serving the Blue Line. The station serves the Irving Park, Mayfair, and Portage Park neighborhoods. Blue Line trains run at intervals of 2–7 minutes during rush hour, and take 22 minutes to travel to the Loop. The station is located in the median of the Kennedy Expressway. The station opened in 1970 as part of the Kennedy extension, connecting the Milwaukee Elevated from Logan Square to Jefferson Park.

A transfer is available to Metra's Milwaukee District North Line's Mayfair stop, just to the west of the station.

== Bus and rail connections ==
CTA

- 78 Montrose

Metra

- Milwaukee District North (at Mayfair)
