= Stateway Gardens, Chicago =

Coordinates: 41°49′38″N 87°37′40″W

- Neighborhood
- Interactive map of Stateway Gardens, Chicago
- Country: United States
- City: Chicago, Illinois
- Community areas: Douglas
- First settled: 1955

Stateway Gardens, now Park Boulevard, is a neighborhood located in the Douglas Community Area on the South side of Chicago, Illinois.

The neighborhood was named after the Chicago housing development, Stateway Gardens, that once took up most of the area. The buildings were overrun with crime and fell into disrepair. They were demolished in 2007. The area is now being redeveloped as Park Boulevard with small family sized housing units and condos.

== Parks ==
- Stateway Park

== Education ==
- Attucks Elementary School
