= Forest Glen station (Illinois) =

Commuter rail station in Chicago, Illinois

Forest Glen

- Inbound platform in November 2026

General information
- Location: 5310 North Forest Glen Avenue; Forest Glen, Chicago, Illinois 60630
- Coordinates: 41.9781°N 87.7556°W
- Line: C&M Subdivision
- Platforms: 2 side platforms
- Tracks: 2
- Connections: CTA Buses

Construction
- Structure type: Open shelter
- Parking: Yes
- Accessible: No

Other information
- Fare zone: 2

Passengers
- 2018: 376 (average weekday) ▲9.6%
- Rank: 126 out of 236

Services
Preceding station	Metra	Following station
Edgebrook toward Fox Lake	Milwaukee District North	Mayfair toward Union Station
Former services
Preceding station	Milwaukee Road	Following station
Edgebrook toward Milwaukee	Chicago – Milwaukee	Mayfair toward Chicago
Edgebrook toward Walworth	Suburban Service North Line	Mayfair toward Chicago
Track layout
Location

Forest Glen is one of two Metra commuter railroad stations in the Forest Glen section of Chicago, Illinois, along the Milwaukee District North Line. It is located at 5301 North Forest Glen Avenue, is 10.2 miles (16.4 km) away from Chicago Union Station, the southern terminus of the line, and serves commuters between Union Station and Fox Lake, Illinois. In Metra's zone-based fare system, Forest Glen is in zone 2. As of 2018, Forest Glen is the 126th busiest of Metra's 236 non-downtown stations, with an average of 376 weekday boardings.

As of February 15, 2024, Forest Glen is served by 40 trains (19 inbound, 21 outbound) on weekdays, by all 20 trains (10 in each direction) on Saturdays, and by all 18 trains (nine in each direction) on Sundays and holidays.

The station is little more than an open sheltered platform, and is located south of a Cook County Forest Preserve. On-street parking is available along Forest Glen Avenue and LeClaire Avenue between Elston Avenue and north of Balmoral Avenue. The main parking lot for the station is between Balmoral and Catalpa Avenues.

== Bus connections ==
CTA Buses

- 92 Foster (one block south at LeClaire and Foster)
