= St. Mary of the Woods Catholic Church =

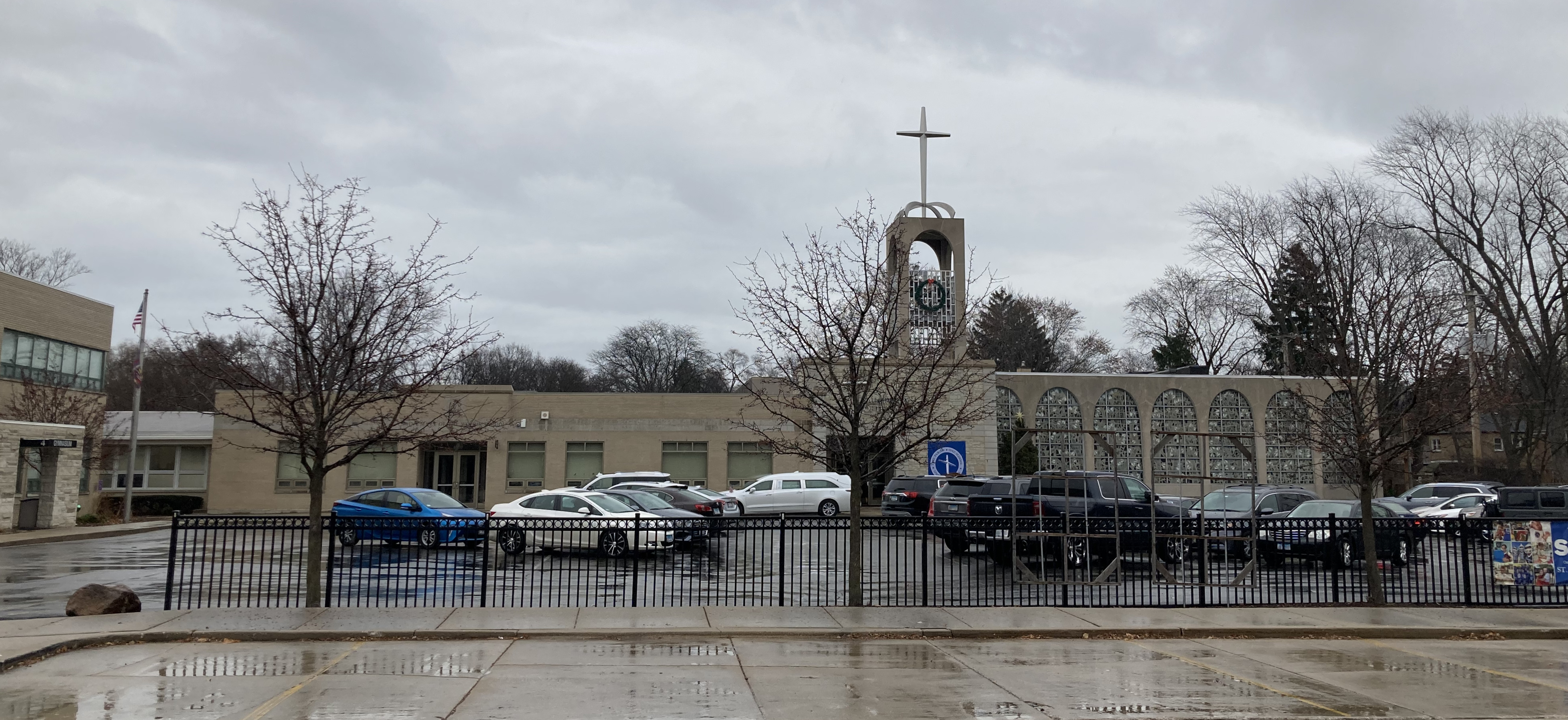
- St. Mary of the Woods Catholic Church
- 42.007863°N 87.777611°W
- Location: Chicago, Illinois
- Address: 6955 N. Hiawatha Ave.
- Country: United States
- Denomination: Roman Catholic
- Website: www.smow.org

History
- Status: Parish church
- Founded: 1952
- Founder: Monsignor Daniel .B. O'Rourke

Administration
- Archdiocese: Chicago

Clergy
- Pastor: Rich Jakubik

St. Mary of the Woods Catholic Church is a parish in the Archdiocese of Chicago located at 6955 N. Hiawatha Avenue in the North Edgebrook or Wildwood neighborhood of Chicago, Illinois known for its close-knit community. Established in 1952 when a group of Catholic women in the neighborhood began a door-to-door petitioning for a new parish in the aftermath of their children missing many school days at the far distance Queen of All Saints Basilica due to the inability of school buses to get through the snow. The petitions were submitted to Cardinal Samuel Stritch in March 1952, and by June, Father Daniel O'Rourke was appointed pastor of the, then unnamed, parish. A storefront on Touhy Avenue was the temporary location for Sunday Mass. The women of the parish's Altar & Rosary Society promptly set to work raising money at card parties, bake sales and book fairs. By February 1953, the excavation had begun on the current site of the church and school.

== Parish school ==
The St. Mary of the Woods parish school educates children in the grades from pre-school to the 8th grade. It is known for its Leader-in-me Social Emotional Learning Program, 2012 Blue Ribbon, Exceptional Football team and other athletics.

== List of St. Mary of the Woods pastors ==
- Monsignor Daniel B. O'Rourke, Founding Pastor (1952–1977)
- Father Andrew J. McDonagh (1977–1988)
- Monsignor Leo T. Mahon (1988–1997)
- Father Gregory Sakowicz (1997–2010)
- Father Patrick Cecil (2010–2016)
- Father Aiden O'Brian (2016-2020)
- Father Rich Jakubik (2020–2025)
