= Mayfair station =

Commuter rail station in Chicago, Illinois

Mayfair

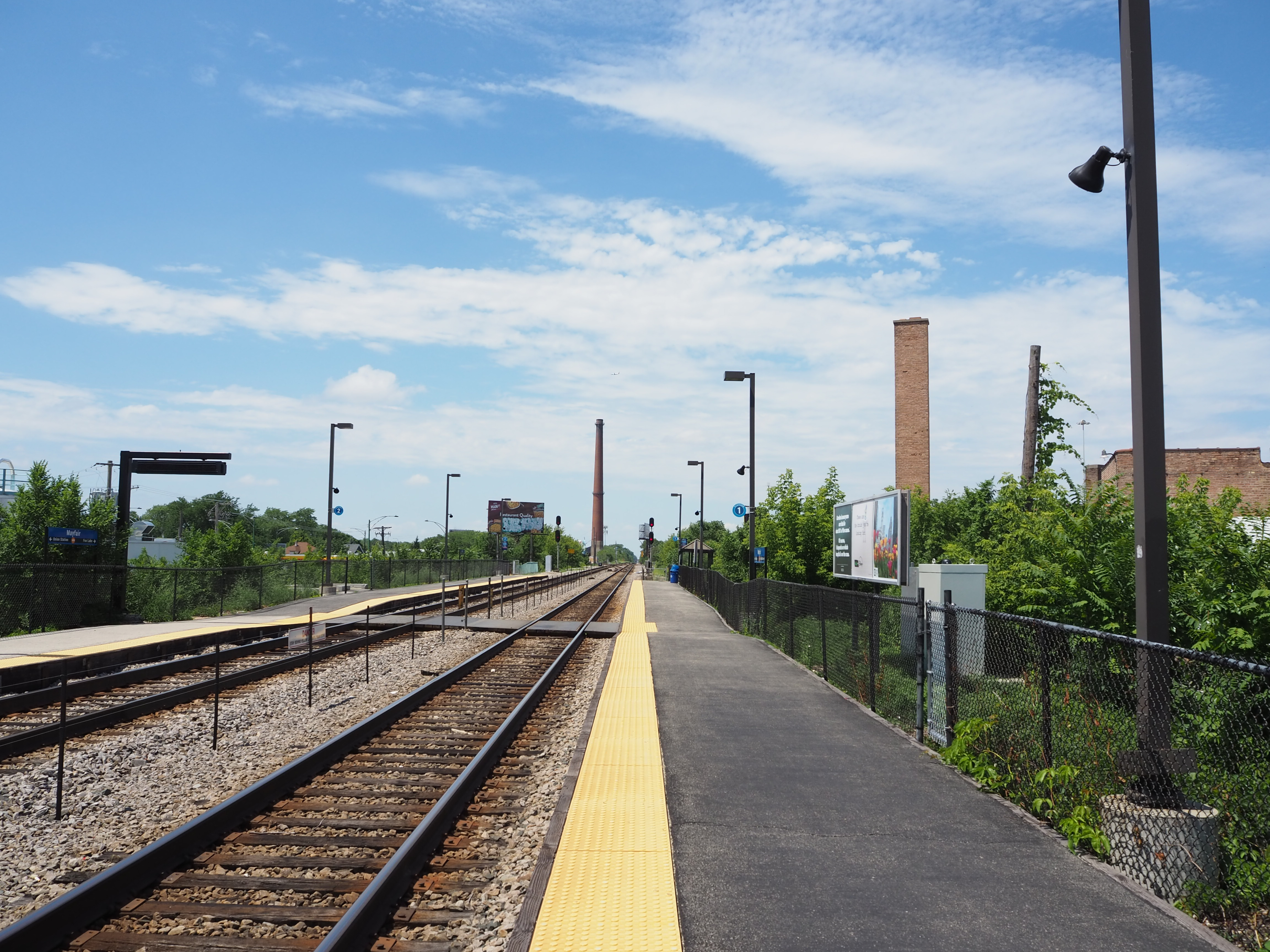
- Mayfair station in June 2024

General information
- Location: 4357 North Cicero Avenue; Chicago, Illinois 60641
- Coordinates: 41.9602°N 87.7463°W
- Line: C&M Subdivision
- Platforms: 2 side platforms
- Tracks: 2
- Connections: Blue at Montrose; CTA Buses

Construction
- Accessible: No

Other information
- Fare zone: 2

History
- Opened: 1896
- Closed: 1958 (Chicago & North Western station)

Passengers
- 2018: 281 (average weekday) ▼1.1%
- Rank: 147 out of 236

Services
Preceding station	Metra	Following station
Forest Glen toward Fox Lake	Milwaukee District North	Grayland toward Union Station
Former services
Preceding station	Milwaukee Road	Following station
Forest Glen toward Milwaukee	Chicago – Milwaukee	Grayland toward Chicago
Forest Glen toward Walworth	Suburban Service North Line	Grayland toward Chicago
Preceding station	Chicago and North Western Railway	Following station
Jefferson Park toward Crystal Lake	Wisconsin Division	Irving Park toward Chicago
Sauganash toward Skokie	Skokie Branch	Terminus
Track layout
Location

Mayfair is a Metra station located on the Milwaukee District North Line on the border between the Albany Park and Portage Park community areas of Chicago, Illinois. The station is officially located at 4357 North Cicero Avenue (Illinois Route 50), however the actual location is the northeast corner of West Pensacola and North Kilpatrick Avenues. It is 9.0 miles (14.5 km) away from Chicago Union Station, the southern terminus of the line, and serves commuters between Union Station and Fox Lake, Illinois. In Metra's zone-based fare system, Mayfair is in zone 2. As of 2018, Mayfair is the 147th busiest of Metra's 236 non-downtown stations, with an average of 281 weekday boardings.

As of February 15, 2024, Mayfair is served by 40 trains (19 inbound, 21 outbound) on weekdays, by all 20 trains (10 in each direction) on Saturdays, and by all 18 trains (nine in each direction) on Sundays and holidays.

Transfers are available to the Blue Line at the nearby Montrose Avenue station, as well as CTA's bus system. Although the line has an at-grade junction with Union Pacific Northwest Line just north of the station platforms, there are no direct connections from here to any of the UP-NW's stops within Albany Park. The Northwest Line station platforms were closed in 1958 by the then owner-operator Chicago & North Western Railway.

== Bus and rail connections ==
CTA Blue Line

- Montrose

CTA Buses

- 54 Cicero
- 54A North Cicero/Skokie Blvd (weekday rush hours only)
- 78 Montrose
