= List of neighborhoods in Chicago =

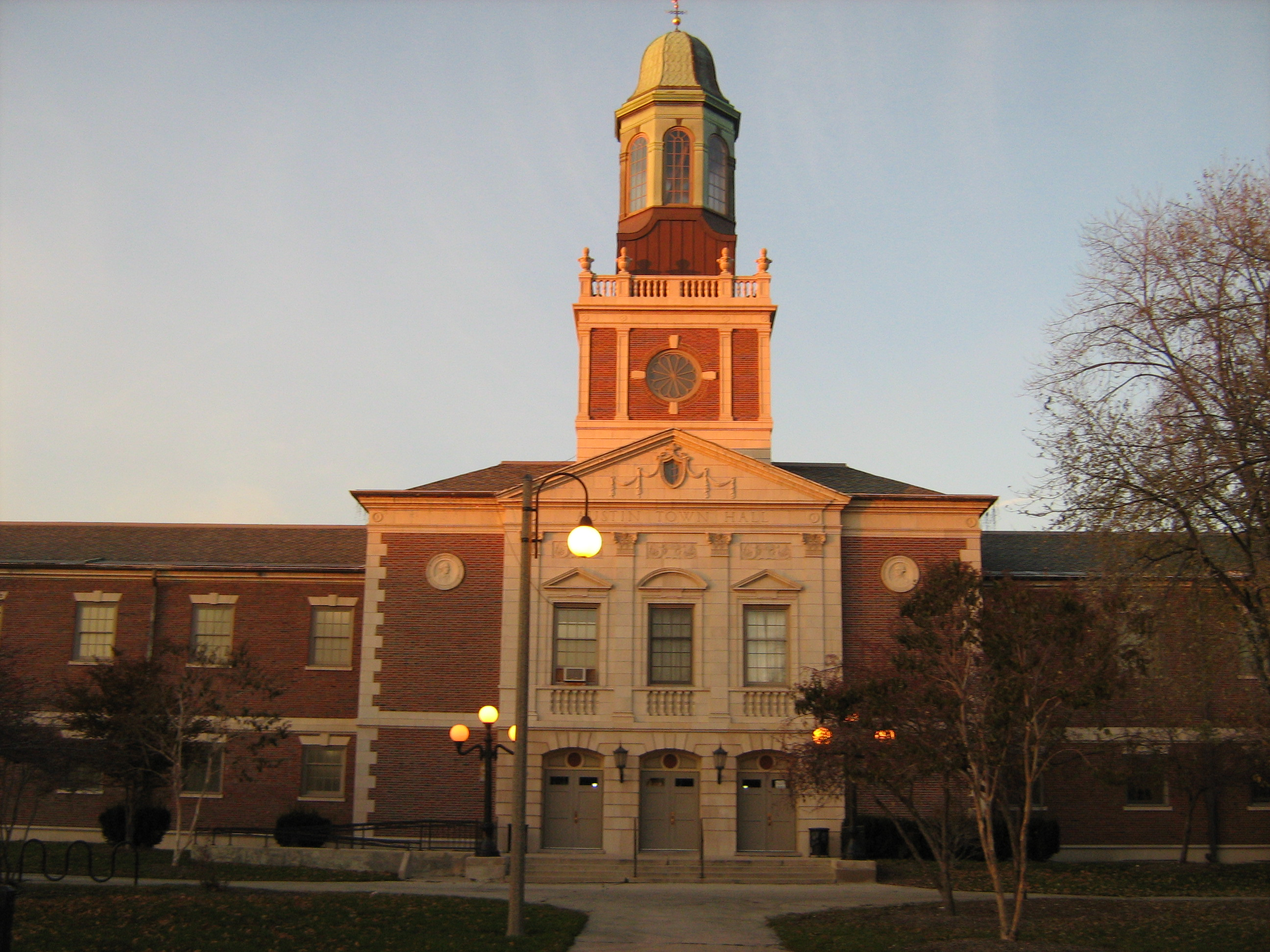
The Town Hall in Austin

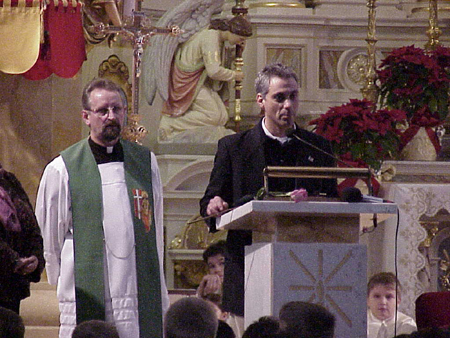
Mayor Rahm Emanuel speaking at St. Hyacinth Basilica in Avondale

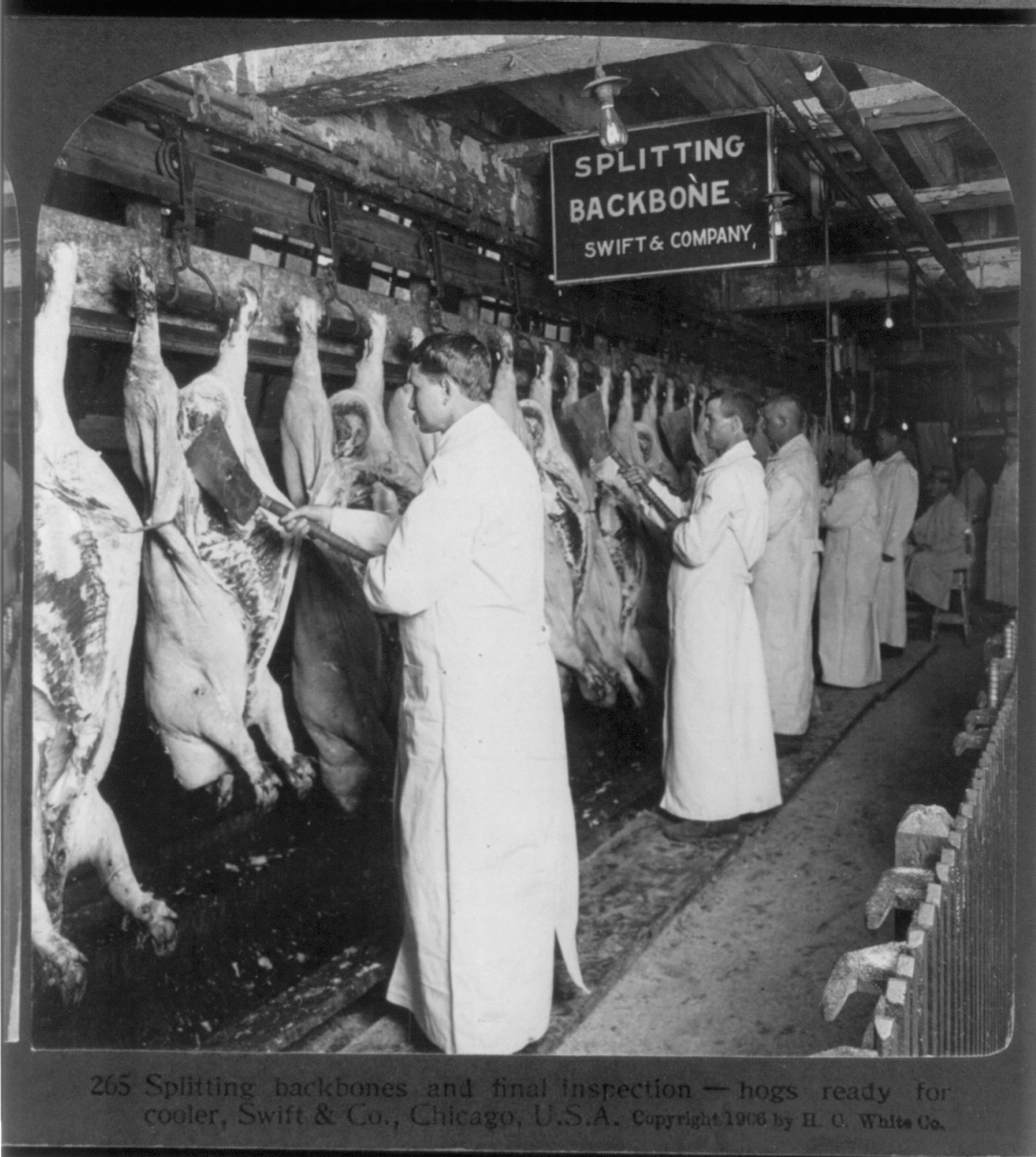
The Back of the Yards neighborhood derived from the Union Stockyards, at one time a significant employer in Chicago. Upton Sinclair's 1906 novel The Jungle revolves around the life of a Lithuanian immigrant working the Stockyards named Jurgis Rudkus.

The now-demolished plant of the White Eagle Brewing Company was in Bridgeport and designed by architect John S. Flizikowski.

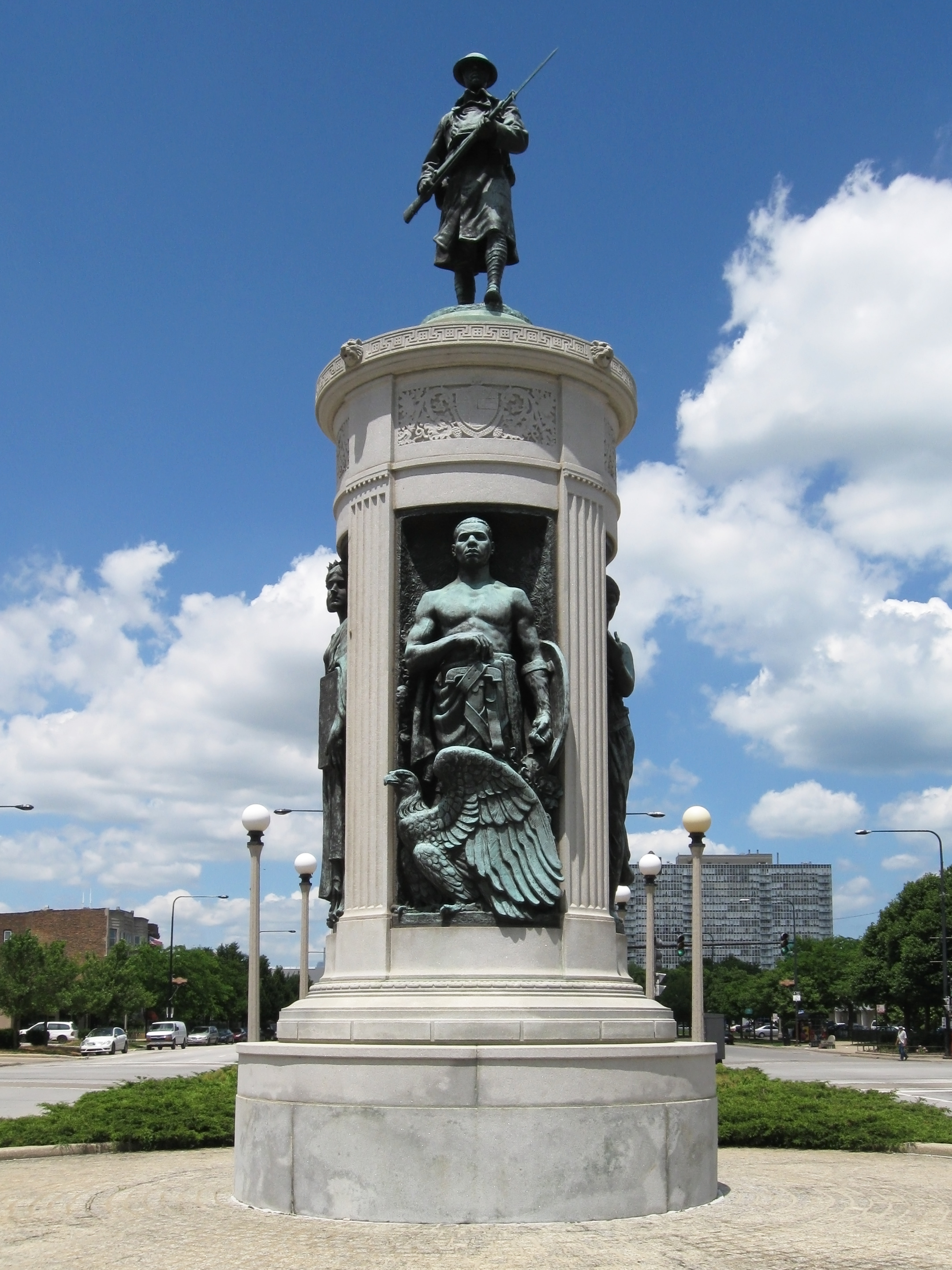
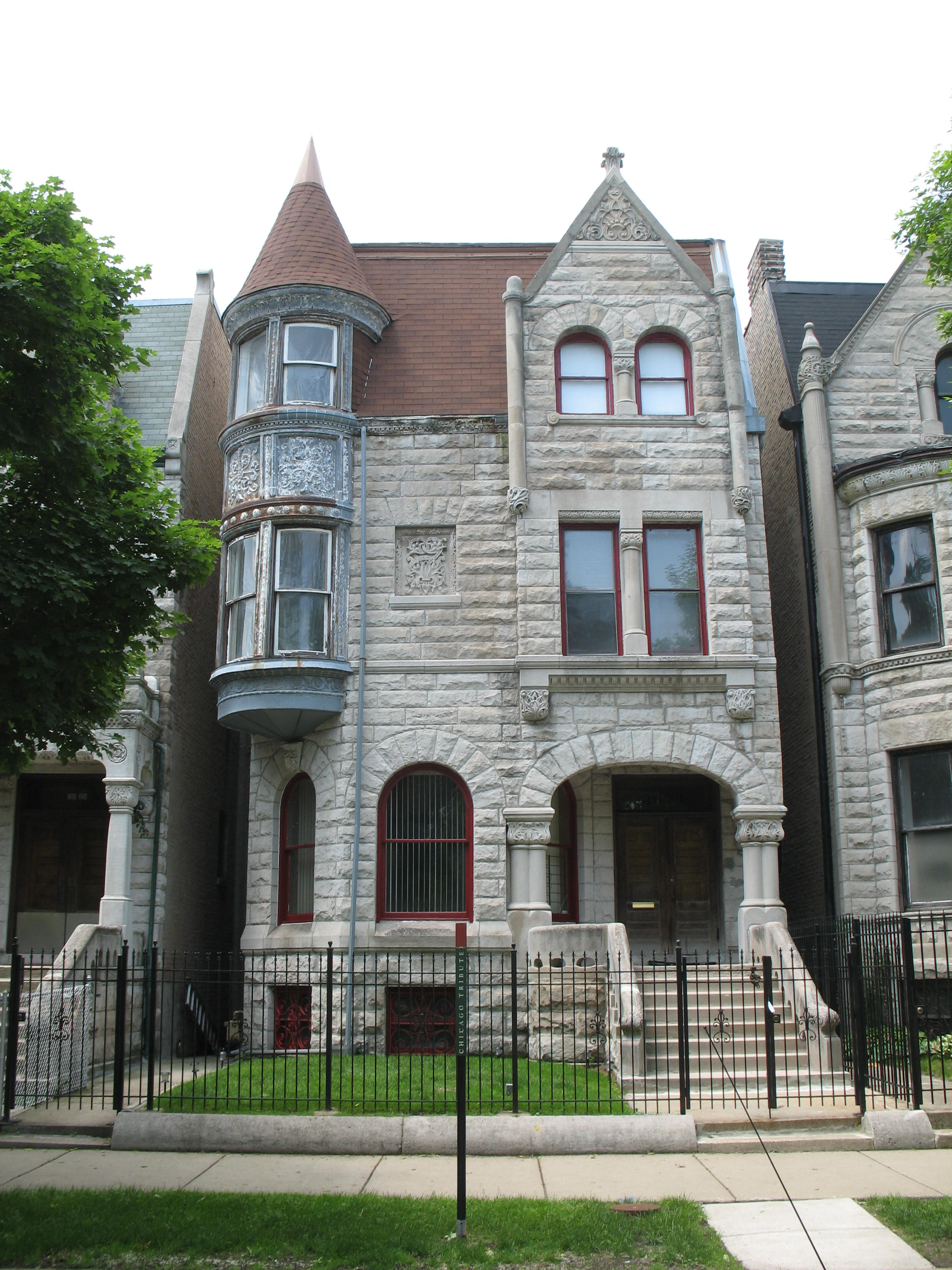
Victory Monument and Ida B. Wells-Barnett House in Bronzeville

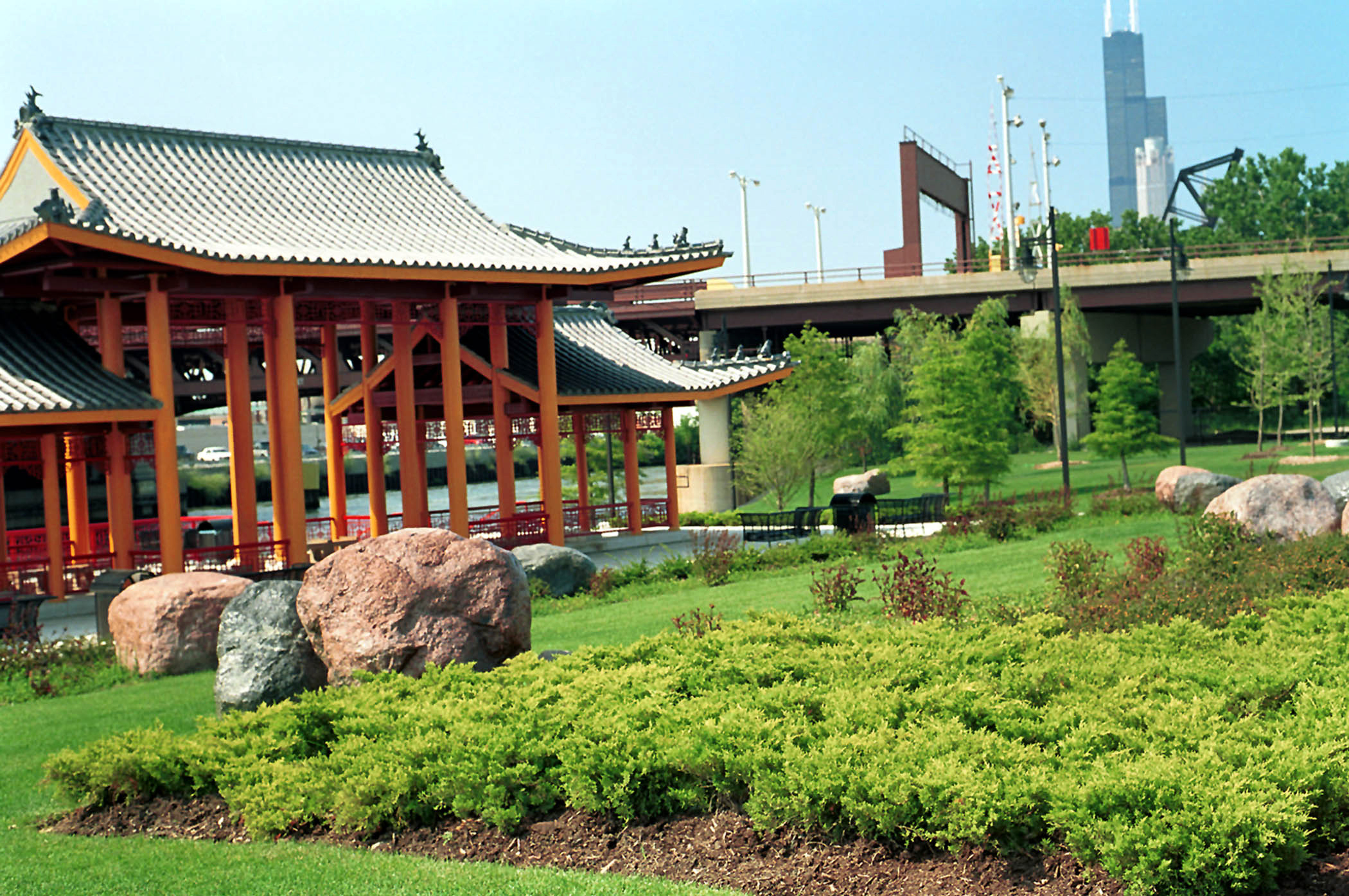
Ping Tom Memorial Park in Chicago's Chinatown

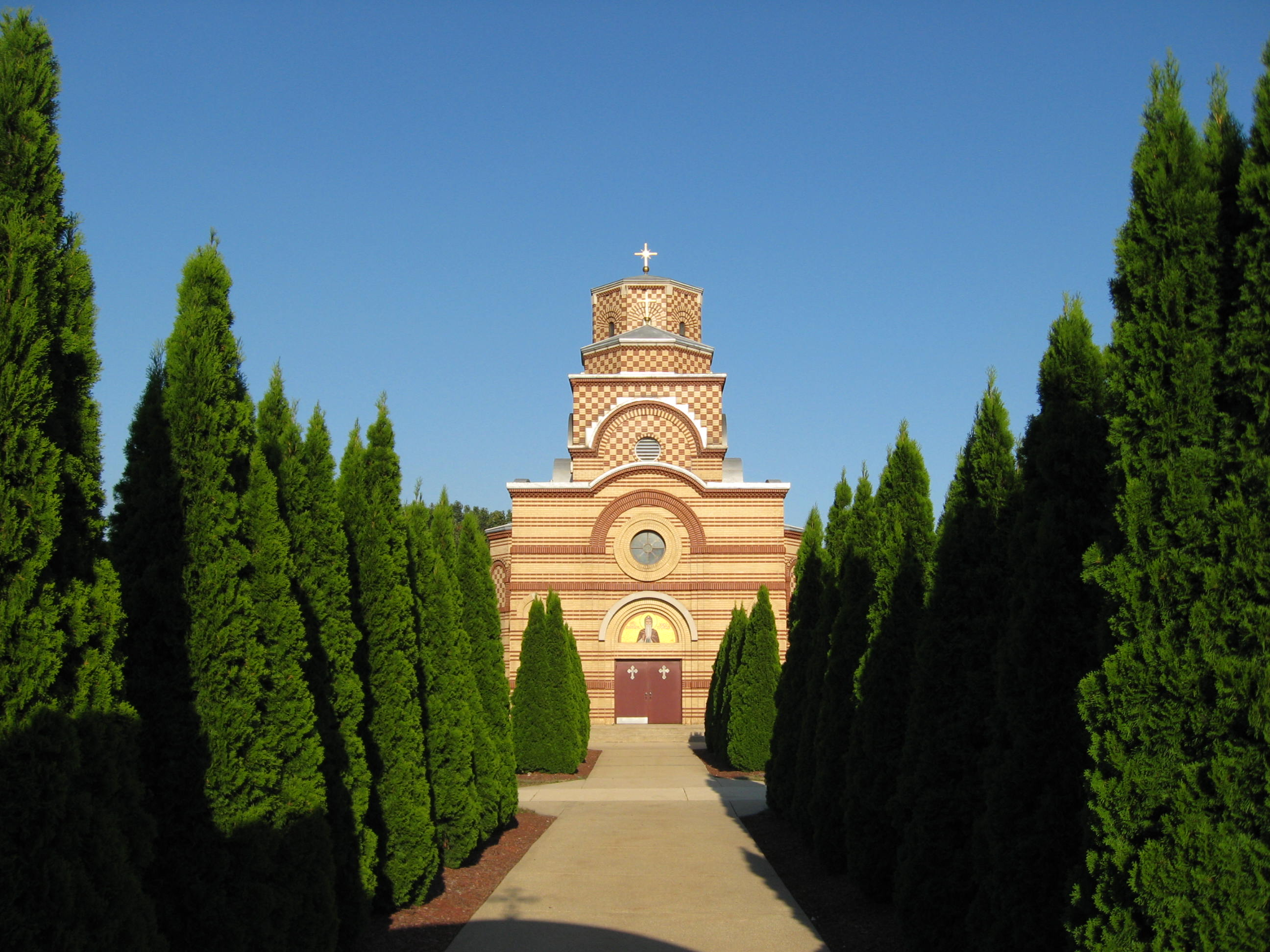
St. Simeon Mirotočivi, a Serbian Orthodox church located in East Side

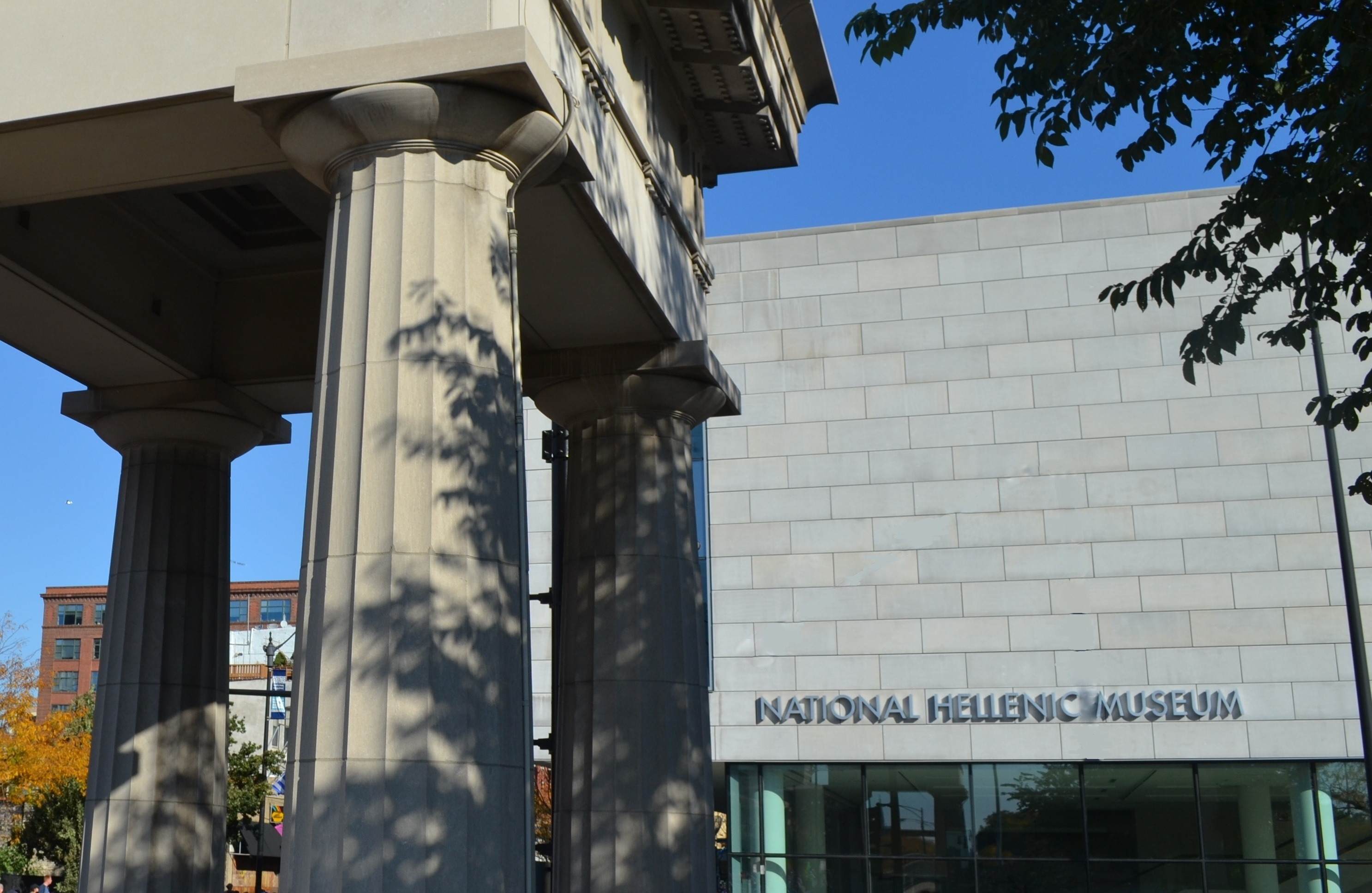
Greektown

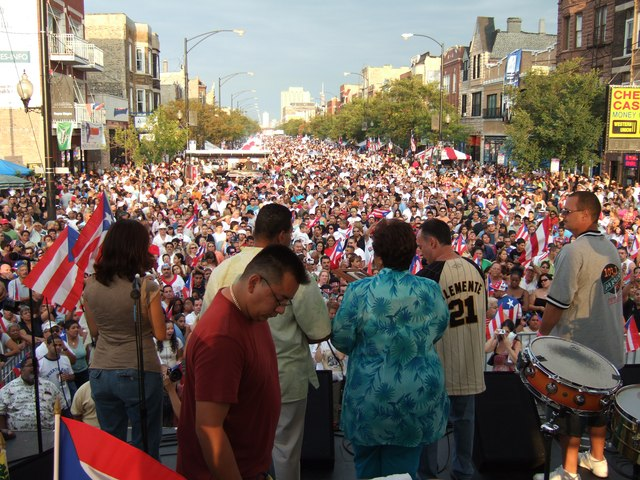
Fiesta Boricua on Paseo Boricua in Humboldt Park

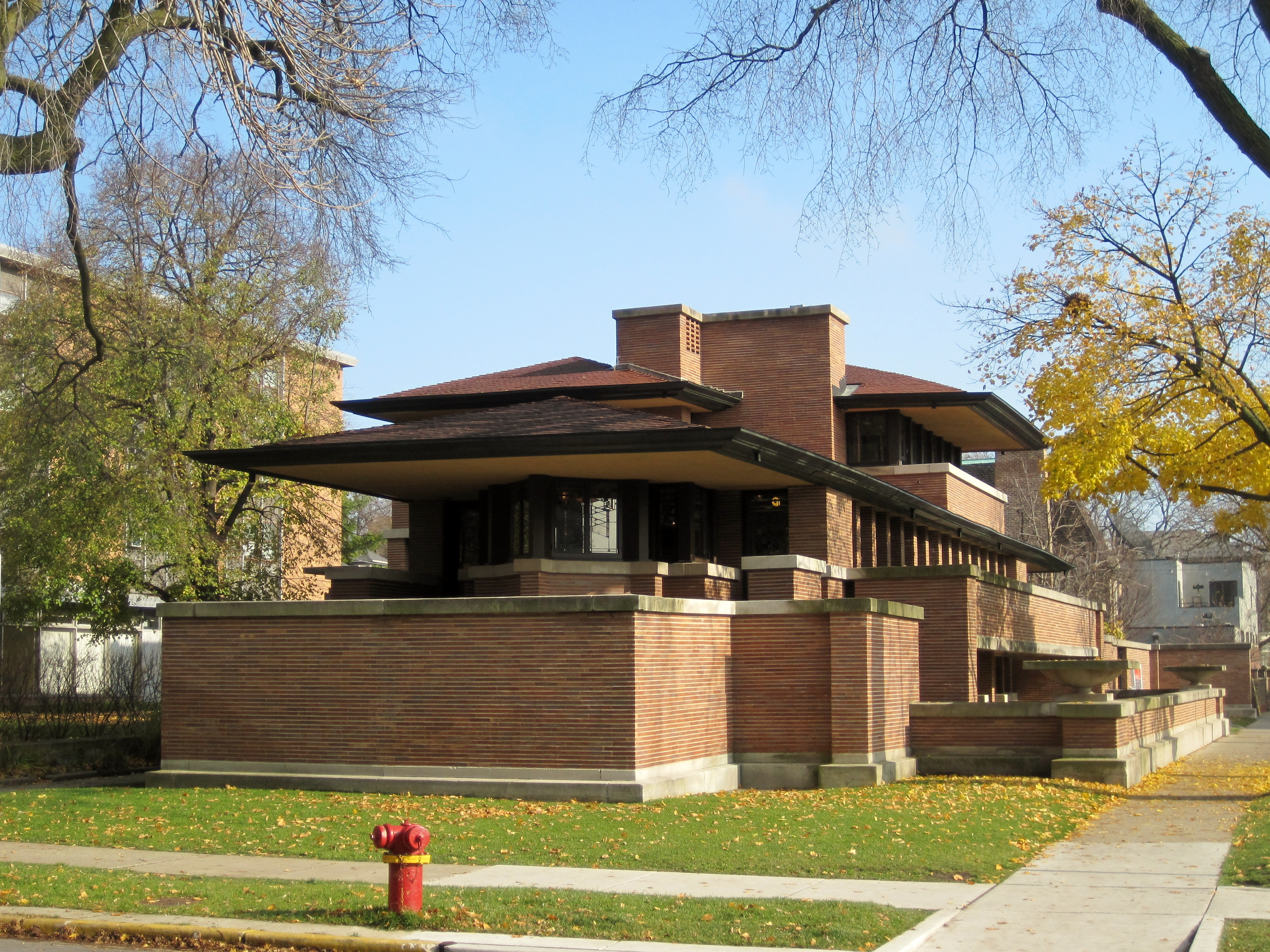
The Robie House in Hyde Park is a Frank Lloyd Wright design.

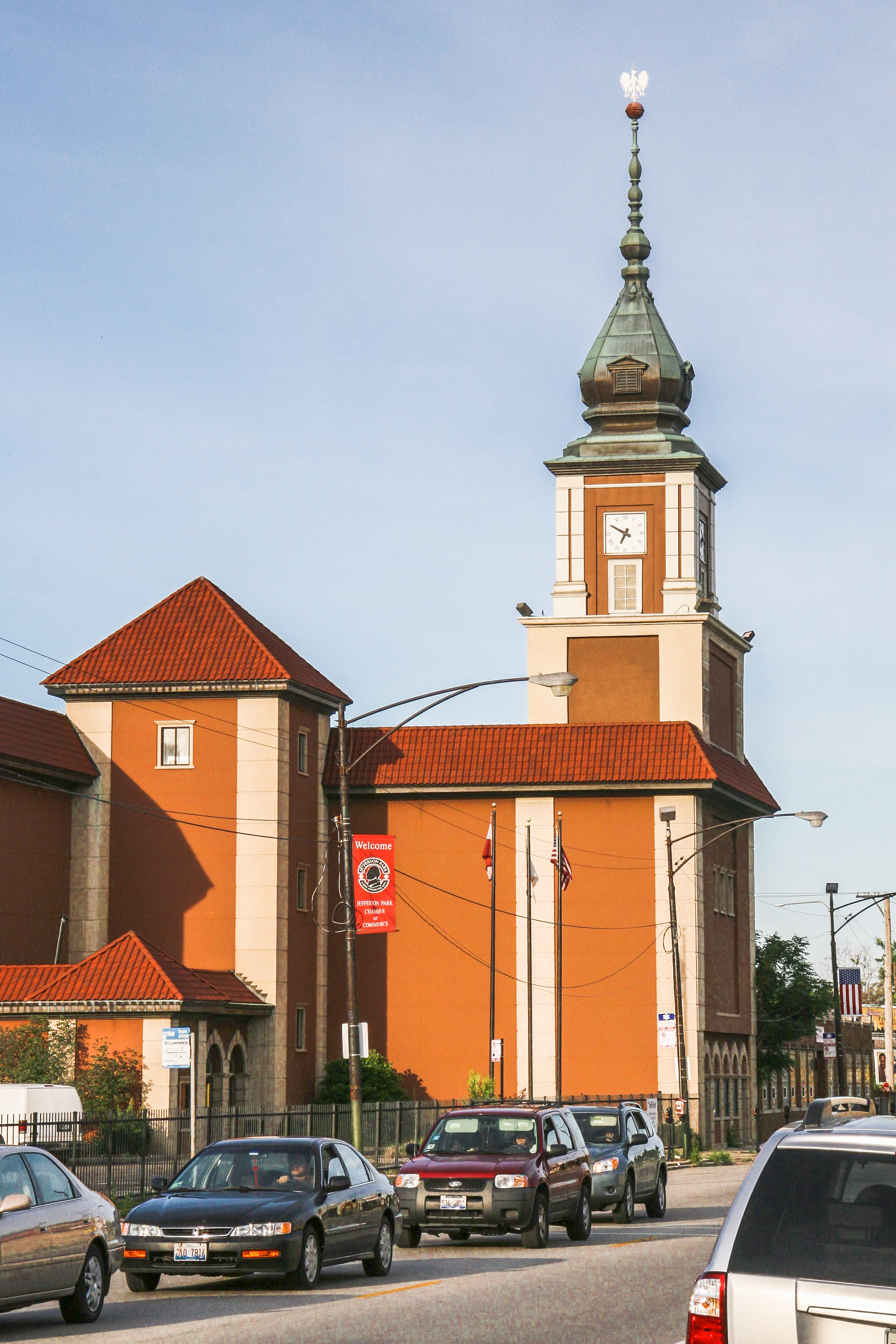
The Copernicus Theatre's Solidarity Tower in Jefferson Park is a replica of the Royal Castle in Warsaw.

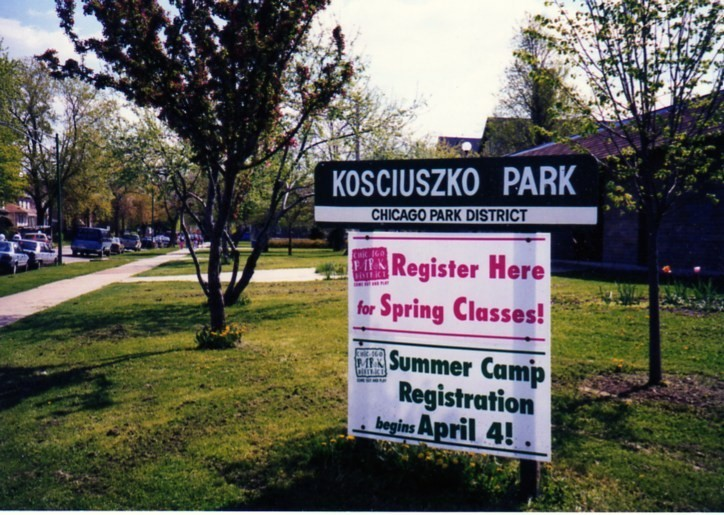
"The Land of Koz" is a nickname for the tongue-twisting proper designation of the neighborhood of Kosciuszko Park.

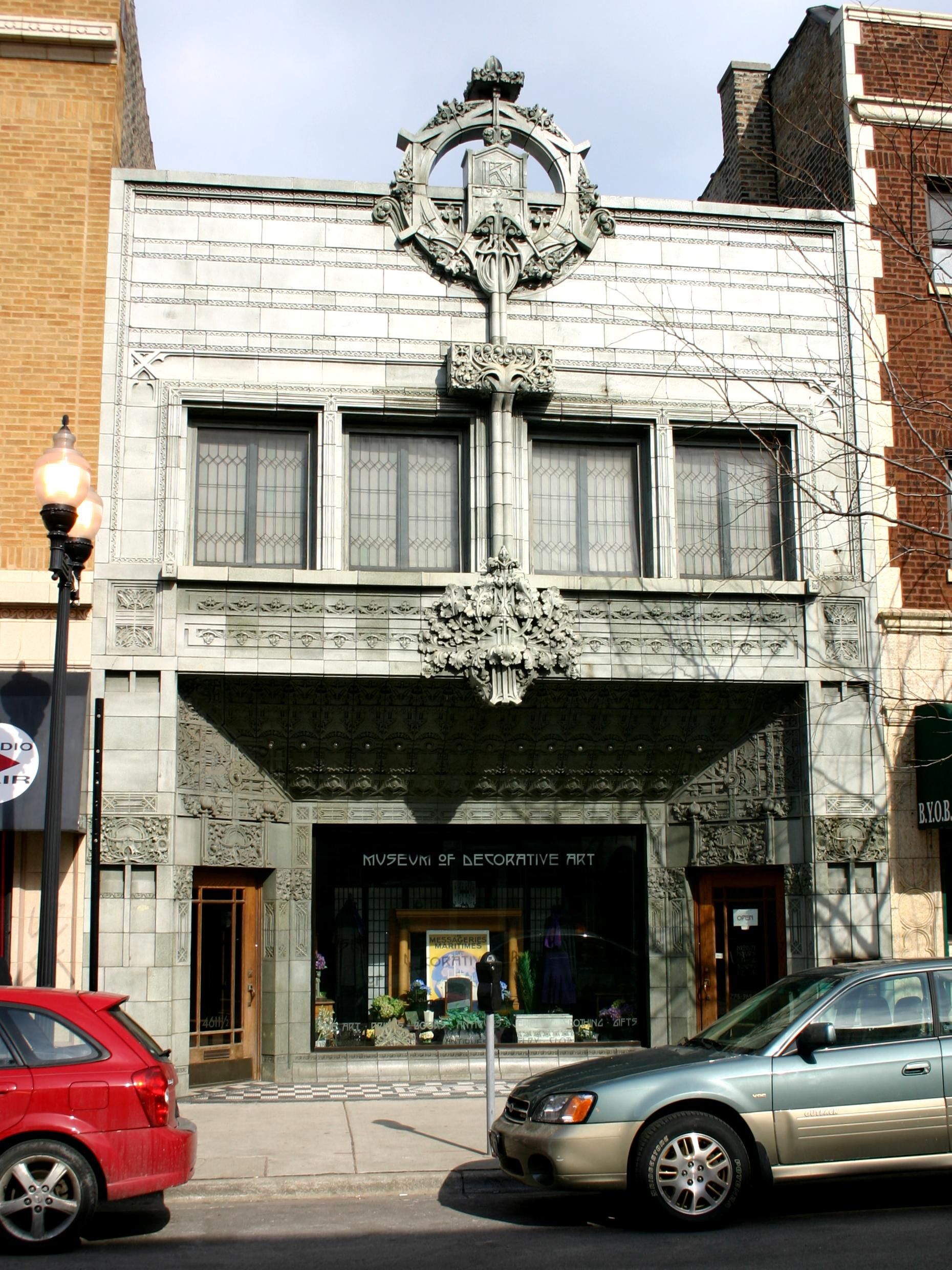
The Krause Music Store in Lincoln Square

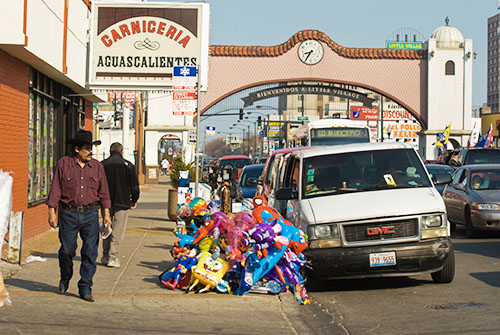
26th Street in Little Village

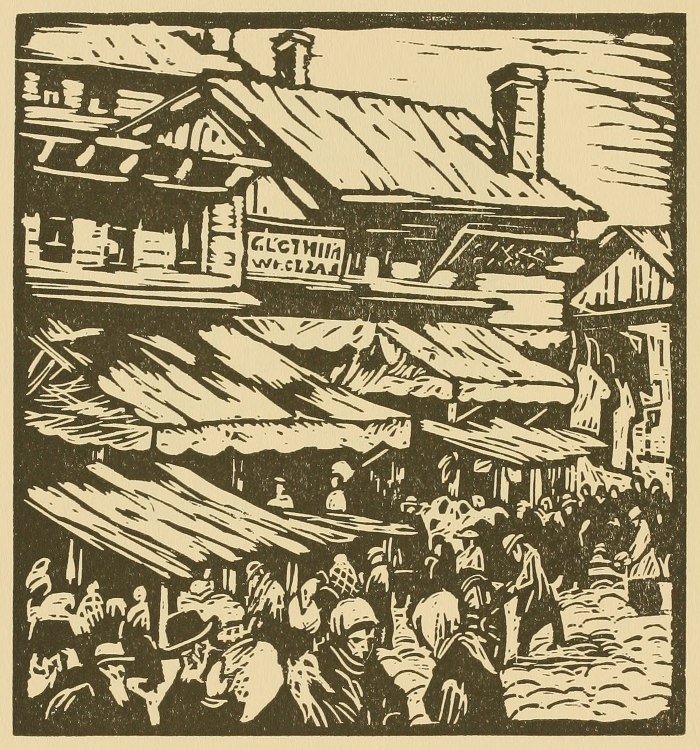
A woodblock print (1925) of Maxwell Street by Todros Geller

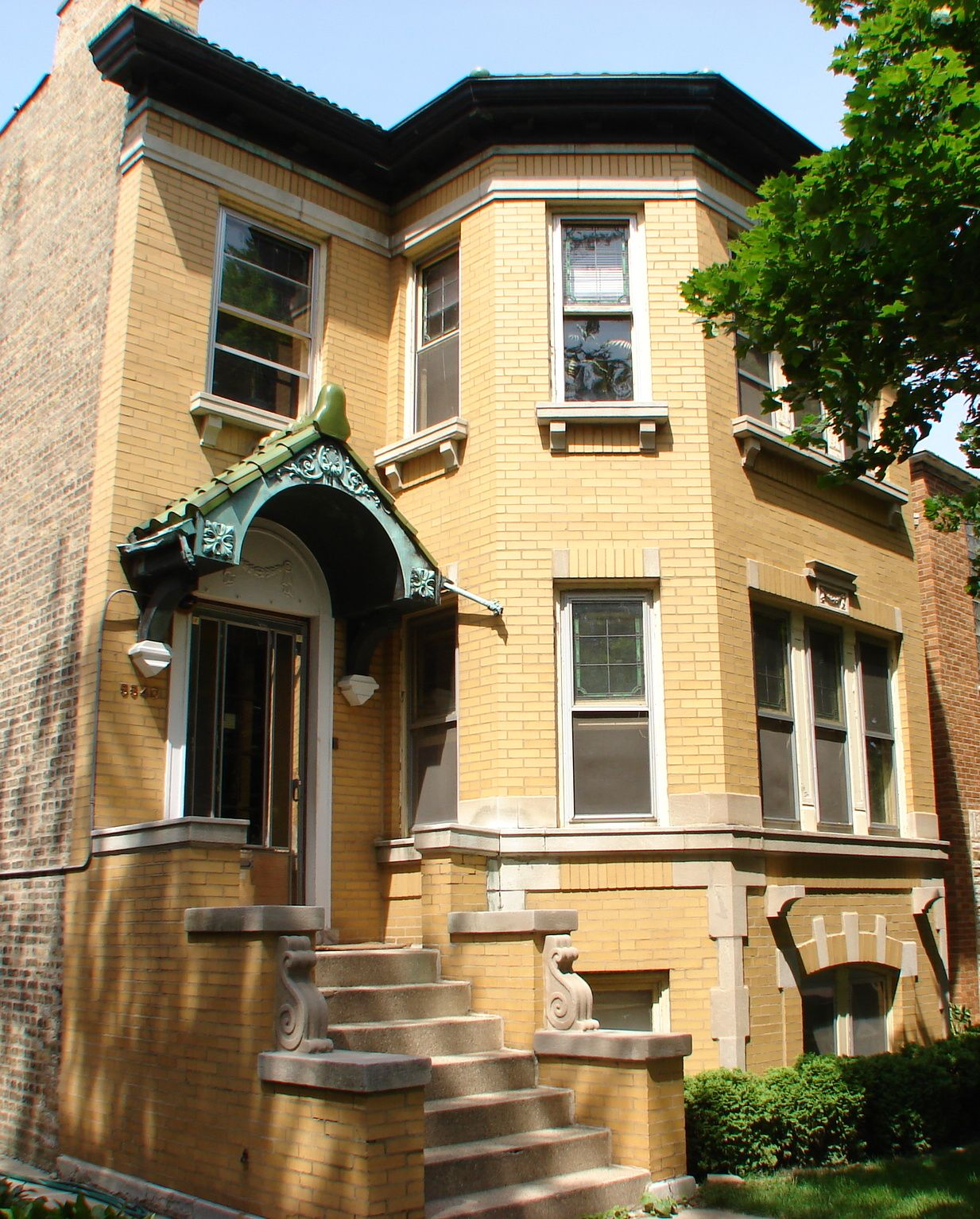
A Portage Park two-flat, or Polish flat, in Chicago's Bungalow Belt

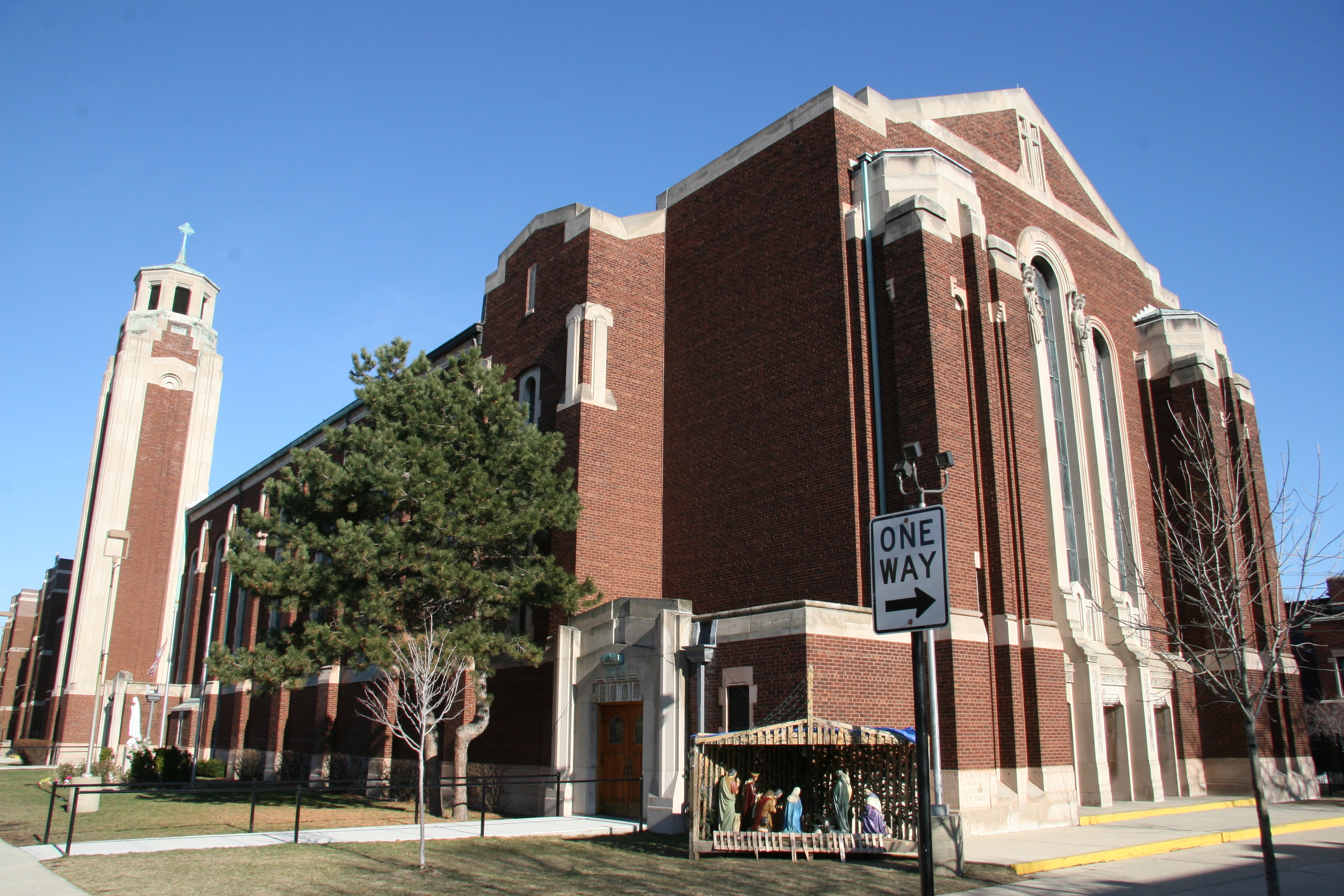
Wacławowo is derived from the Polish name for the church of St. Wenceslaus. Photographer Richard Nickel was married here in 1950.

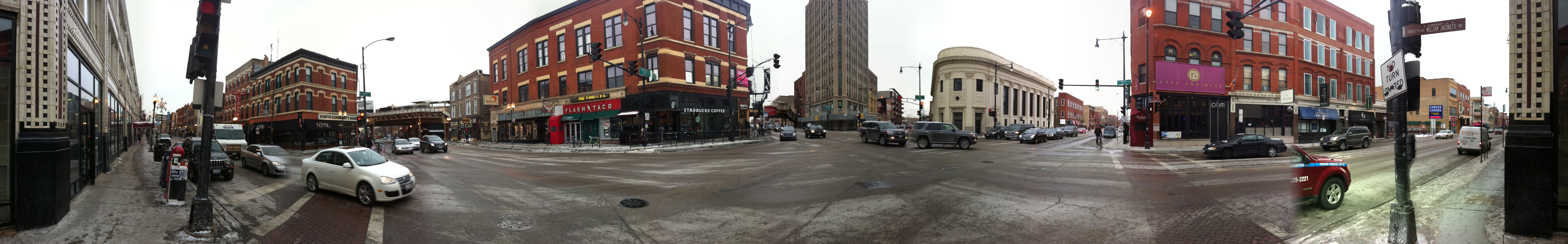
The intersections of North Ave, Damen and Milwaukee in 2010 in Wicker Park

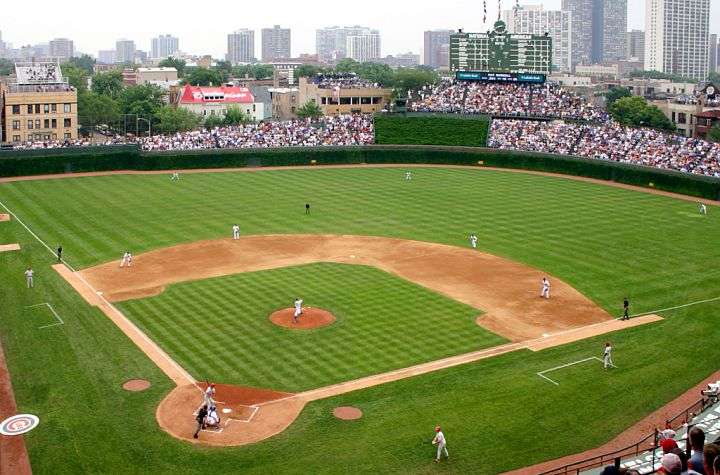
Wrigley Field, from which Wrigleyville gets its name, is home to the Chicago Cubs baseball team.

There were 178 official neighborhoods in 1993 in Chicago, although the current list includes more than 240 due to the complexities of their names and identities, evolving due to real estate development and changing culture. Chicago is also divided into 77 community areas which were drawn by University of Chicago researchers in the late 1920s to track demographics. Chicago's community areas are well-defined, generally contain multiple neighborhoods, and depending on the neighborhood, less commonly used by residents.

== List of neighborhoods by community area ==
Neighborhood	Community area
Albany Park	Albany Park
Altgeld Gardens	Riverdale
Andersonville	Edgewater
Andersonville	Uptown
Arcadia Terrace	West Ridge
Archer Heights	Archer Heights
Armour Square	Armour Square
Ashburn	Ashburn
Ashburn Estates	Ashburn
Auburn Gresham	Auburn Gresham
Avalon Park	Avalon Park
Avondale	Avondale
Avondale Gardens	Irving Park
Back of the Yards	New City
Belmont Central	Belmont Cragin
Belmont Gardens	Avondale
Belmont Gardens	Hermosa
Belmont Gardens	Logan Square
Belmont Heights	Dunning
Belmont Terrace	Dunning
Beverly	Beverly
Beverly View	Ashburn
Beverly Woods	Morgan Park
Big Oaks	Norwood Park
Northalsted "Boystown"	Lake View
Bowmanville	Lincoln Square
Brainerd	Washington Heights
Brickyard	Belmont Cragin
Bridgeport	Bridgeport
Brighton Park	Brighton Park
Bronzeville	Douglas
Bucktown	Logan Square
Budlong Woods	Lincoln Square
Buena Park	Uptown
Burnside	Burnside
Cabrini–Green	Near North Side
Calumet Heights	Calumet Heights
Canaryville	New City
Central Station	Near South Side
Chatham	Chatham
Chicago Lawn	Chicago Lawn
Chinatown	Armour Square
Chrysler Village	Clearing
Clarendon Park	Uptown
Clearing East	Clearing
Clearing West	Clearing
Cottage Grove Heights	Pullman
Cragin	Belmont Cragin
Crestline	Ashburn
Dearborn Homes	Douglas
Dearborn Park	The Loop
Dearborn Park	Near South Side
Douglas Park	North Lawndale
Dunning	Dunning
East Beverly	Beverly
East Chatham	Chatham
East Garfield Park	East Garfield Park
East Hyde Park	Hyde Park
East Pilsen	Lower West Side
East Side	East Side
East Village	West Town
Eden Green	Riverdale
Edgebrook	Forest Glen
Edgewater	Edgewater
Edgewater Beach	Edgewater
Edgewater Glen	Edgewater
Edison Park	Edison Park
Englewood	Englewood
Fernwood	Roseland
Fifth City	East Garfield Park
Ford City	West Lawn
Forest Glen	Forest Glen
Fuller Park	Fuller Park
Fulton River District	Near West Side
Gage Park	Gage Park
Galewood	Austin
The Gap	Douglas
Garfield Ridge	Garfield Ridge
Gladstone Park	Jefferson Park
Gold Coast	Near North Side
Golden Gate	Riverdale
Goose Island	Near North Side
Graceland West	Lake View
Grand Boulevard	Grand Boulevard
Grand Crossing	Greater Grand Crossing
Greater Grand Crossing	Greater Grand Crossing
Greektown	Near West Side
Gresham	Auburn Gresham
Groveland Park	Douglas
Hamilton Park	Englewood
Hanson Park	Belmont Cragin
Heart of Chicago	Lower West Side
Hegewisch	Hegewisch
Hermosa	Hermosa
Hollywood Park	North Park
Homan Square	North Lawndale
Humboldt Park	Humboldt Park
Hyde Park	Hyde Park
Illinois Medical District	Near West Side
Irving Park	Irving Park
Irving Woods	Dunning
The Island	Austin
Jackowo	Avondale
Jackson Park Highlands	South Shore
Jefferson Park	Jefferson Park
K-Town	North Lawndale
Kelvyn Park	Hermosa
Kennedy Park	Morgan Park
Kensington	Roseland
Kenwood	Kenwood
Kilbourn Park	Irving Park
Kosciuszko Park	Logan Square
Lake Meadows	Douglas
Lake View	Lake View
Lakeview (East)	Lake View
Lakewood / Balmoral	Edgewater
LeClaire Courts	Garfield Ridge
Legends South (Robert Taylor Homes)	Grand Boulevard
Lilydale	Roseland
Lincoln Park	Lincoln Park
Lincoln Square	Lincoln Square
Lithuanian Plaza	Chicago Lawn
Little Italy	Near West Side
Little Village	South Lawndale
Logan Square	Logan Square
Longwood Manor	Washington Heights
The Loop	The Loop
Lower West Side	Lower West Side
Loyola	Rogers Park
Magnificent Mile	Near North Side
Margate Park	Uptown
Marquette Park	Chicago Lawn
Marshall Square	South Lawndale
Marynook	Avalon Park
Mayfair	Albany Park
McKinley Park	McKinley Park
Merchant Park	Irving Park
Montclare	Montclare
Morgan Park	Morgan Park
Mount Greenwood	Mount Greenwood
Museum Campus	Near South Side
New Eastside	The Loop
Near North Side	Near North Side
Near West Side	Near West Side
New Chinatown	Uptown
New City	New City
Noble Square	West Town
North Austin	Austin
North Center	North Center
North Kenwood	Kenwood
North Lawndale	North Lawndale
North Mayfair	Albany Park
North Park	North Park
Nortown	West Ridge
Norwood Park East	Norwood Park
Norwood Park West	Norwood Park
Oakland	Oakland
O'Hare	O'Hare
Old Edgebrook	Forest Glen
Old Irving Park (Grayland)	Irving Park
Old Norwood	Norwood Park
Old Town	Near North Side
Old Town Triangle	Lincoln Park
Oriole Park	Norwood Park
Palmer Square	Logan Square
Park Manor	Greater Grand Crossing
Park West	Lincoln Park
Parkview	Ashburn
Peterson Park	West Ridge
Pill Hill	Calumet Heights
Pilsen	Lower West Side
Polish Downtown	Logan Square
Polish Downtown	West Town
Polish Village	Avondale
Polish Village	Irving Park
Portage Park	Portage Park
Prairie Avenue Historic District	Near South Side
Prairie Shores	Douglas
Princeton Park	Roseland
Printer's Row	The Loop
Pulaski Park	West Town
Pullman	Pullman
Ranch Triangle	Lincoln Park
Ravenswood	Lincoln Square
Ravenswood Gardens	Lincoln Square
Ravenswood Manor	Albany Park
River North	Near North Side
River West	West Town
River's Edge	North Park
Riverdale	Riverdale
Rogers Park	Rogers Park
Roscoe Village	North Center
Rosehill	West Ridge
Roseland	Roseland
Rosemoor	Roseland
St. Ben's	North Center
Sauganash	Forest Glen
Schorsch Forest View	O'Hare
Schorsch Village	Dunning
Scottsdale	Ashburn
Sheffield Neighbors	Lincoln Park
Sheridan Park	Uptown
Sheridan Station Corridor	Lakeview
Sleepy Hollow	Garfield Ridge
Smith Park	West Town
South Austin	Austin
South Chicago	South Chicago
South Commons	Douglas
South Deering	South Deering
South East Ravenswood	Lake View
South Edgebrook	Forest Glen
South Lawndale	South Lawndale
South Loop	The Loop
South Shore	South Shore
Stateway Gardens	Douglas
Stony Island Park	Avalon Park
Streeterville	Near North Side
Talley's Corner	Mount Greenwood
Tri-Taylor	Near West Side
Ukrainian Village	West Town
Union Ridge	Norwood Park
University Village	Near West Side
Uptown	Uptown
The Villa	Irving Park
Vittum Park	Garfield Ridge
Wacławowo	Avondale
Washington Heights	Washington Heights
Washington Park	Washington Park
Wentworth Gardens	Armour Square
West Beverly	Beverly
West Chatham	Chatham
West Chesterfield	Chatham
West Chesterfield	Roseland
West DePaul	Lincoln Park
West Elsdon	West Elsdon
West Englewood	West Englewood
West Garfield Park	West Garfield Park
West Humboldt Park	Austin
West Humboldt Park	Humboldt Park
Lakeview (West)	Lake View
West Lawn	West Lawn
West Loop	Near West Side
West Morgan Park	Morgan Park
West Pullman	West Pullman
West Ridge	West Ridge
West Rogers Park	West Ridge
West Town	West Town
West Woodlawn	Woodlawn
Wicker Park	West Town
Wildwood	Forest Glen
Woodlawn	Woodlawn
Wrightwood	Ashburn
Wrightwood Neighbors	Lincoln Park
Wrigleyville	Lake View

== See also ==
- Community areas in Chicago
