= Queen of All Saints Basilica =

Coordinates: 41.9952°N 87.7448°W

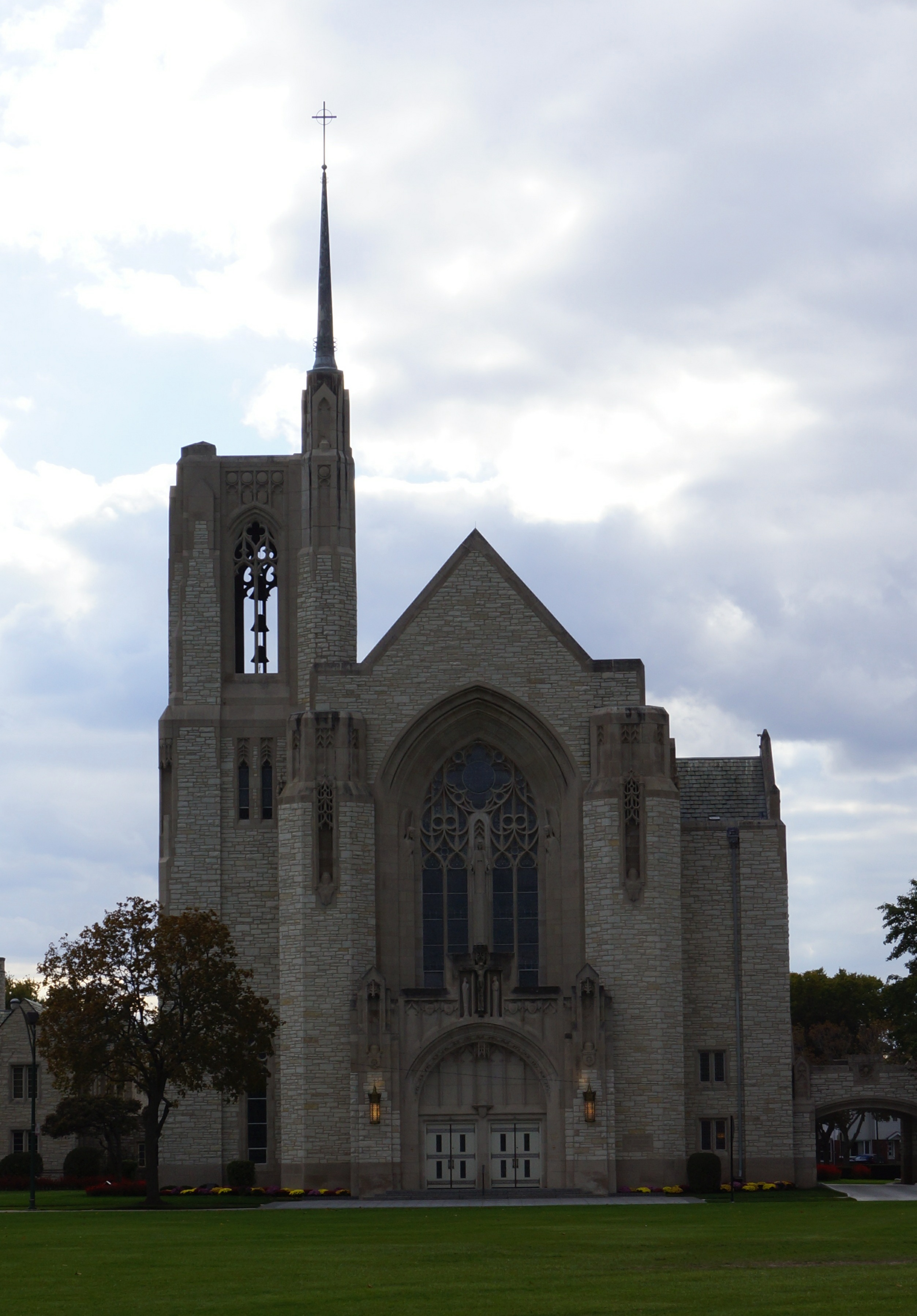

- Location: Chicago
- Country: USA
- Denomination: Catholic
- Website: Queen of All Saints Basilica

History
- Founded: 1929
- Dedication: Mary, Queen of Heaven
- Dedicated: June 1, 1929
- Consecrated: 1960

Architecture
- Functional status: Active
- Architectural type: Basilica
- Style: Gothic Revival
- Groundbreaking: 1956
- Completed: 1960

Specifications
- Length: 240 ft (73 m)
- Width: 80 ft (24 m)
- Height: 80 ft (24 m)
- Materials: Wisconsin Lannon stone, Indiana Limestone, Vermont slate

Administration
- Archdiocese: Chicago

Clergy
- Pastor: Rev. Simon Braganza

Queen of All Saints Basilica is a historic church of the Roman Catholic Archdiocese of Chicago located at 6280 North Sauganash Avenue in Chicago's upper middle-class Sauganash neighborhood. Along with St. Hyacinth and Our Lady of Sorrows it is one of three minor basilicas in Chicago, Illinois.

== History ==
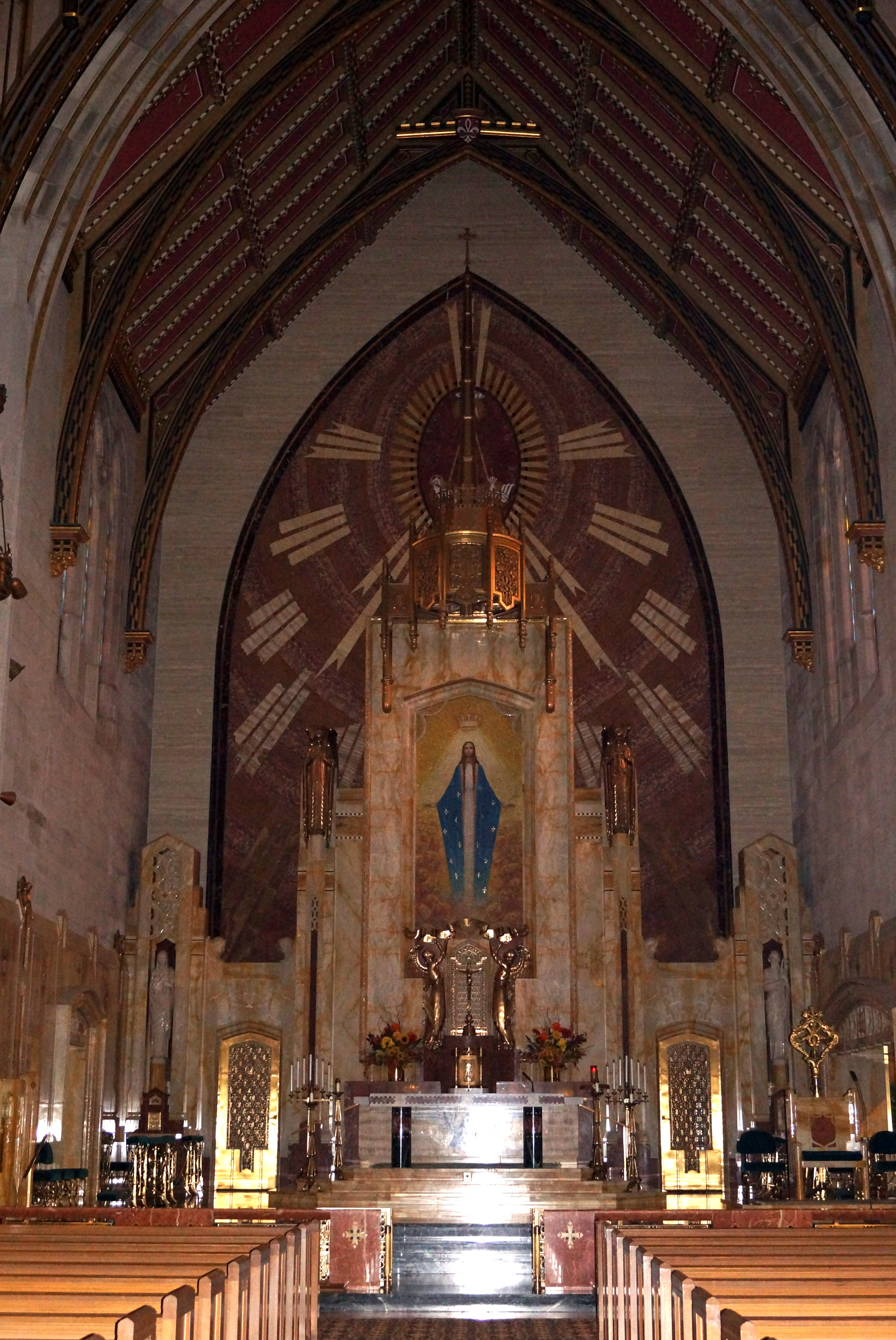
The Nave and Sanctuary

In 1929 the Calvert Club, a Catholic area fraternal organization, pushed to establish a church in the Sauganash area. Its members petitioned the Archbishop of Chicago, Cardinal George Mundelein, who granted the request and appointed Father Francis A. Ryan to be pastor of the new parish dedicated to Queen of All Saints. The initial church structure was a portable wood-frame church that had previously served as St. Giles Church in nearby Oak Park. It was relocated to the northwest corner of Peterson and Knox Avenues and dedicated in June 1929 as Queen of All Saints Church. The area filled with residential developments after World War II, and first attracted Irish and German immigrants and their descendants. The Queen of All Saints School was founded in 1932 and like the church, has an enrollment largely of Irish and Germanic descent. On March 26, 1962, Pope John XXIII elevated the church to the dignity of a basilica.

== Architecture ==
The church, designed in a Neo-Gothic style by Meyer and Cook, was completed in 1960. The large window over the choir loft features eight different shrines of the Virgin Mary: Our Lady of Czestochowa, Our Lady of Knock, Our Lady of Einsiedeln, Our Lady of the Snows, Our Lady of La Salette, Our Lady of Guadalupe, Our Lady of Lourdes and Our Lady of Fatima. This display alludes to the theme of the universality of the Catholic Church by highlighting that although these shrines are particular to a certain country or culture, the Cult of the Virgin Mary bridges over all these barriers, bringing together the different ethnic groups living in Sauganash area of Forest Glen. The original circa 1930s organ was replaced in 2006 due to its poor condition from age and an act of vandalism in the 1970s. The new instrument is a three-manual, 60-rank opus by Berghaus Pipe Organ Builders of Bellwood, Illinois.

== List of Queen of All Saints Basilica Pastors ==
- Father Francis "Packy" Ryan (1929-1934)
- Monsignor Francis J. Dolan (1934-1969)
- Father Patrick C. Hunter (1969-1978)
- Father Robert Clark (1978-1991)
- Father Charles Cronin (1991-1996)
- Monsignor Wayne F. Prist (1996-2010)
- Monsignor John E. Pollard (2010-2018)
- Father Simon Braganza (2018–present)

== Queen of All Saints Basilica in architecture books ==
Queen of All Saints Basilica is featured in a number of books on church architecture, among them:

- Chicago Churches: A Photographic Essay by Elizabeth Johnson (Uppercase Books Inc, 1999)
- Heavenly City: The Architectural Tradition of Catholic Chicago by Denis R. McNamara (Liturgy Training Publications)
- Chicago Churches and Synagogues: An Architectural Pilgrimage by George A. Lane (Loyola Press 1982), 2005)
- The Archdiocese of Chicago: A Journey of Faith by Edward R. Kantowicz (Booklink 2007)
- Chicago Catholic Churches: A Sketchbook by Harrison Fillmore (Arcadia Publishing 2022)

== See also ==
- Roman Catholic Marian churches
