= Edgebrook station =

Commuter rail station in Chicago, Illinois

Edgebrook

General information
- Location: 5438 West Devon Avenue; Edgebrook, Chicago, Illinois 60646
- Coordinates: 41.9979°N 87.7657°W
- Line: C&M Subdivision
- Platforms: 2 side platforms
- Tracks: 2
- Connections: CTA & Pace Buses

Construction
- Structure type: One shelter, one covered platform
- Parking: Yes
- Accessible: Yes

Other information
- Fare zone: 2

Passengers
- 2018: 701 (average weekday) ▲15.1%
- Rank: 74 out of 236

Services
| Preceding station | Metra | Following station |
|---|---|---|
| Morton Grove toward Fox Lake | Milwaukee District North | Forest Glen toward Union Station |
Former services
| Preceding station | Milwaukee Road | Following station |
|---|---|---|
| Morton Grove toward Milwaukee | Chicago – Milwaukee | Forest Glen toward Chicago |
| Morton Grove toward Walworth | Suburban Service North Line | Forest Glen toward Chicago |
Track layout
Location

Edgebrook is a commuter railroad station on Metra's Milwaukee District North Line in the Edgebrook neighborhood of the Forest Glen section of Chicago, Illinois. The station is 11.5 miles (18.5 km) away from Chicago Union Station, the southern terminus of the line, and serves commuters between Union Station and Fox Lake, Illinois. In Metra's zone-based fare system, Edgebrook is in zone 2. As of 2018, Edgebrook is the 74th busiest of Metra's 236 non-downtown stations, with an average of 701 weekday boardings. This is the last station outbound in Chicago city limits.

As of February 15, 2024, Edgebrook is served by 41 trains (20 inbound, 21 outbound) on weekdays, by all 20 trains (10 in each direction) on Saturdays, and by all 18 trains (nine in each direction) on Sundays and holidays.

== Bus connections ==
CTA

- 84 Peterson
- 85A North Central (Monday–Saturday only)

Pace

- 225 Central/Howard (weekday rush hours only)
- 226 Oakton Street (weekdays only)
