= Robbins Park Historic District =

Historic district in Illinois, United States

- U.S. National Register of Historic Places
- U.S. Historic district
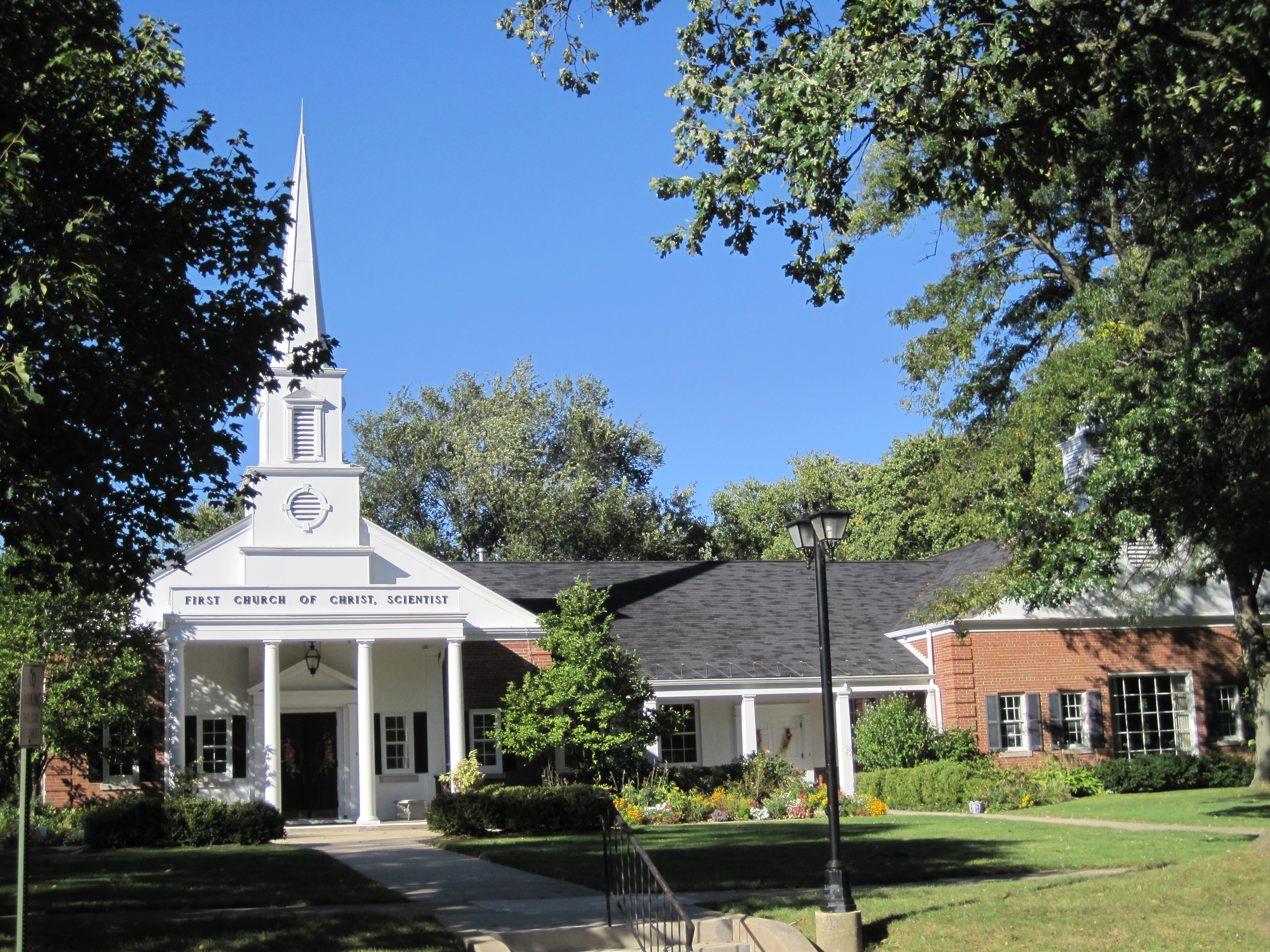
- The First Church of Christ, Scientist, designed by Solon Spencer Beman

- Location within Illinois Location within the United States
- Location: Bounded by Chicago Av, 8th St, County Line Rd, Garfield St; Hinsdale, DuPage County, Illinois, U.S.
- Coordinates: 41°53′14″N 87°55′18″W
- Architectural style: Late Victorian, Italianate, Queen Anne, Late 19th and 20th Century Revivals, Colonial Revival, Renaissance Revival, Bungalow, American Craftsman, Gothic Revival, Shingle Style, Romanesque Revival, Late 19th and 20th Century American Movements
- NRHP reference No.: 08001098
- Added to NRHP: November 26, 2008

The Robbins Park Historic District is a set of three hundred and sixty-eight buildings in Hinsdale, Illinois. Two hundred and thirty-two of these builds contribute to its historical value. The district was platted by William Robbins in the 1860s and 1870s following the completion of the Chicago, Burlington and Quincy Railroad. Wealthy entrepreneurs moved to the district beginning in the 1890s due to its natural beauty and proximity to major golf resorts. The district was added to the National Register of Historic Places in 2008 and features two houses previously honored by the register.

== History ==
The Chicago, Burlington and Quincy Railroad (CB&Q) was opened in 1862 and added a station in modern-day Hinsdale, Illinois two years later. Before the station was built, real estate developer William Robbins purchased 700 acres (2.8 km^{2}), the first land in Hinsdale, including a lot for his own home. He platted the Town of Hinsdale in 1866, almost all of which was south of the railroad tracks. Robbins advertised the land in Chicago newspapers and built cottages and a school to promote residential development. He added land to the town later in 1866 and in 1871. Horace W. S. Cleveland was hired to plat the 1871 addition, which was in the emerging curvilinear style instead of the predominant gridiron plan. Curvilinear plans spared the local environment, maneuvering around large trees and hills. The Robbins Parks Addition was one of Cleveland's first ventures in the Midwest.

The Great Chicago Fire caused many Chicago residents to reconsider a move to the suburbs, resulting in a population boom. The Highlands train station, just north of the Robbins Park district was added to the CB&Q in 1873. By this time, the population of Hinsdale was 1,500. Hinsdale issued bonds to improve its public works, resulting in running water, electricity, and a sewage system for the town. Streets were paved with asphalt and brick. The Hinsdale Golf Club, opened west of Hinsdale in 1899, prompted wealthy patrons to move near the club. Hinsdale's reputation grew as one of Chicago's most beautiful suburbs of Chicago, and several publications heralded the architectural styling of the town.

Local entrepreneurs flocked to the Robbins Park district. William Whitney was a member of the Illinois House of Representatives and first proposed legislation to incorporate Hinsdale. His house is independently listed on the National Register of Historic Places (NRHP). William Gibson Barfield was a local architect who designed the Hinsdale Theater and the Hinsdale State Bank, as well as many of the Robbins park residences. Howard George Hetzler was the President of the Metropolitan West Side Elevated Railroad and the Superintendent of the Chicago division of the CB&Q. Charles G. Root was a partner of the United States Gypsum Corporation. Orland P. Bassett, whose house is also on the NRHP, was the first to commercially sell the American Beauty rose.

== Architecture ==
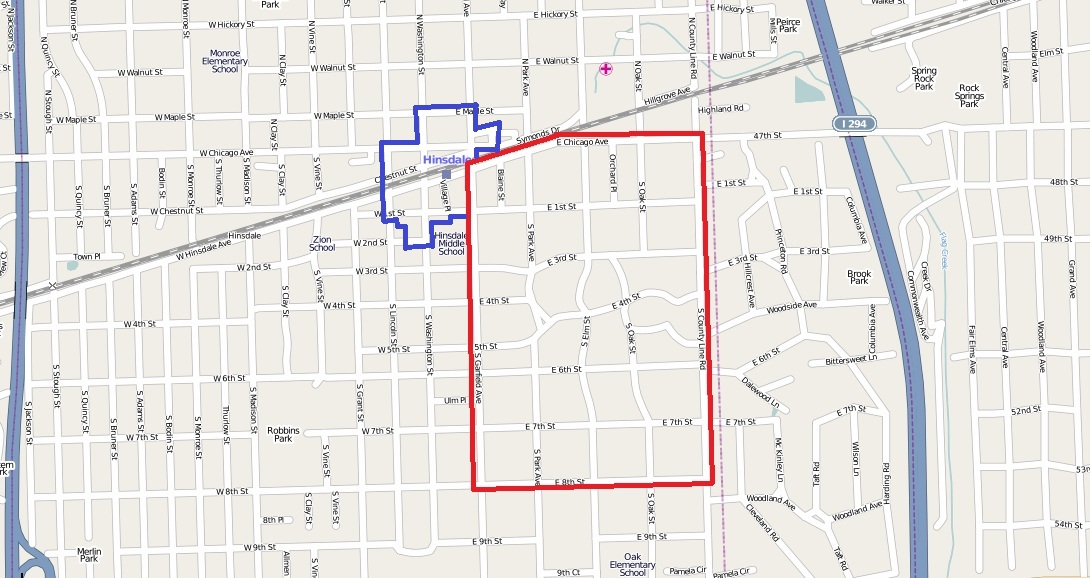
Location of Robbins Park Historic District (red) within Hinsdale. The Downtown Hinsdale Historic District is in blue.

The earliest homes in the district represent the Gothic Revival style, including Robbins' own. The most popular style of building in the district is Colonial Revival (sixty-three buildings). Most structures are from the Late Victorian era, but there are a few examples of more modern American Craftsman and bungalow designs. Four contributing houses are of Italianate design and thirty-two are Queen Anne style. The district is almost entirely residential, with the exception of four churches and two non-contributing businesses.

The Boston, Massachusetts firm of Shepley, Rutan and Coolidge designed the George H. and Carrie R. Mitchell House at 244 E. First Street in 1893. Eben Ezra Roberts designed the 1910 Prairie School Albert Wilson True House at 231 E. Third Street. Fellow Oak Park native John S. Van Bergen was the architect of the 1923 Harold Klock Residence at 306 S. County Line Road. Schmidt, Garden and Erickson was responsible for two Colonial residences, built in 1934 and 1937. Solon Spencer Beman, who designed the first company town of Pullman, Illinois, also designed the Church of Christ, Scientist building in the district in 1951.

== See also ==
- Downtown Hinsdale Historic District, also platted by William Robbins
