= Immanuel Hall =

Church in Illinois, United States

- Immanuel Evangelical Church
- U.S. National Register of Historic Places
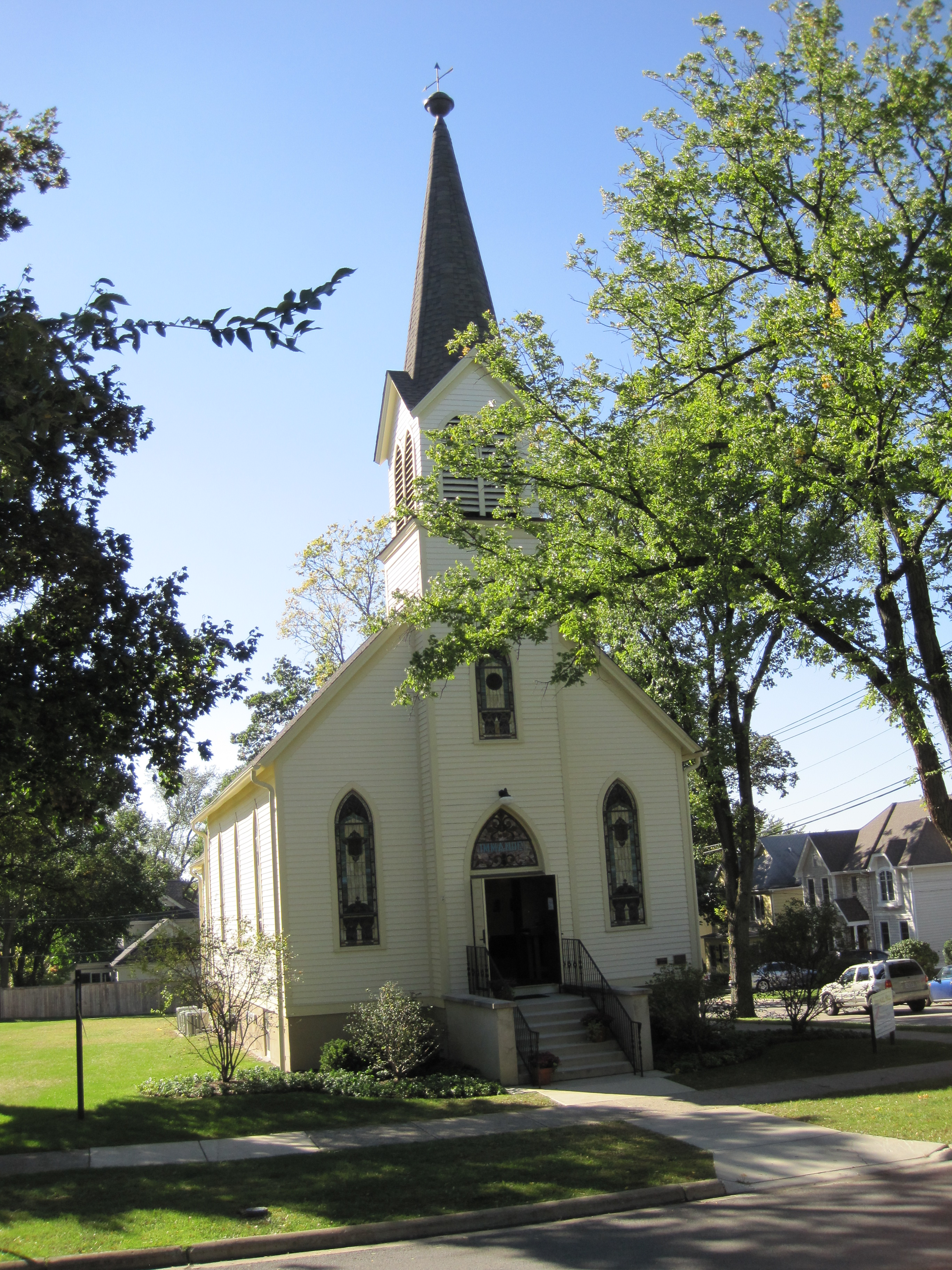

- Location within Illinois Location within the United States
- Location: 302 S. Grant St. Hinsdale, DuPage County, Illinois, U.S.
- Coordinates: 41°47′57″N 87°55′56″W
- Built: 1900
- Architectural style: Late Gothic Revival (Carpenter Gothic)
- NRHP reference No.: 01000085
- Added to NRHP: February 9, 2001

Immanuel Hall, previously known as Immanuel Evangelical Church, is a historic Late Gothic Revival church in the Carpenter Gothic style located in Hinsdale, Illinois. Saved from demolition in 1999, renovated, and reopened to the public, the building, renamed Immanuel Hall, is owned and operated as the headquarters and Archives of the Hinsdale Historical Society. It was added to the National Register of Historic Places in early 2001. It is located in a residential neighborhood approximately two blocks west and two blocks south of Hinsdale's business district, the Downtown Hinsdale Historic District.

== History ==
In the late 19th century, the west side of Hinsdale was home to a community of Lutheran German immigrants. The churchgoers would walk over five miles to the north every Sunday to attend St. John Evangelical Church of Fullersburg. In 1898, while at odds with the church's new pastor and tired of the weekly journey, several parishioners decided to establish their own congregation and called on Brookfield pastor Rev. Carl Luedeke to lead the new Deutsche Evangelisch Lutherische Kirche.

Luedeke pushed the idea of building the church which materialized in 1900. The church was built by Hinsdalean William Vornsand, the contractor, and all the carpentry was done by members. The church was built in just eight weeks and cost only $3,000 due to the all-volunteer crew.

When construction was completed, the congregation, then numbering approximately 30 families, used the building for services and social activities. The church's back room was furnished with desks and benches for the Sunday School and on Saturdays, the minister held class there to teach the children reading and writing in high German.

Services in the building were conducted in the German language until the 1930s, when the church became affiliated with the Evangelical and Reformed Church and began services in English.

In 1920, in a sign of the church's growing membership and increasing budget, the steeple was replaced and the church was elevated in order to dig a basement for socials and gatherings. The raised concrete portion on the east side of the basement was used as a stage and still exists as part of the Hinsdale Historical Society's Roger and Ruth Anderson Architecture Center (RRAAC). Also in 1920, a two-story frame American four-square style house was constructed immediately on the west side of the church and was used as a parsonage.

In 1923, a six-rank pipe organ (402 pipes) was purchased from M. P. Moller Pipe Organ Company and installed. The following year, ten stained glass windows were purchased from the Flanagan & Biedenweg Studios, Chicago and installed in the nave.

In 1964, the congregation, now numbering over 160 families, moved to a new building in Burr Ridge, Illinois. The former church was then used as an office for the United Church of Christ. The church grounds were sold in 1982, and the building operated as a Montessori method preschool.

== Preservation and Current Use ==
In 1998, the property became available when the site was listed for sale and demolition seemed imminent. This was an era in Hinsdale, and nationally, when teardowns had become rampant and several significant historic properties in the village had already been lost.

In 1999, the building was sold to a private party and targeted for demolition by the new owners. Hearing of the sale, the Hinsdale Historical Society worked successfully with Village and State officials, and residents of Hinsdale, to save the church building from demolition. The parsonage and the brick building were demolished as part of the purchase agreement. In order to save the stained glass windows and avoid the suggestion of the village supporting a religious property, the village requested the removal of all religious symbolism prior to the purchase. To comply, the Christian cross was removed from the steeple and the stained glass windows were purchased in a separate financial transaction between the seller and the Hinsdale Historical Society.

Just prior to the Hinsdale Historical Society formally taking possession of the building in 2001, Immanuel Hall was listed on the National Register of Historic Places. Two years prior, after the purchase of the building, it had been designated as Hinsdale's first historic landmark by the village government.

After the Hinsdale Historical Society took possession of Immanuel Hall, they hired a preservation architect to develop plans to rehabilitate the Hall and, in 2005, launched a major fundraising campaign for the building's restoration. In nine months, the Society achieved its fundraising goal with contributions that came entirely from private donors–the largest contribution, $500,000, came from the family of Roger and Ruth Anderson and helped establish the Roger and Ruth Anderson Architecture Center (RRAAC), a long-planned preservation and construction resource service of the Society located in the lower level of the Hall.

The building was restored from 2007 to 2008. The extensive project included the addition of a 17 by 21 foot rear addition, the most obvious exterior feature of the project, as well as a complete remodel of the lower level for the RRAAC, and refurbishment of the original features in the upper level and exterior of the building.

Today, Immanuel Hall is used by the Hinsdale Historical Society for public events and is home to the RRAAC, the Society's vast Archives, and its headquarters.
