= Clarendon Hills station =

Commuter rail station in Illinois, United States

Clarendon Hills

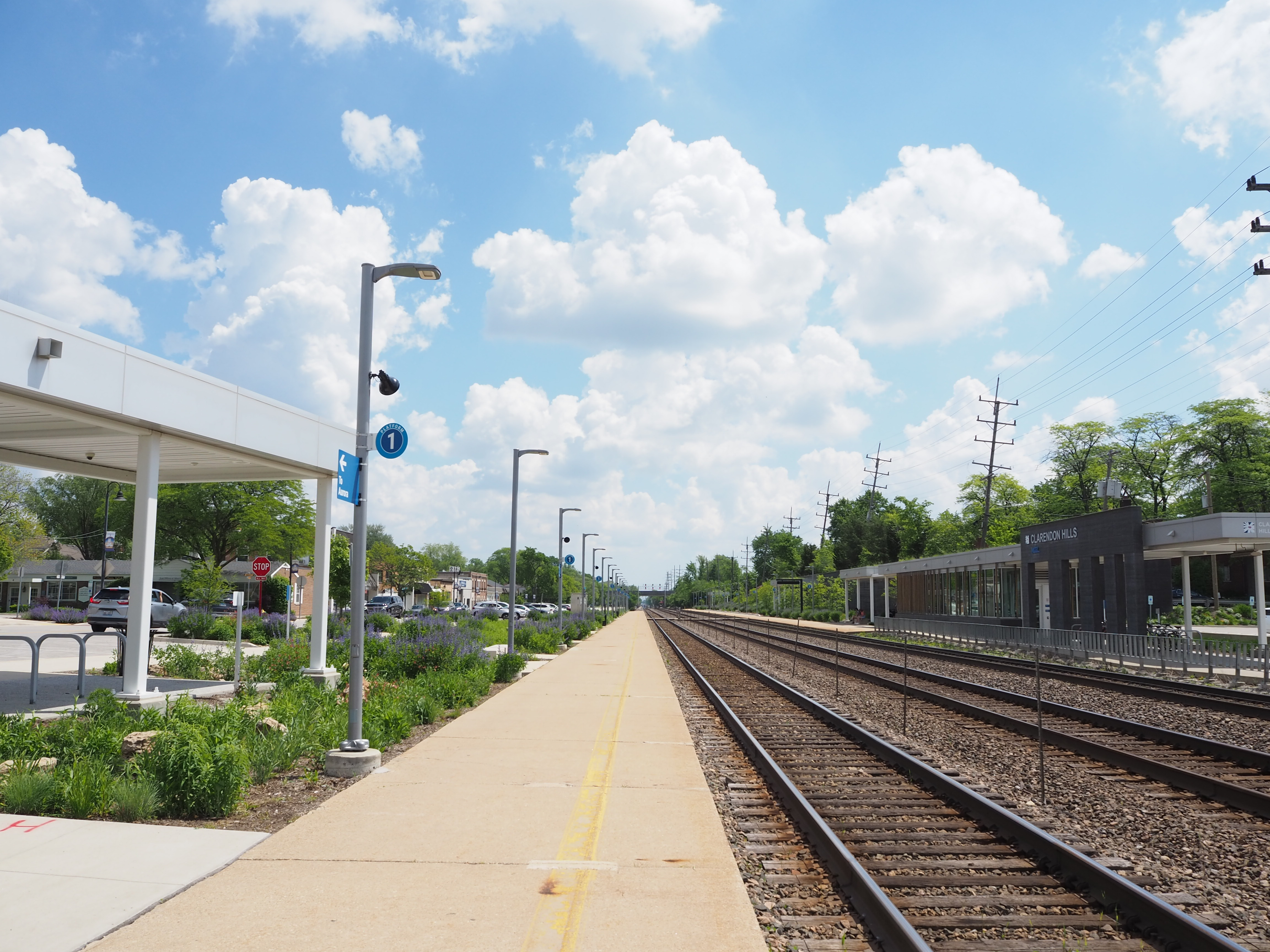
- Clarendon Hills Station in May 2024

General information
- Location: 1 South Prospect Avenue; Clarendon Hills, Illinois
- Coordinates: 41.7971°N 87.9535°W
- Owner: Metra
- Line: BNSF Chicago Subdivision
- Platforms: 2 side platforms
- Tracks: 3
- Connections: Pace Buses

Construction
- Accessible: Yes, partial (Note: At partially accessible stations, customers using mobility devices can access and use trains; however, the stations may not have other accessibility features such as accessible bathrooms, Braille signage, visual display announcements, etc.)

Other information
- Fare zone: 3

Passengers
- 2018: 799 (average weekday) ▼0.9%
- Rank: 66 out of 236

Services
Preceding station	Metra	Following station
Westmont toward Aurora	BNSF	West Hinsdale Weekday Limited toward Union Station
Former services
Preceding station	Burlington Route	Following station
Westmont toward Aurora	Suburban Service	West Hinsdale toward Chicago
Westmont toward Minneapolis	Minneapolis – Chicago	Hinsdale toward Chicago
Track layout
Location

Clarendon Hills is a station on Metra's BNSF Line in Clarendon Hills, Illinois. The station is 18.3 rail miles (29.5 km) from Chicago Union Station, the east end of Metra service on this line. In Metra's zone-based fare system, Clarendon Hills is in zone 3. As of 2018, Clarendon Hills is the 66th busiest of Metra's 236 non-downtown stations, with an average of 799 weekday boardings.

The inbound station building (south of the tracks) was staffed until June 11, 2018. It later was replaced with an unstaffed building. Groundbreaking was on Jan 6, 2020; ribbon-cutting was on Nov 7, 2022. The outbound side has only two small covered shelters, one of which also provides bicycle racks and the other is a weather-protected warming center. Clarendon Hills' central business district is directly southwest of the station.

As of September 8, 2025, Clarendon Hills is served by 59 trains (30 inbound, 29 outbound) on weekdays, and by 36 trains (18 in each direction) on weekends and holidays.

On May 11, 2022, an inbound Metra train collided with a truck stopped on the tracks at the Prospect Avenue grade crossing. One passenger aboard the train was killed; two train employees and two passengers were injured.
