= Walter Theodore Krausch =

American architect

Walter Theodore Krausch, known as W.T. Krausch (1868–1929), was an American architect, engineer, and inventor who worked for the Chicago, Burlington and Quincy Railroad (CB&Q) from the late 1880s to the 1920s.

== Life ==
Krausch was born at Philadelphia, Pennsylvania June 11, 1868, the son of Theodore and Emma (Heide) Krausch. He was educated at Evanston High School, at a technical school at Buffalo, New York, and by private tutoring.

Although associated with the firm of Theodore Krausch & Company, architects and engineers, at Buffalo, New York from 1888 to 1891, Krausch began work for the CB&Q in 1888. The 1892 Directory of La Grange, Illinois, lists his profession as draughtsman. The CB&Q appointed him to the position of architect by 1901.

Krausch was appointed engineer of buildings by the CB&Q in April, 1912. His responsibilities, including designing buildings and supervising construction, were wide-ranging, but probably typical of such a position. Examples include awarding a contract for construction of a large coaling plant at Prairie du Chien, Wisconsin, to the Roberts & Schaefer Company in 1913; in March 1922 directing preparation of a report on the effects of a fire in the CB&Q office building in Chicago and lessons to be learned; supervising preparation in March 1922 of plans for the station and power house in Aurora, Illinois; in April 1922 receiving bids for construction of a freight house in Chicago; directing the CB&Q's Building Department in work related to the railroad's grade separation project in Aurora, Illinois, in 1922; in August 1922 receiving bids to construct a bridge over the Platte River near Oreapolis, Nebraska.

Krausch was active in professional organizations: he presented the report of the Standing Committee entitled "Modern Locomotive Coaling Station. Design, Construction, Operation and Maintenance" to the sixth annual convention of the International Railway Fuel Association at Chicago in May, 1914; presented a paper on coaling plants and fuel economy to a meeting of the Western Railway Club in Chicago November 19, 1917; was a member of Committee XXIII Shops and Locomotive Terminals of the American Railway Engineering Association in 1921 and 1922; at the annual meeting of the Railway Fire Protection Association at Washington in October 18, 1922, spoke briefly of the recent burning of the CB&Q general office building in Chicago; was a member of the Western Society of Engineers and presented a paper to the Society on "Design of Railway Locomotive Terminals" on March 23, 1923.

As an inventor Krausch developed and patented a number of railroad-related mechanical devices, both alone and with E.F. Weber, assistant engineer, and with Robert Elder.

His personal and social life was centered around La Grange, Illinois. Krausch married Clara Ann Shordiche of La Grange on January 5, 1891. He was a member of the board of trustees of the Village of La Grange from 1909. He was a Republican, an Episcopalian, a Mason, and a member of the Grand Royal Arch Chapter at La Grange. His involvement at Emmanuel Episcopal Church involved serving on its building committee following destruction of the old church to fire. He belonged to the Chicago Engineers' Club, the Suburban Club of La Grange, and the Edgewood Golf Club. Krausch died at his home in La Grange on December 9, 1929.

== Works ==
Structures which Krausch is credited with planning for the CB&Q and other railroads noted include:

- Station, Brush Hill (Hinsdale), Illinois (1899), Renaissance Revival style, a contributing building to the Downtown Hinsdale Historic District NRHP 06000011, still in use on the Metra BNSF Line.
- Station, Creston, Iowa (1899), NRHP 73000739
- Station, Riverside, Illinois (1901), still in use on the Metra BNSF Line
- Stone Avenue Station, La Grange, Illinois (1901), still in use on the Metra BNSF Line
- Station, Glenwood, Iowa (1904)
- Station, Malvern, Iowa (1904)
- Depot, Beatrice, Nebraska
- Depot, Grand Island, Nebraska (1911) NRHP 14001013
- Depot, Hamburg, Iowa (1913)
- Station, Sandwich, Illinois (1913)
- Fuel oil station, Englewood, South Dakota (1913)
- Fuel oil station, Edgemont, South Dakota (1913)
- [Macomb station], Macomb, Illinois (1913)
- Water tower and coaling station, Sioux City, Iowa (1917)
- Freight terminal, Chicago, Illinois (1919)
- Station, Kirksville, Missouri (1920), Quincy, Omaha and Kansas City Railroad
- Station, Aurora, Illinois (1922)
- Roundhouse, Rock Island, Illinois (1922)
- Roundhouse, Council Bluffs, Iowa (1922)
- Freight house, Chicago, Illinois (1922)
- Station, Afton Junction, Iowa (1922)
- Freight house, Cicero, Illinois (1922)
- Locomotive repair shops, Denver, Colorado (1922), CB&Q and Colorado and Southern Railroad
- Station, Lincoln, Nebraska (1927), Neo-classical revival style

== Patents ==
Patents received, alone and with others, included:

- 839,858: Hoisting bucket, Automatic dumping and righting, January 1, 1907
- 1,067,343: Hoisting mechanism, October 31, 1911, with Robert Elder, assigned to Fairbanks, Morse & Company
- 1,222,708: Hoisting and conveying mechanism, assigned to Fairbanks, Morse & Company, December 29, 1914
- 1,243,187: Car, Rail-drilling, October 16, 1917, with E.F. Weber
- 1,243,188: Car, Track-laying, October 16, 1917, with E.F. Weber
- 1,243,189: Car, Tie-sawing, October 16, 1917, with E.F. Weber
- 1,356,155: for a storage structure, October 19, 1920
- 1,498,735: Smokejack and the like, January 2, 1923

== Gallery ==
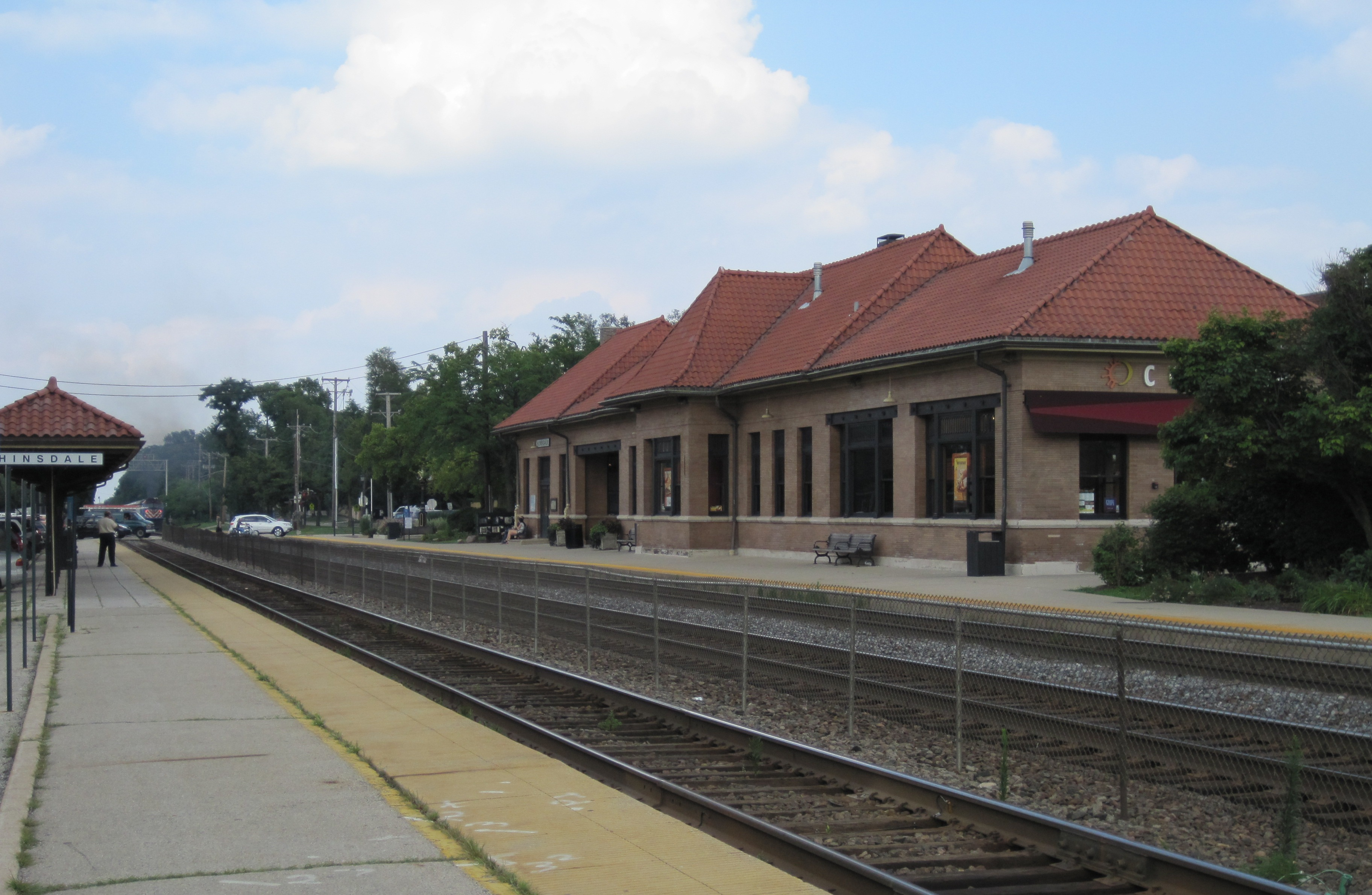
Brush Hill (Hinsdale) Station

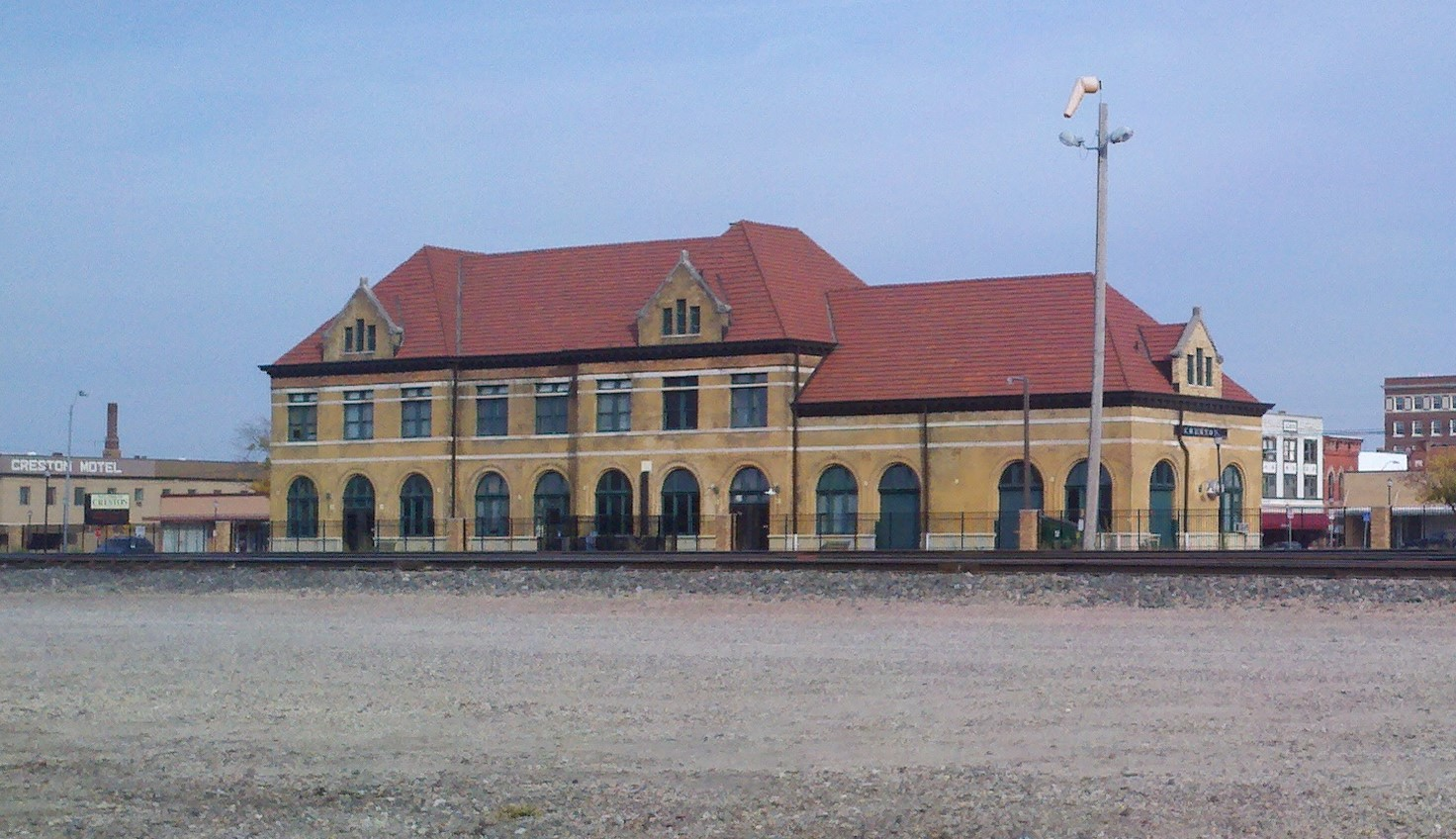
Creston Station

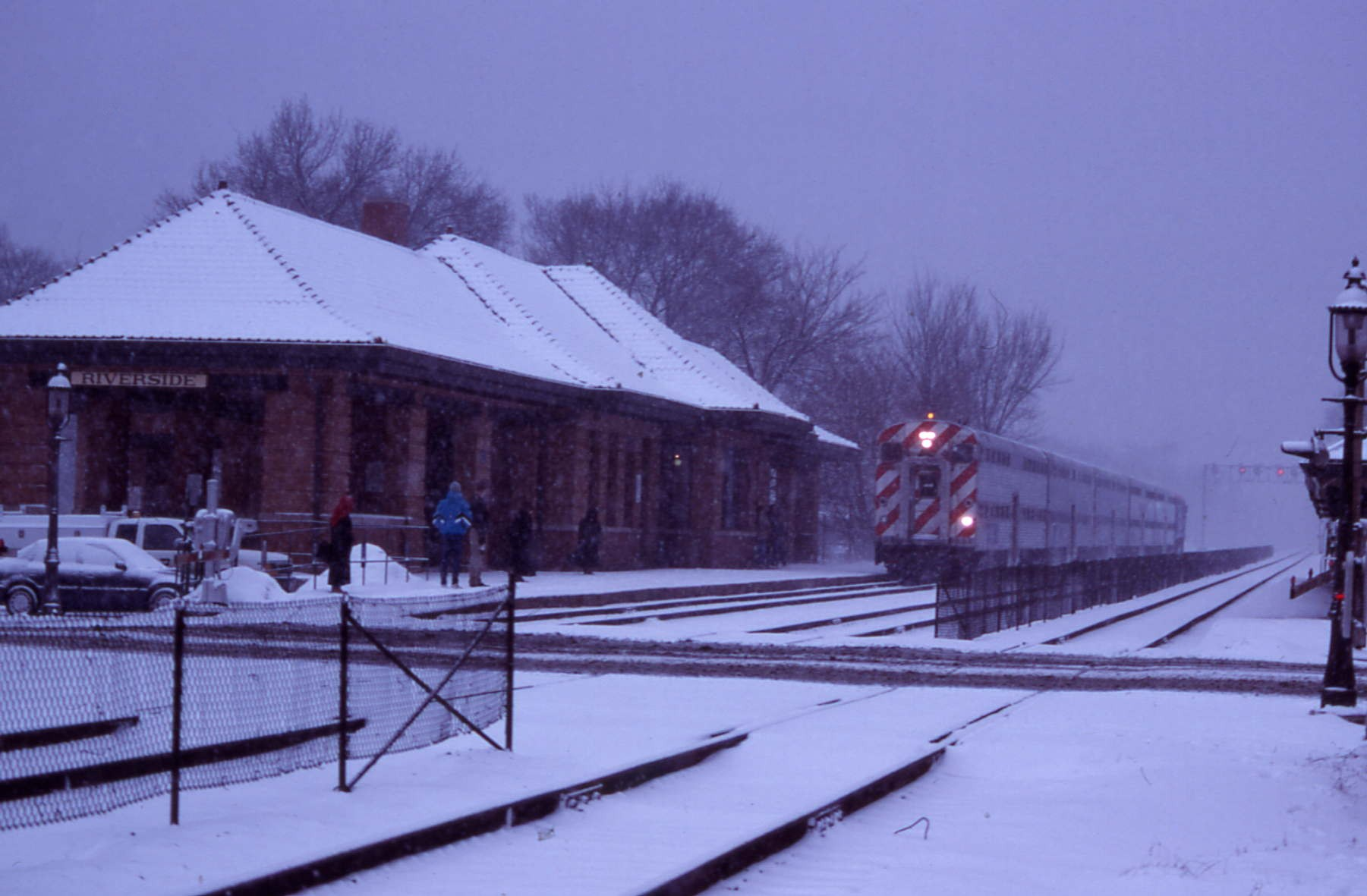
Riverside Station

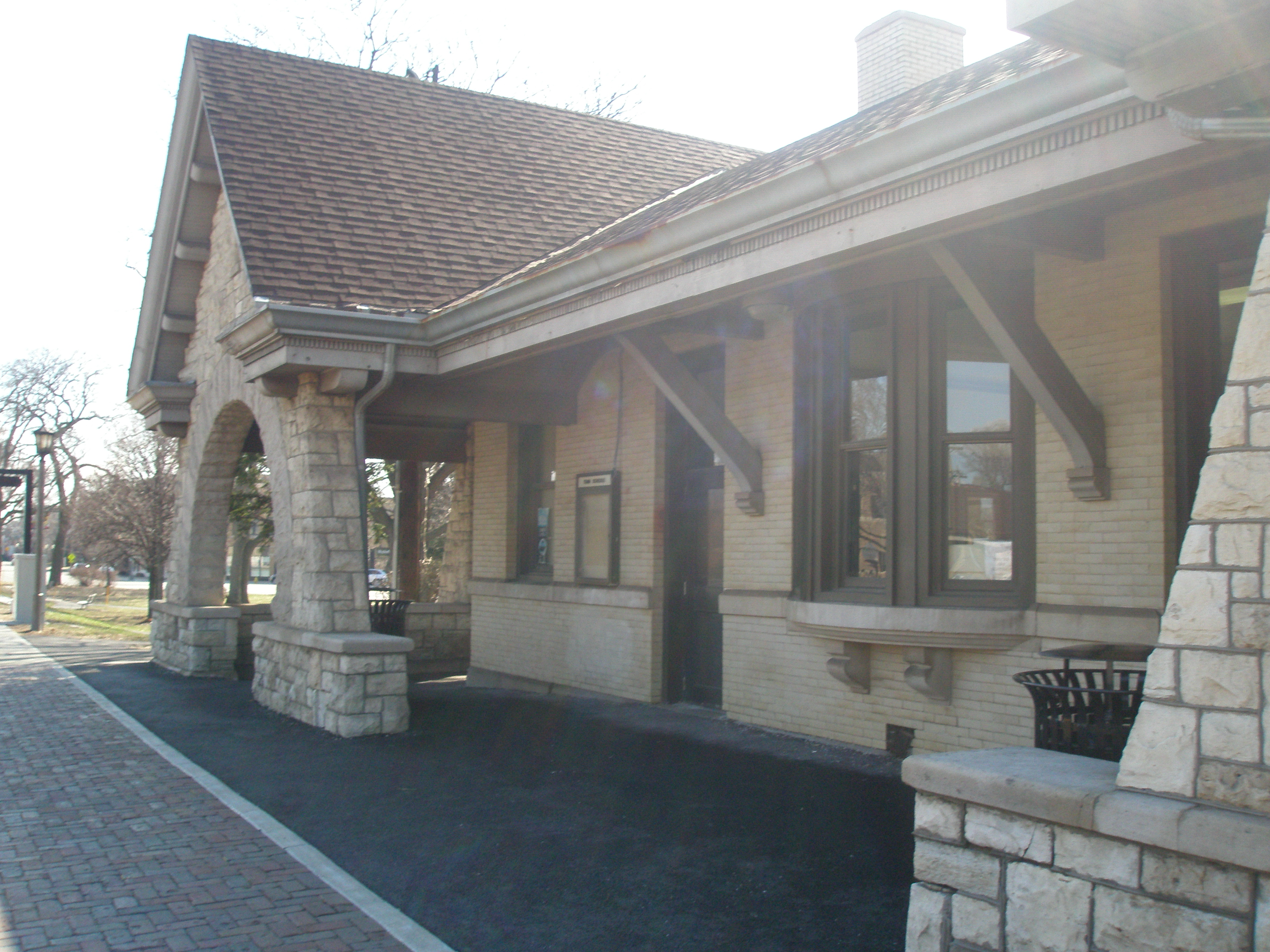
La Grange Stone Avenue Station

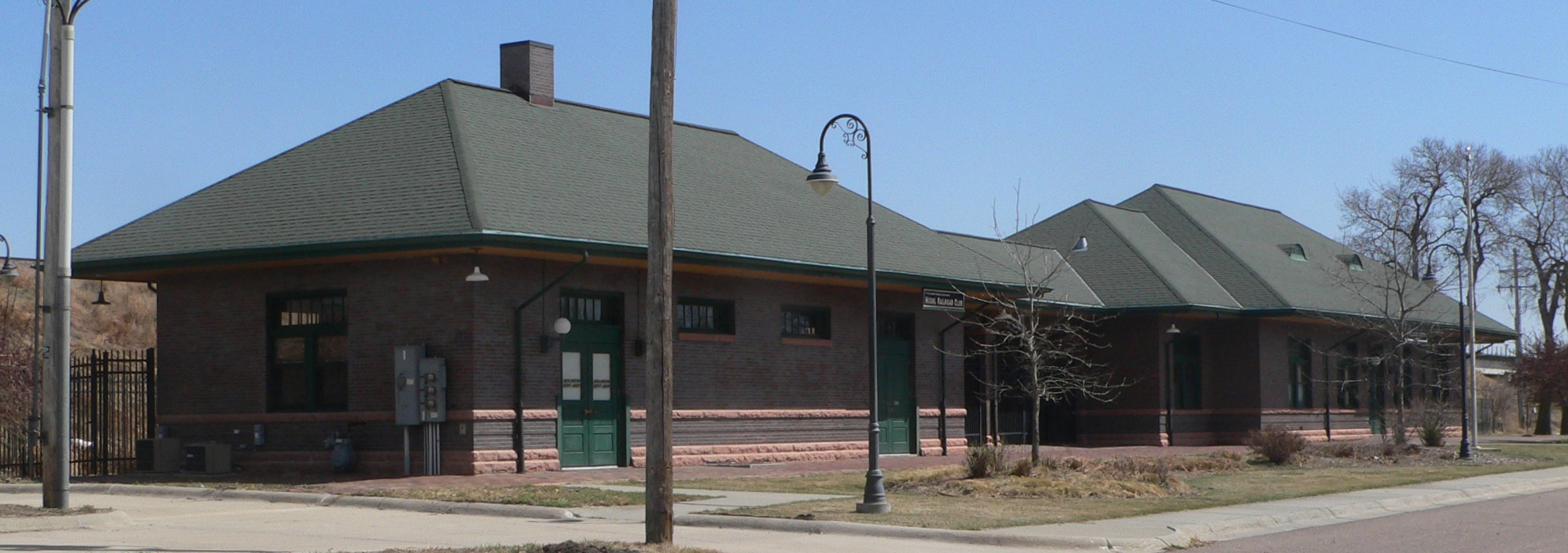
Grand Island

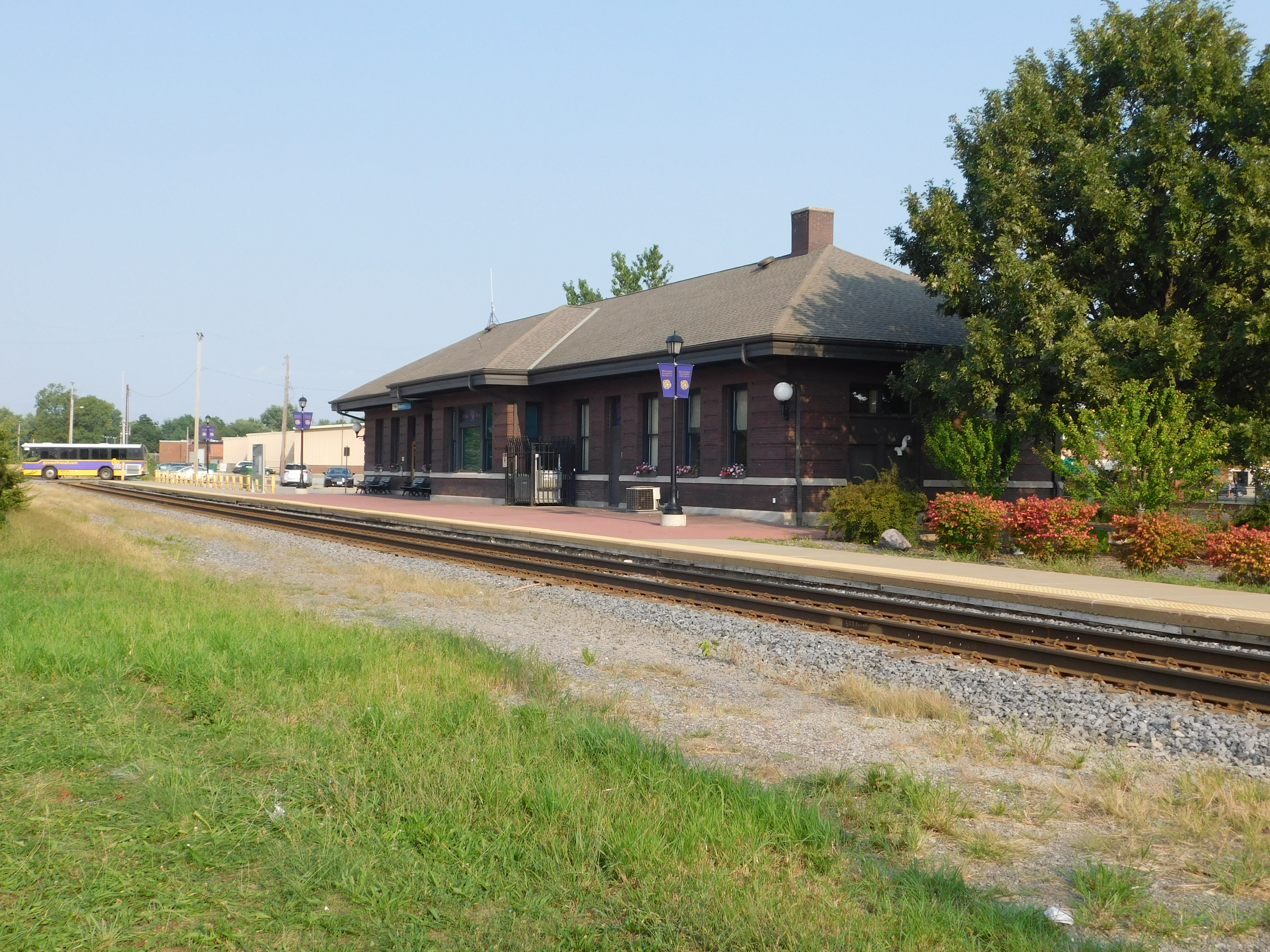
Macomb Station

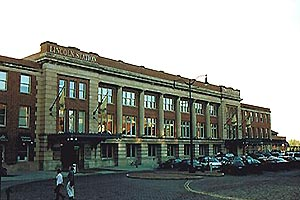
Lincoln Depot
