= Western Springs station =

Commuter rail station in Western Springs, Illinois

Western Springs

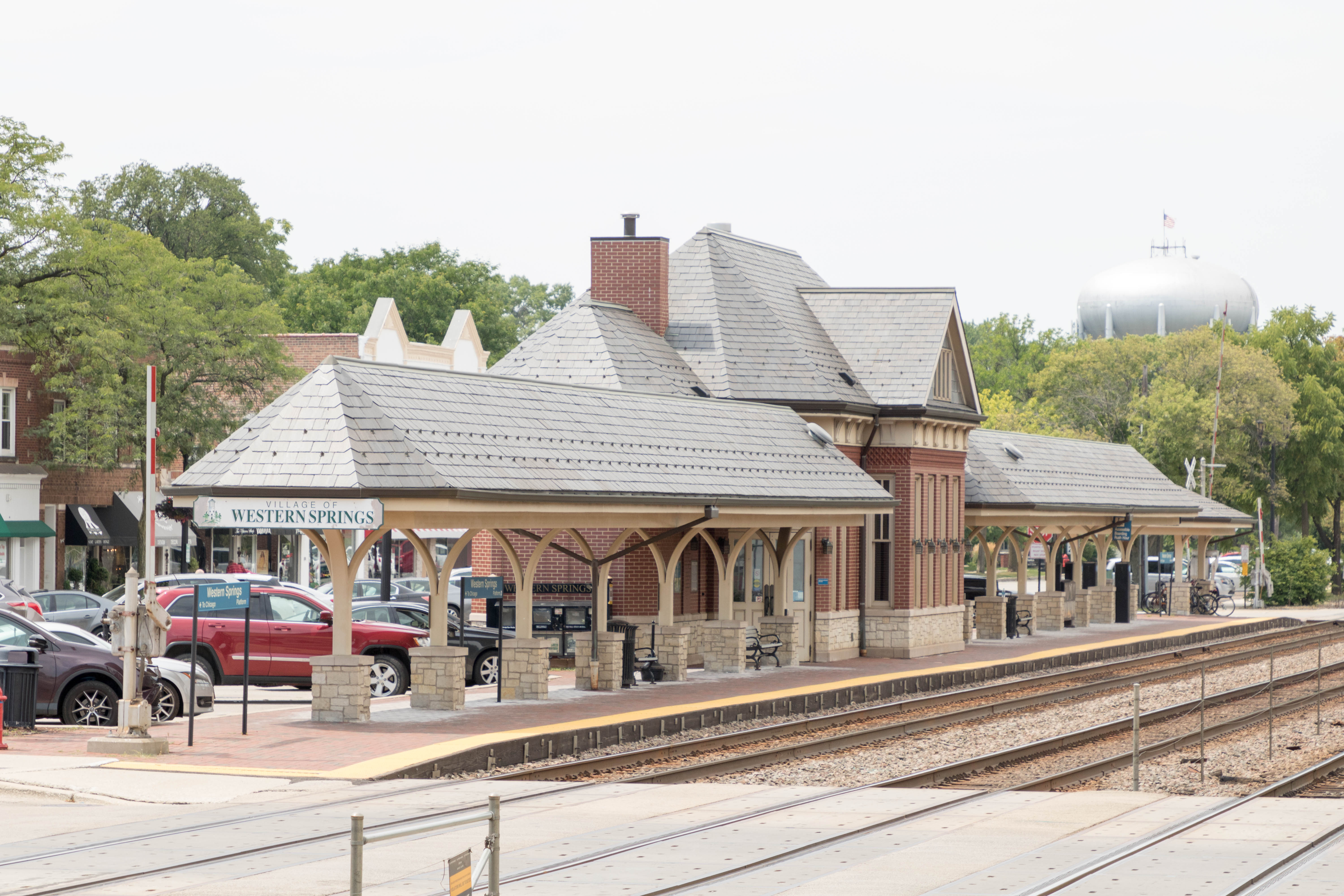

General information
- Location: 914 Burlington Avenue; Western Springs, Illinois
- Coordinates: 41.8090°N 87.9011°W
- Owner: Village of Western Springs
- Line: BNSF Chicago Subdivision
- Platforms: 2 side platforms
- Tracks: 3

Construction
- Parking: Yes
- Accessible: Yes

Other information
- Fare zone: 3

History
- Opened: 1915
- Rebuilt: 1972, 2004, 2008

Passengers
- 2018: 1,134 (average weekday) ▲0.1%
- Rank: 38 out of 236

Services
Preceding station	Metra	Following station
Highlands Weekday Limited toward Aurora	BNSF	Stone Avenue Weekday Limited toward Union Station
Former services
Preceding station	Burlington Route	Following station
Highlands toward Aurora	Suburban Service	Stone Avenue toward Chicago
Track layout
Location

Western Springs is a station on Metra's BNSF Line in Western Springs, Illinois. The station is 15.4 miles (24.8 km) from Union Station, the east end of the line. In Metra's zone-based fare system, Western Springs is in zone 3. As of 2018, Western Springs is the 38th busiest of Metra's 236 non-downtown stations, with an average of 1,134 weekday boardings. There is a staffed station building. During the spring and summer of 2008 the north platform of the station was rebuilt to match the architecture of the station building.

As of September 8, 2025, Western Springs is served by 59 trains (30 inbound, 29 outbound) on weekdays, and by 36 trains (18 in each direction) on weekends and holidays.
