= West Hinsdale station =

Commuter rail station in Hinsdale, Illinois

West Hinsdale

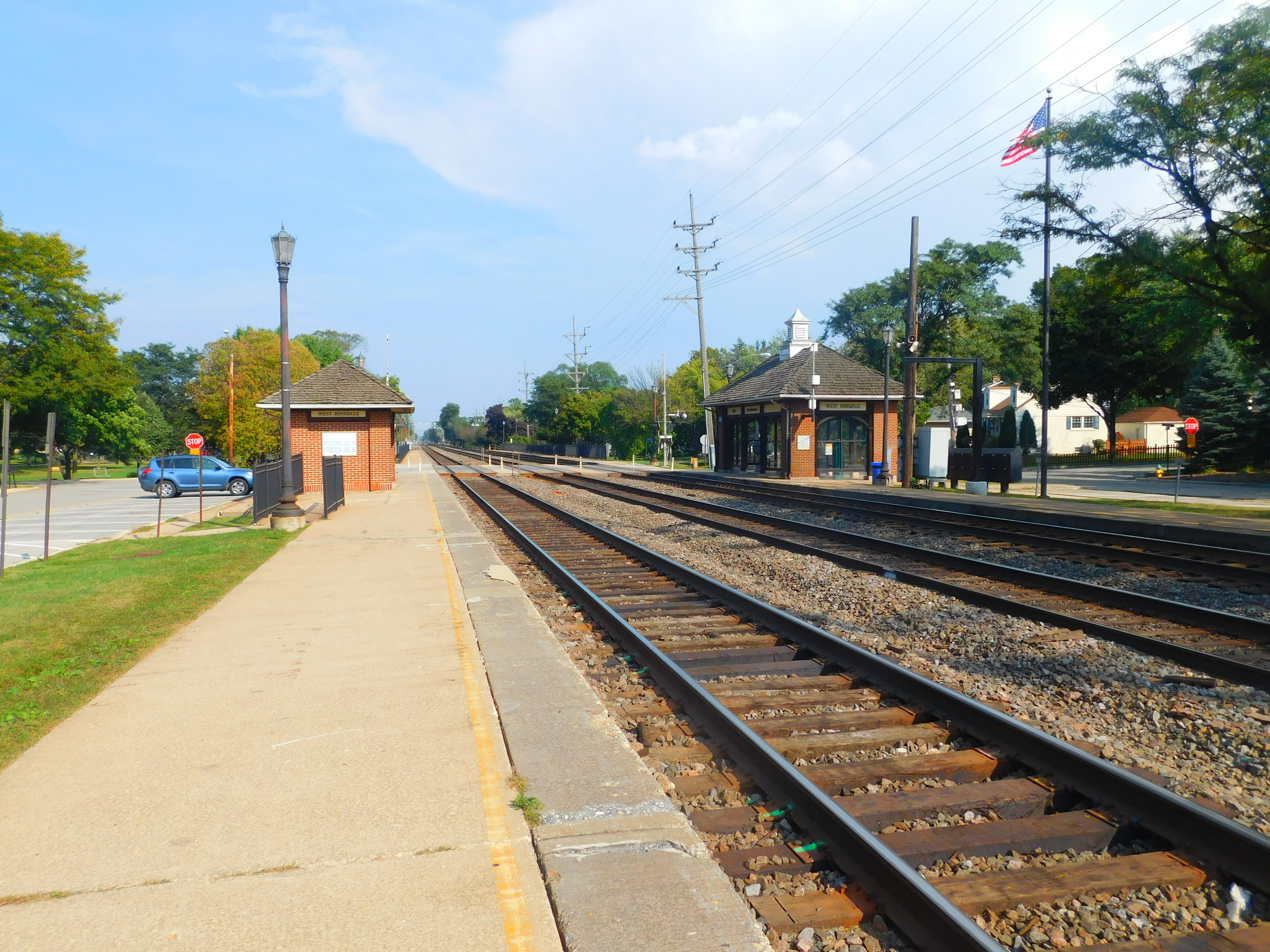

General information
- Location: Hinsdale Avenue & Stough Street; Hinsdale, Illinois
- Coordinates: 41.7990°N 87.9454°W
- Owner: Metra
- Line: BNSF Chicago Subdivision
- Platforms: 2 side platforms
- Tracks: 3

Construction
- Parking: Yes
- Accessible: Yes

Other information
- Fare zone: 3

History
- Opened: ca. 1875
- Rebuilt: ca. 1982

Passengers
- 2018: 306 (average weekday) ▼18.6%
- Rank: 143 out of 236

Services
Preceding station	Metra	Following station
Clarendon Hills toward Aurora	BNSF	Hinsdale toward Union Station
Former services
Preceding station	Burlington Route	Following station
Clarendon Hills toward Aurora	Suburban Service	Hinsdale toward Chicago
Track layout
Location

West Hinsdale is one of three stations on Metra's BNSF Line in Hinsdale, Illinois. The station is 17.8 miles (28.6 km) from Union Station, the eastern terminus of the line. It is closed on weekends and holidays. In Metra's zone-based fare system, West Hinsdale is in zone 3. As of 2018, West Hinsdale is the 143rd busiest of Metra's 236 non-downtown stations, with an average of 306 weekday boardings. There is an unstaffed weather shelter used only during rush hour. The station is immediately adjacent to Stough Park in Hinsdale and is located 0.5 miles from downtown Clarendon Hills, Illinois.

As of September 8, 2025, West Hinsdale is served by 26 trains (13 in each direction) on weekdays.
