= Stone Avenue/LaGrange station =

Commuter rail station in La Grange, Illinois

Stone Avenue/LaGrange

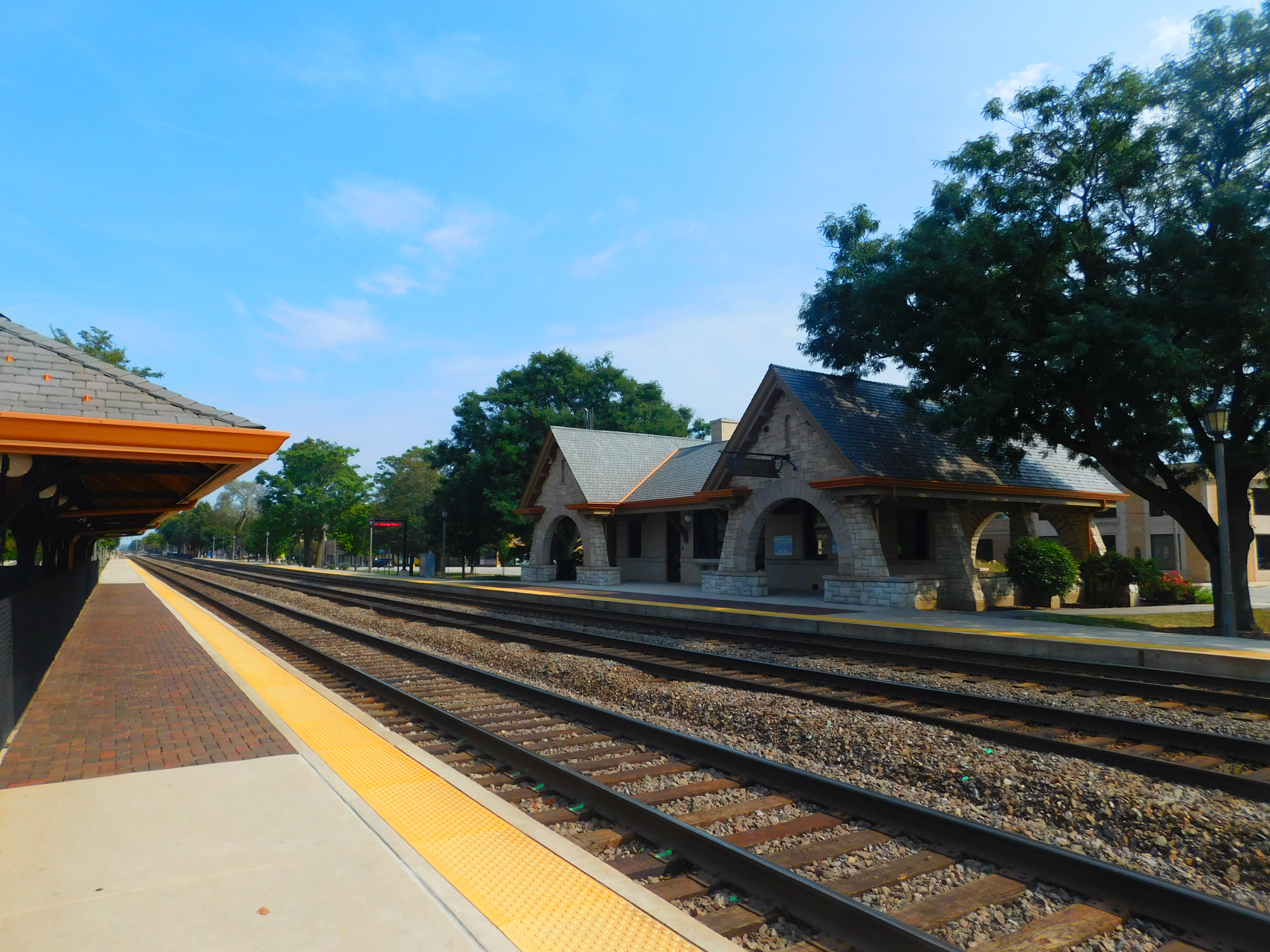

General information
- Location: 701 West Burlington Avenue; La Grange, Illinois
- Coordinates: 41.8141°N 87.8783°W
- Owner: Village of La Grange
- Line: BNSF Chicago Subdivision
- Platforms: 2 side platforms
- Tracks: 3

Construction
- Parking: Yes
- Accessible: Yes

Other information
- Fare zone: 3

History
- Opened: 1901
- Rebuilt: 2010

Passengers
- 2018: 946 (average weekday) ▼9.6%
- Rank: 55 out of 236

Services
Preceding station	Metra	Following station
Western Springs toward Aurora	BNSF	LaGrange Road toward Union Station
Former services
Preceding station	Burlington Route	Following station
Western Springs toward Aurora	Suburban Service	La Grange toward Chicago
Track layout
Location

Stone Avenue (also known as La Grange–Stone Avenue) is a station on Metra's BNSF Line in La Grange, Illinois. The station is 14.1 miles (22.7 km) from Union Station, the east end of the line. In Metra's zone-based fare system, Stone Avenue is in zone 3. As of 2018, Stone Avenue is the 55th busiest of Metra's 236 non-downtown stations, with an average of 946 weekday boardings. An unstaffed station building is on the south side of the three tracks.

Like the other La Grange Metra station (La Grange Road), La Grange-Stone Avenue is between West Burlington and West Hillgrove Avenues. Stone Avenue, the road for which the station is named, is actually a minor street which terminates at West Burlington Avenue in front of the station, only to begin again at a dead end street south of Bell Avenue. The closest major street to the station is Brainard Avenue. The station is within walking distance of the North Campus of Lyons Township High School. It is 0.4 miles (0.64 km) from the main La Grange station.

The station was built in 1901 by the Chicago, Burlington and Quincy Railroad, to a Richardsonian Romanesque design by the company's general architect, Walter Theodore Krausch.

As of September 8, 2025, Stone Avenue is served by 26 trains (13 in each direction) on weekdays.
