= Westmont station (Illinois) =

Commuter rail station in Westmont, Illinois

Westmont

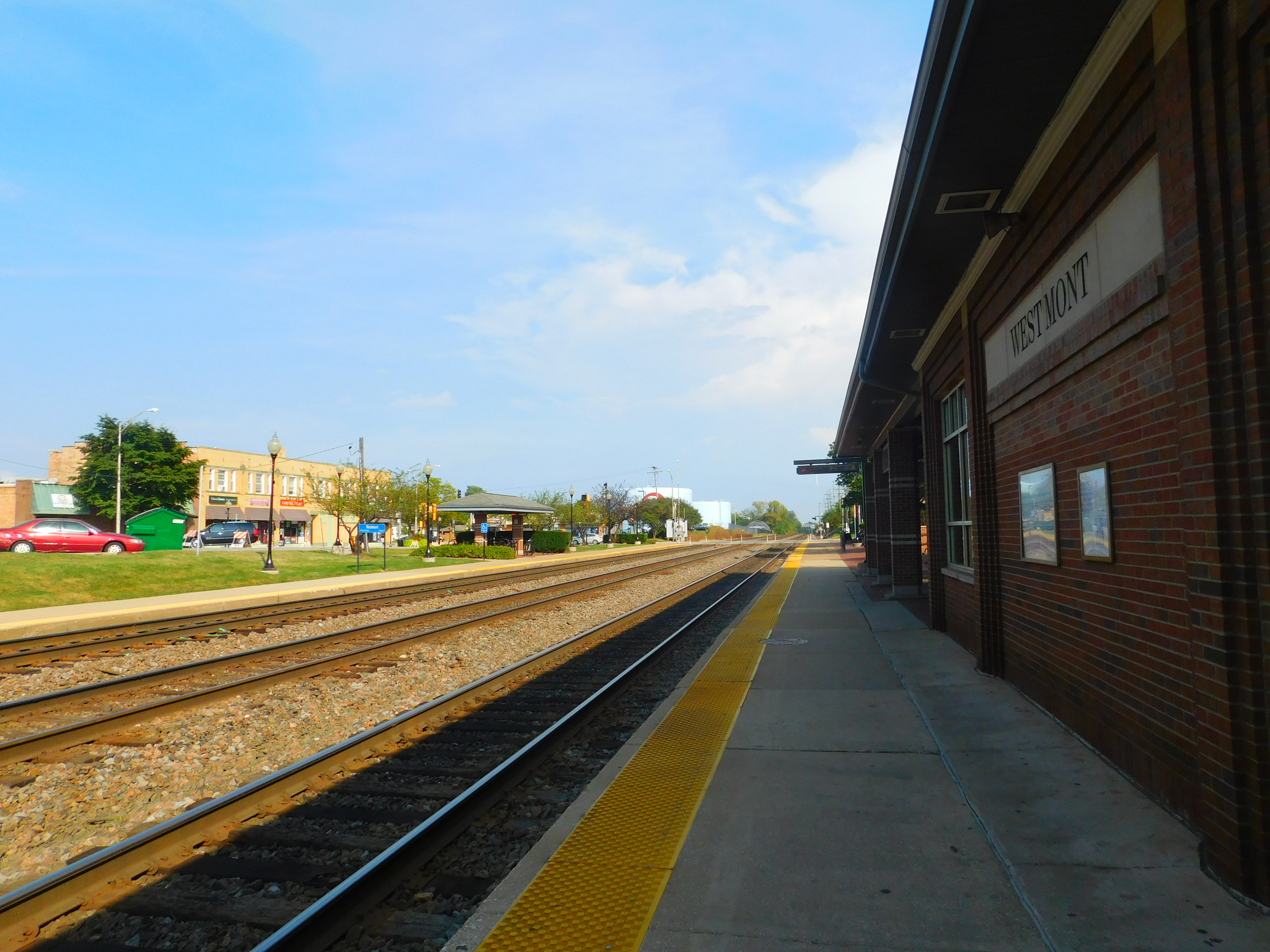

General information
- Location: 18 West Quincy Street; Westmont, Illinois
- Coordinates: 41.7955°N 87.9764°W
- Owner: Village of Westmont
- Line: BNSF Chicago Subdivision
- Platforms: 2 side platforms
- Tracks: 3
- Connections: Pace Buses

Construction
- Accessible: Yes

Other information
- Fare zone: 3

Passengers
- 2018: 1,083 (average weekday) ▲2.4%
- Rank: 44 out of 236

Services
| Preceding station | Metra | Following station |
|---|---|---|
| Fairview Avenue toward Aurora | BNSF | Clarendon Hills toward Union Station |
Former services
| Preceding station | Burlington Route | Following station |
|---|---|---|
| Fairview Avenue toward Aurora | Suburban Service | Clarendon Hills toward Chicago |
| Downers Grove toward Minneapolis | Minneapolis – Chicago | Clarendon Hills toward Chicago |
Track layout
Location

Westmont is a station on Metra's BNSF Line in Westmont, Illinois. The station is 19.4 miles (31.2 km) from Union Station, the east end of the line. In Metra's zone-based fare system, Westmont is in zone 3. As of 2018, Westmont is the 44th busiest of Metra's 236 non-downtown stations, with an average of 1,083 weekday boardings. There is a staffed station building across the street from the Westmont Village Hall. The station house is diagonally across from the Village Hall at West Quincy and South Lincoln Streets.

As of September 8, 2025, Westmont is served by 64 trains (32 in each direction) on weekdays, and by 36 trains (18 in each direction) on weekends and holidays.

== Bus connections ==
Pace

- 715 Central DuPage
