= William L. Gregg House =

Historic house in Illinois, United States

- U.S. National Register of Historic Places
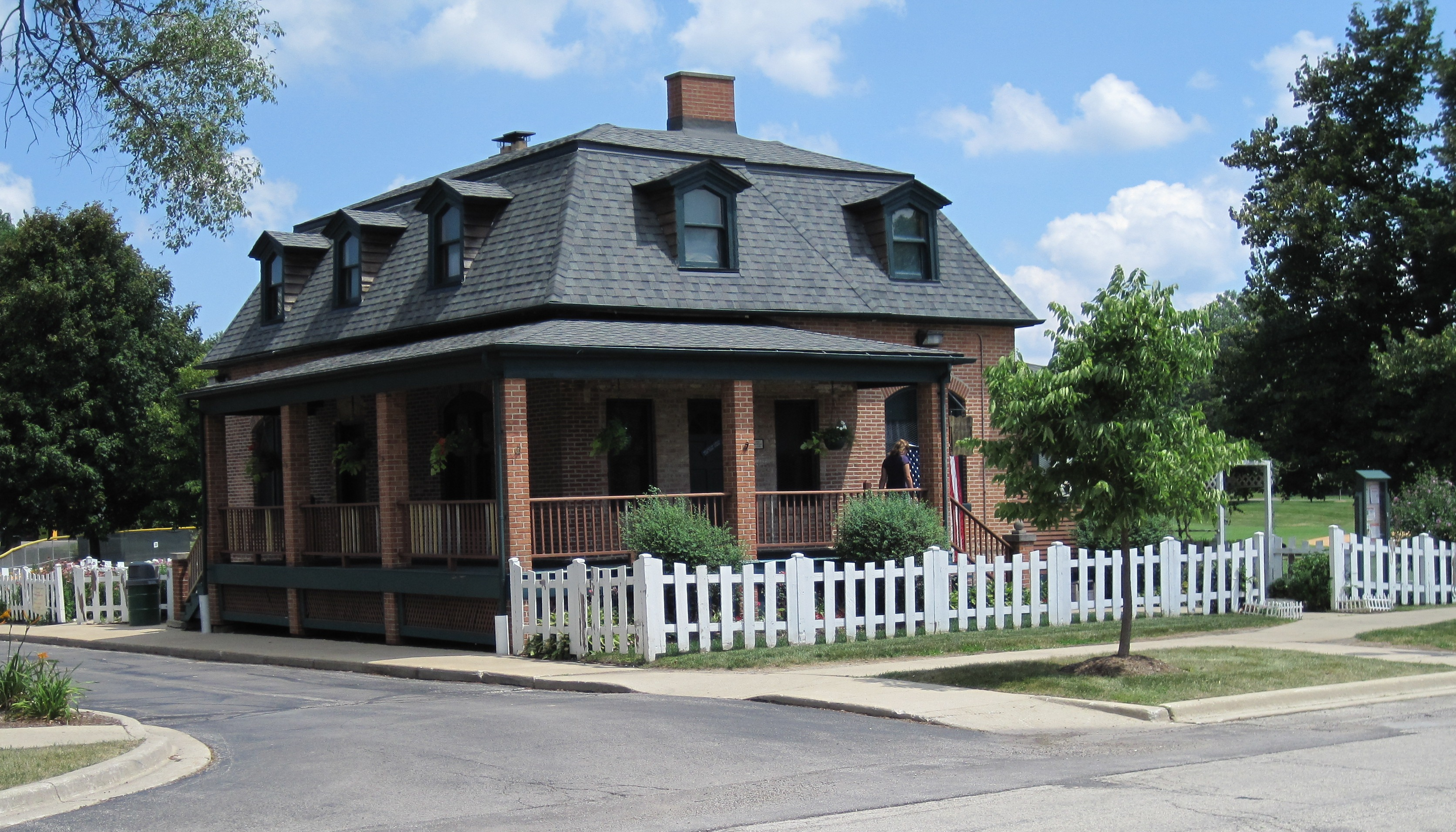

- Location within Illinois Location within the United States
- Location: 117 S. Linden Ave; Westmont, DuPage County, Illinois
- Coordinates: 41°47′35″N 87°58′24″W
- Area: less than one acre
- Built: 1872; 154 years ago
- Architectural style: Victorian (Second Empire)
- NRHP reference No.: 80004526
- Added to NRHP: October 3, 1980

The William L. Gregg House is a historic Victorian building in the Second Empire style located in Westmont, Illinois.

== History ==
Following the completion of the Chicago, Burlington and Quincy Railroad in 1864, shares of the land that was to become Westmont were sold to Phipps Industrial Land Trust. Following the Great Chicago Fire in late 1871, this land was again sold to several brick manufacturers to accelerate the regrowth of the city.

William L. Gregg owned the highest point of land near the railroad, allowing for easy export of brick by steam locomotive. Gregg constructed a house atop the hill to showcase the product of the Excelsior Brick Company. After the population of Chicago re-stabilized in the early 20th century, demand for brick was reduced and the house was rented and re-purposed for a variety of functions. The dilapidated house was considered for demolition in the 1970s, but a historical group restored the house. It was added to the National Register of Historic Places in 1980; The following year, it became the Westmont Historical Society museum.

It is currently located on the grounds of Lou Cimera Field in Veterans Memorial Park and is open to the public twice a week.

== Architecture ==
The two-story William L. Gregg House is rectangular brick house. The mansard roof is steep with overhanging gable dormers. Double-hung windows are decorated with arch brick heads, except for the two flanking the main entrance. The side of the house now has a frame sun-porch, which was added in the 1920s. An addition was also made to the rear of the house at this time. Although the floor plan of the interior is intact, little of its original design remains. The house was moved a short distance and placed on a new foundation in 1977.
