= Community Consolidated School District 181 =

School district in Clarendon Hills, Illinois, US

Address
- 115 55th Street Clarendon Hills, Illinois, 60514; United States

District information
- Type: Public
- Grades: PreK–8
- NCES District ID: 1719290

Students and staff
- Students: 3,631

Other information
- Website: www.d181.org

Community Consolidated School District 181 (D181), also known as Hinsdale Elementary School District 181 or Hinsdale-Clarendon Hills District 181, is a school district headquartered in Clarendon Hills, Illinois. In addition to a portion of Clarendon Hills, the district boundaries include Hinsdale and portions of Burr Ridge and Oak Brook. It is in DuPage County.

As of 2026, Jim Wipke serves as the superintendent for the district.

== History ==
Prior to 1990 the middle school only had grades 7–8. In 1990 it had 2,600 students. That year the district planned to move 6th graders to the middle school, but it faced parental opposition.

The district has been recognized as one of the state’s premier public school systems along with best teachers in Illinois. In ranking of the state’s elementary schools and middle schools, all seven of District 181’s institutions came in among the top 10.

== Schools ==
Middle schools (Grade 6-8)

- Hinsdale Middle School
- Clarendon Hills Middle School

Elementary schools (PreK-Grade 5)

- Elm School
- Madison School
- Monroe School
- Oak School
- Prospect School
- The Lane School
- Walker School
