= Westmont, Illinois =

Westmont
- Village
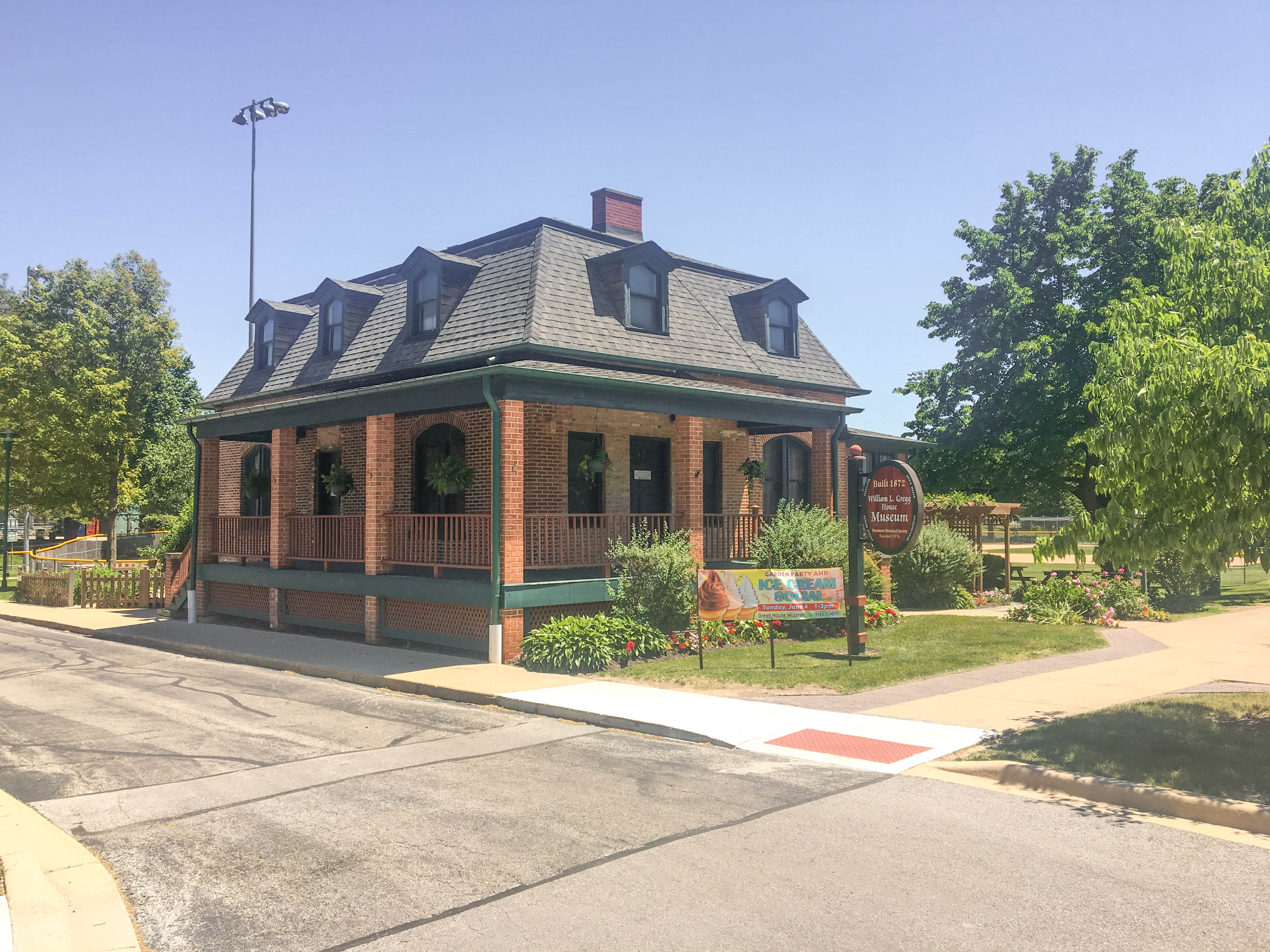
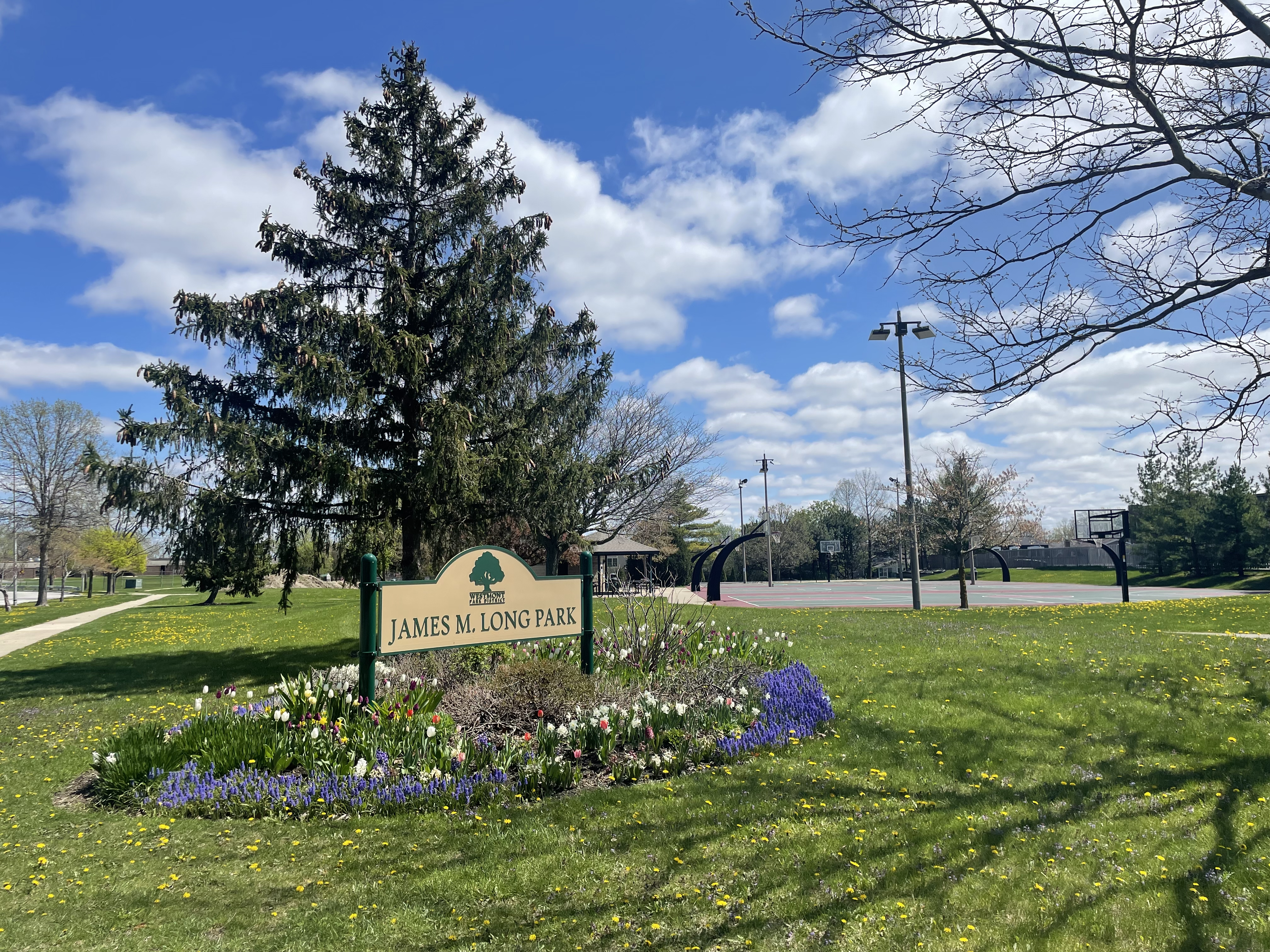
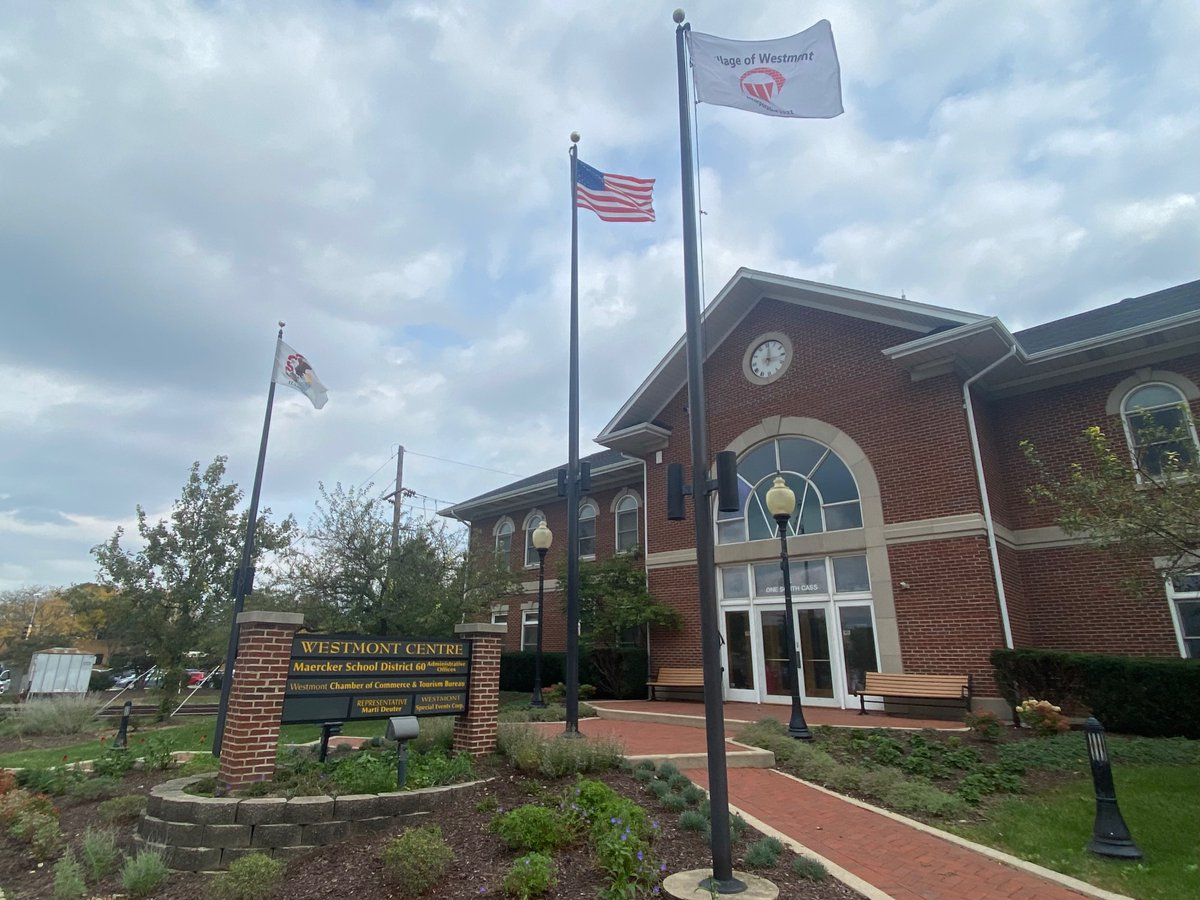
- Aerial view of downtown William L. Gregg House James M. Long Park Westmont Centre

- Flag Logo
- Nicknames: "Whiskey Hill", "Wet-mont", "Bestmont"
- Mottoes: "The Progressive Village", "In The Middle Of It All"
- Location of Westmont in DuPage County, Illinois.
- Coordinates: 41°47′41″N 87°58′27″W
- Country: United States
- State: Illinois
- County: DuPage
- Township: Downers Grove, York
- Incorporated: 1921

Government
  - Type: Mayor-trustee

Area
  - Total: 5.11 sq mi (13.23 km^{2})
  - Land: 5.00 sq mi (12.96 km^{2})
  - Water: 0.10 sq mi (0.27 km^{2})
- Elevation: 761 ft (232 m)

Population (2020)
  - Total: 24,429
  - Density: 4,881.8/sq mi (1,884.88/km^{2})
- Up 15.67% from 1990

Standard of living
  - Per capita income: $26,394 (median: $51,422)
  - Home value: $200,814 (median: $180,200 (2000))
- Time zone: UTC-6 (CST)
  - Summer (DST): UTC-5 (CDT)
- ZIP code: 60559
- Area codes: 630 and 331
- FIPS code: 17-80645
- GNIS feature ID: 2400153
- Website: www.westmont.illinois.gov

Demographics (2000)
Demographic	Proportion
White	78.02%
Black	6.38%
Hispanic	6.98%
Asian	11.95%
Islander	0.00%
Native	0.13%
Other	2.41%

Westmont is a village in DuPage County, Illinois, United States. It is a southwest suburb of Chicago. As of the 2020 census, Westmont had a population of 24,429.

== History ==
The area known as Westmont earlier had been inhabited by the Potawatami. After several failed attempts by the U.S. government to persuade the Native Americans to move from the area, in 1833 they agreed under coercion to vacate their land for a nominal payment.

The development of the Illinois-Michigan Canal, authorized by the State of Illinois in the 1820s but delayed in construction until the 1830s, contributed to Westmont's early growth. Many of the workers turned to farming when the economic panic of 1837 halted canal construction; agriculture became the major occupation with produce sold in nearby Chicago. The area around Westmont became one of the most prosperous sections of the state.

In order to transport agricultural products into the city of Chicago, construction of a plank road from Chicago began in 1840. The path traversed the nine-mile (14 km) swamp between Chicago and the area that later became Westmont; it reached Naperville by 1851. Today, this path is known as Ogden Avenue (U.S. Route 34).

The plank road soon became inadequate; in 1858, local incorporated towns and villages petitioned the Chicago, Burlington and Quincy Railroad to build a branch line from Aurora to Chicago that would pass through their towns. The railroad line was approved, with the first train in 1864. "Gregg's Milk Station," from which Westmont developed, was a stop to load agricultural and dairy products. The town transitioned gradually from an agricultural community to a commuter community, with the early growth and development centered around the railroad station.

In the early 1900s, plats for the Village of Westmont were laid out and roads were dedicated; incorporation was decided by a vote of 41–28 in 1921. Westmont was officially incorporated on November 4, 1921; Vince Pastor served as the first president of the Village Board.

Westmont High School opened in 1974, and Westmont Public Library in 1993.

== Geography ==
Westmont is bounded on the north by the Village of Oak Brook, on the east by the Village of Clarendon Hills, on the south by the City of Darien and on the west by the Village of Downers Grove. It is nearly wholly within Downers Grove Township.

According to the 2021 census gazetteer files, Westmont has a total area of 5.11 square miles (13.23 km^{2}), of which 5.00 square miles (12.95 km^{2}) (or 97.94%) is land and 0.11 square miles (0.28 km^{2}) (or 2.06%) is water.

== Demographics ==
Historical population
Census	Pop.	Note	%±
1930	2,733		—
1940	3,044		11.4%
1950	3,402		11.8%
1960	5,997		76.3%
1970	8,832		47.3%
1980	17,353		96.5%
1990	21,228		22.3%
2000	24,554		15.7%
2010	24,685		0.5%
2020	24,429		−1.0%
U.S. Decennial Census

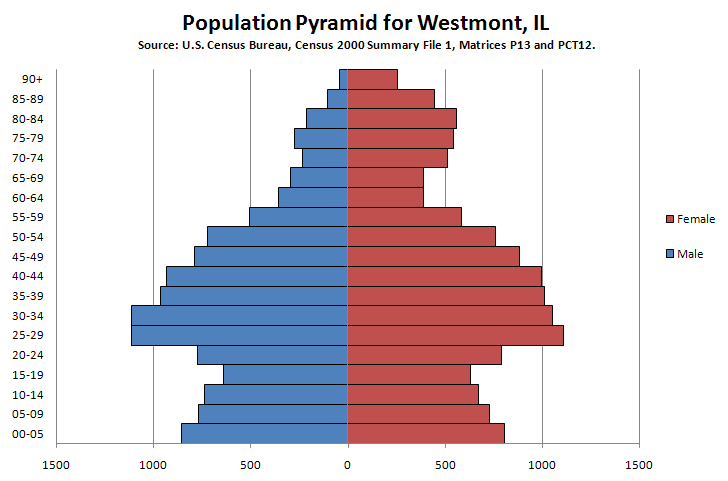
2000 Census population pyramid for Westmont

=== 2020 census ===
As of the 2020 census, Westmont had a population of 24,429, with 10,567 households and 6,175 families residing in the village. The population density was 4,782 inhabitants per square mile (1,846/km^{2}), and housing density was 2,185 per square mile (844/km^{2}).

The median age was 40.2 years. 19.4% of residents were under the age of 18 and 19.2% of residents were 65 years of age or older. For every 100 females there were 90.8 males, and for every 100 females age 18 and over there were 87.2 males age 18 and over.

100.0% of residents lived in urban areas, while 0.0% lived in rural areas.

Of households, 25.9% had children under the age of 18 living in them. Of all households, 43.7% were married-couple households, 18.6% were households with a male householder and no spouse or partner present, and 31.6% were households with a female householder and no spouse or partner present. About 34.4% of all households were made up of individuals, and 15.8% had someone living alone who was 65 years of age or older.

There were 11,161 housing units, of which 5.3% were vacant. The homeowner vacancy rate was 1.4% and the rental vacancy rate was 5.6%.

Racial composition as of the 2020 census
Race	Number	Percent
White	15,842	64.8%
Black or African American	1,702	7.0%
American Indian and Alaska Native	104	0.4%
Asian	3,595	14.7%
Native Hawaiian and Other Pacific Islander	17	0.1%
Some other race	1,344	5.5%
Two or more races	1,825	7.5%
Hispanic or Latino (of any race)	3,107	12.7%

=== Income and poverty ===
The median income for a household in the village was $69,902, and the median income for a family was $97,583. Males had a median income of $54,184 versus $40,258 for females. The per capita income for the village was $43,229. About 8.3% of families and 11.3% of the population were below the poverty line, including 16.0% of those under age 18 and 12.1% of those age 65 or over.

== Economy ==
According to the 2021 Comprehensive Financial Report, the top employers in Westmont are:

#	Employer	# of Employees
1	First Student Charter	270
2	Unit School District 201	256
3	Autonation	255
4	Village of Westmont	218
5	Mariano's	200

The town officially opened a 94 unit luxury residential apartment building dubbed Quincy Station in 2022, a transit-oriented and pet-friendly development. This is intended to be part of a larger effort towards revitalizing the Central Business District in Westmont.

== Transportation ==
Westmont has a Metra station on Metra's BNSF Line, which provides daily rail service between Aurora, Illinois and Chicago's Union Station. U.S. Route 34, Interstate 88 located north of the Village, Interstate 55 to the South, Interstate 294 to the East and Interstate 355 to the West provide road access to the Chicago Region.

Pace provides bus service on Route 715 connecting Westmont to Glen Ellyn and other destinations.

== Notable people ==
- Robbie Russo, professional hockey player from Westmont who plays for the Arizona Coyotes
- Kira Salak, writer and journalist (National Geographic)
- Elton Simpson, one of two suspects of the 2015 Curtis Culwell Center attack in Garland, Texas.
- Ty Warner, industrialist and inventor of Beanie Babies
- Muddy Waters, Chicago blues musician; lived in Westmont before his 1983 death. Muddy Waters Park on 63rd Street is named in his honor.

== See also ==
- William L. Gregg House
