= Hinsdale station =

Commuter rail station in Hinsdale, Illinois

Hinsdale

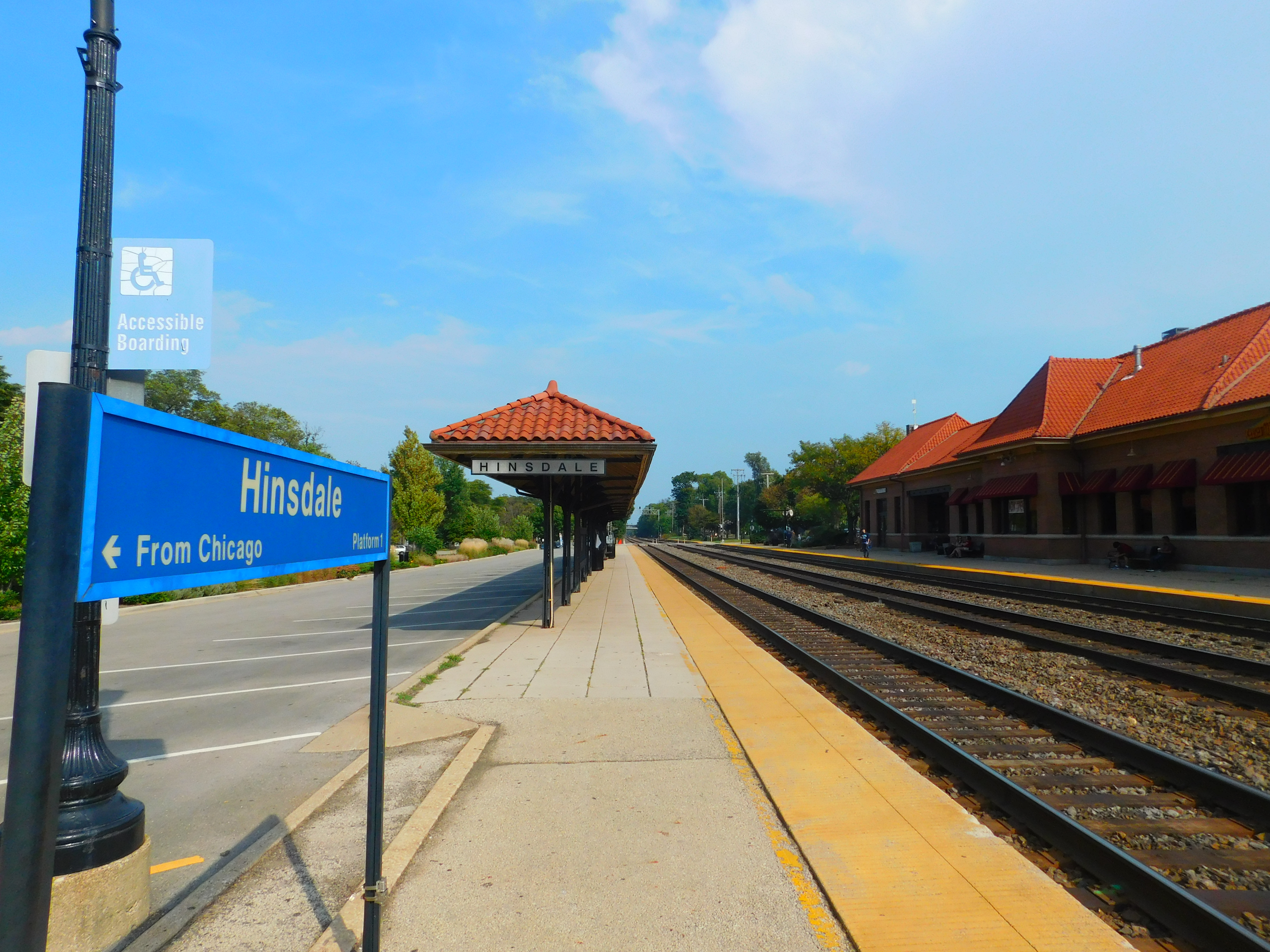

General information
- Location: 21 E Hinsdale Ave; Hinsdale, Illinois
- Owner: Village of Hinsdale
- Line: BNSF Chicago Subdivision
- Platforms: 2 side platforms
- Tracks: 3
- Connections: Pace Bus

Construction
- Parking: Yes
- Accessible: Yes

Other information
- Fare zone: 3

History
- Opened: 1898/1899
- Former names: Brush Hill

Passengers
- 2018: 1,155 (avg. weekday) ▼0.4%
- Rank: 35 out of 236

Services
Preceding station	Metra	Following station
West Hinsdale Weekday Limited toward Aurora	BNSF	Highlands Weekday Limited toward Union Station
Former services
Preceding station	Burlington Route	Following station
West Hinsdale toward Aurora	Suburban Service	Highlands toward Chicago
- Brush Hill Train Station
- U.S. Historic district – Contributing property
- Interactive map of Brush Hill Train Station
- Location: Hinsdale, Illinois, USA
- Coordinates: 41°48′10.08″N 87°55′41.88″W
- Architect: Walter Theodore Krausch
- Architectural style: Renaissance Revival
- Part of: Downtown Hinsdale Historic District (ID06000011)
- Added to NRHP: May 30, 2006
Track layout
Location

Hinsdale is one of three stations on Metra's BNSF Line in Hinsdale, Illinois, and the only one open daily (the other two are only served during rush hours). The station is 16.9 miles (27.2 km) from Union Station, the east end of the line. In Metra's zone-based fare system, Hinsdale is in zone 3. As of 2018, Hinsdale is the 35th busiest of Metra's 236 non-downtown stations, with an average of 1,155 weekday boardings. There is a historic staffed station and commercial use building. Originally known as the Brush Hill Train Station, the depot was designed for the Chicago, Burlington and Quincy Railroad by staff architect Walter Theodore Krausch, built by Grace & Hyde Company in 1899, and is listed as a contributing building in the Downtown Hinsdale Historic District.

As of September 8, 2025, Hinsdale is served by 59 trains (30 inbound, 29 outbound) on weekdays, and by 36 trains (18 in each direction) on weekends and holidays.
