= Hinsdale, Illinois =

Village in the US State of Illinois

- Village
- Village of Hinsdale
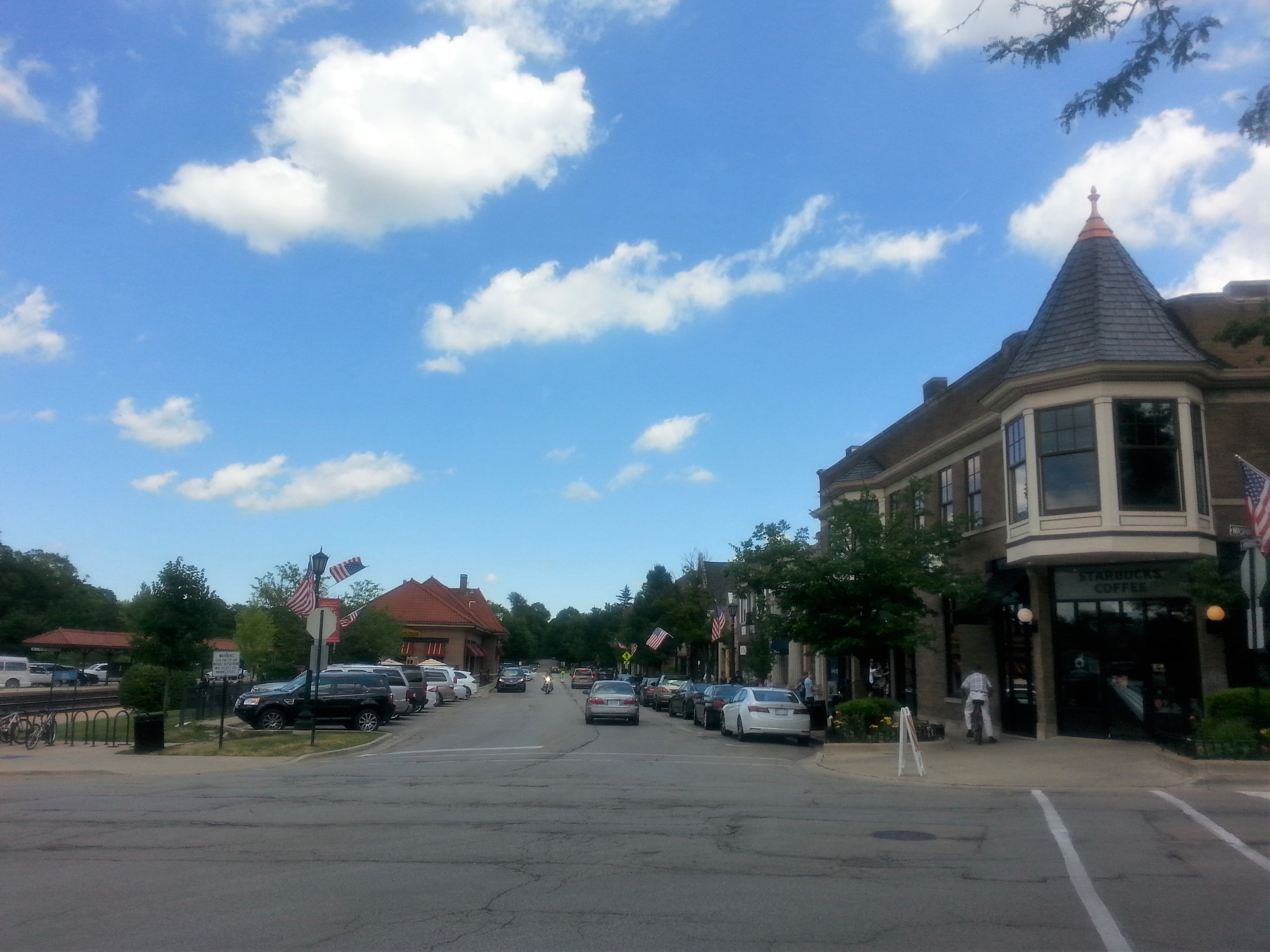
- Downtown Hinsdale, Illinois

- logo

- Location of Hinsdale in DuPage County and Cook County, Illinois.
- Coordinates: 41°48′02″N 87°55′38″W
- Country: United States
- State: Illinois
- Counties: Cook, DuPage
- Townships: Downers Grove, York, Lyons, Proviso
- Incorporated: April 1, 1873

Government
  - Type: Council–manager
  - Village President: Greg Hart

Area
  - Total: 4.66 sq mi (12.07 km^{2})
  - Land: 4.62 sq mi (11.97 km^{2})
  - Water: 0.039 sq mi (0.10 km^{2}) 0.65%
- Elevation: 719 ft (219 m)

Population (2020)
  - Total: 17,395
  - Density: 3,762.6/sq mi (1,452.75/km^{2})
- Down 3.07% from 2000

Standard of living (2015-2019)
  - Per capita income: $114,121
  - Median home value: $969,219
- Time zone: UTC-6 (CST)
  - Summer (DST): UTC-5 (CDT)
- ZIP code: 60521
- Area code(s): 630 and 331
- FIPS code: 17-35307
- GNIS feature ID: 2398514
- Website: www.villageofhinsdale.org

Hinsdale is a village in DuPage County, Illinois, United States, with a small portion in Cook County. It is one of the wealthiest communities in Illinois and in the United States. Hinsdale is a western suburb of Chicago with a population of 17,395 in the 2020 census.

== Geography ==
Hinsdale is 15 miles (24 km) west of the Chicago Loop and is bordered by Oak Brook to the north, Burr Ridge and Willowbrook to the south, Western Springs to the east, and Clarendon Hills and Westmont to the west. The eastern boundary of Hinsdale is Interstate 294 and the western boundary is Route 83.

According to the 2021 census gazetteer files, Hinsdale has an area of 4.66 square miles (12.07 km^{2}), of which 4.62 square miles (11.97 km^{2}) (or 99.18%) is land and 0.04 square miles (0.10 km^{2}) (or 0.82%) is water.

=== Housing and architecture ===
Hinsdale's downtown area is a National Register Historic District. The area is in the center of town and is remarkably little changed despite many teardowns. It includes restaurants, shops, services, and the primary train station.

The Robbins Park district just east of downtown, bounded by Garfield Street and County Line Road, and Hinsdale Avenue and 9th Street, is also a National Register Historic District. It includes two of Hinsdale's seven buildings individually listed on the National Register of Historic Places: the Orland P. Bassett House at 329 E. Sixth St., the Robert A. and Mary Childs House at 318 S. Garfield Ave., Immanuel Evangelical Church at 302 S. Grant St., the Francis Stuyvesant Peabody House at 8 E. Third St., and the William Whitney House at 142 E. First St. The district also includes seven of 17 Hinsdale Historic Landmarks.

Another architectural landmark is the R. Harold Zook Home and Studio, which was saved from demolition in 2005 when it was moved from 327 S. Oak Street to the Katherine Legge Memorial Park, 5941 S. County Line Road.

The Hinsdale Historical Society runs the Roger & Ruth Anderson Architecture Center, which advocates for the preservation of Hinsdale's historical architecture and serves as an archive and resource.

== Demographics ==
Historical population
Census	Pop.	Note	%±
1880	819		—
1890	1,584		93.4%
1900	2,578		62.8%
1910	2,451		−4.9%
1920	4,042		64.9%
1930	6,923		71.3%
1940	7,336		6.0%
1950	8,676		18.3%
1960	12,859		48.2%
1970	15,918		23.8%
1980	16,726		5.1%
1990	16,029		−4.2%
2000	17,349		8.2%
2010	16,816		−3.1%
2020	17,395		3.4%
U.S. Decennial Census

=== Racial and ethnic composition ===
Hinsdale village, Illinois – Racial and ethnic composition Note: the US Census treats Hispanic/Latino as an ethnic category. This table excludes Latinos from the racial categories and assigns them to a separate category. Hispanics/Latinos may be of any race.
Race / Ethnicity (NH = Non-Hispanic)	Pop 2000	Pop 2010	Pop 2020	% 2000	% 2010	% 2020
White alone (NH)	15,884	14,663	13,226	91.56%	87.2%	76.03%
Black or African American alone (NH)	136	212	282	0.78%	1.26%	1.62%
Native American or Alaska Native alone (NH)	9	6	15	0.05%	0.04%	0.09%
Asian alone (NH)	775	1,075	2,161	4.47%	6.39%	12.42%
Pacific Islander alone (NH)	0	5	4	0.00%	0.03%	0.02%
Other race alone (NH)	11	12	54	0.06%	0.07%	0.31%
Mixed race or Multiracial (NH)	120	251	705	0.69%	1.49%	4.05%
Hispanic or Latino (any race)	414	592	948	2.39%	3.52%	5.45%
Total	17,349	16,816	17,395	100.00%	100.00%	100.00%

=== 2020 census ===
As of the 2020 census, Hinsdale had a population of 17,395. There were 4,817 families residing in the village, and the population density was 3,732 inhabitants per square mile (1,441/km^{2}). The median age was 41.5 years. 29.4% of residents were under the age of 18 and 15.5% of residents were 65 years of age or older. For every 100 females there were 96.0 males, and for every 100 females age 18 and over there were 91.6 males age 18 and over.

100.0% of residents lived in urban areas, while 0.0% lived in rural areas.

There were 5,647 households in Hinsdale, of which 46.2% had children under the age of 18 living in them. Of all households, 72.1% were married-couple households, 8.6% were households with a male householder and no spouse or partner present, and 17.4% were households with a female householder and no spouse or partner present. About 15.4% of all households were made up of individuals, 8.9% had someone living alone who was 65 years of age or older, and the average household size was 3.30 with an average family size of 2.94.

There were 6,124 housing units at an average density of 1,314 per square mile (507/km^{2}), of which 7.8% were vacant. The homeowner vacancy rate was 2.1% and the rental vacancy rate was 9.5%.

=== Income and poverty ===
Hinsdale ranked 8th wealthiest suburb in the country. The median income for a household in the village was $250,000+ and the median income for a family was $376,366. Males had a median income of $156,007 versus $56,484 for females. The per capita income for the village was $122,593. About 0.5% of families and 1.9% of the population were below the poverty line, including 0.5% of those under age 18 and 7.0% of those age 65 or over.

== Government ==
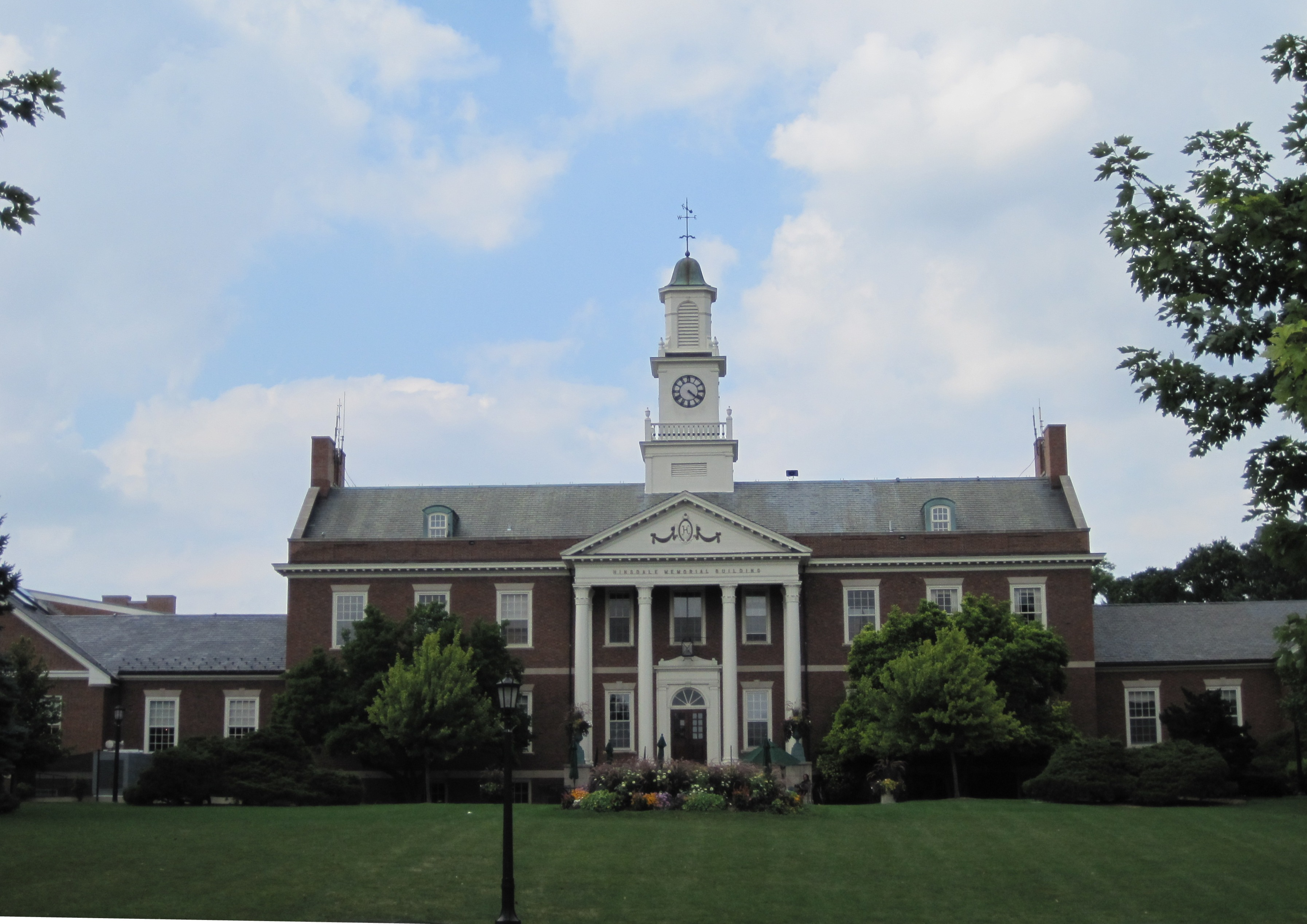
The Hinsdale Memorial Building, the Village Hall and public library in the Downtown Hinsdale Historic District

The village was incorporated on April 1, 1873. Law enforcement is provided by the Hinsdale Police Department. The Hinsdale Fire Department was established in 1893.

The community is served by the United States Postal Service Hinsdale Post Office.

== Infrastructure ==
=== Transportation ===
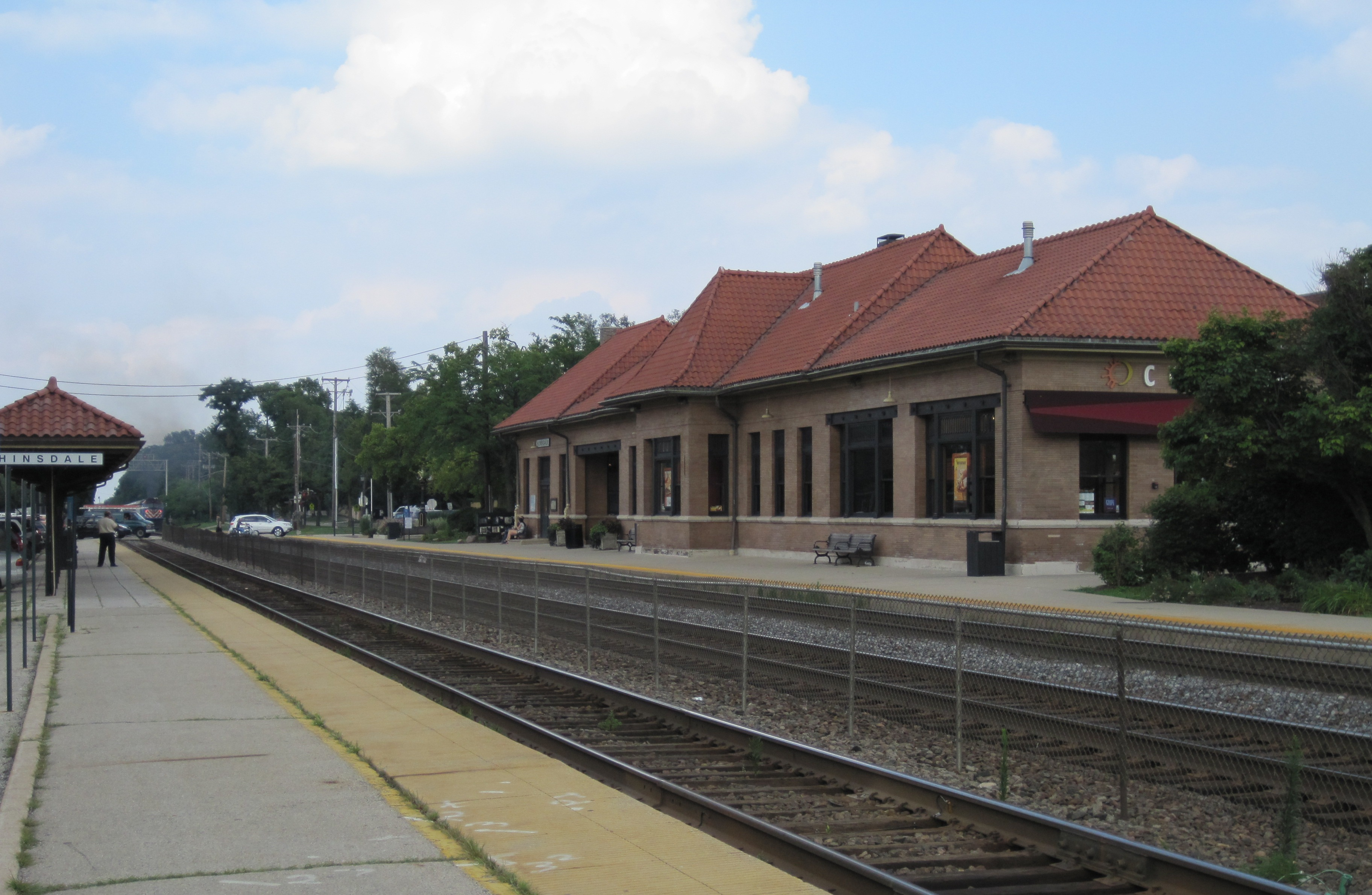
The Hinsdale train station on the BNSF Line

Hinsdale is served by a network of major federal, state, and county roads, including the Tri-State Tollway (Interstate 294), U.S. Route 34 and Illinois Route 83. Including by Metra's BNSF Line at three stations: Highlands, Hinsdale, and West Hinsdale. Additionally, Pace operates connecting bus services. Pace bus lines 663 and 668 serve Hinsdale.

=== Health care ===
UChicago Medicine AdventHealth Hinsdale hospital, operated by AdventHealth, founded in 1904, is a level-two trauma center and DuPage County's only teaching hospital. It has been ranked among the 100 best hospitals in the country.

== Education ==
=== Primary and secondary schools ===
Community Consolidated School District 181 and the Hinsdale Township High School District 86 serve Hinsdale's youth. The high school district has its headquarters in Hinsdale.

The School District 181 elementary schools within Hinsdale include The Lane School, Madison School, Monroe School, and Oak School. Elementary schools in District 181 that are not in Hinsdale include Prospect School, Elm School, and Walker School. Hinsdale Middle School, operated by the elementary school district, is in Hinsdale. Clarendon Hills Middle School, which also is in District 181, is in Clarendon Hills. St Isaac Jogues is a K-8 Catholic Grade School also located in Hinsdale.

Hinsdale Central High School (formerly Hinsdale Township High School) is in Hinsdale.

=== Public library ===
The Hinsdale Public Library is in the west wing of the Memorial Building. It opened in 1893. The Memorial Building, the library's first permanent residence, was completed in 1929. D. K. Pearson, a director of the library association, donated his house and a portion of his estate to the library system; the donation funded a 1957 addition to the library.

In 1988, the Memorial Building received an addition on the west side, and the library and the village administration swapped places.

== Economy ==
While many Hinsdale residents commute to jobs throughout the Chicago metropolitan area, Hinsdale is also the home of many small and medium-sized businesses.

Nonprofit organizations such as Hinsdale Historical Society and Hinsdale Humane Society are also based there.

=== Top employers ===
According to Hinsdale's 2020 Comprehensive Annual Financial Report, the top employers in the city are:

#	Employer	# of Employees
1	UChicago Medicine AdventHealth Hinsdale Hospital	1,555
2	RML Specialty Hospital	800
3	Hinsdale Township High School District 86	620
4	Community Consolidated School District 181	550
5	CWT	220
6	Coldwell Banker	150

== Parks and recreation ==
The Katherine Legge Memorial Park and Lodge, on 52 acres (21 ha) of woodland, was donated to the Village of Hinsdale in 1973. The lodge, built in 1927, may be rented for private and corporate events such as banquets, meetings, parties, picnics, receptions, and weddings. The park has a clubhouse with meeting rooms, a football/soccer field, a picnic area, playground apparatus, a scenic open space, a shelter, a frisbee golf course, a sledding hill, and four platform tennis courts.

The 3-acre (1.2 ha) Hinsdale Community Swimming Pool is Hinsdale's public pool. The 14.7-acre (5.9 ha) Veeck Park is Hinsdale's skate park and contains a baseball field, 4 soccer/football fields, a playground, an awning for shelter in case it rains, and a sandbox by the playground. The 8.3-acre (3.4 ha) Brook Park has a ball field, a football/soccer field, a playground apparatus, and four tennis courts. The 6.55-acre (2.65 ha) Burns Field has ice skating, a covered picnic area, a playground, bathrooms/warming house, six tennis courts, 2 platform tennis courts, a sand volleyball court, and a basketball court. The 8.82-acre (3.57 ha) Pierce Park has a ball field, a football/soccer field, a picnic area, a playground apparatus, a shelter, and two tennis courts. The 14.50-acre (5.87 ha) Robbins Park has a football/soccer field, a playground apparatus, and two tennis courts. The 2.33-acre (0.94 ha) Stough Park has ice skating, a playground apparatus, and two tennis courts.

The 4.04-acre (1.63 ha) Brush Hill Area has scenic open space and a sledding hill. The 1.8-acre (0.73 ha) Burlington Park has scenic open space. The 1.03-acre (0.42 ha) Dietz Park has a playground apparatus. The .91-acre (0.37 ha) Ehret Park has a shelter and scenic open space. The .98-acre (0.40 ha) Eleanor's Park has scenic open space. The 4.02-acre (1.63 ha) Highland Park has scenic open space. The 2.82-acre (1.14 ha) Melin Park has a playground apparatus. The 4.36-acre (1.76 ha) Memorial Building Grounds has scenic open space. The 2.33-acre (0.94 ha) Stough Park has scenic open space. The .89-acre (0.36 ha) Washington Circle has scenic open space. The 1.1-acre (0.45 ha) Woodland Park has scenic open space.
