= Downtown Hinsdale Historic District =

Historic district in Illinois, United States

- U.S. National Register of Historic Places
- U.S. Historic district
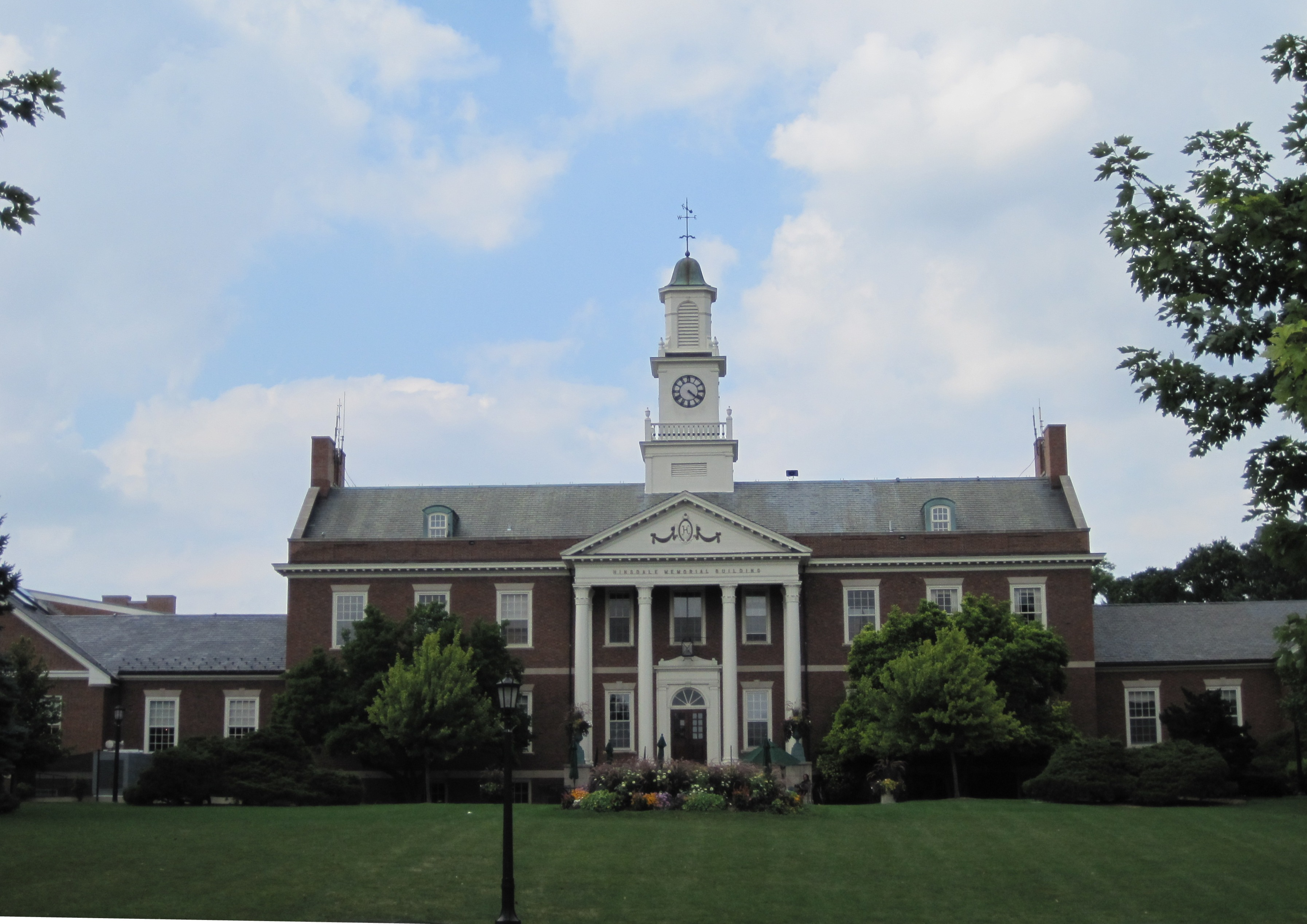
- The Hinsdale Memorial Building, the village hall and public library.

- Location within Illinois Location within the United States
- Location: Roughly Bounded by Maple St., Lincoln St., Garfield St. and Second St. Hinsdale, DuPage County, Illinois, U.S.
- Coordinates: 41°48′9.14″N 87°55′45.4″W
- Architectural style: Late Victorian, Italianate, Queen Anne, Late 19th and 20th Century Revivals, Colonial Revival, Renaissance Revival, Commercial Style, Art Deco, Modern, Late 19th and 20th Century American Movements
- NRHP reference No.: 06000011
- Added to NRHP: May 30, 2006

The Downtown Hinsdale Historic District is a set of seventy-three buildings and one park in Hinsdale, Illinois.

== History ==
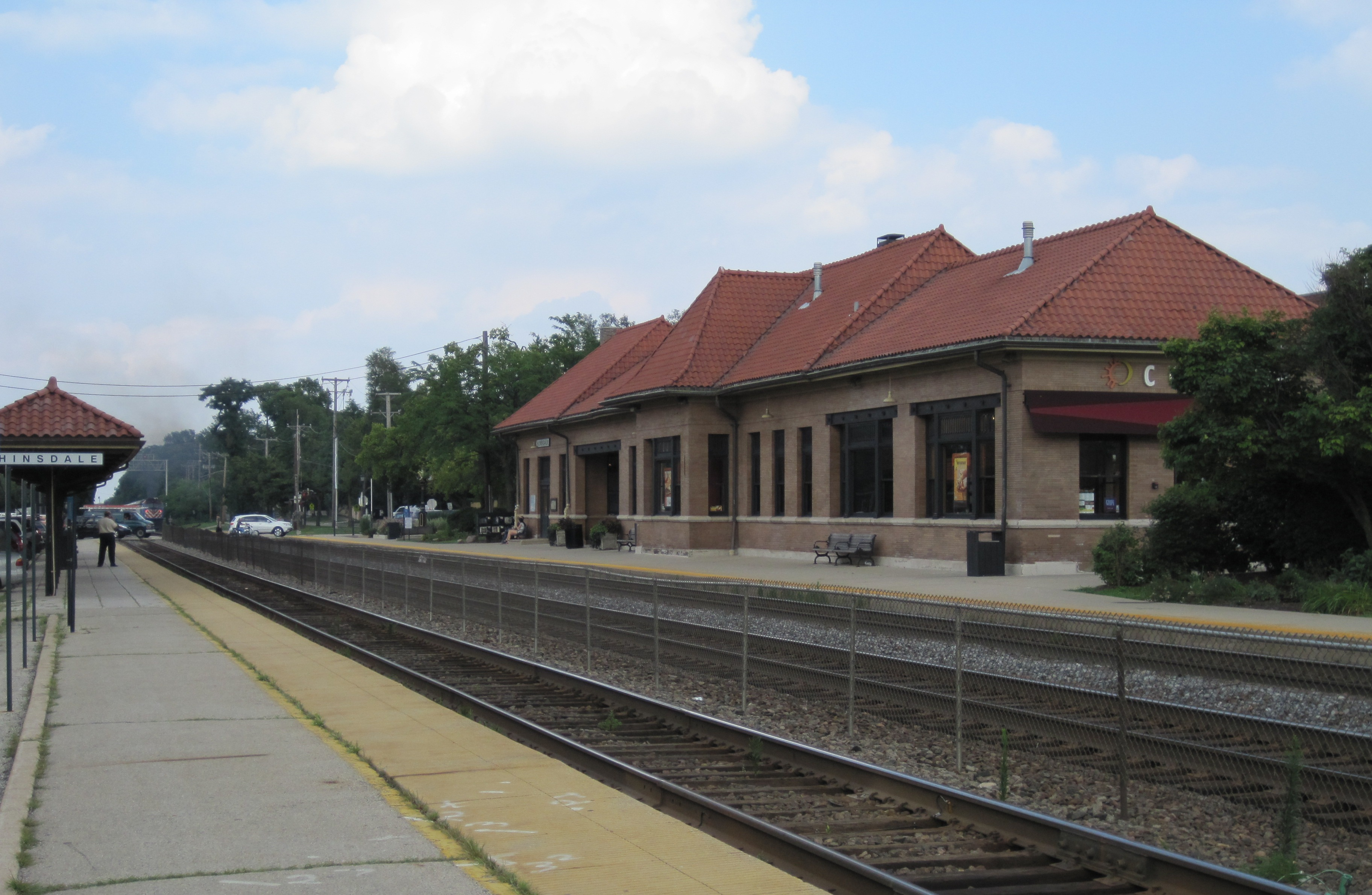
The Renaissance Revival style Hinsdale train station.

The region was platted by William Robbins, the founder of Hinsdale, in 1865. The Chicago, Burlington and Quincy Railroad's (CB&Q) passenger station prompted several small businesses to develop across the street. Fifty-eight of the listed buildings were built for commerce, three for government, and nine for transportation. The remaining building is a theater. The shops are densely clustered in orthogonal patterns, and are mostly found on the south side of the railway tracks. The government buildings, including the Village Hall (Hinsdale Memorial Building) and U.S. Post Office are on the north side.

An article entitled "Hinsdale the Beautiful" in Campbell's Illustrated Journal prompted city officials to further beautify the city. The first major project was a state-of-the-art train station, which was designed by CB&Q architect Walter Theodore Krausch. The station became a model for the future construction of other stations on the line. The region north of the tracks became the next target, focusing on the Railroad Park (modern day Burlington Park). Commercial demand spiked in the early 20th century, even causing some gablefront residential buildings to be rezoned as commercial. The 1200-seat Hinsdale Theater was constructed in 1925 for $160,000. Chain retailers began to move into the downtown district starting in the 1920s, starting with a Loblaw food chain in 1929 (which was purchased in 1932 by the Jewel Tea Company). A Piggly Wiggly and a Walgreens also moved in during this period. In the 1920s, the city of Hinsdale overhead plans by a local car dealership to build the largest automobile garage "east of the Mississippi". To curb this plan, the city bought the proposed site and constructed a building dedicated to those who served and died in World War I. Construction on the Memorial Building finished in 1927.

Hinsdale is notorious for the aggressive teardown policies pursued by real estate agencies in its residential districts, but the commercial district has remain intact. The earliest buildings are on First and Washington Streets, which date from the 1880s and are in the Late Victorian, Italianate, and Queen Anne Styles. Colonial and Renaissance Revivals featured in early 20th century buildings until the Hinsdale Plan of 1923 dictated the use of Georgian Revival architecture. Eight of the properties were built after 1955. The district is served by three asphalt-paved parking lots.

== Buildings ==
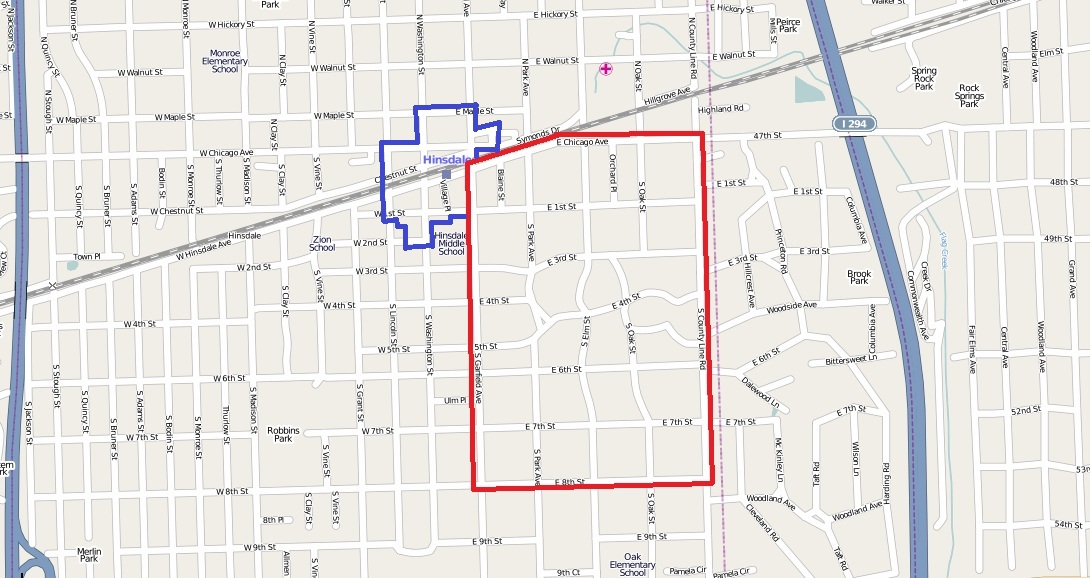
Location of Downtown Hinsdale Historic District (blue) within Hinsdale. The Robbins Park Historic District is in red.

=== Contributing structures ===
These buildings are at least fifty years old and have had minimal alterations. They comprise the main core of the historic district.

- Hinsdale Memorial Building (1927) - Georgian Revival Style Village Hall and public library designed by Edwin H. Clark
- Railroad Park (1877) - A public park adjacent to the Hinsdale Memorial Building
- 8 W. Chicago Ave. (c. 1950) - Colonial Revival gas station
- 10 W. Chicago Ave. (1926) - Classical Revival commercial block
- 24 W. Chicago Ave. (1915) - Garage
- 26-28 W. Chicago Ave. (c. 1940) - Modern Style commercial block
- Schweider & Mewherter Building (1944) - Classical Revival commercial block designed by R. Harold Zook
- 9 E. First St. (1904) - Colonial Revival commercial block
- 10-12 E. First St. (c. 1912) - Commercial Style commercial block
- Ostrum Building (1925) - Renaissance Revival style commercial block
- 212-214 First Street Building (c. 1912) - Commercial block
- Police and Fire Station (1935) - Georgian Revival police and fire station designed by Philip Duke West
- Hinsdale Theater (1925) - Renaissance Revival movie theater designed by William Gibson Barfield
- Philip D. West Office (1950) - International Style commercial block designed by Philip D. West
- Ray J. Soukup Building (1929) - Renaissance Revival style commercial block
- Henry Reineke Building (1922) - Commercial block
- Papenhausen Building (1888) - Gablefront commercial block
- Buchholz Block (1895) - Renaissance Revival commercial block
- John Reineke Building/The Squire Shop (1941) - Classical Revival commercial block designed by R. Harold Zook
- 17 W. First St. (1887) - Gablefront commercial block
- 19 W. First St. (1887) - Gablefront commercial block
- Brewer Brothers Filling Station (1929) - Colonial Revival gas station designed by R. Harold Zook
- Hinsdale Trust and Savings Bank (1910) - Classical Revival temple-front
- Dieke Building (1920) - Commercial block
- LaGrange Gas Company (c. 1940) - Art Deco commercial block
- 16 E. Hinsdale Ave. (1890) - Gablefront commercial block
- 18 Edward F. Neidig Building (1907) - Prairie School commercial block
- Brush Hill Train Station (1898) - Renaissance Revival style railroad station designed by Walter Theodore Krausch
- Mohr Building (1909) - Commercial style commercial block
- Clineff's Home Restaurant Building (1928–30) - Classical & Renaissance Revival style commercial block designed by Francis A. Flaks
- 32-34 E. Hinsdale Ave. (1912) - Commercial Style commercial block
- 36 E. Hinsdale Ave. (1924) - Commercial block
- 8 W. Hinsdale Ave. (c. 1927) - Colonial Revival commercial block
- Old Post Office (1926) - Colonial Revival commercial block
- 18 W. Hinsdale Ave. (c. 1902) - Commercial block
- 20 W. Hinsdale Ave. (1894) - Commercial block
- Fleck Automobile Building - Commercial Style commercial block
- McClintock Building/Auto Dealership (1922) Commercial block
- 53 S. Lincoln St. (1935) - Colonial Revival freestanding commercial building
- United States Post Office Hinsdale, IL (1939–40) - Georgian Revival United States Post Office designed by Louis A. Simon
- 33-35 S. Washington St. (1900) - Queen Anne and Classical Style commercial block
- Fox Building (1891) - Colonial Revival commercial block
- 39 S. Washington St. (1897) - Queen Anne commercial block
- William Evernden Building (1894) - Commercial block
- 41 S. Washington St. (1932) - Commercial style commercial block
- John Bohlander Building (1894) - Commercial block
- 43 S. Washington St. (1901) - Commercial style commercial block
- Olson's Dry Goods (1909) - Colonial Revival commercial block
- 46 S. Washington St. (1912) - Commercial block
- 47 S. Washington St. (1881) - Italianate and Colonial Revival commercial block
- Oswald Building (1889) - Colonial Revival commercial block, 1928 remodel designed by R. Harold Zook
- Karlson's Building (1898) - Commercial style
- 53 S. Washington St. (1927) - Classical Revival commercial block
- 54 S. Washington St. (1892) - Queen Anne commercial block
- Hinsdale State Bank (1927) - Classical and Renaissance Revival commercial block designed by William Gibson Barfield

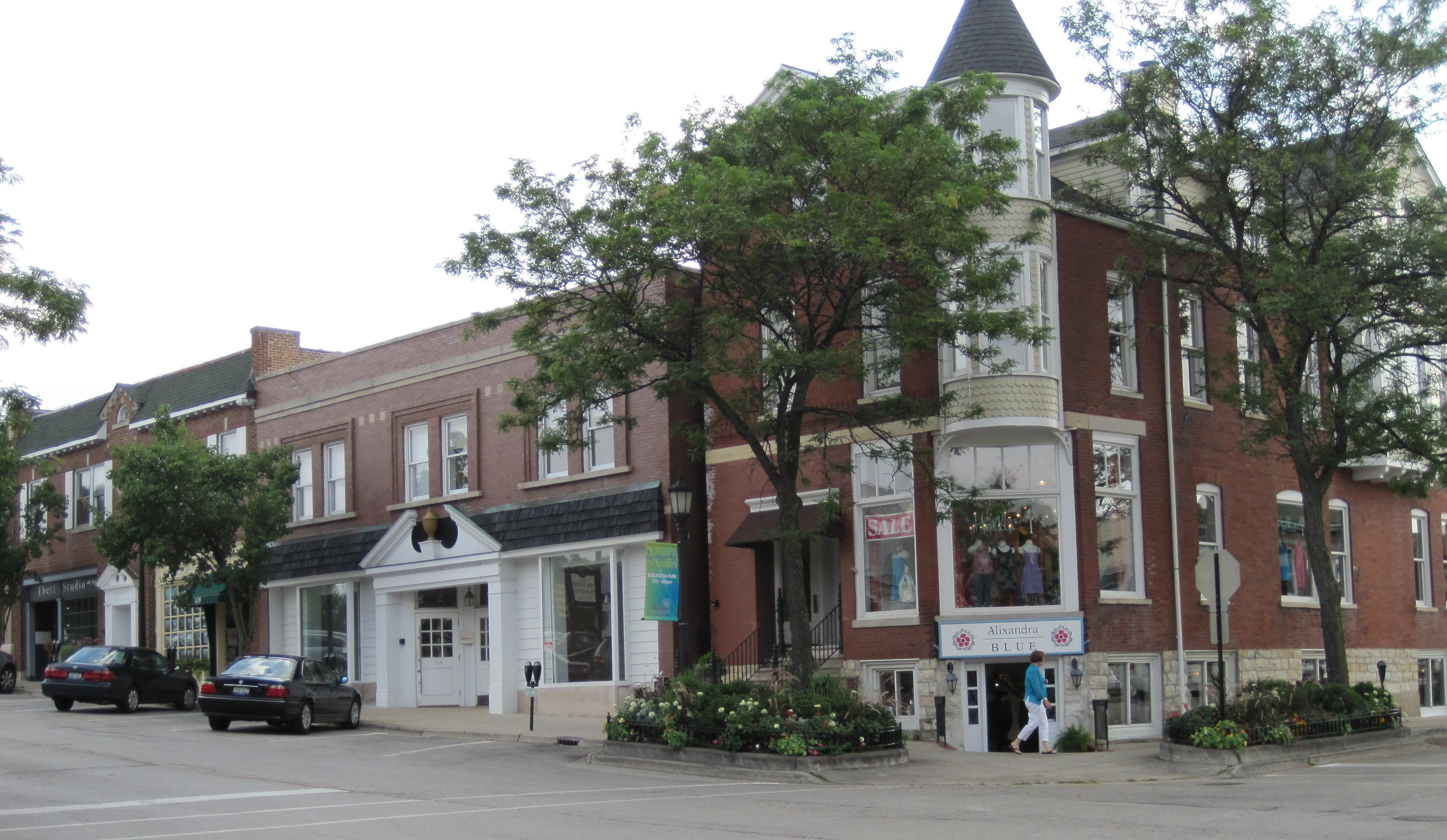
The 100 block of S. Washington. The Papenhausen building on is the far right.

- Papenhausen Building (1888) - Queen Anne commercial block
- 104-106 S. Washington St. (1910) - Commercial block
- Theidel Building (1925) - Renaissance Revival commercial block
- 112-114 S. Washington St. (1929) - Tudor Revival commercial block designed by Edward P. Steinberg
- 116-118 S. Washington St. (1915) - Commercial block

=== Non-contributing structures ===
These buildings are included as part of the listing, but are not of historical significance.

- John C. F. Merrill Building (1910) - Commercial block
- Hinsdale Chamber of Commerce (1978) - Commercial block designed by Philip Duke West
- Hinsdale Laundry Building (1894) - Gablefront commercial block
- Riccardo's Tailor Shop (1972) - Colonial Revival commercial block designed by Albert Nemoede
- Western United Gas and Electric Company (1909) - Temple-front
- 26-26.5 E. Hinsdale Ave. (1957) - Commercial block
- 40 E. Hinsdale Ave. (1998) - Neo-traditional commercial block
- 13 S. Lincoln St. (c. 1920) - Commercial block
- 40-46 Village Ct. (1908, 1960s) - Colonial Revival strip mall
- 45 S. Washington St. (1993) - Commercial block
- 48 S. Washington St. (1914/1919) - Commercial block
- 50 S. Washington St. (1988) - Commercial block
- 120 S. Washington St. (1965) - Colonial Revival commercial block

== See also ==
- Robbins Park Historic District, also platted by William Robbins
