= Highlands station =

Commuter rail station in Hinsdale, Illinois

Highlands

General information
- Location: 1/4 mile north of the Intersection of County Line Road & 47th Street; Hinsdale, Illinois
- Coordinates: 41.8051°N 87.9183°W
- Owner: Metra
- Line: BNSF Chicago Subdivision
- Platforms: 2 side platforms
- Tracks: 3

Construction
- Parking: Yes
- Accessible: Yes

Other information
- Fare zone: 3

History
- Opened: 1880
- Rebuilt: 2010

Passengers
- 2018: 202 (average weekday) ▼0.5%
- Rank: 163 out of 236

Services
Preceding station	Metra	Following station
Hinsdale toward Aurora	BNSF	Western Springs toward Union Station
Former services
Preceding station	Burlington Route	Following station
Hinsdale toward Aurora	Suburban Service	Western Springs toward Chicago
Track layout
Location

Highlands station is one of three commuter railroad stations along Metra's BNSF Line in Hinsdale, Illinois. The station is 16.3 miles (26.2 km) from Union Station, the east end of the line. As of 2018, Highlands is the 163rd busiest of Metra's 236 non-downtown stations, with an average of 202 weekday boardings. While Metra give the address as "1/4 mile north of the Intersection of County Line Road & 47th Street," it is actually opposite the corner of County Line Road and Highland Road. Parking is available at the station, as well as across the tracks on the south side of Hillgrove Avenue between Oak Street and County Line Road.

The station is a small stone-faced structure used only during rush hour and is near UChicago Medicine AdventHealth Hinsdale hospital, and three local parks, Highland Park, Veeck Park, and Pierce Park. There are no connections to buses at this stop.

As of September 8, 2025, Highlands is served by 26 trains (13 in each direction) on weekdays.
