= List of Metra stations =

Metra is the commuter rail system serving the Chicago metropolitan area in the U.S. states of Illinois and Wisconsin, servicing Cook, DuPage, Kane, Lake, McHenry, and Will Counties in northeastern Illinois and the city of Kenosha in southeastern Wisconsin. It is one of three of the Regional Transportation Authority's service boards. With an average weekday ridership of 294,600 in 2015, Metra is the fourth-busiest commuter rail system in the United States, only behind New York City metropolitan area systems. The Metra system has a total of 243 active stations spread out on 11 rail lines with 487.5 miles (784.6 km) of tracks. As of May 2024, an infill station, Auburn Park, is currently under construction on the Rock Island District. The newest Metra station, in the Edgewater neighborhood of Chicago, opened on May 20, 2024.

In 1974, the Regional Transit Authority (RTA) was created to provide stability in the commuter rail system, as most private commuter companies in the area were beginning to fail. In 1984, RTA created the Commuter Rail Service Board to help with planning an organized commuter rail system in the Chicago area. The board was renamed Metra in 1985. Through the creation of the Northeast Illinois Regional Commuter Railroad Corporation (NIRC), Metra's operating subsidiary and contracts with freight companies, Metra was able to open a network of commuter rail lines across the region. The system's newest line, the North Central Service, opened on August 19, 1996.

Ten of the system's eleven lines are owned or operated by the NIRC. Operation of the BNSF Line is handled through a purchase of service agreement (PSA) between Metra and the BNSF Railway. Under this agreement, the railroad company provides the service using its own employees and owns & controls the rights-of-way in addition to the majority of other facilities necessary, while Metra provides the rolling stock. Additionally, Metra funds the portion of South Shore Line within Illinois because it shares tracks with the Metra Electric District. Metra also operates Hegewisch station, although no Metra trains serve the station.

The development of Chicago's commuter rail network resulted in a spoke–hub distribution paradigm, and Metra's services radiate from four terminal stations in the Chicago Loop: Ogilvie Transportation Center, Union Station, LaSalle Street Station, and Millennium Station. However, all are within a 1.2-mile (1.9 km) radius of each other and easily accessible from one another, either by walking, cycling, driving, or the use of public transport.

== Key ==
| Station | The official name for the station |
| Lines | The line(s) that stop at the station |
| Rail connections | Any rail connections that can be made from the station |
| Location | The municipality or Chicago neighborhood in which the station is located |
| Fare zone | Identifies which of the four fare zones the station is in. The zones are numbered, with Zone 1 consisting of downtown Chicago. |
| † | A terminal station |
| Handicapped/disabled access | Fully-accessible station |
| Handicapped/disabled access | Partially-accessible station (Note: At partially accessible stations, customers using mobility devices can access and use trains; however, the stations may not have other accessibility features (such as accessible bathrooms, Braille signage, visual display announcements).) |

== Lines ==
Metra commuter rail lines
| Line | Symbol | Stations | Inbound terminus | Outbound terminus |
|---|---|---|---|---|
| BNSF | BNSF | 26 | Union Station | Aurora |
| Heritage Corridor | HC | 7 | Union Station | Joliet |
| Metra Electric | ME | 49 | Millennium Station | University Park |
| Metra Electric | ME-BI | 49 | Millennium Station | Blue Island |
| Metra Electric | ME-SC | 49 | Millennium Station | 93rd Street |
| Milwaukee District North | MDN | 22 | Union Station | Fox Lake |
| Milwaukee District West | MDW | 22 | Union Station | Big Timber Road |
| North Central Service | NCS | 18 | Union Station | Antioch |
| Rock Island | RI | 26 | LaSalle Street Station | Joliet |
| Rock Island | RI-Bev | 26 | LaSalle Street Station | Blue Island/Vermont Street |
| SouthWest Service | SWS | 13 | Union Station | Manhattan |
| Union Pacific North | UPN | 28 | Ogilvie (OTC) | Kenosha |
| Union Pacific Northwest | UPNW | 23 | Ogilvie (OTC) | Harvard, McHenry |
| Union Pacific West | UPW | 19 | Ogilvie (OTC) | Elburn |

== Stations ==
| Station | Lines | Major connections | Location | Fare zone |
|---|---|---|---|---|
| 18th Street | ME ME-BI ME-SC | —N/a | Near South Side, Chicago | 2 |
| 27th Street | ME ME-BI ME-SC | —N/a | Douglas, Chicago | 2 |
| 35th Street | RI RI-Bev | CTA: Red (at Sox–35th) Green (at 35th–Bronzeville–IIT) | Bronzeville, Chicago | 2 |
| 47th Street/Kenwood | ME ME-BI ME-SC | —N/a | Kenwood, Chicago | 2 |
| 51st/53rd Street/Hyde Park | ME ME-BI ME-SC | —N/a | Hyde Park, Chicago | 2 |
| 55th/56th/57th Street | ME ME-BI ME-SC | South Shore Line: | Jackson Park, Chicago | 2 |
| 59th/60th Street/University of Chicago | ME ME-BI ME-SC | —N/a | University of Chicago | 2 |
| 63rd Street | ME ME-BI ME-SC | South Shore Line: | Woodlawn, Chicago | 2 |
| 75th Street/Grand Crossing | ME ME-BI | —N/a | Grand Crossing, Chicago | 2 |
| 75th Street/Windsor Park | ME-SC | —N/a | South Shore, Chicago | 2 |
| 79th Street/Chatham | ME ME-BI | —N/a | Chatham, Chicago | 2 |
| 79th Street/Cheltenham | ME-SC | —N/a | South Shore, Chicago | 2 |
| 80th Avenue/Tinley Park | RI | —N/a | Tinley Park | 4 |
| 83rd Street/Avalon Park | ME ME-BI | —N/a | Avalon Park, Chicago | 2 |
| 83rd Street/South Chicago | ME-SC | —N/a | South Chicago, Chicago | 2 |
| 87th Street/Woodruff | ME ME-BI | —N/a | Chesterfield, Chicago | 2 |
| 87th Street/South Chicago | ME-SC | —N/a | South Chicago, Chicago | 2 |
| 91st Street/Beverly Hills | RI-Bev | —N/a | Beverly, Chicago | 2 |
| 91st Street/Chesterfield | ME ME-BI | —N/a | Burnside, Chicago | 2 |
| 93rd Street/South Chicago † | ME-SC | —N/a | South Chicago, Chicago | 2 |
| 95th Street/Beverly Hills | RI-Bev | —N/a | Beverly, Chicago | 2 |
| 95th Street/Longwood | RI | —N/a | Longwood Manor, Chicago | 2 |
| 95th Street/Chicago State University | ME ME-BI | —N/a | Roseland, Chicago | 2 |
| 99th Street/Beverly Hills | RI-Bev | —N/a | Beverly, Chicago | 2 |
| 103rd Street/Rosemoor | ME ME-BI | —N/a | Rosemoor, Chicago | 2 |
| 103rd Street/Beverly Hills | RI-Bev | —N/a | Beverly, Chicago | 2 |
| 103rd Street/Washington Heights | RI | —N/a | Washington Heights, Chicago | 2 |
| 107th Street | ME ME-BI | —N/a | Pullman, Chicago | 2 |
| 107th Street/Beverly Hills | RI-Bev | —N/a | Beverly, Chicago | 2 |
| 111th Street/Pullman | ME ME-BI | —N/a | Pullman, Chicago | 2 |
| 111th Street/Morgan Park | RI-Bev | —N/a | Morgan Park, Chicago | 2 |
| 115th Street/Kensington | ME ME-BI | —N/a | Kensington, Chicago | 2 |
| 115th Street/Morgan Park | RI-Bev | —N/a | Morgan Park, Chicago | 2 |
| 119th Street | RI-Bev | —N/a | Blue Island | 2 |
| 123rd Street | RI-Bev | —N/a | Blue Island | 2 |
| 143rd Street/Orland Park | SWS | —N/a | Orland Park | 4 |
| 147th Street/Sibley | ME | —N/a | Harvey | 2 |
| 153rd Street/Orland Park | SWS | —N/a | Orland Park | 4 |
| 179th Street/Orland Park | SWS | —N/a | Orland Park | 4 |
| 211th Street/Lincoln Highway | ME | —N/a | Park Forest | 3 |
| Antioch † | NCS | —N/a | Antioch | 4 |
| Arlington Heights | UPNW | —N/a | Arlington Heights | 3 |
| Arlington Park | UPNW | —N/a | Arlington Heights | 3 |
| Ashburn | SWS | —N/a | Ashburn, Chicago | 2 |
| Ashland/Calumet Park | ME-BI | —N/a | Calumet Park | 2 |
| Aurora † | BNSF | —N/a | Aurora | 4 |
| Barrington | UPNW | —N/a | Barrington | 4 |
| Bartlett | MDW | —N/a | Bartlett | 4 |
| Bellwood | UPW | —N/a | Bellwood | 2 |
| Belmont | BNSF | —N/a | Downers Grove | 4 |
| Belmont Avenue/Franklin Park | NCS | —N/a | Franklin Park | 2 |
| Bensenville | MDW | —N/a | Bensenville | 3 |
| Berkeley | UPW | —N/a | Berkeley | 2 |
| Berwyn | BNSF | —N/a | Berwyn | 2 |
| Big Timber Road/Elgin † | MDW | —N/a | Elgin | 4 |
| Blue Island † | ME-BI | Metra: RI RI-Bev | Blue Island | 2 |
| Blue Island/Vermont Street | RI RI-Bev | Metra: ME-BI | Blue Island | 2 |
| Braeside | UPN | —N/a | Highland Park | 3 |
| Brainerd | RI-Bev | —N/a | Brainerd, Chicago | 2 |
| Brookfield | BNSF | —N/a | Brookfield | 2 |
| Bryn Mawr | ME-SC | CTA: J14 | South Shore, Chicago | 2 |
| Buffalo Grove | NCS | —N/a | Buffalo Grove | 4 |
| Burr Oak | ME-BI | —N/a | Calumet Park | 2 |
| Calumet | ME | —N/a | East Hazel Crest | 2 |
| Cary | UPNW | —N/a | Cary | 4 |
| Central Street/Evanston | UPN | —N/a | Evanston | 2 |
| Chicago Ridge | SWS | —N/a | Chicago Ridge | 3 |
| Chicago Union Station † | MDN MDW NCS; BNSF HC SWS | Amtrak; CTA: Blue (at Clinton) Orange Purple Pink Brown (at Quincy) | West Loop, Chicago | 1 |
| Cicero | BNSF | —N/a | Cicero | 2 |
| Clarendon Hills | BNSF | —N/a | Clarendon Hills | 3 |
| Clybourn | UPN UPNW | —N/a | Bucktown, Chicago | 2 |
| College Avenue | UPW | —N/a | Wheaton | 4 |
| Congress Park | BNSF | —N/a | Brookfield | 3 |
| Crystal Lake | UPNW | —N/a | Crystal Lake | 4 |
| Cumberland | UPNW | —N/a | Des Plaines | 3 |
| Davis Street/Evanston | UPN | CTA: Purple (at Davis); Pace Pulse: ■ Dempster Line | Evanston | 2 |
| Dee Road | UPNW | —N/a | Park Ridge | 2 |
| Deerfield | MDN | —N/a | Deerfield | 4 |
| Des Plaines | UPNW | Pace Pulse: ■ Dempster Line | Des Plaines | 3 |
| Edgebrook | MDN | —N/a | Edgebrook, Chicago | 2 |
| Edison Park | UPNW | —N/a | Edison Park, Chicago | 2 |
| Elburn † | UPW | —N/a | Elburn | 4 |
| Elgin | MDW | —N/a | Elgin | 4 |
| Elmhurst | UPW | —N/a | Elmhurst | 3 |
| Elmwood Park | MDW | —N/a | Elmwood Park | 2 |
| Fairview Avenue/Downers Grove | BNSF | —N/a | Downers Grove | 3 |
| Flossmoor | ME | —N/a | Flossmoor | 3 |
| Forest Glen | MDN | —N/a | Forest Glen, Chicago | 2 |
| Fort Sheridan | UPN | —N/a | Highwood | 4 |
| Fox Lake † | MDN | —N/a | Fox Lake | 4 |
| Fox River Grove | UPNW | —N/a | Fox River Grove | 4 |
| Franklin Park | MDW | —N/a | Franklin Park | 2 |
| Galewood | MDW | —N/a | Galewood, Chicago | 2 |
| Geneva | UPW | —N/a | Geneva | 4 |
| Gladstone Park | UPNW | —N/a | Gladstone Park, Chicago | 2 |
| Glen Ellyn | UPW | —N/a | Glen Ellyn | 4 |
| Glencoe | UPN | —N/a | Glencoe | 3 |
| Glenview | MDN | Amtrak | Glenview | 3 |
| Golf | MDN | —N/a | Golf | 3 |
| Grand/Cicero | MDW | —N/a | Austin, Chicago | 2 |
| Grayland | MDN | —N/a | Grayland, Chicago | 2 |
| Grayslake | MDN | —N/a | Grayslake | 4 |
| Great Lakes | UPN | —N/a | North Chicago | 4 |
| Gresham | RI RI-Bev | —N/a | Auburn Gresham, Chicago | 2 |
| Halsted Street | BNSF | —N/a | University Village, Chicago | 2 |
| Hanover Park | MDW | —N/a | Hanover Park | 4 |
| Hanson Park | MDW | —N/a | Hanson Park, Chicago | 2 |
| Harlem Avenue | BNSF | —N/a | Berwyn | 2 |
| Harvard † | UPNW | —N/a | Harvard | 4 |
| Harvey | ME | —N/a | Harvey | 2 |
| Hazel Crest | ME | —N/a | Hazel Crest | 2 |
| Healy | MDN | —N/a | Logan Square, Chicago | 2 |
| Hegewisch | —N/a | South Shore Line: | Hegewisch, Chicago | 3 |
| Hickory Creek | RI | —N/a | Mokena | 4 |
| Highland Park | UPN | —N/a | Highland Park | 4 |
| Highlands | BNSF | —N/a | Hinsdale | 3 |
| Highwood | UPN | —N/a | Highwood | 4 |
| Hinsdale | BNSF | —N/a | Hinsdale | 3 |
| Hollywood | BNSF | —N/a | Brookfield | 2 |
| Homewood | ME | Amtrak | Homewood | 3 |
| Hubbard Woods | UPN | —N/a | Winnetka | 3 |
| Indian Hill | UPN | —N/a | Winnetka | 3 |
| Ingleside | MDN | —N/a | Ingleside | 4 |
| Irving Park | UPNW | CTA: Blue (at Irving Park) | Irving Park, Chicago | 2 |
| Itasca | MDW | —N/a | Itasca | 3 |
| Ivanhoe | ME | —N/a | Riverdale | 2 |
| Jefferson Park | UPNW | CTA: Blue; Pace Pulse: ■ Milwaukee Line | Jefferson Park, Chicago | 2 |
| Joliet † | RI HC | Amtrak | Joliet | 4 |
| Kedzie | UPW | —N/a | East Garfield Park, Chicago | 2 |
| Kenilworth | UPN | —N/a | Kenilworth | 3 |
| Kenosha † | UPN | Kenosha Streetcar | Kenosha, WI | 4 |
| La Fox | UPW | —N/a | La Fox | 4 |
| LaGrange Road | BNSF | Amtrak | La Grange | 3 |
| Lake Bluff | UPN | —N/a | Lake Bluff | 4 |
| Lake Cook Road | MDN | —N/a | Deerfield | 3 |
| Lake Forest | MDN | —N/a | Lake Forest | 4 |
| Lake Forest | UPN | —N/a | Lake Forest | 4 |
| Lake Villa | NCS | —N/a | Lake Villa | 4 |
| Laraway Road | SWS | —N/a | New Lenox | 4 |
| LaSalle Street Station † | RI RI-Bev | CTA: Blue (at LaSalle) Brown Orange Pink Purple (at LaSalle/Van Buren) | Loop, Chicago | 1 |
| LaVergne | BNSF | —N/a | Berwyn | 2 |
| Lemont | HC | —N/a | Lemont | 3 |
| Libertyville | MDN | —N/a | Libertyville | 4 |
| Lisle | BNSF | —N/a | Lisle | 4 |
| Lockport | HC | —N/a | Lockport | 4 |
| Lombard | UPW | —N/a | Lombard | 3 |
| Long Lake | MDN | —N/a | Long Lake | 4 |
| Main Street/Downers Grove | BNSF | —N/a | Downers Grove | 4 |
| Main Street/Evanston | UPN | CTA: Purple (at Main) | Evanston | 2 |
| Manhattan † | SWS | —N/a | Manhattan | 4 |
| Mannheim | MDW | —N/a | Franklin Park | 2 |
| Mars | MDW | —N/a | Mars, Chicago | 2 |
| Matteson | ME | —N/a | Matteson | 3 |
| Mayfair | MDN | CTA: Blue (at Montrose) | Portage Park, Chicago | 2 |
| Maywood | UPW | —N/a | Maywood | 2 |
| McCormick Place | ME ME-BI ME-SC | —N/a | McCormick Place, Chicago | 2 |
| McHenry † | UPNW | —N/a | McHenry | 4 |
| Medinah | MDW | —N/a | Medinah | 3 |
| Melrose Park | UPW | —N/a | Melrose Park | 2 |
| Midlothian | RI | —N/a | Midlothian | 2 |
| Millennium Station † | ME ME-BI ME-SC | South Shore Line: CTA: Brown Green Orange Pink Purple (at Washington/Wabash) | Millennium Park, Chicago | 1 |
| Mokena | RI | —N/a | Mokena | 4 |
| Mont Clare | MDW | —N/a | Montclare, Chicago | 2 |
| Morton Grove | MDN | —N/a | Morton Grove | 2 |
| Mount Prospect | UPNW | —N/a | Mount Prospect | 3 |
| Mundelein | NCS | —N/a | Mundelein | 4 |
| Museum Campus/11th Street | ME ME-BI ME-SC | South Shore Line: CTA: J14 | South Loop, Chicago | 1 |
| Naperville | BNSF | Amtrak | Naperville | 4 |
| National Street/Elgin | MDW | —N/a | Elgin | 4 |
| New Lenox | RI | —N/a | New Lenox | 4 |
| North Chicago | UPN | —N/a | North Chicago | 4 |
| Northbrook | MDN | —N/a | Northbrook | 3 |
| Norwood Park | UPNW | —N/a | Norwood Park, Chicago | 2 |
| O'Hare Transfer | NCS | ATS to O'Hare; Pace Pulse: ■ Dempster Line | O'Hare, Chicago | 2 |
| Oak Forest | RI | —N/a | Oak Forest | 3 |
| Oak Lawn Patriot | SWS | —N/a | Oak Lawn | 3 |
| Oak Park | UPW | CTA: Green (at Harlem/Lake) | Oak Park | 2 |
| Ogilvie Transportation Center † | UPN UPNW UPW | CTA: Green Pink (at Clinton), J14 | West Loop, Chicago | 1 |
| Olympia Fields | ME | —N/a | Olympia Fields | 3 |
| Palatine | UPNW | —N/a | Palatine | 4 |
| Palos Heights | SWS | —N/a | Palos Heights | 3 |
| Palos Park | SWS | —N/a | Palos Park | 4 |
| Park Ridge | UPNW | —N/a | Park Ridge | 2 |
| Peterson/Ridge | UPN | —N/a | Edgewater, Chicago | 2 |
| Pingree Road | UPNW | —N/a | Crystal Lake | 4 |
| Prairie Crossing | MDN | Metra: NCS | Libertyville | 4 |
| Prairie Crossing | NCS | Metra: MDN | Libertyville | 4 |
| Prairie Street | RI-Bev | —N/a | Blue Island | 2 |
| Prairie View | NCS | —N/a | Prairie View | 4 |
| Prospect Heights | NCS | —N/a | Prospect Heights | 3 |
| Racine Avenue | ME-BI | —N/a | West Pullman, Chicago | 2 |
| Ravenswood | UPN | CTA: Brown (at Damen) | Ravenswood, Chicago | 2 |
| Ravinia | UPN | —N/a | Highland Park | 3 |
| Ravinia Park (Seasonal) | UPN | —N/a | Highland Park | 3 |
| Richton Park | ME | —N/a | Richton Park | 3 |
| River Forest | UPW | —N/a | River Forest | 2 |
| River Grove | MDW NCS | —N/a | River Grove | 2 |
| Riverdale | ME | —N/a | Riverdale | 2 |
| Riverside | BNSF | —N/a | Riverside | 2 |
| Robbins | RI | —N/a | Robbins | 2 |
| Rogers Park | UPN | —N/a | Rogers Park, Chicago | 2 |
| Romeoville | HC | —N/a | Romeoville | 4 |
| Roselle | MDW | —N/a | Roselle | 4 |
| Rosemont | NCS | —N/a | Rosemont | 2 |
| Round Lake | MDN | —N/a | Round Lake | 4 |
| Round Lake Beach | NCS | —N/a | Round Lake Beach | 4 |
| Route 59 | BNSF | —N/a | Aurora | 4 |
| Schaumburg | MDW | —N/a | Schaumburg | 4 |
| Schiller Park | NCS | —N/a | Schiller Park | 2 |
| South Shore | ME-SC | —N/a | South Shore, Chicago | 2 |
| State Street | ME-BI | —N/a | West Pullman, Chicago | 2 |
| Stewart Ridge | ME-BI | —N/a | West Pullman, Chicago | 2 |
| Stone Avenue | BNSF | —N/a | La Grange | 3 |
| Stony Island | ME-SC | —N/a | South Shore, Chicago | 2 |
| Summit | HC | Amtrak | Summit | 2 |
| The Glen/North Glenview | MDN | —N/a | Glenview | 3 |
| Tinley Park | RI | —N/a | Tinley Park | 3 |
| University Park † | ME | —N/a | University Park | 3 |
| Van Buren Street | ME ME-BI ME-SC | South Shore Line: CTA: Brown Green Orange Pink Purple (at Adams/Wabash) Blue (at Jackson) Red (at Jackson), J14 | Loop, Chicago | 1 |
| Vernon Hills | NCS | —N/a | Vernon Hills | 4 |
| Villa Park | UPW | —N/a | Villa Park | 3 |
| Washington Street/Grayslake | NCS | —N/a | Grayslake | 4 |
| Waukegan | UPN | —N/a | Waukegan | 4 |
| West Chicago | UPW | —N/a | West Chicago | 4 |
| West Hinsdale | BNSF | —N/a | Hinsdale | 3 |
| West Pullman | ME-BI | —N/a | West Pullman, Chicago | 2 |
| Western Avenue | BNSF | CTA: Pink (at Western) | Lower West Side, Chicago | 2 |
| Western Avenue | MDN MDW NCS | —N/a | West Town, Chicago | 2 |
| Western Springs | BNSF | —N/a | Western Springs | 3 |
| Westmont | BNSF | —N/a | Westmont | 3 |
| Wheaton | UPW | —N/a | Wheaton | 4 |
| Wheeling | NCS | —N/a | Wheeling | 3 |
| Willow Springs | HC | —N/a | Willow Springs | 3 |
| Wilmette | UPN | —N/a | Wilmette | 2 |
| Winfield | UPW | —N/a | Winfield | 4 |
| Winnetka | UPN | —N/a | Winnetka | 3 |
| Winthrop Harbor | UPN | —N/a | Winthrop Harbor | 4 |
| Wood Dale | MDW | —N/a | Wood Dale | 3 |
| Woodstock | UPNW | —N/a | Woodstock | 4 |
| Worth | SWS | —N/a | Worth | 3 |
| Wrightwood | SWS | —N/a | Wrightwood, Chicago | 2 |
| Zion | UPN | —N/a | Zion | 4 |

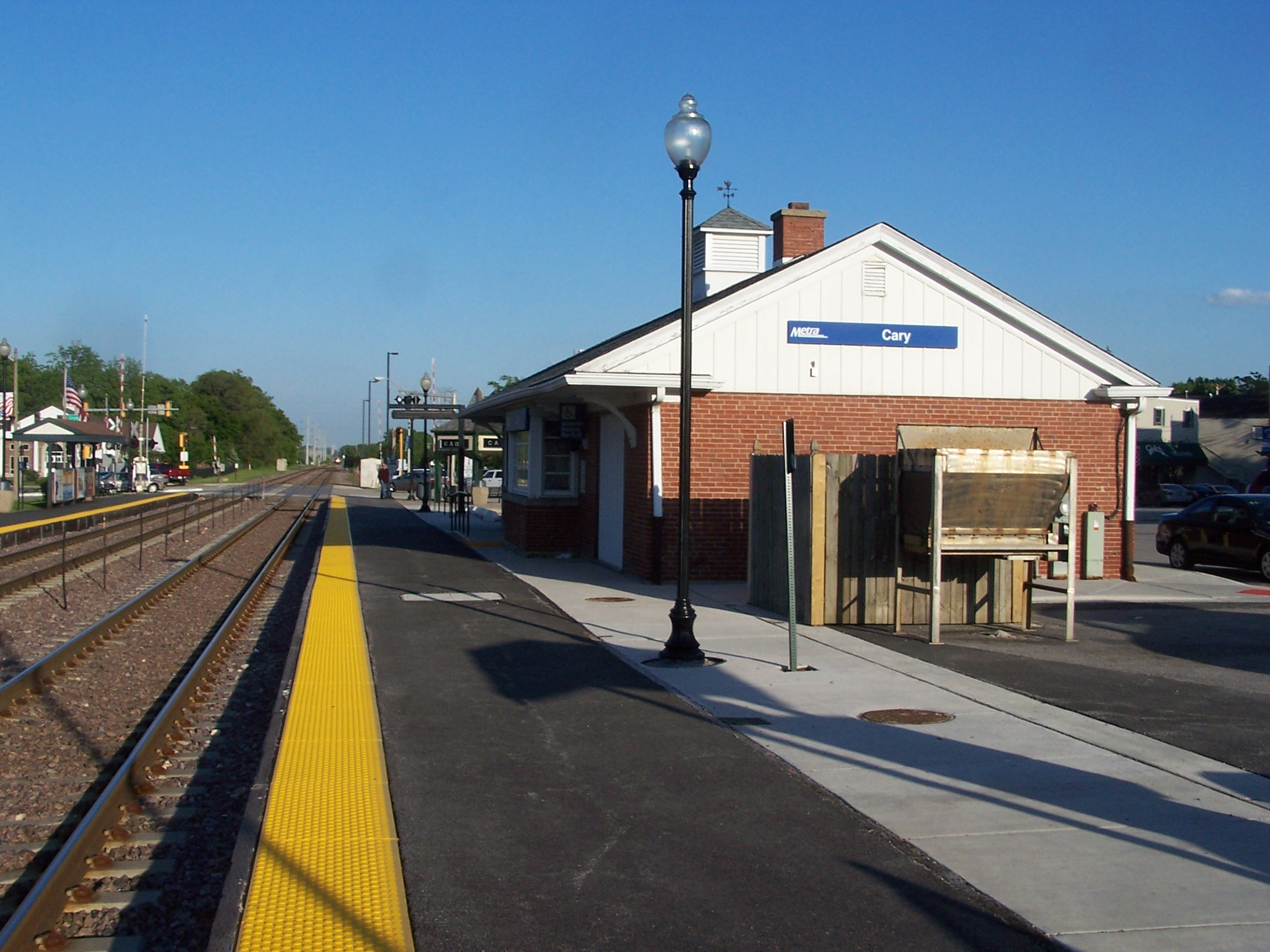
Cary station on the Union Pacific Northwest Line

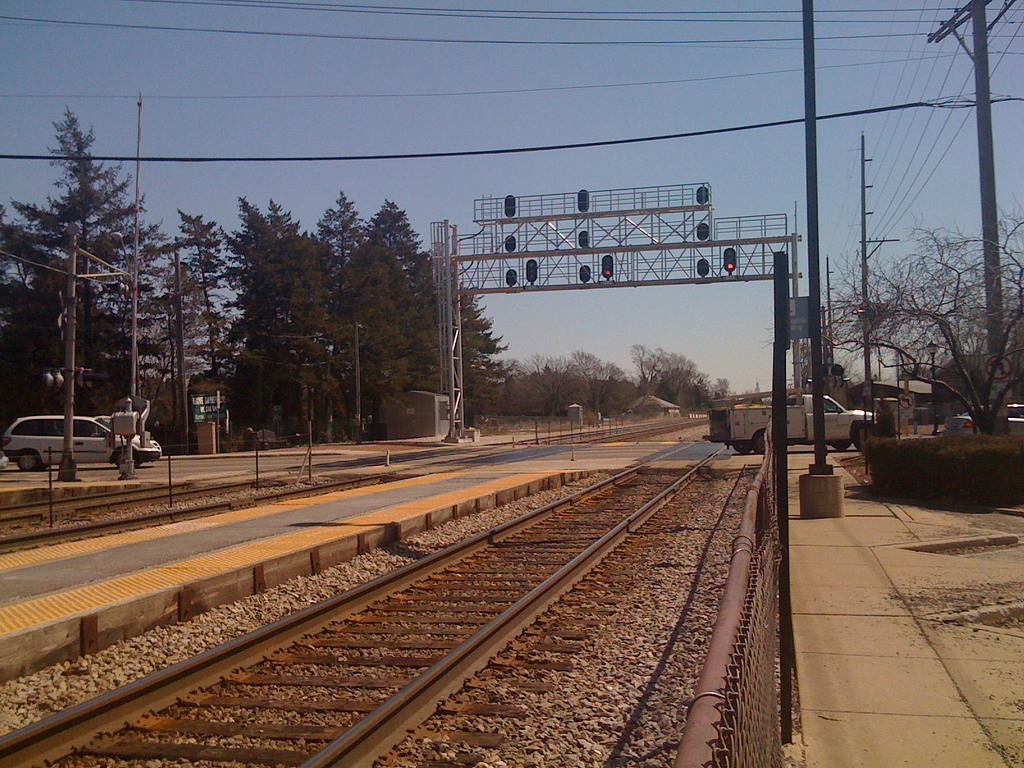
The platforms at River Grove station, which serves trains on both the North Central Service and the Milwaukee District West Line

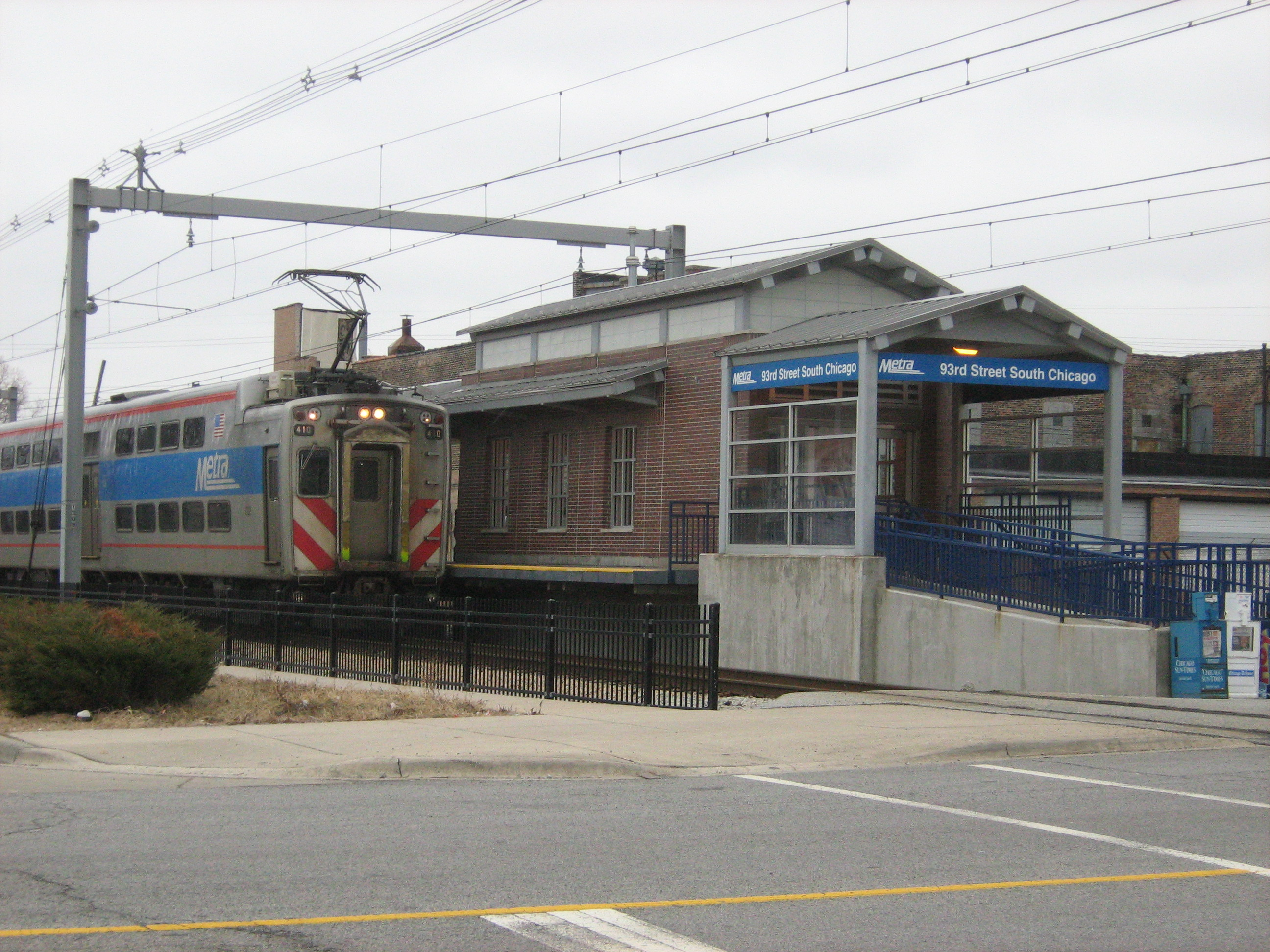
93rd Street/South Chicago station is the terminus for the South Chicago Branch on the Metra Electric District

== Future stations ==
| Station | Lines | Rail connections | Location | Fare zone | Status |
|---|---|---|---|---|---|
| Auburn Park | RI | —N/a | Auburn Gresham, Chicago | 2 | Under construction |
| Marengo | Unnamed intercity service | —N/a | Marengo | | Under construction |
| Belvidere | Unnamed intercity service | —N/a | Belvidere | | Under construction |
| Rockford † | Unnamed intercity service | —N/a | Rockford | | Under construction |
| Johnsburg † | UPNW | —N/a | Johnsburg | 4 | Proposed |
| Prairie Grove | UPNW | —N/a | Prairie Grove | 4 | Proposed |
| Ridgefield | UPNW | —N/a | Ridgefield | 4 | Proposed |
| Kinzie–Fulton Market | MDN MDW NCS UPW | CTA: Green Pink (at Ashland) | West Town, Chicago | 2 | Proposed |

== Former stations ==
| Station | Lines | Rail connections | Location | Fare zone | Closed | Notes |
|---|---|---|---|---|---|---|
| 5th Street | HC | —N/a | Lockport | G | 1988 | |
| 67th Street | ME | —N/a | Woodlawn, Chicago | B | 1984 | Station platforms still exist. |
| 91st Street/South Chicago † | ME | —N/a | South Chicago, Chicago | B | June 2001 | Replaced by 93rd Street/South Chicago. |
| 99th Street/Longwood | RI | —N/a | Longwood Manor, Chicago | C | 1985 | |
| Abbott's Platform | UPN | —N/a | North Chicago | G | 1986 | Station only listed on timetables as a note on some North Chicago stop times. |
| Brighton Park | HC | —N/a | Brighton Park, Chicago | C | 1984 | |
| Clyde | BNSF | —N/a | Cicero | B | 2007 | Closed due to low ridership and close proximity to Cicero. |
| Cragin | MDW | —N/a | Belmont Cragin, Chicago | B | 2007 | Closed along with Hermosa and replaced with Grand/Cicero. |
| Givens | RI | —N/a | Morgan Park, Chicago | C | 1984 | |
| Glenn | HC | —N/a | Central Stickney | C | 1989 | Closed due to low ridership and difficulty to access the station. |
| Halsted Street | HC | —N/a | Bridgeport, Chicago | B | 1984 | |
| Hartland | UPNW | —N/a | Hartland | L | 1984 | |
| Hermosa | MDW | —N/a | Hermosa, Chicago | B | 2007 | Closed along with Cragin and replaced with Grand/Cicero. |
| Joliet Union Station † | RI HC | Amtrak | Joliet | H | 2014 | Replaced by Joliet Gateway Center in 2018. |
| Rondout | MDN | —N/a | Rondout | G | 1984 | |
| Western Avenue | SWS | —N/a | Ashburn, Chicago | B | May 1984 | |
| Wilson Road | MDN | —N/a | Long Lake | J | 1984 | |
