= Aurora Subdivision =

Railway line in Wisconsin and Illinois

The Aurora Subdivision or Aurora Sub is a railway line in Wisconsin and Illinois operated by BNSF Railway. It is part of BNSF's Chicago, Illinois, to Seattle, Washington, Northern Transcon. This segment runs about 262 miles (422 km) from the St. Croix Subdivision in La Crosse, Wisconsin, to the Chicago Subdivision in Aurora, Illinois.

The original line created by the Chicago, Burlington and Quincy Railroad ran out of Aurora, Illinois to Oregon, Illinois. In 1885, the line was continued from Oregon to connect to St. Paul, Minnesota. From then on, this track hosted some of the fastest trains in the world for the time period, including the Chicago, Burlington and Quincy Railroad's Twin Cities Zephyr. The Northern Pacific North Coast Limited and Great Northern Empire Builder also ran to Minneapolis–Saint Paul and on to the west coast on this track. However, with the advent of Amtrak in 1971, the Empire Builder changed its route between Chicago and the Twin Cities to run on the route of the former Milwaukee Road Hiawatha instead.

Today, there is no regular passenger service on the line. However, the line does host occasional passenger trains in the form of excursions or for reroutes of the Empire Builder when necessary. The main freight is intermodal traffic and some freight traffic. Amtrak trains heading westward along the Chicago Subdivision immediately turn southwest toward Galesburg, Illinois, along the Mendota Subdivision as they pass through Aurora, but they currently (as of 2010) do not stop in the city. Metra commuter rail service to Chicago via the BNSF Line terminates at the Aurora Transportation Center, but this is at the end of a spur parallel to the main line. There was an old train station on Broadway (Route 25) about a mile south of the Aurora Transportation Center, but it was demolished in 2013, following damage from a thunderstorm.

The Aurora Subdivision is mostly single track with sidings between Aurora to Plum River, south of Savanna, with the exception of double track from Steward through Rochelle to Flagg Center. At Plum River, it is double track up until it crosses the Wisconsin River near Wyalusing State Park in Wisconsin, where it becomes single track again. The single track continues for a short distance until Crawford, south of Prairie du Chien, where it once again becomes double track to Grand Crossing, where the line becomes the St. Croix Subdivision.

In La Crosse, the branch at Herrington had continued North and West to the Downtown La Crosse Station. It then headed Northeast to re-join the main at a point north of Grand Crossing where the North La Crosse depot still stands today.
