= Main Street/Downers Grove station =

Commuter rail station in Downers Grove, Illinois

Main St./Downers Grove

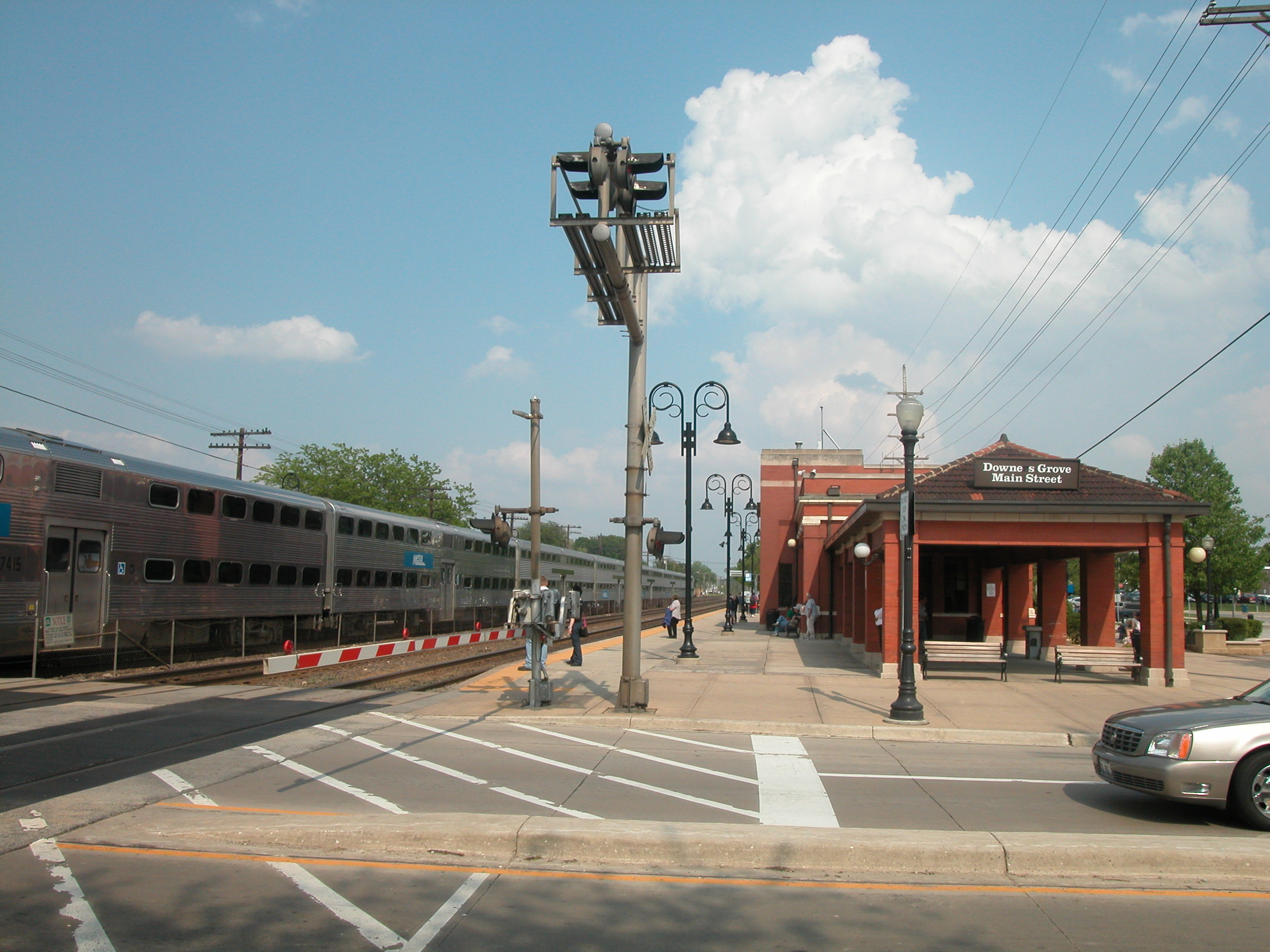

General information
- Location: 5001 Main Street; Downers Grove, Illinois, U.S.
- Coordinates: 41.7954°N 88.0099°W
- Owner: Village of Downers Grove
- Line: BNSF Chicago Subdivision
- Platforms: 2 side platforms
- Tracks: 3
- Connections: Pace

Construction
- Parking: Yes
- Accessible: Yes

Other information
- Fare zone: 4

History
- Opened: 1911

Passengers
- October 2025: 1,530 (average weekday)
- Rank: 6 out of 236

Services
Preceding station	Metra	Following station
Belmont toward Aurora	BNSF	Fairview Avenue toward Union Station
Former services
Preceding station	Burlington Route	Following station
Belmont toward Aurora	Suburban Service	Fairview Avenue toward Chicago
Lisle toward Minneapolis	Minneapolis – Chicago	Westmont toward Chicago
Track layout
Location

Downers Grove Main Street (also known as Downers Grove or Main Street) is one of three railroad stations on Metra's BNSF Line in Downers Grove, Illinois. The station is at Main Street, 21.1 miles (34.0 km) from Union Station, the east end of the line. As of 2025, Downers Grove Main Street is the sixth busiest of Metra's 236 non-downtown stations, with an average of 1,530 weekday boardings. The local police department and library are nearby. Parking lots are managed by the Village of Downers Grove.

The station has connections to multiple Pace Buses, including the Commuter Shuttle lines.

This station was the site of the 1947 Zephyr train wreck that killed 3 and injured more than 30.

The station underwent a $1.1 million platform replacement project, which finished in the summer of 2015.

Many trains on the BNSF run express to or from Downers Grove. This is common during the morning and evening rush hours, in an effort to get passengers to the busier stations quicker.

As of September 8, 2025, Downers Grove is served by 66 trains (33 in each direction) on weekdays, and by all 40 trains (20 in each direction) on weekends and holidays. On weekdays, one train originates at Downers Grove.

== Bus connections ==
Pace Bus

- 834 Joliet/Downers Grove
