= Western Avenue station (BNSF Railway) =

Commuter rail station in Chicago, Illinois

Western Avenue

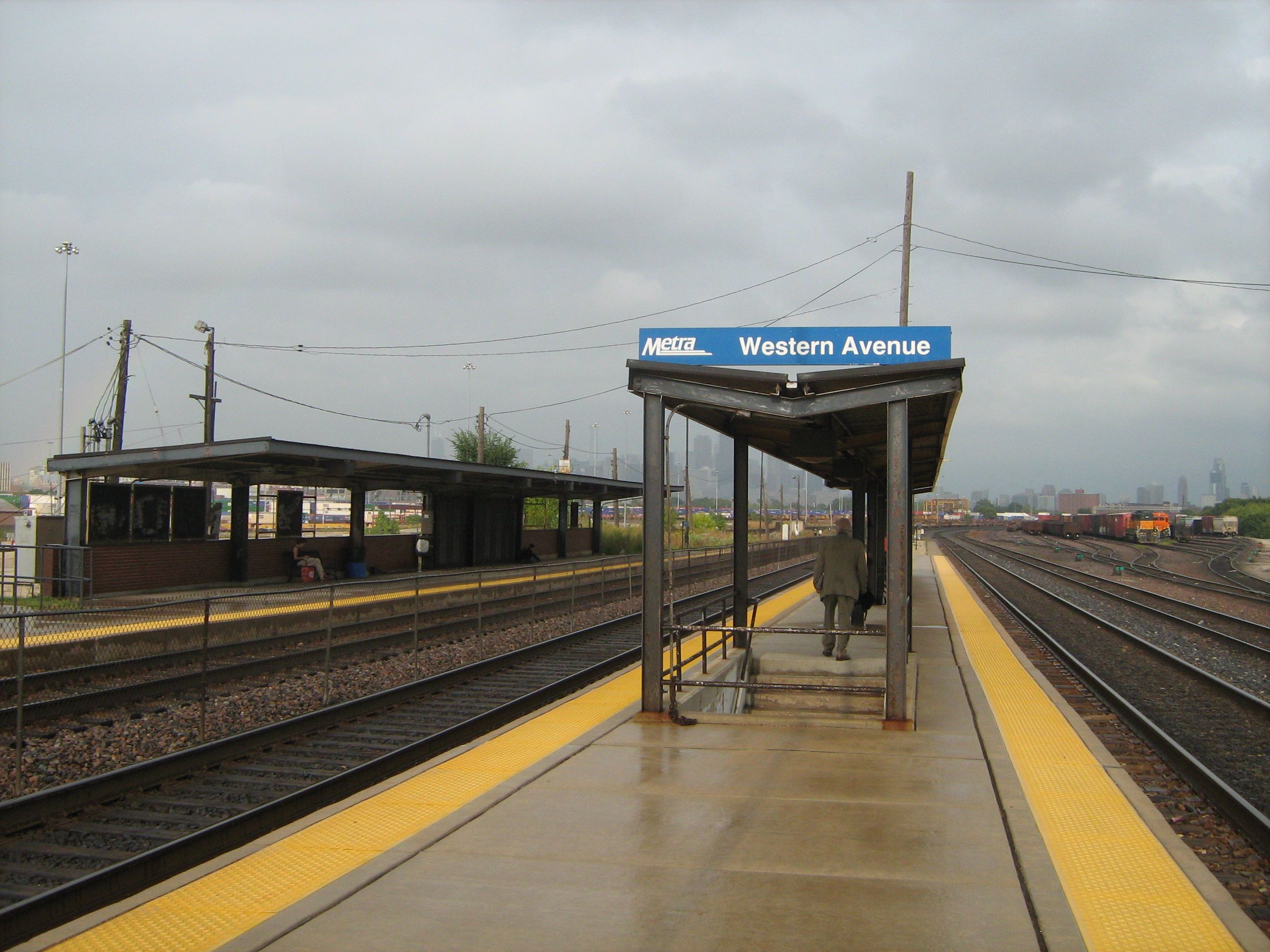
- Western Avenue station in September 2009

General information
- Location: Western Avenue and 18th Place; Chicago, Illinois
- Coordinates: 41.8578°N 87.6853°W
- Owner: BNSF
- Line: BNSF Chicago Subdivision
- Platforms: 1 side platform, 1 island platform
- Tracks: 4
- Connections: Pink at Western; CTA Bus

Construction
- Accessible: No

Other information
- Fare zone: 2

History
- Opened: 1905
- Rebuilt: 1978

Passengers
- 2018: 57 (average weekday) ▲26.7%
- Rank: 208 out of 236

Services
Preceding station	Metra	Following station
Cicero toward Aurora	BNSF	Halsted Street toward Union Station
Former services
Preceding station	Burlington Route	Following station
Cicero toward Aurora	Suburban Service	Halsted Street toward Chicago
Track layout
Location

Western Avenue (also known as Western Avenue & 18th Place) is a station on Metra's BNSF Line located in the Pilsen neighborhood of Chicago, Illinois. The station consists of one side platform and one island platform for outbound and inbound trains. The station has no station house, though shelters are provided. Amtrak and BNSF Railway trains run on tracks parallel to the station. The station is 3.7 miles (6.0 km) away from Union Station, the eastern terminus of the BNSF Line. As of 2018, Western Avenue is the 208th busiest of Metra's 236 non-downtown stations, with an average of 57 weekday boardings.

== Location ==
Western Avenue station is located near the Western Pink Line 'L' station, as well as the Western station on the Blue Line's Congress branch. It is also located near an overpass for CSX Transportation and the Norfolk Southern Railway and a BNSF Railway yard.

== Service ==
As of September 8, 2025, Western Avenue is served by 57 trains (28 inbound, 29 outbound) on weekdays, and by 36 trains (18 in each direction) on weekends and holidays.

== Bus connections ==
CTA

- 18 16th/18th
- 49 Western (Owl Service)
- X49 Western Express (weekday rush hours only)
