= Fairview Avenue/Downers Grove station =

Commuter rail station in Illinois

Fairview Avenue

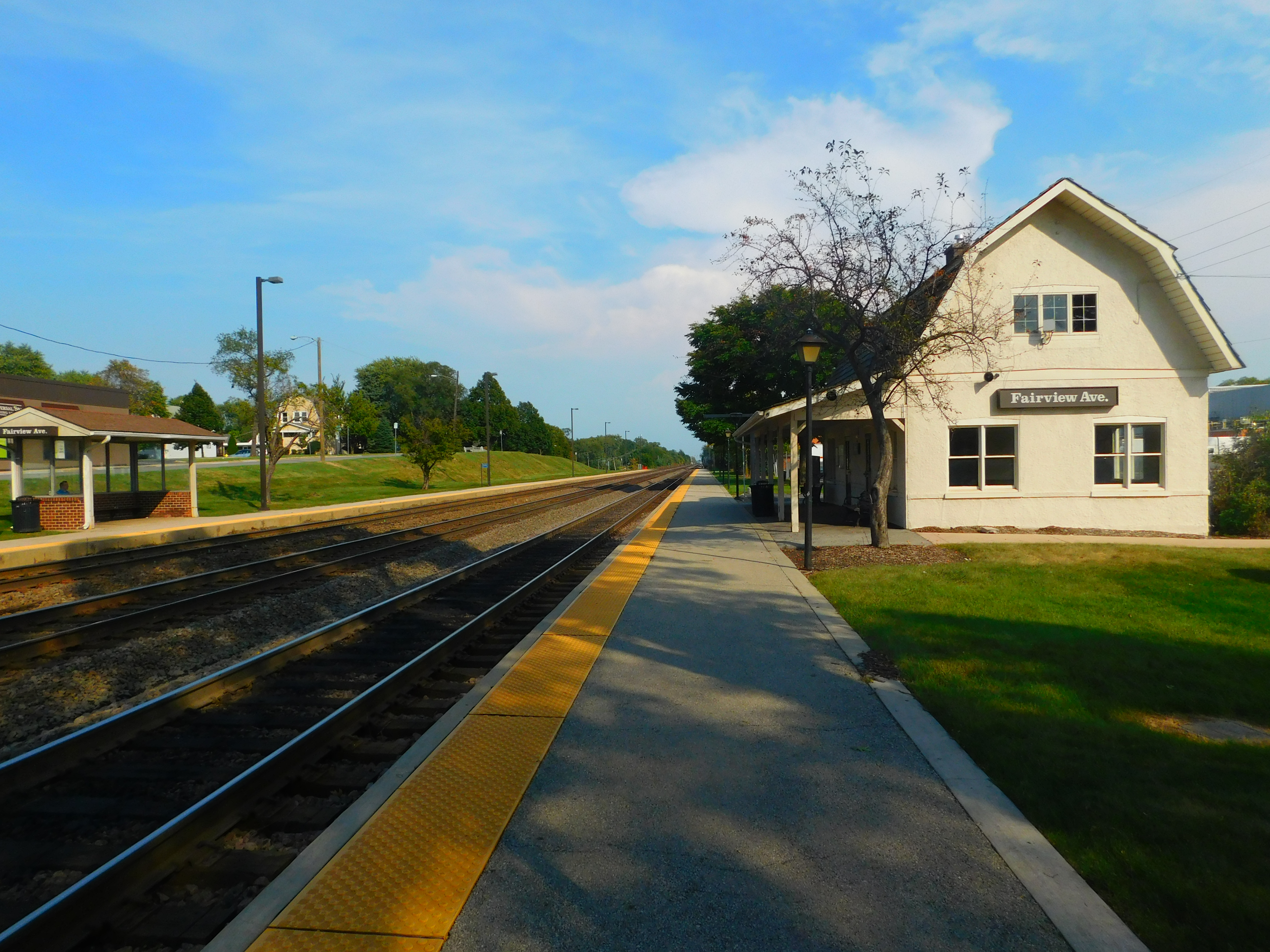
- Fairview Avenue station in September 2016

General information
- Location: Fairview & Burlington Avenues; Downers Grove, Illinois
- Coordinates: 41.7954°N 87.9940°W
- Owner: Village of Downers Grove
- Line: BNSF Chicago Subdivision
- Platforms: 2 Side platforms
- Tracks: 3

Construction
- Parking: Yes
- Accessible: Yes, partial (Note: At partially accessible stations, customers using mobility devices can access and use trains; however, the stations may not have other accessibility features such as accessible bathrooms, Braille signage, visual display announcements, etc.)

Other information
- Fare zone: 3

History
- Opened: 1917

Passengers
- 2018: 415 (average weekday) ▼9.4%
- Rank: 113 out of 236

Services
Preceding station	Metra	Following station
Downers Grove toward Aurora	BNSF	Westmont toward Union Station
Former services
Preceding station	Burlington Route	Following station
Downers Grove Main Street toward Aurora	Suburban Service	Westmont toward Chicago
Track layout
Location

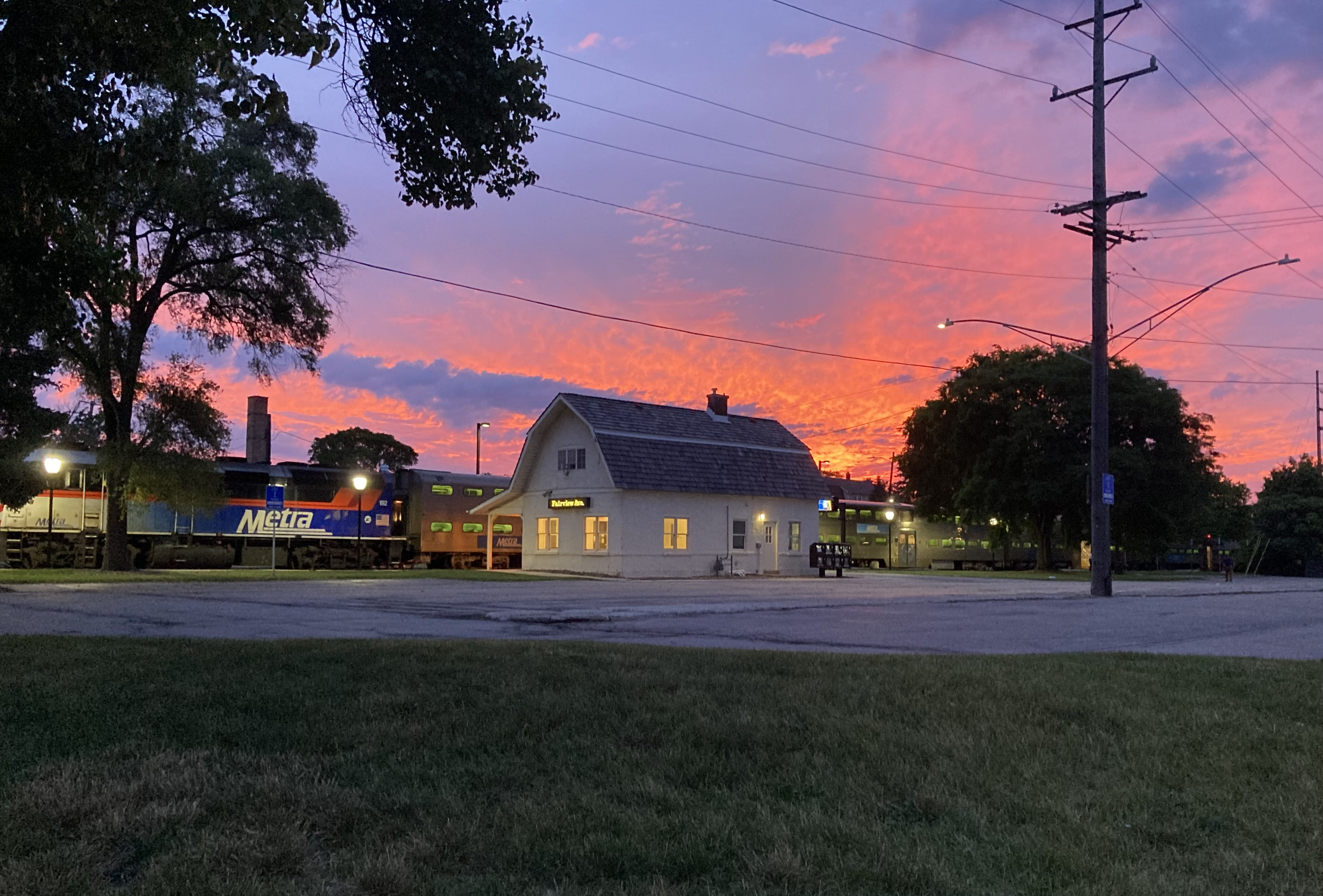
Sunrise over Fairview Avenue Station, June 2024: BNSF 1204 waits to depart for Chicago Union Station.

Fairview Avenue is one of three railroad stations on Metra's BNSF Line in Downers Grove, Illinois. The station is 20.3 miles (32.7 km) from Union Station, the east end of the line. As of 2018, Fairview Avenue is the 113th busiest of Metra's 236 non-downtown stations, with an average of 415 weekday boardings. Though its official address is on Fairview Avenue (hence the name) and Burlington Avenue, the main parking lot is on the south side of the tracks off of nearby Second Street. All parking lots, including the main parking lot are managed by the Village of Downers Grove.

The original Fairview Avenue station opened around 1890 and was called East Grove. It was replaced in 1916 by the current structure, which was designed by the engineering staff of the Chicago, Burlington and Quincy Railroad and cost $3,300 to build. The colonial barn-type design is more akin to railroad stations of the Northeastern United States, such as those on the Long Island Rail Road, and also matching the adjacent Pepperidge Farm bakery. The design was intended to portray a rural image.

As of September 8, 2025, Fairview Avenue is served by 64 trains (32 in each direction) on weekdays, and by 36 trains (18 in each direction) on weekends and holidays. On weekdays, 10 trains originate, and seven trains terminate, at Fairview Avenue. Currently, no buses run near the station.

== Incident ==
On August 26, 1991, a 41-year-old woman, Mary T. Wojtyla, was killed at this station after being struck by a westbound Metra express train. The accident was captured on camera by a railfan and an edited version of the footage cutting out the moment of impact is often used by Operation Lifesaver to stress the importance of rail safety.
