= Lisle station =

Commuter rail station in Lisle, Illinois

Lisle

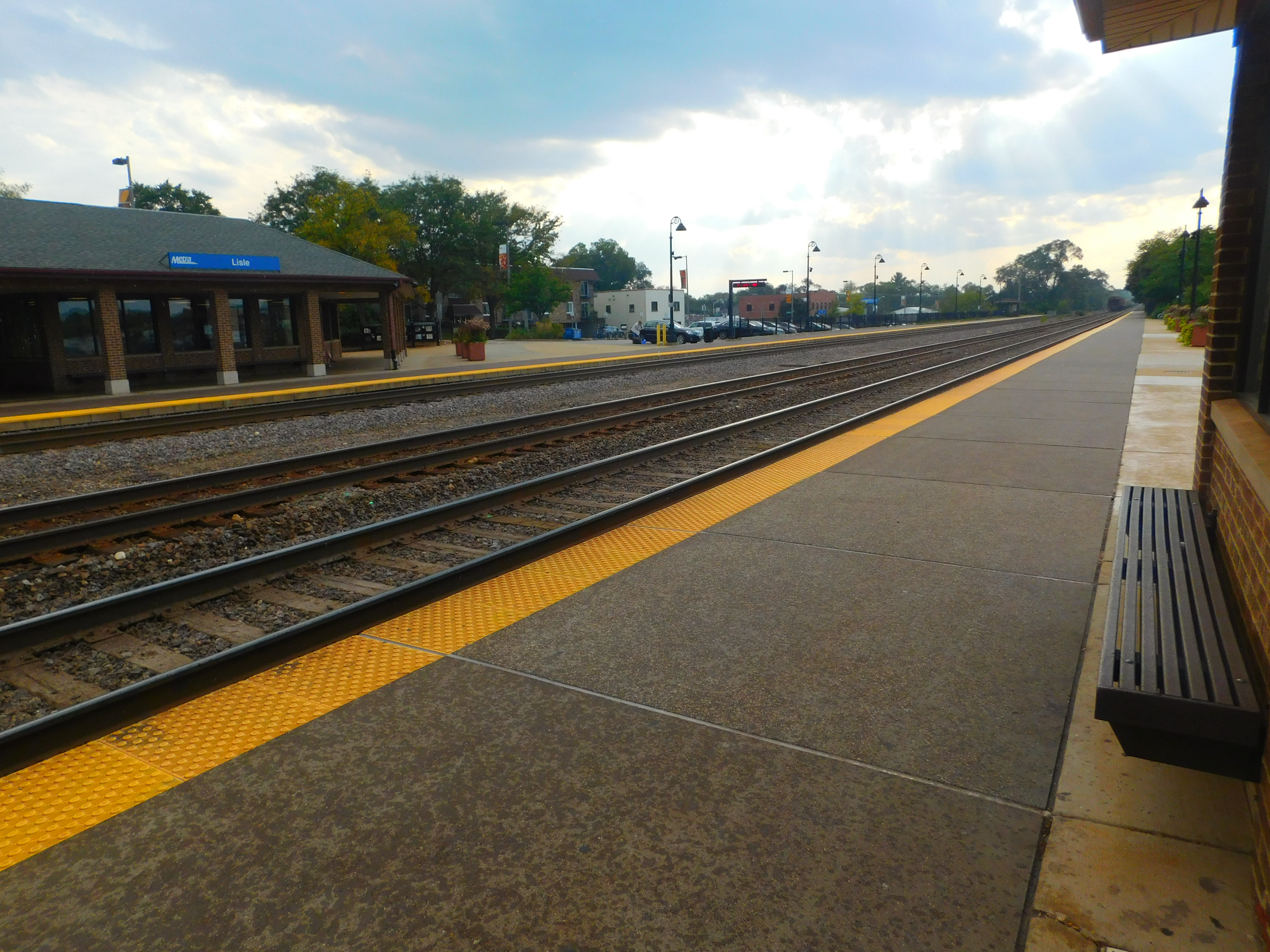

General information
- Location: 1000 Front Street; Lisle, Illinois
- Coordinates: 41.7977°N 88.0720°W
- Owner: Village of Lisle
- Line: BNSF Chicago Subdivision
- Platforms: 2 side platforms (1 island platform demolished)
- Tracks: 3
- Connections: Pace Bus

Construction
- Accessible: Yes

Other information
- Fare zone: 4

History
- Opened: 1864
- Rebuilt: 1874, 1996

Passengers
- 2018: 1,895 (average weekday) ▲5.9%
- Rank: 10 out of 236

Services
Preceding station	Metra	Following station
Naperville toward Aurora	BNSF	Belmont toward Union Station
Former services
Preceding station	Burlington Route	Following station
Naperville toward Aurora	Suburban Service	Belmont toward Chicago
Naperville toward Minneapolis	Minneapolis – Chicago	Downers Grove toward Chicago
Track layout
Location

Lisle station is a commuter railroad station along Metra's BNSF Line in Lisle, Illinois. The station is at 1000 Front Street, 24.4 miles (39.3 km) from Union Station, the east end of the line. As of 2018, Lisle is the 10th busiest of Metra's 236 non-downtown stations, with an average of 1,895 weekday boardings. It is near the Village Hall on Burlington Avenue and the St. Joan of Arc School. Parking for the station is also available near these locations, as well as further east near St. Joseph Creek Road and as far north as Ogden Avenue. Amtrak trains pass through the station but do not stop.

Lisle station was originally built by the Chicago, Burlington and Quincy Railroad in 1864. A fire destroyed the first railroad depot, but it was rebuilt in 1874 by the CB&Q. Currently, the station has a much more contemporary appearance, and even contains a pedestrian tunnel.

As of September 8, 2025, Lisle is served by 68 trains (32 inbound, 36 outbound) on weekdays, and by all 40 trains (20 in each direction) on weekends and holidays. On weekdays, two inbound trains originate at Lisle.
