= Cicero station (Metra) =

Commuter rail station in Cicero, Illinois

Cicero

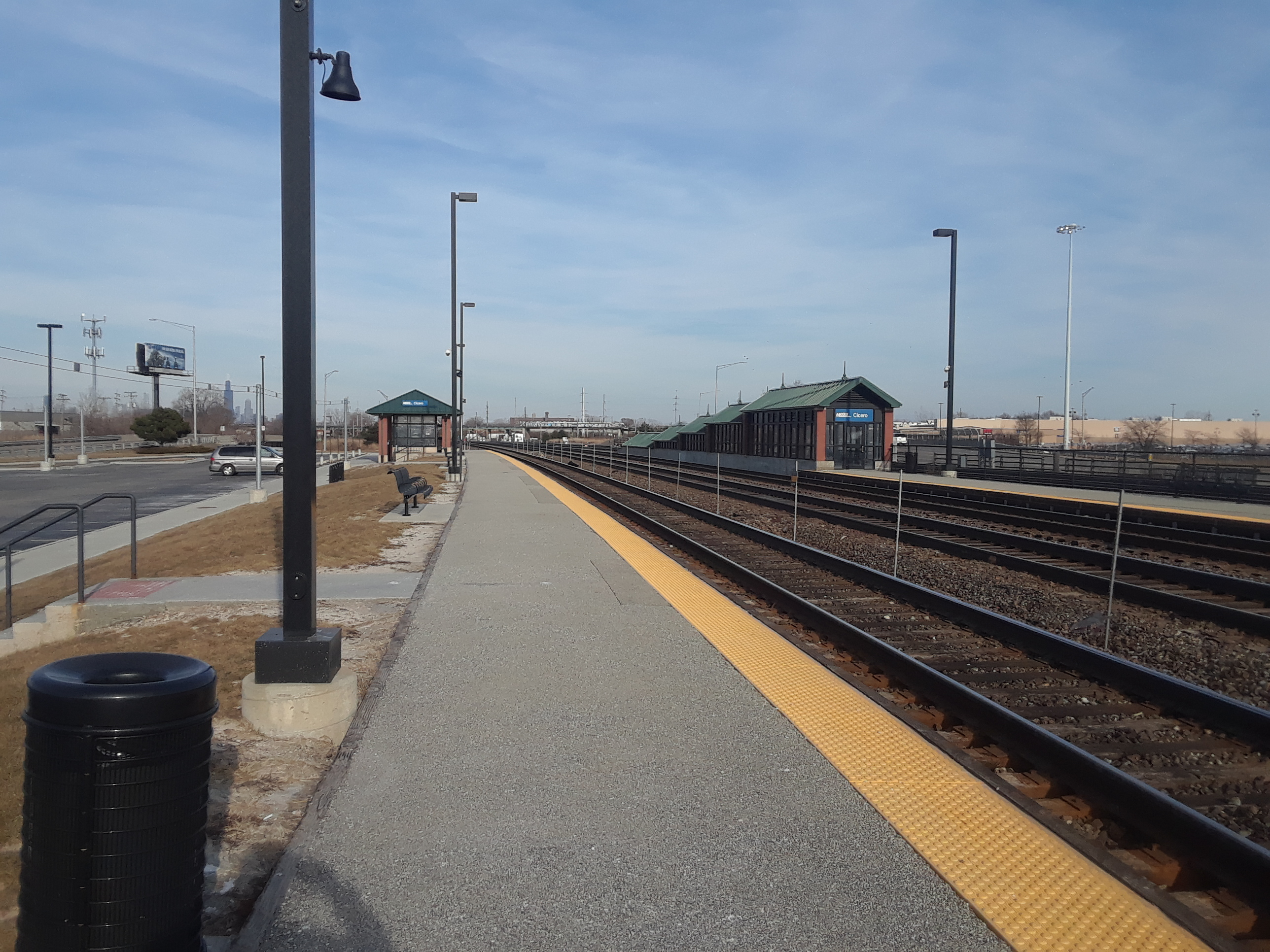

General information
- Location: 26th & Cicero; Cicero, Illinois
- Coordinates: 41.8443°N 87.7452°W
- Owner: BNSF Railway
- Line: BNSF Chicago Subdivision
- Platforms: 2 side platforms
- Tracks: 6
- Connections: CTA Bus

Construction
- Accessible: Yes

Other information
- Fare zone: 2

History
- Opened: 1978
- Rebuilt: 2010, 2014

Passengers
- 2018: 136 (average weekday) ▼26.5%
- Rank: 176 out of 236

Services
Preceding station	Metra	Following station
LaVergne Weekday Limited toward Aurora	BNSF	Western Avenue toward Union Station
Former services
Preceding station	Metra	Following station
Clyde Closed 2007 toward Aurora	BNSF	Western Avenue toward Union Station
Preceding station	Burlington Route	Following station
Morton Park toward Aurora	Suburban Service	Western Avenue toward Chicago
Track layout
Location

Cicero is a station on Metra's BNSF Line, located in Cicero, Illinois. The station is 7 miles (11.3 km) away from Union Station, the eastern terminus of the line. In Metra's zone-based fare system, Cicero is in zone 2. As of 2018, Cicero is the 176th busiest of Metra's 236 non-downtown stations, with an average of 136 weekday boardings. The station is located east of the Cicero Railroad Yard, and several blocks south of the Cicero station on the Cermak Branch of the Chicago "L"'s Pink Line.

Metra rebuilt the station's platforms and shelters in 2010.

As of September 8, 2025, Cicero is served by 57 trains (28 inbound, 29 outbound) on weekdays, and by 36 trains (18 in each direction) on weekends and holidays.

== Bus connections ==
CTA

- 35 31st/35th
- 54 Cicero
- 54B South Cicero
- 60 Blue Island/26th (Owl Service)
