= LaVergne station =

Commuter rail station in Berwyn, Illinois

LaVergne

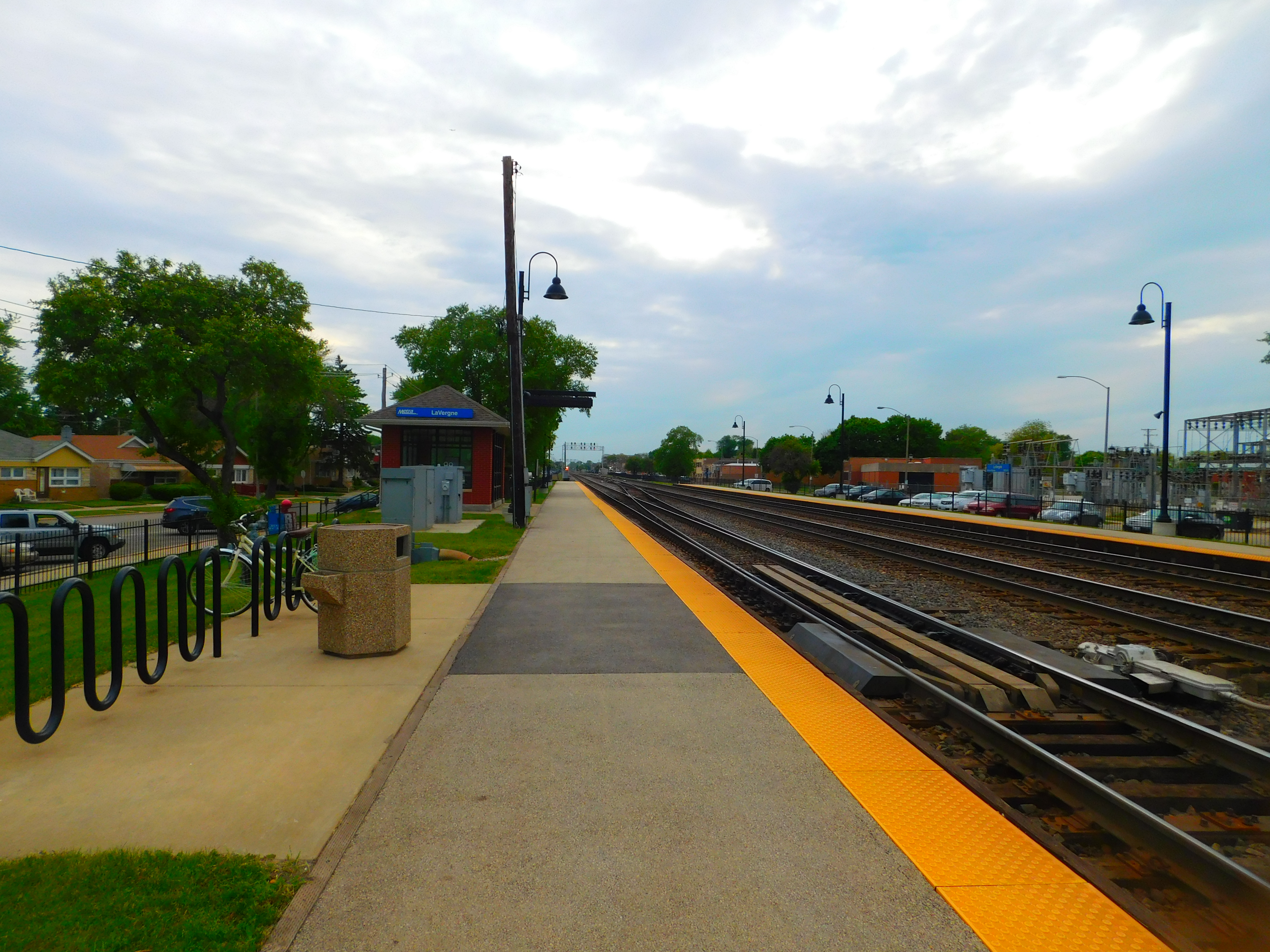
- LaVergne station in May 2016

General information
- Location: Windsor & Ridgeland Avenue; Berwyn, Illinois
- Coordinates: 41.8355°N 87.7835°W
- Owner: Metra
- Line: BNSF Chicago Subdivision
- Platforms: 2 side platforms
- Tracks: 3
- Connections: Pace Buses

Construction
- Cycle facilities: Yes; Bike Racks
- Accessible: Yes

Other information
- Fare zone: 2

Passengers
- 2018: 174 (average weekday) ▼7%
- Rank: 167 out of 236

Services
Preceding station	Metra	Following station
Berwyn toward Aurora	BNSF	Cicero toward Union Station
Former services
Preceding station	Metra	Following station
Berwyn toward Aurora	BNSF	Clyde Closed 2007 toward Union Station
Preceding station	Burlington Route	Following station
Berwyn toward Aurora	Suburban Service	Clyde toward Chicago
Track layout
Location

LaVergne is one of three stations on Metra's BNSF Line located in Berwyn, Illinois. The station is 9 miles (14.5 km) away from Union Station, the eastern terminus of the line. In Metra's zone-based fare system, LaVergne is in zone 2. As of 2018, LaVergne is the 167th busiest of Metra's 236 non-downtown stations, with an average of 174 weekday boardings. It is just west of the large BNSF Cicero Yard and the Canadian National's (former Illinois Central Railroad) Freeport Subdivision.

As of September 8, 2025, LaVergne is served by 22 trains (11 in each direction) on weekdays. No weekend or holiday service is provided.

== Bus connections ==
Pace

- "Route 302 – Ogden/Stanley". PaceBus.com. Chicago: Pace Suburban Bus Service.
- "Route 314 – Ridgeland". PaceBus.com. Chicago: Pace Suburban Bus Service.
