= Clyde railway station =

Clyde railway station may refer to:

- Clyde railway station, Sydney, Australia
- Clyde railway station, Victoria, Australia
- Clyde station (Illinois), a former commuter rail station in Cicero, Illinois, United States
