= Halsted Street station =

Commuter rail station in Chicago, Illinois

Halsted Street

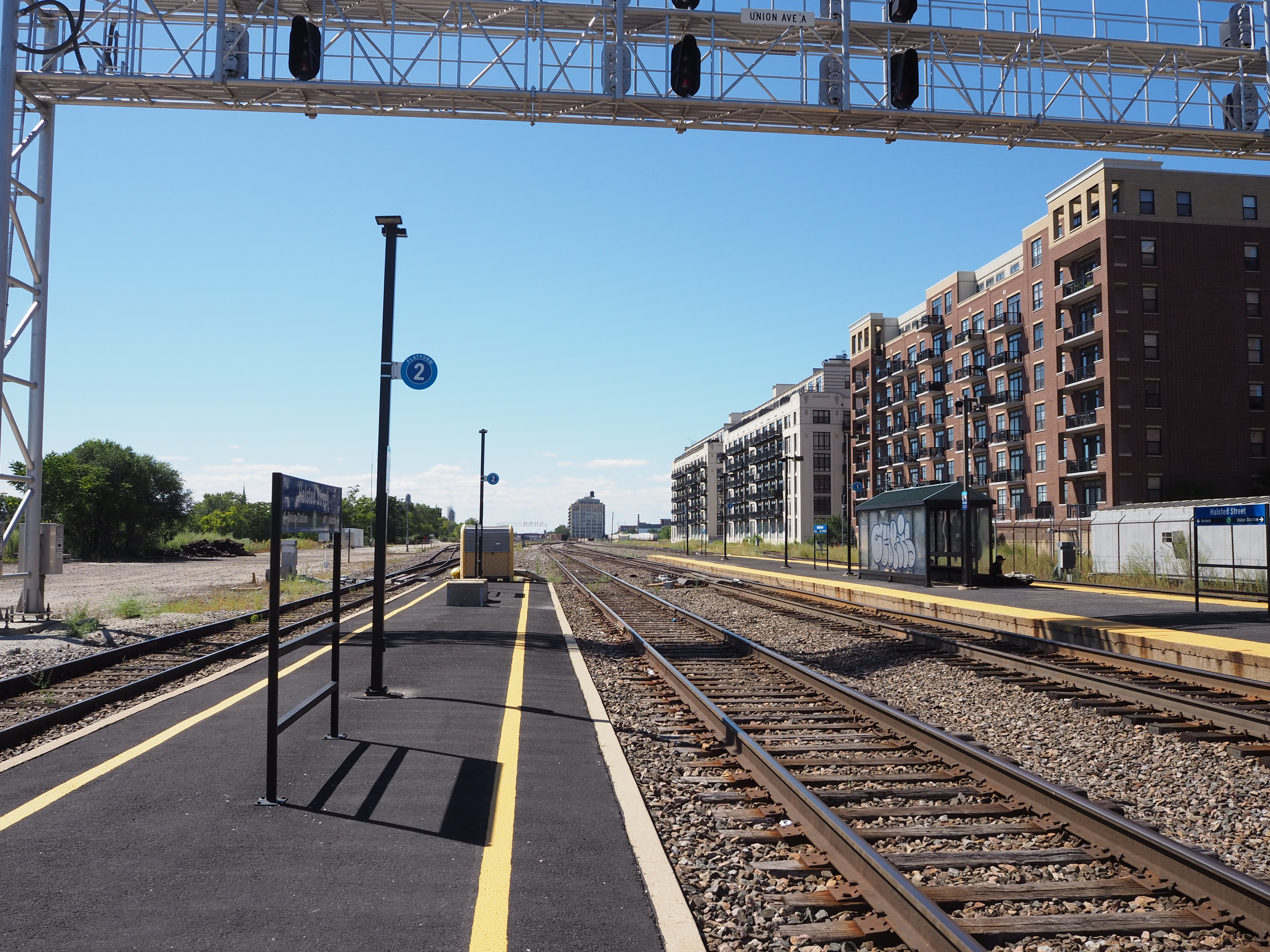
- Halsted Street station seen from platform 2 in September 2024.

General information
- Location: 16th & Halsted Street; Chicago, Illinois
- Coordinates: 41.8604°N 87.6473°W
- Line: BNSF Chicago Subdivision
- Platforms: 2 island platforms (1 in use)
- Tracks: 4
- Connections: CTA bus

Construction
- Accessible: No

Other information
- Fare zone: 2

Passengers
- 2018: 115 (average weekday) ▼4.2%
- Rank: 182 out of 236

Services
Preceding station	Metra	Following station
Western Avenue toward Aurora	BNSF	Union Station Terminus
Former services
Preceding station	Burlington Route	Following station
Western Avenue toward Aurora	Suburban Service	Chicago Terminus
Track layout
Location

Halsted Street, also known as Halsted Street/UIC, is a station on Metra's BNSF Line, located in Chicago, Illinois. The station is 1.8 miles (2.9 km) away from Union Station, the eastern terminus of the BNSF Line. As of 2018, Halsted Street is the 182nd busiest of Metra's 236 non-downtown stations, with an average of 115 weekday boardings. The elevated station consists of two island platforms on an embankment near an overpass. Only platform 1 is actively used for passenger service, though both platforms 1 and 2 were recently rehabilitated as of 2024. There are staircases leading to the southbound sidewalk of Halsted Street, as well as two unstaffed shelters on platform 1.

As of September 8, 2025, Halsted Street is served by 57 trains (28 inbound, 29 outbound) on weekdays, and by 36 trains (18 in each direction) on weekends and holidays. According to Metra, the historically lightly-used station has seen a large ridership increase following the introduction of a Metra free fare pass option for UIC students in fall 2024.

== Bus connections ==
CTA

- 8 Halsted
- 18 16th/18th
- N62 Archer (Owl Service – overnight only)
