= Riverside station (Illinois) =

Commuter rail station in Riverside, Illinois

Riverside

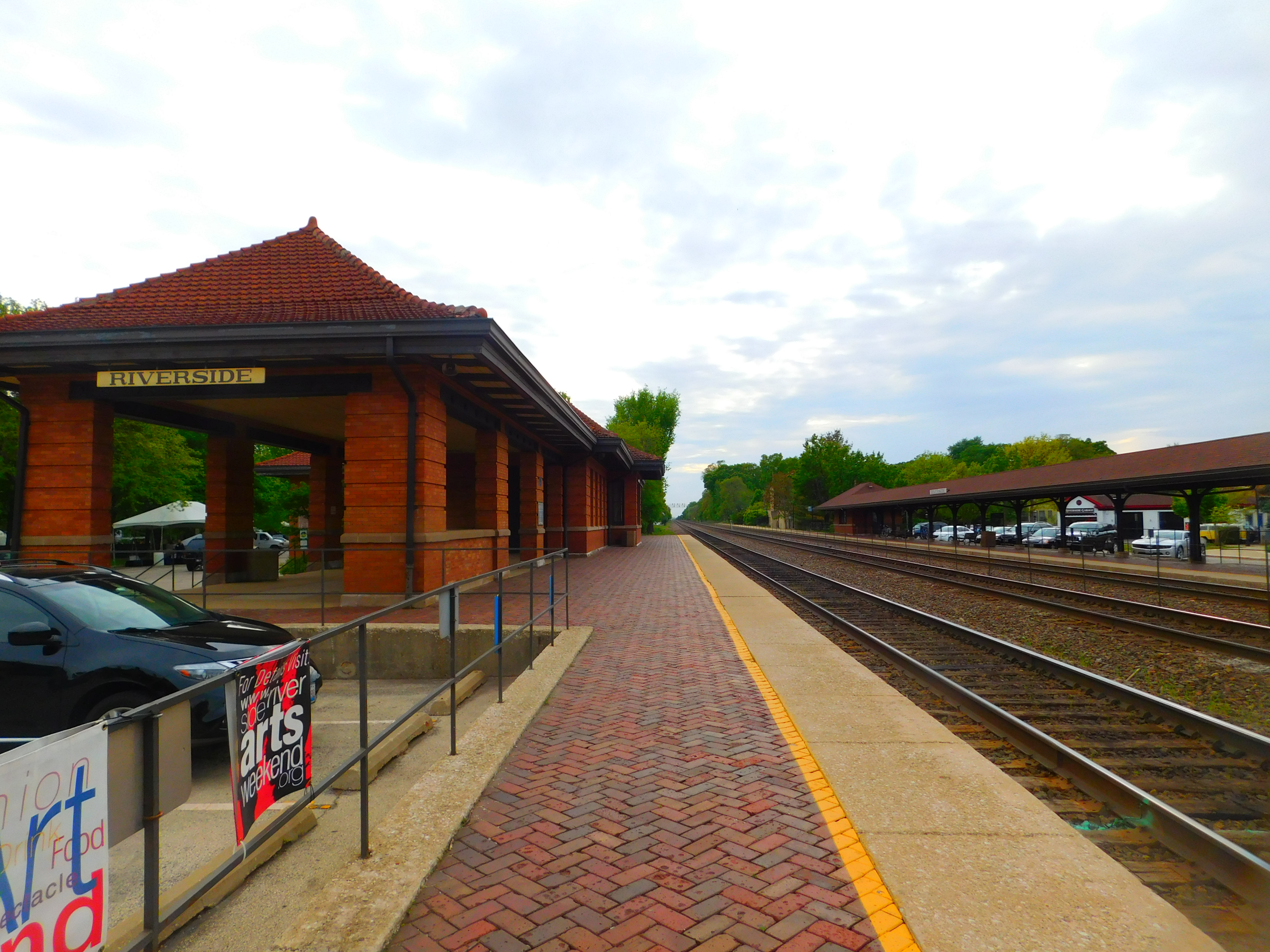

General information
- Location: 90 Bloomingbank Road; Riverside, Illinois
- Coordinates: 41.8272°N 87.8201°W
- Owner: Village of Riverside
- Line: BNSF Chicago Subdivision
- Platforms: 2 side platforms
- Tracks: 3

Construction
- Accessible: Yes, partial (Note: At partially accessible stations, customers using mobility devices can access and use trains; however, the stations may not have other accessibility features such as accessible bathrooms, Braille signage, visual display announcements, etc.)

Other information
- Fare zone: 2

History
- Opened: 1902

Passengers
- 2018: 493 (average weekday) ▼1.2%
- Rank: 100 out of 236

Services
Preceding station	Metra	Following station
Hollywood toward Aurora	BNSF	Harlem Avenue toward Union Station
Former services
Preceding station	Burlington Route	Following station
Hollywood toward Aurora	Suburban Service	Harlem Avenue toward Chicago
Track layout
Location

Riverside is a station on Metra's BNSF Line in Riverside, Illinois. The station is 11 miles (17.7 km) from Union Station, the east end of the line. In Metra's zone-based fare system, Riverside is in zone 2. As of 2018, Riverside is the 100th busiest of Metra's 236 non-downtown stations, with an average of 493 weekday boardings. A staffed station building is on the south side of the three tracks.

The station was built about 1901 by the Chicago, Burlington and Quincy Railroad according to a design by the company's general architect, Walter Theodore Krausch. It is covered with Ludowici clay roof tiles, which were replaced by the original manufacturer in 2017.

As of September 8, 2025, Riverside is served by 51 trains (25 inbound, 26 outbound) on weekdays, and by 36 trains (18 in each direction) on weekends and holidays.
