= Hollywood station (Illinois) =

Commuter rail station in Brookfield, Illinois

Hollywood/Zoo Stop

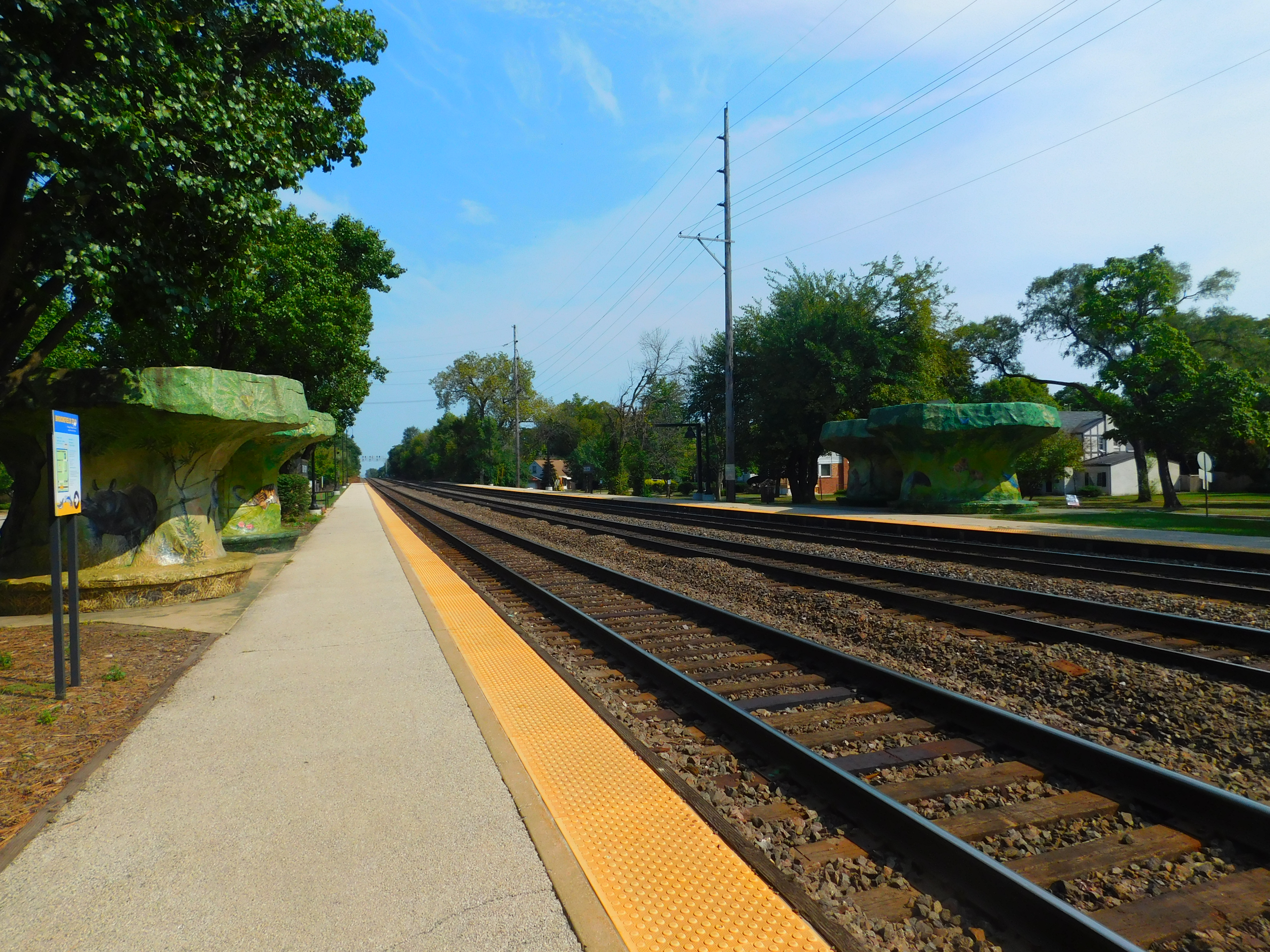
- The platforms of Hollywood station with their distinctive shelters designed for the Brookfield Zoo

General information
- Location: Golf Road and Hollywood Avenue; Brookfield, Illinois
- Coordinates: 41.8242°N 87.8337°W
- Owner: Metra
- Line: BNSF Chicago Subdivision
- Platforms: 2 side platforms
- Tracks: 3
- Connections: Pace Buses

Construction
- Accessible: Yes

Other information
- Fare zone: 2

History
- Opened: 1893
- Rebuilt: 1976

Passengers
- 2018: 120 (average weekday) 0%
- Rank: 181 out of 236

Services
Preceding station	Metra	Following station
Brookfield toward Aurora	BNSF	Riverside toward Union Station
Former services
Preceding station	Burlington Route	Following station
Brookfield toward Aurora	Suburban Service	Riverside toward Chicago
Track layout
Location

Hollywood is one of three stations on Metra's BNSF Line in Brookfield, Illinois. The station is 11.7 miles (18.8 km) from Union Station, the east end of the line. In Metra's zone-based fare system, Hollywood is in zone 2. As of 2018, Hollywood is the 181st busiest of Metra's 236 non-downtown stations, with an average of 120 weekday boardings. An unstaffed shelter is on the north side of the three tracks.

Hollywood station is the main stop for the Brookfield Zoo. It was originally built in 1893 when Samuel Eberly Gross, a Chicago lawyer, began selling building lots platted from farms and woodlands he had acquired along both sides of the Chicago, Burlington & Quincy Railroad line. He did the same thing with the current Brookfield station in 1889, and the former West Grossdale station in 1895. All three developments built by Gross voted to be incorporated into the Village of Grossdale. After Gross divorced his first wife, married a teenager, filed for bankruptcy and moved to Michigan, the residents voted to change the name of the village to Brookfield as well as two of the stations in 1905. Hollywood station, however, kept its original name.

As of September 8, 2025, Hollywood is served by 39 trains (20 inbound, 19 outbound) on weekdays, and by 22 trains (11 in each direction) on weekends and holidays.

== Bus connections ==
Pace

- "Route 331 – Cumberland - 5th Avenue". PaceBus.com. Chicago: Pace Suburban Bus Service.
