= Berwyn station (Metra) =

Commuter rail station in Berwyn, Illinois

Berwyn

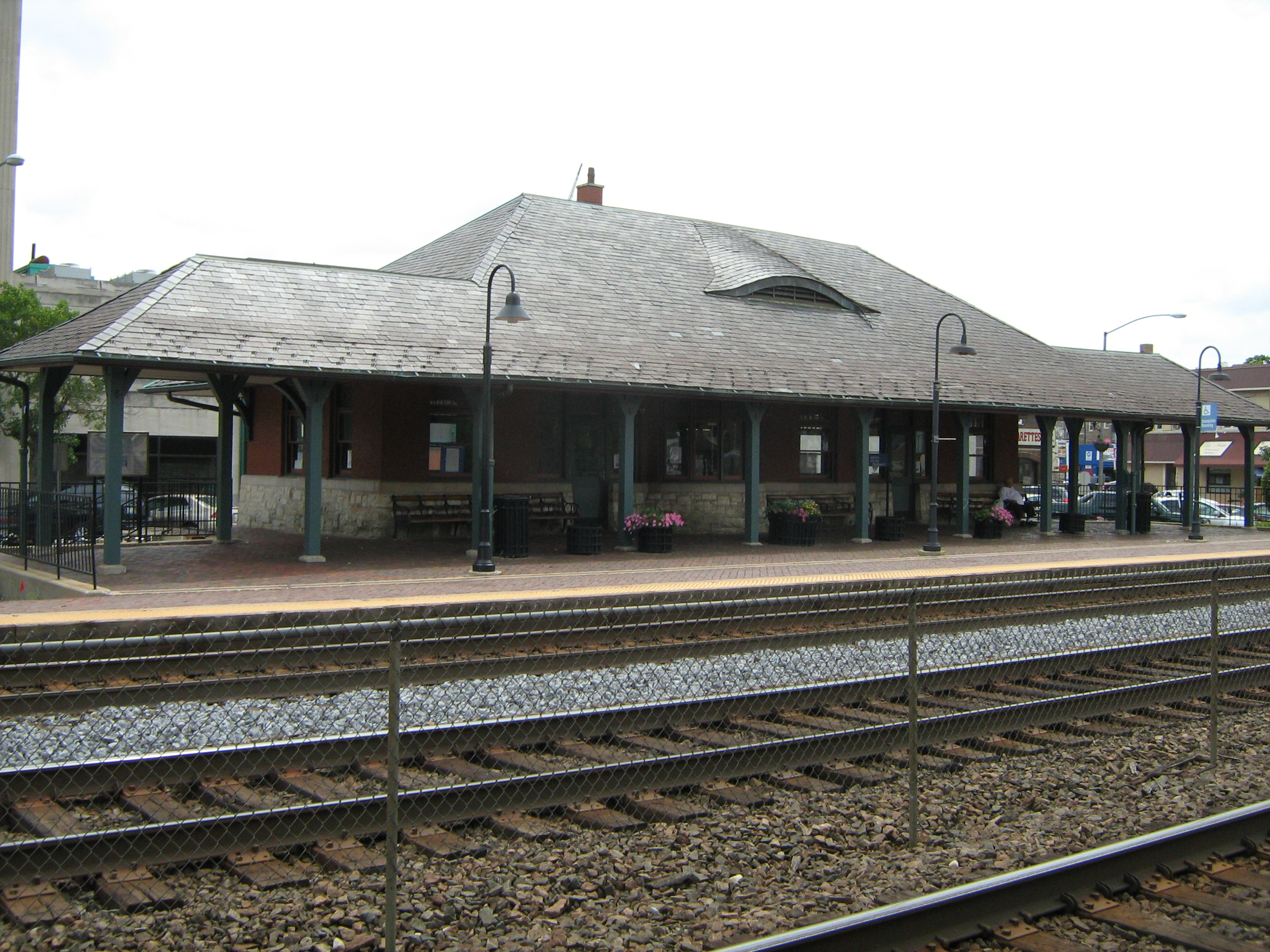

General information
- Location: 6801 West Windsor Avenue; Berwyn, Illinois 60402
- Coordinates: 41.8331°N 87.7935°W
- Owner: City of Berwyn
- Line: BNSF Chicago Subdivision
- Platforms: 2 side platforms
- Tracks: 3
- Connections: Pace Buses

Construction
- Parking: Yes
- Cycle facilities: Yes; Bicycle rack
- Accessible: Yes

Other information
- Fare zone: 2

History
- Opened: 1890

Passengers
- 2018: 669 (average weekday) ▲5.9%
- Rank: 79 out of 236

Services
Preceding station	Metra	Following station
Harlem Avenue toward Aurora	BNSF	LaVergne Weekday Limited toward Union Station
Former services
Preceding station	Burlington Route	Following station
Harlem Avenue toward Aurora	Suburban Service	La Vergne toward Chicago
Track layout
Location

Berwyn is one of three stations on Metra's BNSF Line in Berwyn, Illinois. The station is 9.6 miles (15.4 km) from Union Station, the east end of the line. In Metra's zone-based fare system, Berwyn is in zone 2. As of 2018, Berwyn is the 79th busiest of Metra's 236 non-downtown stations, with an average of 669 weekday boardings.

Originally known as Burlington Suburban Station and built in 1890 for the Chicago, Burlington and Quincy Railroad line. It was formally determined to be eligible to be listed on the National Register of Historic Places in 1982, but, apparently because of the objections of the CB&Q, it was not listed.

As of September 8, 2025, Berwyn is served by 51 trains (25 inbound, 26 outbound) on weekdays, and by 36 trains (18 in each direction) on weekends and holidays.

== Bus connections ==
Pace

- "Route 302 – Ogden / Stanley". PaceBus.com. Chicago: Pace Suburban Bus Service.
- "Route 311 – Oak Park Avenue". PaceBus.com. Chicago: Pace Suburban Bus Service.
