= LaGrange Road station =

Railroad station in La Grange, Illinois

LaGrange, IL
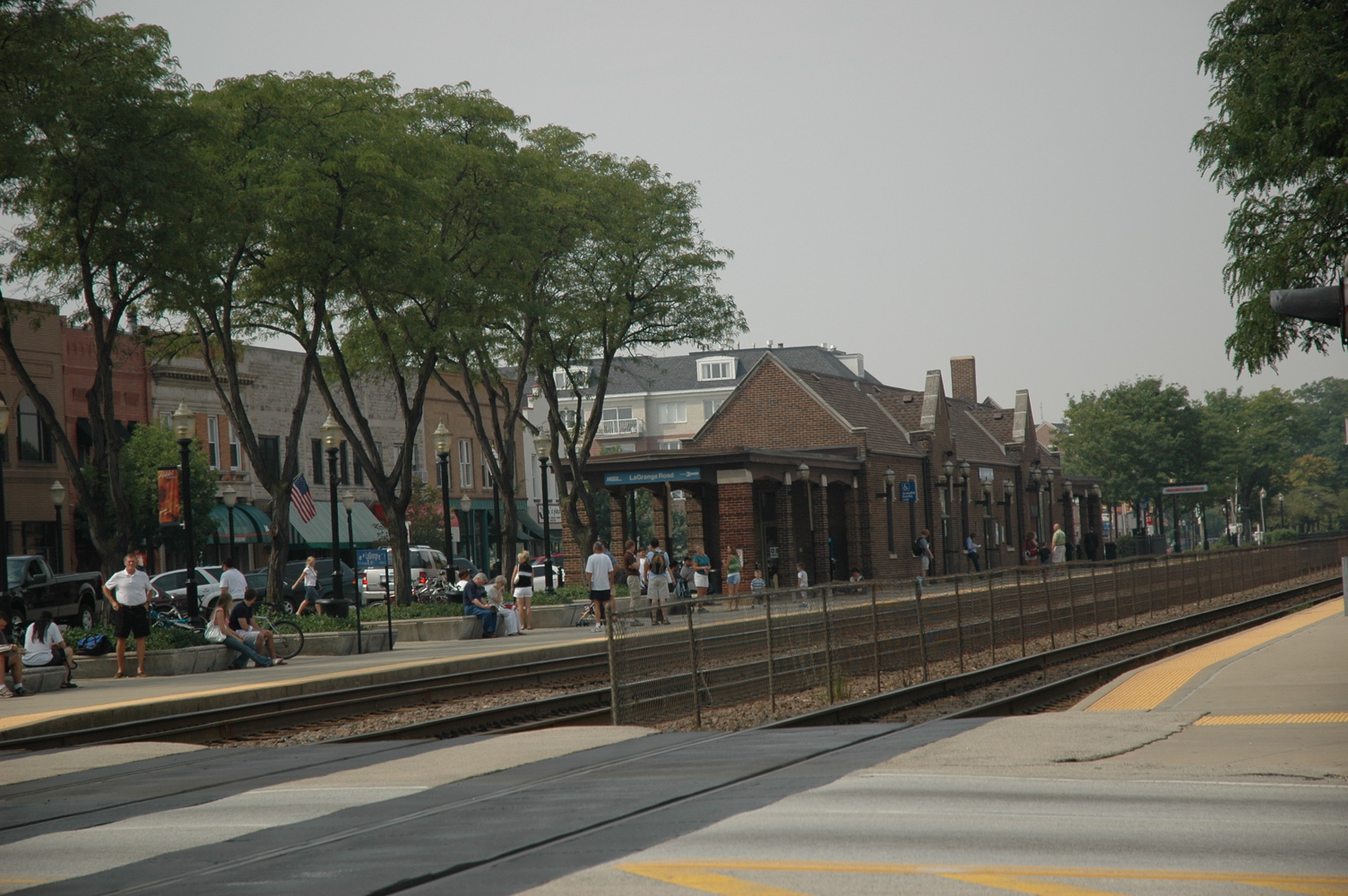

General information
- Location: 25 West Burlington Avenue at LaGrange Road; La Grange, Illinois; United States
- Coordinates: 41.8157°N 87.8711°W
- Owner: BNSF Railway, Amtrak
- Line: BNSF Chicago Subdivision
- Platforms: 2 side platforms
- Tracks: 3
- Connections: Pace

Construction
- Accessible: Yes

Other information
- Station code: Amtrak: LAG
- Fare zone: 3 (Metra)

History
- Opened: 1916

Passengers
- FY 2025: 9,129 annually (Amtrak)
- 2018: 1,452 (avg. weekday) ▲8.4% (Metra)
- Rank: 21 out of 236 (Metra)

Services
Preceding station	Amtrak	Following station
Naperville toward Quincy	Illinois Zephyr and Carl Sandburg	Chicago Terminus
California Zephyr does not stop here
Southwest Chief does not stop here
Preceding station	Metra	Following station
Stone Avenue Weekday Limited toward Aurora	BNSF	Congress Park Weekday Limited toward Union Station
Former services
Preceding station	Burlington Route	Following station
Aurora toward Denver	Main Line	Chicago Terminus
Aurora toward Minneapolis	Minneapolis – Chicago	Chicago Terminus
Stone Avenue toward Aurora	Suburban Service	Congress Park toward Chicago
Future services
Preceding station	Amtrak	Following station
Naperville toward Moline	Quad Cities Proposed	Chicago Terminus
Track layout
Location

LaGrange Road station, or La Grange station, is a train station in La Grange, Illinois. It is served by Amtrak's Illinois Zephyr and Carl Sandburg and Metra's BNSF Line. Amtrak's California Zephyr and Southwest Chief also pass by this station, but do not stop there. It is one of two stations in the suburb of La Grange. The other station, named Stone Avenue station, is .4 miles (0.64 km) away. La Grange is 13.7 miles (22.0 km) from Chicago Union Station, at 25 West Burlington Avenue between Ashland Avenue and LaGrange Road (U.S. 12-20-45). Parking is available along West Hillgrove and West Burlington Avenues.

On Friday, June 13, 2025, a freight train struck a semi truck that was stopped in the crossing on LaGrange Road, which in turn struck and damaged the station building. There were no injuries.

As of 2018, LaGrange Road is the 23rd busiest of Metra's 236 non-downtown stations, with an average of 1,452 weekday boardings.

As of September 8, 2025, LaGrange Road is served by 65 Metra trains (33 inbound, 32 outbound) on weekdays, and by 36 trains (18 in each direction) on weekends and holidays.

== Bus connections ==
Pace:

- 302 Ogden/Stanley (Monday-Saturday Only)
- 330 Mannheim/LaGrange Roads
- 331 Cumberland/5th Avenue (Weekdays Only)
