= Route 59 station =

Commuter rail station in Aurora and Naperville, Illinois

Route 59

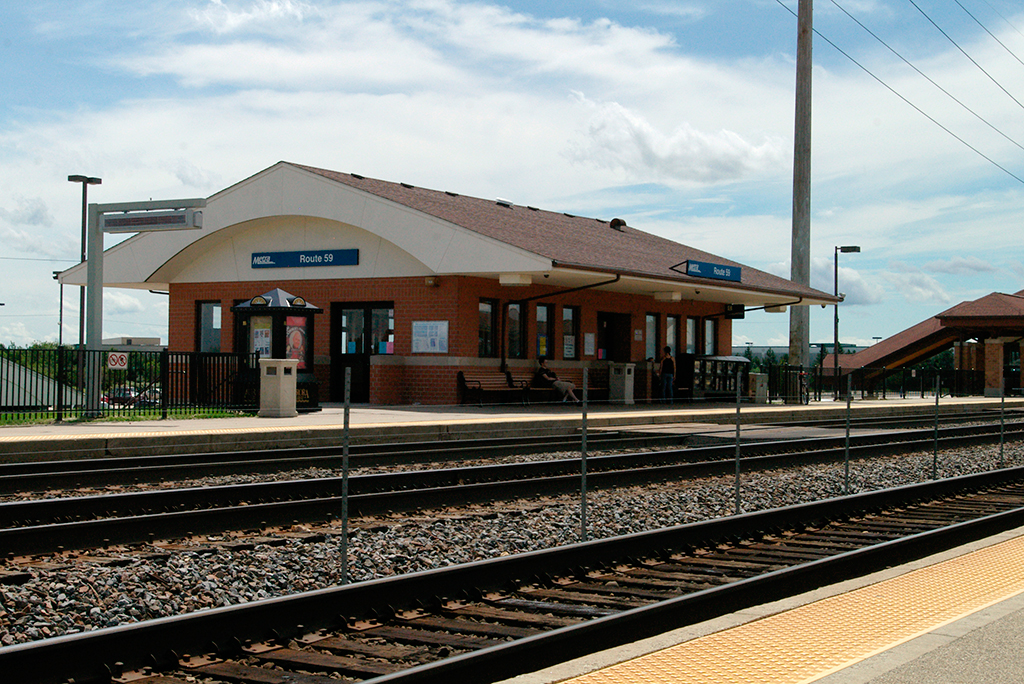
- Route 59 station in June 2010

General information
- Location: 1090 North Route 59, Aurora, Illinois
- Coordinates: 41.7779°N 88.2087°W
- Owner: BNSF Railway
- Line: BNSF Chicago Subdivision
- Platforms: 2 side platforms
- Tracks: 3
- Connections: Pace buses

Construction
- Parking: Yes
- Cycle facilities: Yes
- Accessible: Yes

Other information
- Fare zone: 4

History
- Opened: July 16, 1989

Passengers
- October 2025: 3,260 (avg. weekday)
- Rank: 1 out of 236

Services
Preceding station	Metra	Following station
Aurora Terminus	BNSF	Naperville toward Union Station
Former services at Eola
Preceding station	Burlington Route	Following station
Aurora Terminus	Suburban Service	Naperville toward Chicago
Track layout
Location

Route 59 station is a Metra station along the BNSF Line on the border of Aurora, Illinois, and Naperville, Illinois. The station is located at, and named for, Illinois Route 59, to distinguish itself from Naperville to the east and Aurora to the west. It opened on July 16, 1989. As of October 2025, Route 59 is the busiest of Metra's 236 non-downtown stations, with an average of 3,260 weekday boardings.

As of September 8, 2025, Route 59 is served by 67 trains (32 inbound, 35 outbound) on weekdays, and by all 40 trains (20 in each direction) on weekends and holidays.

== Bus connections ==
Pace

- 559 Illinois Route 59

Greyhound Lines

- Chicago–Davenport, Iowa
