= Harlem Avenue station =

Commuter rail station in Berwyn, Illinois

Harlem Avenue

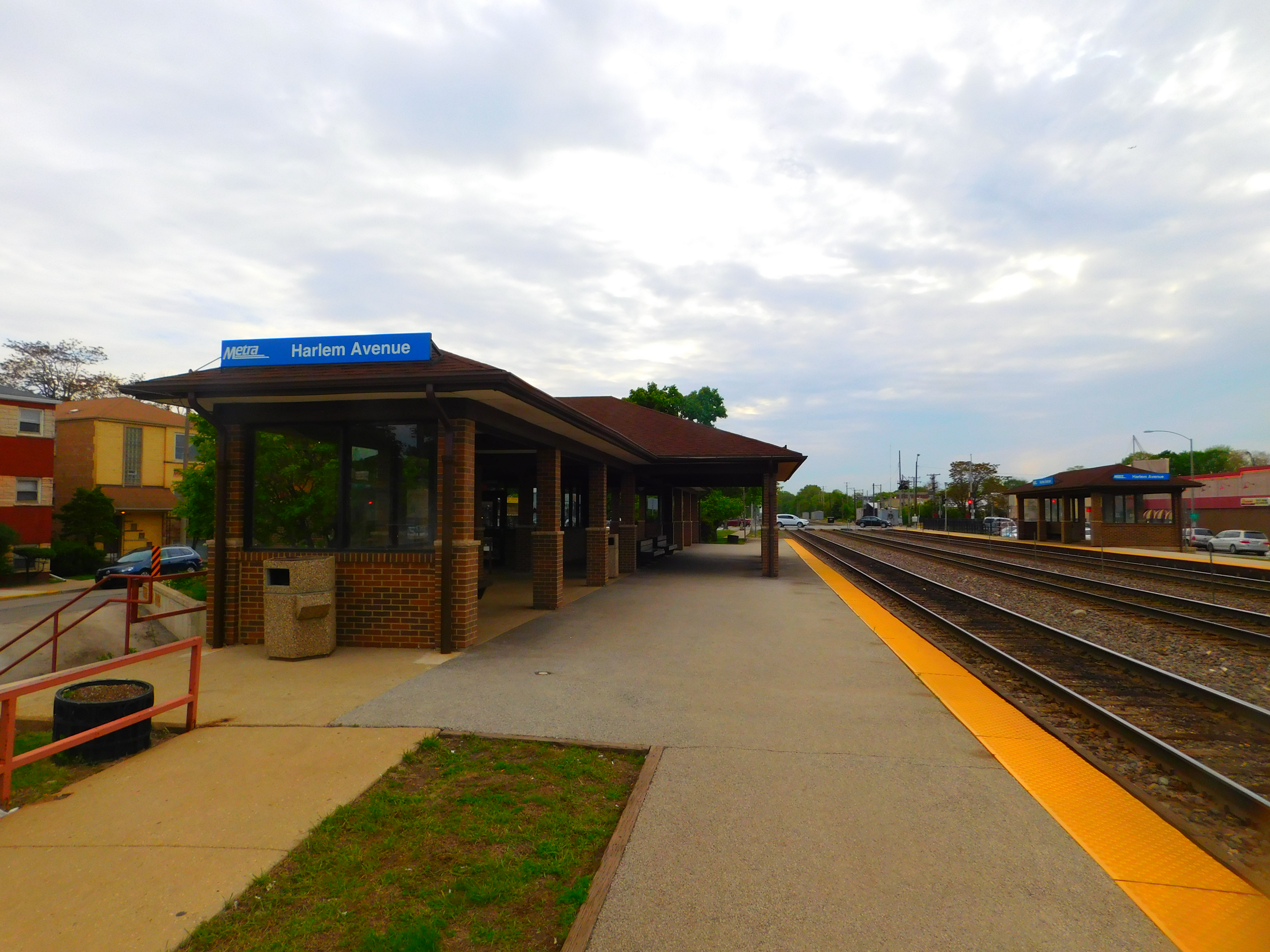

General information
- Location: 7135 Windsor Avenue; Berwyn, Illinois 60402
- Coordinates: 41.8313°N 87.8019°W
- Owner: Metra
- Line: BNSF Chicago Subdivision
- Platforms: 2 side platforms
- Tracks: 3
- Connections: Pace Buses

Construction
- Parking: Yes
- Accessible: Yes

Other information
- Fare zone: 2

History
- Opened: 1890

Passengers
- 2018: 451 (average weekday) ▲7.1%
- Rank: 106 out of 236

Services
| Preceding station | Metra | Following station |
|---|---|---|
| Riverside toward Aurora | BNSF | Berwyn toward Union Station |
Former services
| Preceding station | Burlington Route | Following station |
|---|---|---|
| Riverside toward Aurora | Suburban Service | Berwyn toward Chicago |
Track layout
Location

Harlem Avenue is one of three stations on Metra's BNSF Line in Berwyn, Illinois. The station is 10 miles (16.1 km) from Union Station, the east end of the line. In Metra's zone-based fare system, Harlem Avenue is in zone 2. As of 2018, Harlem Avenue is the 106th busiest of Metra's 236 non-downtown stations, with an average of 451 weekday boardings. A station building is on the south side of the three-track main.

According to the Dynamic Depot Maps website, Harlem Avenue station was originally built in 1890 by the Chicago, Burlington & Quincy Railroad.

As of September 8, 2025, Harlem Avenue is served by 51 trains (25 inbound, 26 outbound) on weekdays, and by 36 trains (18 in each direction) on weekends and holidays.

== Bus connections ==
Pace

- "Route 302 – Ogden / Stanley". PaceBus.com. Chicago: Pace Suburban Bus Service.
- "Route 307 – Harlem". PaceBus.com. Chicago: Pace Suburban Bus Service.
