= Clyde station (Illinois) =

Former commuter rail station in Cicero, Illinois

Clyde

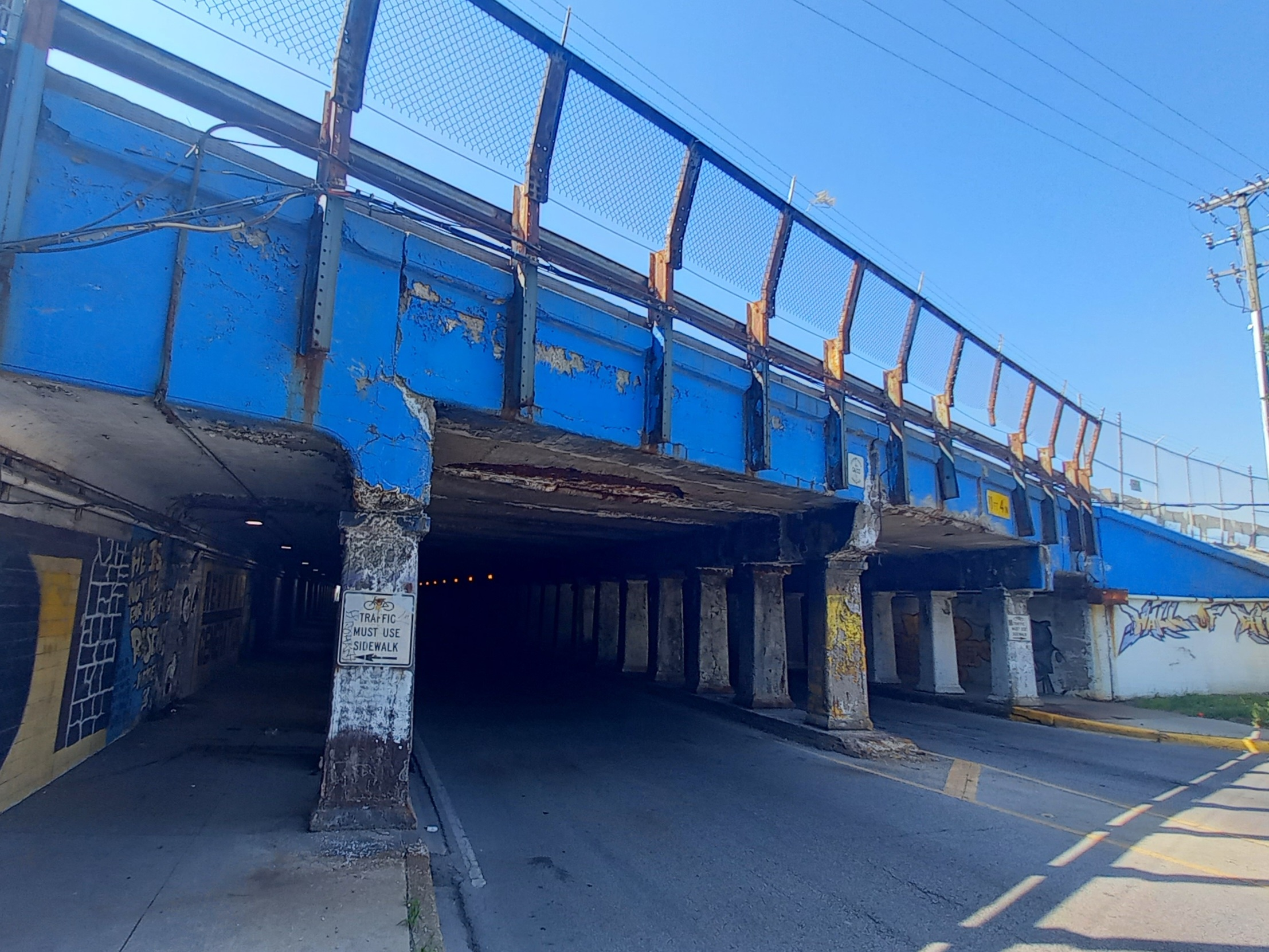
- Site of the former station at Austin Boulevard

General information
- Location: 29th and Austin Boulevard, Cicero, Illinois 60804
- Coordinates: 41.8384°N 87.7729°W
- Owner: Metra
- Platforms: 2 side platforms
- Tracks: 3 tracks

Other information
- Fare zone: B

History
- Opened: 1978
- Closed: April 1, 2007

Former services
Preceding station	Burlington Route	Following station
La Vergne toward Aurora	Suburban Service	Morton Park toward Chicago
Preceding station	Metra	Following station
LaVergne toward Aurora	BNSF	Cicero toward Union Station
Location

Clyde was a station on Metra's BNSF Line. The station was located at 29th Street and Austin Boulevard, in Cicero, Illinois. Clyde was 8.5 miles (13.7 km) from Union Station, the eastern terminus of the BNSF Line. In Metra's zone-based fare system, Clyde was located in zone B, on the west end of the Cicero Railroad Yard. Clyde closed on April 1, 2007, due to low ridership; to compensate for the loss of the station, Metra announced that it would rehabilitate the adjacent Cicero and LaVergne stations.

Ridership was only 64 passengers on an average weekday around the time of the station's closure.
