= BNSF Line =

Commuter rail service in the Chicago area

- Metra trains at Riverside station, each pushed by an EMD F40PH-3 locomotive

Overview
- Owner: BNSF Railway (Leased to Metra)
- Termini: Union Station; Aurora
- Stations: 26
- Website: metra.com/train-lines/bnsf

Service
- Type: Commuter rail
- System: Metra
- Operator(s): BNSF Railway; Metra
- Rolling stock: EMD F40PH/F40PHM-3 locomotives Gallery Cars
- Daily ridership: 63,000 (average weekday 2018)
- Ridership: 7,575,111

Technical
- Line length: 37.5 miles (60.4 km)
- Num of tracks: 2 (at Aurora station); 3 (Aurora–LaVergne); 4 (LaVergne–Union Station)
- Track gauge: 4 ft 8 1/2 in (1,435 mm) standard gauge
- Operating speed: Up to 70 miles per hour (110 km/h)
Route map
BNSF Line highlighted in green
Key
- Mileage source All stations are accessible except Halsted Street, Western Avenue, and Congress Park.

The BNSF Line is a Metra commuter rail line operated by the BNSF Railway in Chicago, Illinois and its western suburbs, running from Chicago Union Station to Aurora, Illinois through the Chicago Subdivision. In 2010, the BNSF Line continued to have the highest weekday ridership (average 64,600) of the 11 Metra lines. While Metra does not refer to its lines by particular colors, the BNSF line's color on Metra timetables is "Cascade Green," in honor of the Burlington Northern Railroad.

As of September 8, 2025, the public timetable shows 97 trains (47 inbound, 50 outbound) on the BNSF Line on weekdays. Of these, 32 inbound trains originate from Aurora, two from Lisle, one from Downers Grove Main Street, 10 from Fairview Avenue, and two from Brookfield. Five outbound trains terminate at Brookfield, seven at Fairview Avenue, three at Naperville, and the rest at Aurora. Weekend and holiday service consists of 40 trains (20 in each direction), with all trains traveling between Union Station and Aurora.

The line is operated by BNSF under a "purchase of service agreement" with Metra, inherited from Burlington Northern. While Metra owns all rolling stock, the management and crews are BNSF employees. BNSF is the owner of the right-of-way, controls the line and handles dispatching from corporate headquarters in Fort Worth, Texas. Metra imposes a 70 mph maximum allowed speed for passenger trains. The BNSF Line is the only remaining Metra commuter line that operates via a purchase-of-service agreement since the Union Pacific Railroad transferred the operations and supplying of commuter trains to Metra for the routes originating from the Ogilvie Transportation Center in 2025.

== History ==
The railroad between Chicago and Aurora was constructed in 1864 by the Chicago and Aurora Railroad, which evolved into the Chicago, Burlington and Quincy Railroad. The CB&Q operated the commuter service until the railroad merged into the Burlington Northern Railroad in 1970. Burlington Northern merged with the Atchison, Topeka and Santa Fe Railway in 1995 to form the Burlington Northern Santa Fe Railway, which would later rename itself to BNSF Railway.

When the Regional Transportation Authority (RTA) began subsidizing Chicago's commuter rail operations in 1974, Burlington Northern continued to operate its line under contract to the RTA. This arrangement continued when the RTA organized its commuter rail lines under the RTA Commuter Rail Division in 1983, later rebranded as Metra in 1985.

Today, the triple-track line is one of the busiest rail corridors in the United States. In addition to the 97 Metra trains that currently use the line, BNSF freight trains frequent the line at all hours. Amtrak's Southwest Chief, California Zephyr, and Illinois Zephyr and Carl Sandburg use the line as well, making an intermediate stop at Naperville. The Illinois Zephyr and Carl Sandburg services also stop at La Grange Road. Rail fans have coined the line as the "BNSF Racetrack".

The Clyde station at South Austin Boulevard and West 29th Street in Cicero was closed on April 1, 2007, due to low ridership and its dilapidation. In the months before its closure, it was used by about 50 passengers a day.

=== Kendall County extension ===
There have been proposals to extend service west into Kendall County, which as of 2020 is outside the RTA's service area. Potential new stations would be built in Montgomery, Oswego, Yorkville, Plano, and Sandwich, Illinois. The Plano station would be located over 1 mile west of the CB&Q Depot currently used by Amtrak's Illinois Zephyr and Carl Sandburg trains.

== Ridership ==
Between 2014 and 2019, annual ridership declined 7% from 16.7 million to 15.5 million passengers. Due to the COVID-19 pandemic, ridership dropped to 3,659,617 passengers in 2020. The line's 7,575,111 riders in 2025 made it the busiest Metra line.

== Rolling stock ==
The BNSF Line's locomotive fleet consists of the EMD F40PH-3 and the EMD F40PHM-3. Until 2012, some MPI MP36PH-3S locomotives (401–405) also operated on the line; however, they were reassigned to the Milwaukee lines and the North Central Service due to operating difficulties. Passenger cars include Gallery Cars from Pullman (Bike Car), Budd, Morrison-Knudsen/Amerail, and Nippon Sharyo.

== Stations ==
County	Zone	Location	Station	Connections and notes
Cook	1	Chicago	Union Station	Amtrak (long-distance): California Zephyr, Cardinal, City of New Orleans, Empire Builder, Floridian, Lake Shore Limited, Southwest Chief, Texas Eagle; Amtrak (intercity): Blue Water, Borealis, Hiawatha, Illini and Saluki, Illinois Zephyr and Carl Sandburg, Lincoln Service, Pere Marquette, Wolverine; Metra: Milwaukee District North, Milwaukee District West, North Central Service, Heritage Corridor, SouthWest Service; Chicago "L": Blue (at Clinton), Brown Orange Pink Purple (at Quincy); CTA buses: 1 7 J14 19 28 56 60 120 121 124 125 126 128 130 151 156 157 192; Pace: 755; Amtrak Thruway: Chicago–Madison and Chicago–Rockford (Van Galder), Chicago–Louisville (Greyhound)
Cook	2	Chicago	Halsted Street	CTA buses: 8 18 N62
Cook	2	Chicago	Western Avenue	Chicago "L": Pink (at Western); CTA buses: 18 49 X49
Cook	2	Cicero	Cicero	CTA buses: 35 54 54B 60
Cook	2	Cicero	Morton Park	Closed between 1938 and 1957
Cook	2	Cicero	Clyde	Closed April 1, 2007
Cook	2	Berwyn	LaVergne (rush only)	Pace: 302, 314
Cook	2	Berwyn	Berwyn	Pace: 302, 311
Cook	2	Berwyn	Harlem Avenue	Pace: 302, 307
Cook	2	Riverside	Riverside	
Cook	2	Brookfield	Hollywood	
Cook	2	Brookfield	Brookfield	Pace: 331
Cook	3	Brookfield	Congress Park (rush only)	Pace: 302, 331
Cook	3	La Grange	LaGrange Road	Amtrak: Illinois Zephyr and Carl Sandburg; Pace: 302, 330, 331
Cook	3	La Grange	Stone Avenue/LaGrange (rush only)	
Cook	3	Western Springs	Western Springs	
DuPage	3	Hinsdale	Highlands (rush only)	
DuPage	3	Hinsdale	Hinsdale	
DuPage	3	Hinsdale	West Hinsdale (rush only)	
DuPage	3	Clarendon Hills	Clarendon Hills	
DuPage	3	Westmont	Westmont	Pace: 715
DuPage	3	Downers Grove	Fairview Avenue/Downers Grove	
DuPage	4	Downers Grove	Main Street/Downers Grove	Pace: 834
DuPage	4	Downers Grove	Belmont	Grove Commuter Shuttle: West Route
DuPage	4	Lisle	Lisle	
DuPage	4	Naperville	Naperville	Amtrak: California Zephyr, Illinois Zephyr and Carl Sandburg, Southwest Chief; Pace: 530, 714, 722; Burlington Trailways: Chicago–Davenport
DuPage	4	Naperville/ Aurora	Route 59	Pace: 559; Greyhound Lines: Chicago–Davenport
DuPage	4	Eola	Eola	Closed to passengers prior to 1971, closed entirely later
Kane	4	Aurora		
Kane	4	Aurora	Scraper Works	Closed 1974
Kane	4	Aurora	Aurora	Pace: 524, 530, 533, 540, 802
Kane		Aurora	Aurora (CB&Q Depot)	Closed 1986
