= Chicago Subdivision =

Railroad line in Illinois, United States

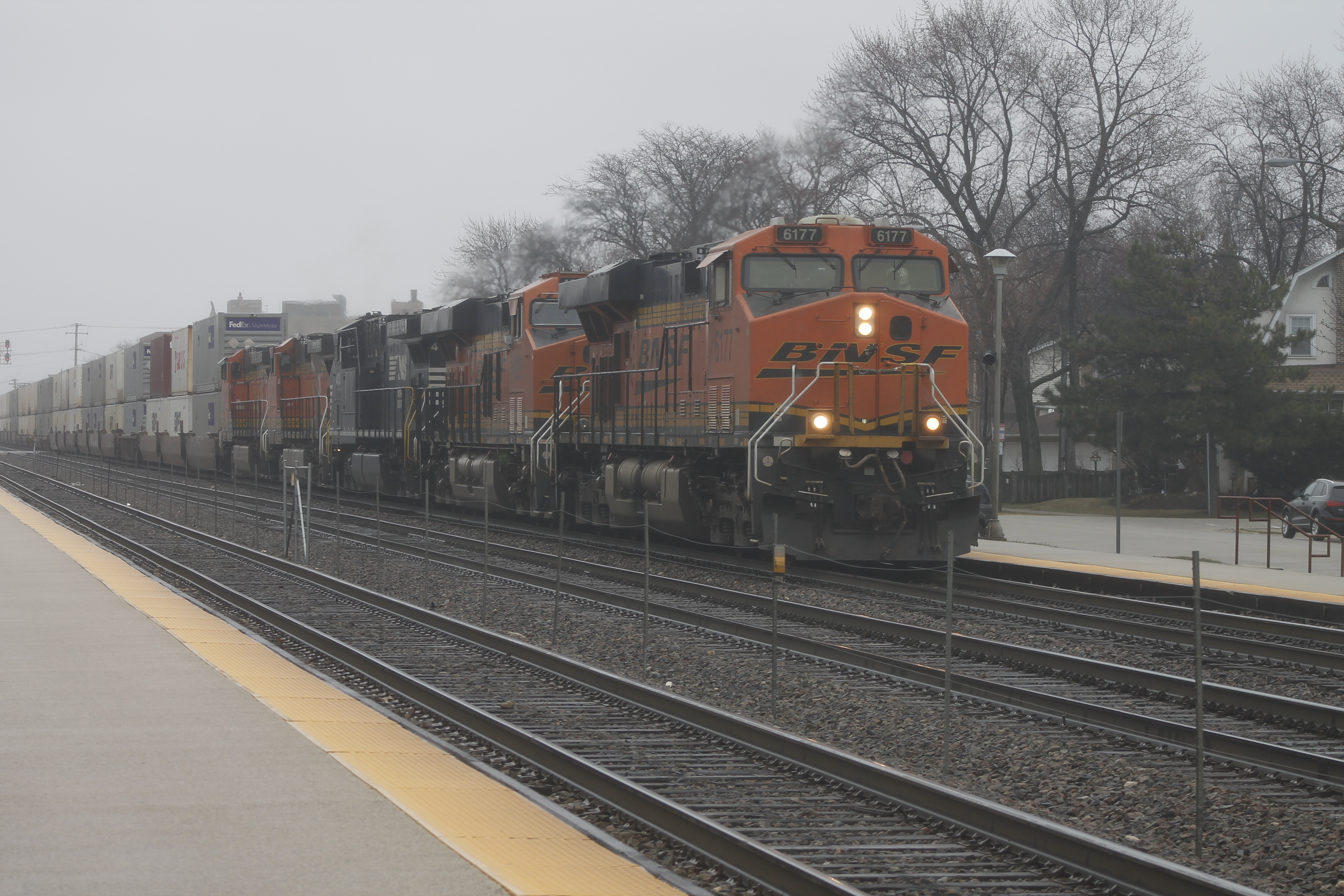
- BNSF ES44AC No. 6177 leads on the Chicago Subdivision at Harlem Avenue station

Overview
- Owner: BNSF Railway
- Locale: Chicago metropolitan area
- Termini: Chicago; Aurora
- Continues from: Aurora Subdivision
- Continues as: C&M Subdivision
- Stations: 27

Service
- Type: Commuter rail; Freight rail; Inter-city rail
- System: Northern Transcon
- Operator(s): BNSF Railway; Metra; Amtrak

Technical
- Line length: 38 mi (61 km)
- Number of tracks: 3–4
- Track gauge: 1,435 mm (4 ft 8 1/2 in) standard gauge
- Operating speed: 70 mph (110 km/h)
- Train protection system: PTC

The Chicago Subdivision or Chicago Sub is a railroad line in Illinois that runs about 38 miles (61 km) from Chicago to Aurora and hosts Metra's BNSF Line commuter service. It is operated by BNSF Railway as the easternmost part of the railroad's Northern Transcon to Seattle, Washington. This line is colloquially known as The Racetrack because it is mostly triple-tracked and supports fairly fast trains. It had been operated by a BNSF ancestor, the Chicago, Burlington and Quincy Railroad, which introduced high-speed Zephyr passenger trains in 1934 and ran many of them along this subdivision from Chicago to points west.

The Chicago Subdivision meets the Aurora Subdivision and Mendota Subdivision in Aurora. Commuter service ends at the Aurora Transportation Center, though Amtrak trains continue southwest on the Mendota Subdivision. Triple-tracking runs from where track leading to the Aurora station and Metra Yard joins the subdivision eastward to Cicero, where multiple tracks from a yard join. It is then quadruple-tracked for the rest of the way until the turn to Union Station. As of 2025 weekday traffic on the subdivision was 97 Metra commuter trains, eight Amtrak intercity trains, and 60 BNSF freight trains.

After the introduction of the CB&Q Zephyrs, train speeds increased significantly around the country for the next decade or so, but the Naperville train disaster along these tracks in 1946 was one event that contributed to the federal government restricting speeds in later years. Trains that had once traveled at or above 100 miles per hour (160 km/h) were soon restricted to a maximum of 79 miles per hour (127 km/h). Much of this line has a speed limit of 70 miles per hour (110 km/h) for passenger trains, while freight trains run slower.

== Passenger Services ==
- Metra
  - BNSF Line
- Amtrak
  - California Zephyr
  - Southwest Chief
  - Illinois Zephyr and Carl Sandburg
