= Aurora Transportation Center =

Commuter rail station in Aurora, Illinois

Aurora

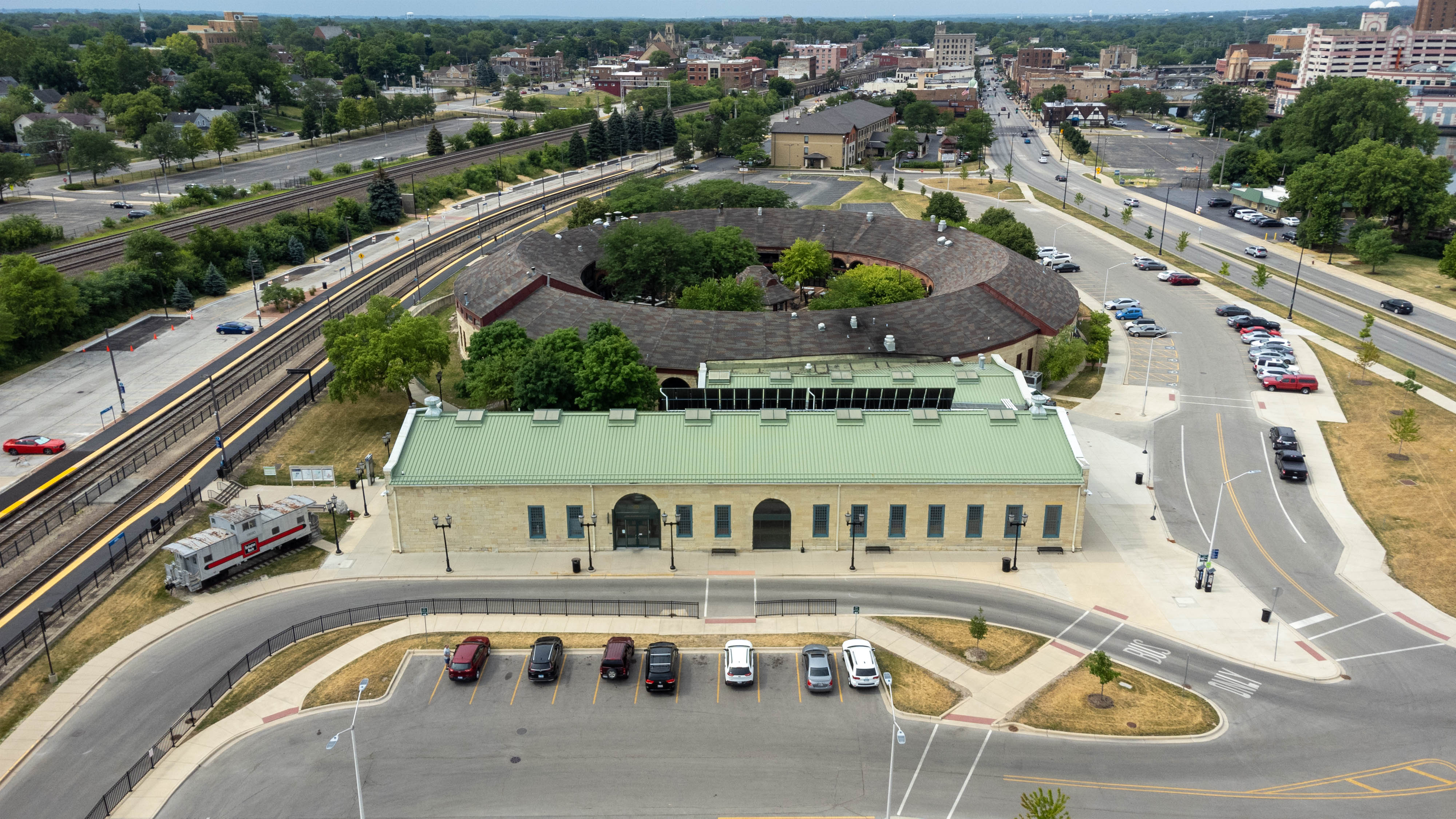
- The transportation center in 2022, with the station tracks to the left

General information
- Location: 233 North Broadway; Aurora, Illinois
- Coordinates: 41.7613°N 88.3081°W
- Owner: City of Aurora
- Line: BNSF Chicago Subdivision
- Platforms: 2 side platforms
- Tracks: 2
- Connections: Pace Buses

Construction
- Accessible: Yes

Other information
- Fare zone: 4

History
- Opened: 1986

Passengers
- October 2025: 1,280 (average weekday)
- Rank: 9 out of 236

Services
Preceding station	Metra	Following station
Terminus	BNSF	Route 59 toward Union Station
Former services at old station
Preceding station	Amtrak	Following station
Galesburg toward Oakland	San Francisco Zephyr Until 1983	Chicago Terminus
Galesburg toward Los Angeles	Desert Wind Until 1983	Chicago Terminus
Plano toward Quincy	Illinois Zephyr Until 1983	La Grange Road toward Chicago
Preceding station	Burlington Route	Following station
Bristol toward Denver	Main Line	La Grange toward Chicago
Mendota toward Oakland	California Zephyr	Chicago Terminus
Sugar Grove toward Minneapolis	Minneapolis – Chicago	La Grange toward Chicago
Terminus	Suburban Service	Scraper Works toward Chicago
Montgomery toward Streator	Aurora – Streator	Terminus
South Aurora toward West Batavia	Aurora – West Bativia	Terminus
Terminus	Aurora – West Chicago	North Aurora toward West Chicago
Track layout
Location

The Aurora Transportation Center is a station on Metra's BNSF Line in Aurora, Illinois. The station is 37.1 miles (59.7 km) from Union Station, the east end of the line. In Metra's zone-based fare system, Aurora is in zone 4. As of October 2025, Aurora is the 9th busiest of Metra's 236 non-downtown stations, with an average of 1,280 weekday boardings. There is a staffed station building. Just north of the station is the Hill Yard, a large coach yard used to store the Metra trains on the BNSF Line. Aurora is a stub-track terminal, which means the Metra tracks end here. Amtrak and BNSF freights use the two tracks east of the station.

Aurora is the west end of the BNSF Line and is served by numerous Pace bus routes. It served as a Greyhound bus stop until September 7, 2011.

As of September 8, 2025, Aurora is served by 67 trains (32 inbound, 35 outbound) on weekdays, and by all 40 trains (20 in each direction) on weekends and holidays.

== History ==
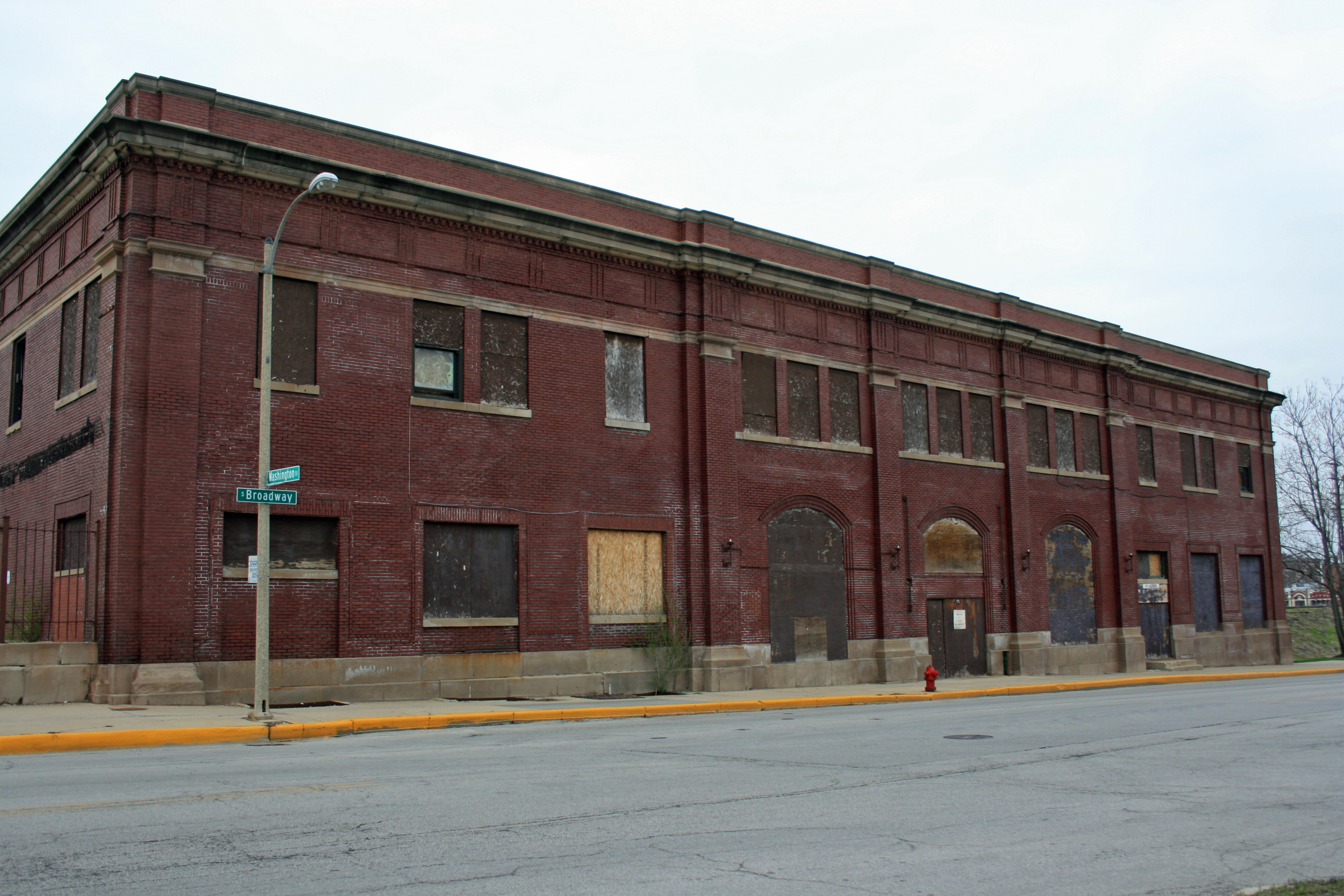
The old and now demolished CB&Q Station seen on May 1, 2008

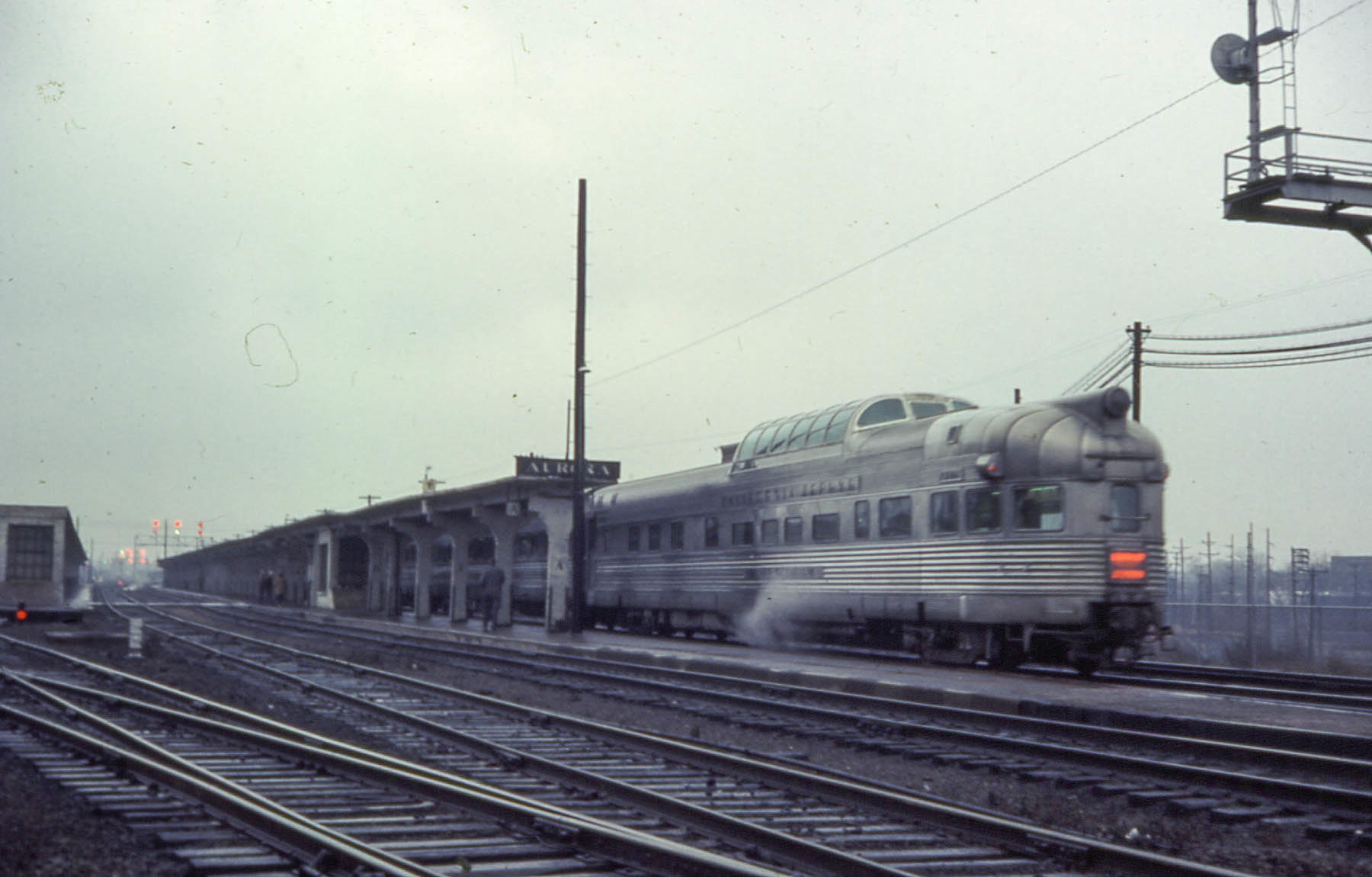
California Zephyr at Aurora station in 1967

The station replaced the former Aurora Depot, at the corners of South Broadway and Washington Street. The station was constructed in 1922 by the Chicago, Burlington and Quincy Railroad and closed in 1986. It was also served by Amtrak and Metra trains until the opening of the Aurora Transportation Center. The building was torn down in April 2013. Amtrak service shifted to Naperville station, and continues to stop there presently.

== Bus connections ==
Pace

- 524 West Aurora
- 530 West Galena/Naperville
- 533 Northeast Aurora
- 802 Aurora/Geneva via Lake
