= History of African Americans in Chicago =

Black Chicagoans
- African American population by census tract as of 2020

Total population
- 757,971 (2021, est.)

Regions with significant populations
- Southside Chicago, Westside Chicago, South Suburbs

Religion
- Christianity (Mainly Historically Black Protestant and Catholicism), Islam, Irreligion

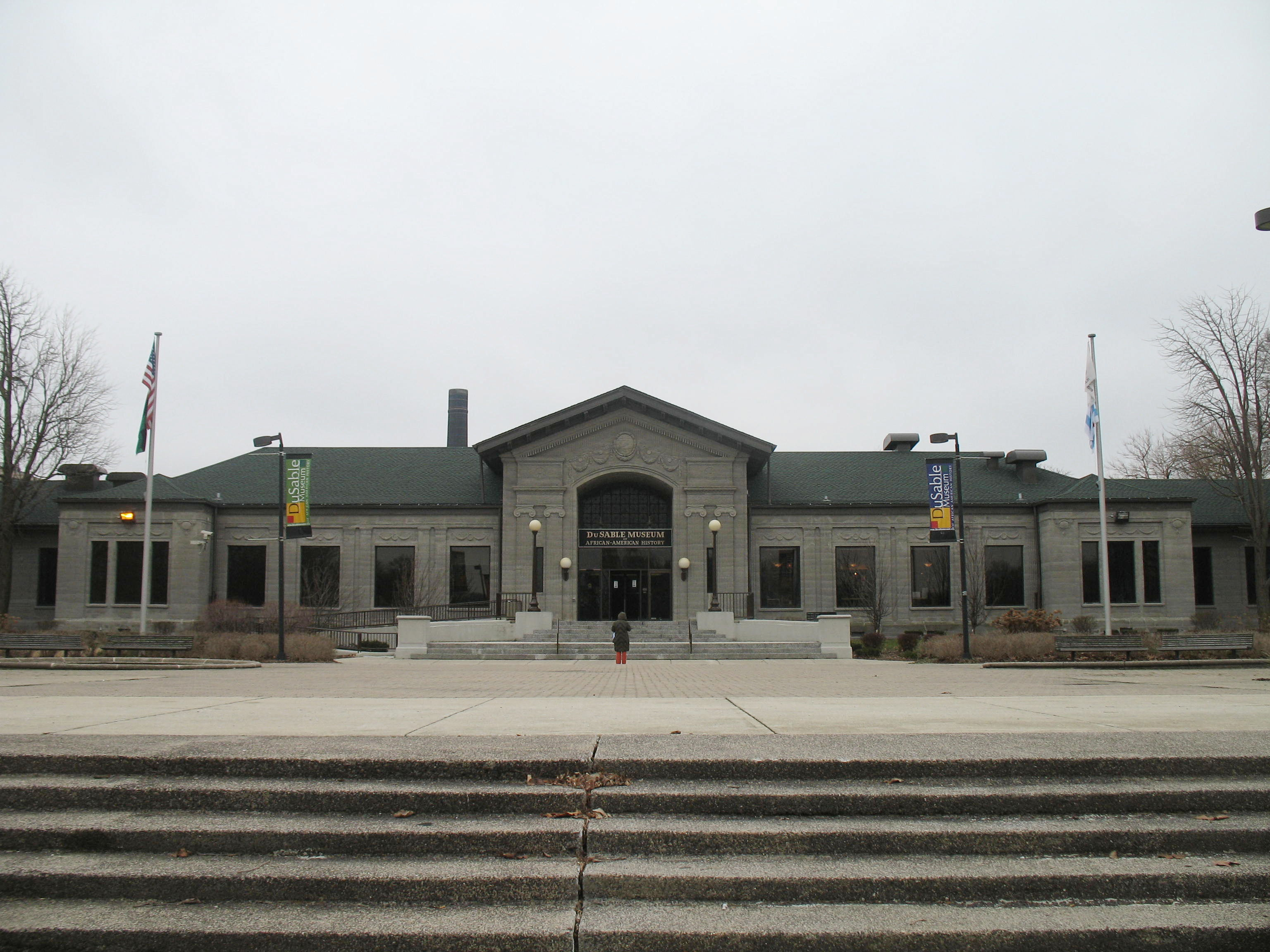
DuSable Museum of African American History in Chicago's Washington Park

The history of African Americans in Chicago or Black Chicagoans dates back to Jean Baptiste Point du Sable's trading activities in the 1780s. Du Sable, the city's founder, was Haitian of African and French descent. Fugitive slaves and freedmen established the city's first Black community in the 1840s. By the late 19th century, the first black person had been elected to office.

The Great Migration from 1910 to 1970 brought hundreds of thousands of black Americans from the South to Chicago, where they became an urban population. Most Black migrants to Chicago came from Mississippi and Louisiana, drawn in large part by opportunity in the meat-packing and manufacturing industries as well as ease of access to the city via the Illinois Central Railroad. There they created churches, community organizations, businesses, music, and literature. African Americans of all classes built a community on the South Side of Chicago for decades before the Civil Rights Movement, as well as on the West Side of Chicago. Residing in segregated communities, almost regardless of income, the black residents of Chicago aimed to create communities where they could survive, sustain themselves, and have the ability to determine for themselves their own course in the History of Chicago.

According to the U.S. Census Bureau, African Americans accounted for 29% of the city's population, or approximately 800,000 people as of the 2020 census. As per 2023 Census estimates the metro area had just under 1.5 million residents claiming Black alone ancestry, making it the metropolitan area with the fourth-highest Black population after New York, Atlanta, and Washington DC.

After peaking in 1980, the Black population in Chicago is now shrinking, with commonly cited factors including the demolition of public housing, mass closures within the Chicago Public Schools system, health care and food deserts, as well as high unemployment rates. In contrast to the previous century where relatively narrower wage and unemployment gaps attracted Black residents, levels of racial inequality both within Chicago and in relation to other cities have increased for Black residents since the 1990s.

Most Blacks leaving Chicago and Cook County remain within the Chicago region, including in the surrounding collar counties, or in cities such as Hammond and Gary in neighboring Indiana. That said, many Black Chicagoans have also moved further to Southern cities such as Atlanta, Charlotte, Dallas, Houston, and San Antonio.

Chicago also has a foreign-born Black population. Many of the African immigrants in Chicago are from Ethiopia and Nigeria.

== History ==
=== Beginnings ===
Jean Baptiste Point du Sable was a Haitian of French and African descent.

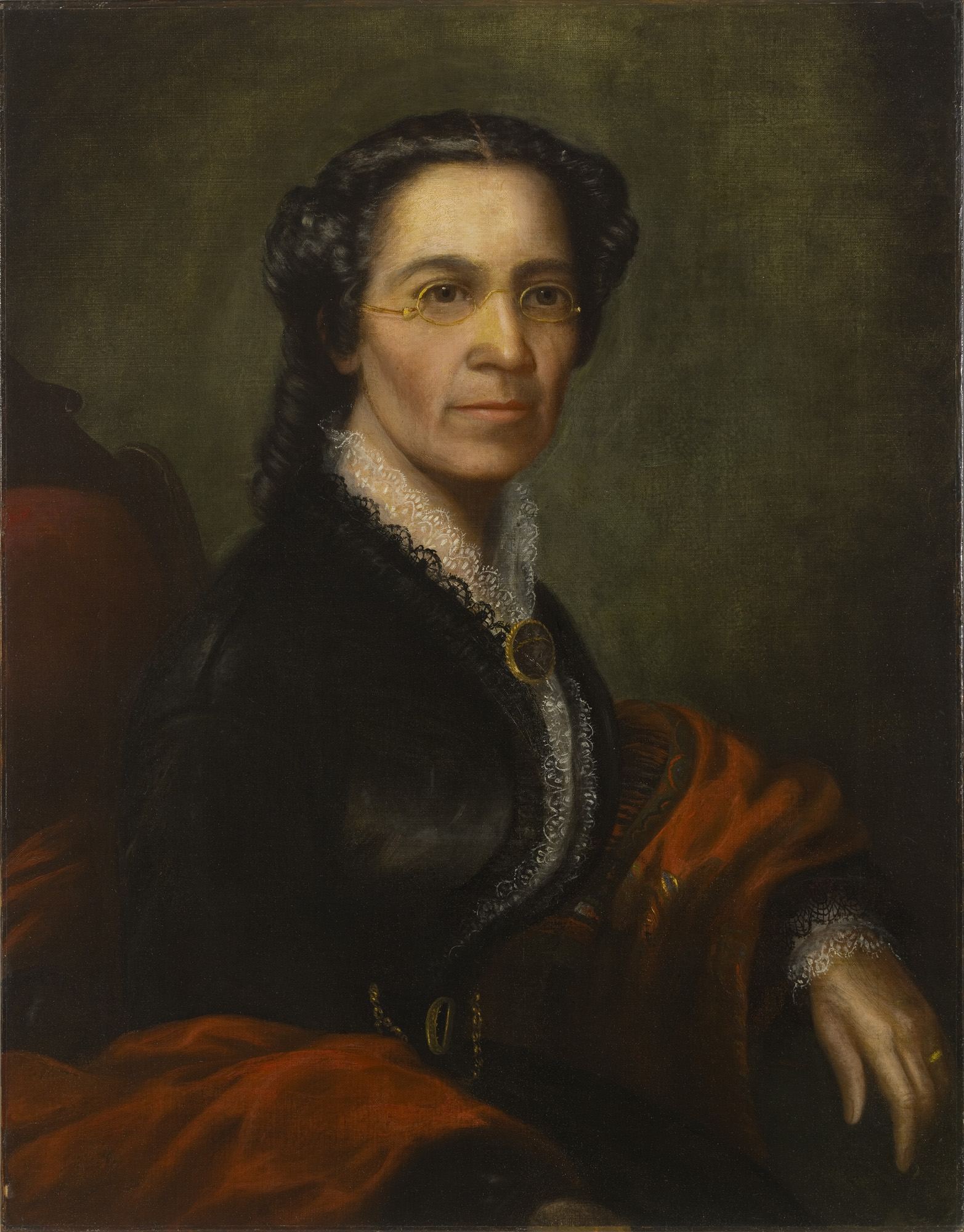
Mary Richardson Jones, a prominent member of Chicago's Black community, in 1865

Although du Sable's settlement was established in the 1780s, African Americans would only become established as a community in the 1840s, with the population reaching 1,000 by 1860. Much of this population consisted of escaped slaves from the Upper South. Following the end of Reconstruction in 1877, African Americans flowed from the Deep South into Chicago, raising the population from approximately 4,000 in 1870 to 15,000 in 1890.

In 1853, John A. Logan helped pass a law to prohibit all African Americans, including freedmen, from settling in the state. However, in 1865, the state repealed its "Black Laws" and became the first to ratify the 13th Amendment, partly due to the efforts of John and Mary Jones, a prominent and wealthy activist couple.

Especially after the Civil War, Illinois had some of the most progressive anti-discrimination legislation in the nation. School segregation was first outlawed in 1874, and segregation in public accommodations was first outlawed in 1885. In 1870, Illinois extended voting rights to African-American men for the first time, and in 1871, John Jones, a tailor and Underground Railroad station manager who successfully lobbied for the repeal of the state's black laws, became the first African-American elected official in the state, serving as a member of the Cook County Commission. By 1879, John W. E. Thomas of Chicago became the first African American elected to the Illinois General Assembly, beginning the longest uninterrupted run of African-American representation in any state legislature in U.S. history. After the Great Chicago Fire, Chicago mayor Joseph Medill appointed the city's first black fire company of nine men and the first black police officer.

=== Great Migration ===
Chicago was the "Promised Land" to Black Southerners. 500,000 African Americans moved to Chicago.

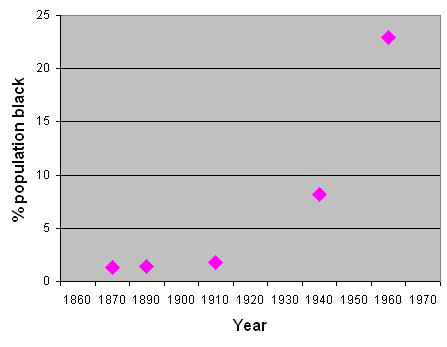
The Black population in Chicago significantly increased in the early to mid-1900s, due to the Great Migration out of the South. While African Americans made up less than two percent of the city's population in 1910, by 1960 the city was nearly 25 percent Black.

As the 20th century began, southern states succeeded in passing new constitutions and laws that disfranchised most blacks and many poor Whites. Deprived of the right to vote, they could not sit on juries or run for office. They were subject to discriminatory laws passed by White legislators, including racial segregation of public facilities. Segregated education for black children and other services were consistently underfunded in a poor, agricultural economy. As White-dominated legislatures passed Jim Crow laws to re-establish white favorability and create more restrictions in public life, violence against blacks increased. In addition, the boll weevil infestation ruined much of the cotton industry. Voting with their feet, blacks started migrating out of the South to the North, where they could live more freely, get their children educated, and get new jobs.

Industry buildup for World War I pulled thousands of workers to the North, as did the rapid expansion of railroads, and the meatpacking and steel industries. Between 1915 and 1960, hundreds of thousands of black southerners migrated to Chicago to escape violence and segregation, and to seek economic freedom. They went from being a mostly rural population to one that was mostly urban. "The migration of African Americans from the rural south to the urban north became a mass movement." The Great Migration radically transformed Chicago, both politically and culturally.

From 1910 to 1940, most African Americans who migrated north were from rural areas. They had been chiefly sharecroppers and laborers, although some were landowners pushed out by the boll weevil disaster. After years of underfunding of public education for blacks in the South, they tended to be poorly educated, with relatively low skills to apply to urban jobs. Like the European rural immigrants, they had to rapidly adapt to a different urban culture. Many took advantage of better schooling in Chicago and their children learned quickly. After 1940, when the second larger wave of migration started, blacks migrants tended to be already urbanized, from southern cities and towns. They were the most ambitious, better educated with more urban skills to apply in their new homes.

The masses of new migrants arriving in the cities captured public attention. At one point in the 1940s, 3,000 African Americans were arriving every week in Chicago—stepping off the trains from the South and making their ways to neighborhoods they had learned about from friends and the Chicago Defender - at the time the nation's most influential Black weekly newspaper, with more than two thirds of its readership base located outside of Chicago. The Great Migration was charted and evaluated. Urban White northerners started to get worried, as their neighborhoods rapidly changed. At the same time, recent and older ethnic immigrants competed for jobs and housing with the new arrivals, especially on the South Side, where the steel and meatpacking industries had the most numerous working-class jobs.

With Chicago's industries steadily expanding, opportunities opened up for new migrants, including Southerners, to find work. The railroad and meatpacking industries recruited black workers. Chicago's African-American newspaper, the Chicago Defender, made the city well known to southerners. It sent bundles of papers south on the Illinois Central trains, and African-American Pullman Porters would drop them off in black towns. "Chicago was the most accessible northern city for African Americans in Mississippi, Louisiana, Texas, and Arkansas." They took the trains north. "Then between 1916 and 1919, 50,000 Blacks came to crowd into the burgeoning black belt, to make new demands upon the institutional structure of the South Side."

==== 1919 race riot ====
The Chicago race riot of 1919 was a violent racial conflict with White Americans against black Americans that began on the South Side on July 27 and ended on August 3, 1919. During the riot, 38 people died (23 Black and 15 White). Over the week, injuries attributed to the episodic confrontations stood at 537, with two thirds of the injured being black and one third White, and approximately 1,000 to 2,000, most of whom were black, lost their homes. Due to its sustained violence and widespread economic impact, it is considered the worst of the scores of riots and civil disturbances across the nation during the "Red Summer" of 1919, so named because of the racial and labor violence and fatalities.

=== Segregation ===
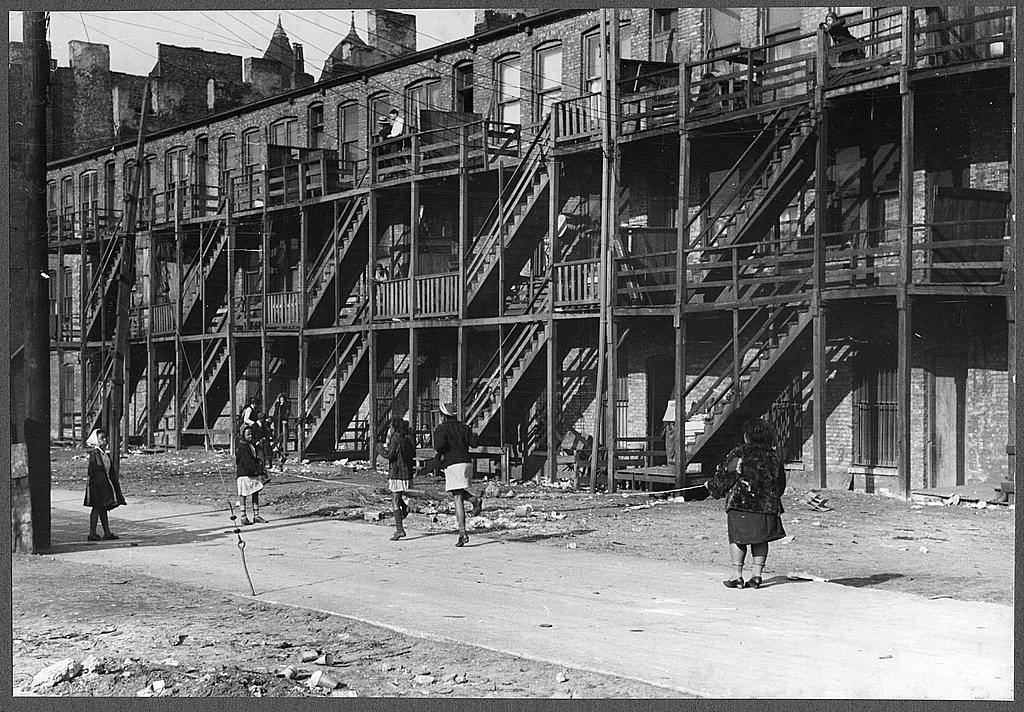
Chicago's Black Belt, April 1941

The increasingly large black population in Chicago (40,000 in 1910, and 278,000 in 1940) faced some of the same discrimination as they had in the South. It was hard for many blacks to find jobs and find decent places to live because of the competition for housing among different ethnic groups at a time when the city was expanding in population so dramatically. At the same time that blacks moved from the South in the Great Migration, Chicago had recently received hundreds of thousands of immigrants from southern and eastern Europe. The groups competed with each other for working-class wages.

Though other techniques to maintain housing segregation had been used, such as redlining and exclusive zoning to single-family housing, by 1927 the political leaders of Chicago began to adopt racially restrictive covenants. The Chicago Real Estate Board promoted a racially restrictive covenant to YMCAs, churches, women's clubs, parent teacher associations, Kiwanis clubs, chambers of commerce and property owners' associations. At one point, as much as 80% of the city's area was included under restrictive covenants.

The Supreme Court of the United States in Shelley v. Kraemer ruled in 1948 that racially restrictive covenants were unconstitutional, but this did not quickly solve blacks' problems with finding adequate housing. Homeowners' associations discouraged members from selling to other families, thus maintaining residential segregation. European immigrants and their descendants competed with African Americans for limited affordable housing, and those who didn't get the house lived on the streets.

In a succession common to most cities, many middle and upper-class Whites were the first to move out of the city to new housing, aided by new commuter rail lines and the construction of new highway systems. Later arrivals, ethnic Whites and African-American families occupied the older housing behind them. The White residents who had been in the city longest were the ones most likely to move to the newer, most expensive housing, as they could afford it. After 1945, the early White residents (many Irish immigrants and their descendants) on the South Side began to move away under pressure of new migrants and with newly expanding housing opportunities. African Americans continued to move into the area, which had become the black capital of the country. The South Side became predominantly Black, and the black belt was solidified.

== Social and economic conditions ==
=== Housing ===
Between 1900 and 1910, the African-American population rose rapidly in Chicago. White hostility and population growth combined to create the ghetto on the South Side. Nearby were areas dominated by ethnic Irish, who were especially territorial in defending against incursions into their areas by any other groups. Most of this large population was composed of migrants. In 1910 more than 75 percent of Blacks lived in predominantly black sections of the city. The eight or nine neighborhoods that had been set as areas of black settlement in 1900 remained the core of the Chicago African-American community. The black belt slowly expanded as African Americans, despite facing violence and restrictive covenants, pushed forward into new neighborhoods. As the population grew, African Americans became more confined to a delineated area, instead of spreading throughout the city. When blacks moved into mixed neighborhoods, ethnic White hostility grew. After fighting over the area, often Whites left the area to be dominated by Blacks. This is one of the reasons the black belt region started.

The black belt of Chicago was the chain of neighborhoods on the South Side of Chicago where three-quarters of the city's African-American population lived by the mid-20th century. In the early 1940s Whites within residential blocks formed "restrictive covenants" that served as legal contracts restricting individual owners from renting or selling to black people. The contracts limited the housing available to black tenants, leading to the accumulation of black residents within the blacks belt, one of the few neighborhoods open to black tenants. The black belt was an area that stretched 30 blocks along State Street on the South Side and was rarely more than seven blocks wide. With such a large population within this confined area, overcrowding often led to numerous families living in old and dilapidated buildings. The South Side's "black belt" also contained zones related to economic status. The poorest residents lived in the northernmost, oldest section of the black belt, while the elite resided in the southernmost section. In the mid-20th century, as African Americans across the United States struggled against the economic confines created by segregation, black residents within the black belt sought to create more economic opportunity in their community through the encouragement of local black businesses and entrepreneurs. During this time, Chicago was the capital of black America. Many African Americans who moved to the black area of Chicago were from the Southeastern region of the United States.

Immigration to Chicago was another pressure of overcrowding, as primarily lower-class newcomers from rural Europe also sought cheap housing and working class jobs. More and more people tried to fit into converted "kitchenette" and basement apartments. Living conditions in the black belt resembled conditions in the West Side ghetto or in the stockyards district. Although there were decent homes in the Negro sections, the core of the black belt was a slum. A 1934 census estimated that black households contained 6.8 people on average, whereas White households contained 4.7. Many blacks lived in apartments that lacked plumbing, with only one bathroom for each floor. With the buildings so overcrowded, building inspections and garbage collection were below the minimum mandatory requirements for healthy sanitation. This unhealthiness increased the threat of disease. From 1940 to 1960, the infant death rate in the Black Belt was 16% higher than the rest of the city.

Crime in African-American neighborhoods was a low priority to the police. Associated with problems of poverty and southern culture, rates of violence and homicide were high. Some women resorted to prostitution to survive. Both low life and middle-class strivers were concentrated in a small area.

In 1946, the Chicago Housing Authority (CHA) tried to ease the pressure in the overcrowded ghettos and proposed to put public housing sites in less congested areas in the city. The White residents did not take to this very well, so city politicians forced the CHA to keep the status quo and develop high rise projects in the black and on the West Side. Some of these became notorious failures. As industrial restructuring in the 1950s and later led to massive job losses, residents changed from working-class families to poor families on welfare.

As of May 2016 violence within some Chicago neighborhoods prompted black middle-class people to move to the suburbs.

=== Children ===
The demographics of the city were changing in the early 20th century as black southern families migrated out of the south, but while cities like Chicago empathized with the condition of impoverished white children, black children were mostly excluded from the private and religious institutions that provided homes for such children. Those that did take in black dependent children were overcrowded and underfunded because of institutional racism. Between 1899 and 1945 many of the city's black children found themselves in the juvenile court system. The 1899 Juvenile Court Act, supported by Progressive reformers, created a class of dependants for orphans and other children lacking "proper parental care or guardianship" but the court's designations of "delinquency" and "dependency" were racialized so black children were far more likely to be labeled as delinquents.

=== Culture ===
Between 1916 and 1920, almost 50,000 black Southerners moved to Chicago, which profoundly shaped the city's development. Growth increased even more rapidly after 1940. In particular, the new citizens caused the growth of local churches, businesses and community organizations. A new musical culture arose, fed by all the traditions along the Mississippi River. The population continued to increase with new migrants, with the most arriving after 1940.

The black arts community in Chicago was especially vibrant. Early Vaudeville performers and entrepreneurs like the Griffin Sisters created and managed venues for Black performers in the 1910s. The Pekin Theater, built in 1905, was called "The Cradle of Negro Drama in the United States." The 1920s were the height of the Jazz Age, but music continued as the heart of the community for decades. Nationally renowned musicians rose within the Chicago world. Along the Stroll, a bright-light district on State Street, jazz greats like Louis Armstrong, Duke Ellington, Cab Calloway, Bessie Smith and Ethel Waters headlined at nightspots including the Deluxe Cafe.

The literary creation of Black Chicago residents from 1925 to 1950 was also prolific, and the city's Black Renaissance rivaled that of the Harlem Renaissance. Prominent writers included Richard Wright (author of Native Son), Willard Motley, William Attaway, Frank Marshall Davis, St. Clair Drake, Horace R. Cayton, Jr., and Margaret Walker. Chicago was home to writer and poet Gwendolyn Brooks, known for her portrayals of Black working-class life in crowded tenements of Bronzeville. Lorraine Hansberry channeled the experience of her family's attempt to move into a racially-restricted neighborhood on the city's South Side, as well as the broader conditions in working-class Black Chicago, into the renowned play A Raisin in the Sun - the first play written by an African American woman to be produced on Broadway. These writers expressed the changes and conflicts Blacks found in urban life and the struggles of creating new worlds.

In Chicago, Black writers turned away from the folk traditions embraced by Harlem Renaissance writers, instead adopting a grittier, uncompromising style of "literary naturalism" to depict life in the urban ghetto. Furthermore, as compared with the Harlem Renaissance, the Chicago Black Renaissance blossomed without the involvement of well-known intellectuals such as W.E.B Du Bois and without the oftentimes heavy-handed role played by White entrepreneurs and benefactors. In that sense, the Chicago Black Renaissance was substantially more public-facing and approachable to the working class. Indeed, several artists from this area were significantly influenced by Marxist principles and infused their works with a sense of the class-consciousness that the Harlem Renaissance lacked. The classic Black Metropolis, written by St. Clair Drake and Horace R. Cayton, Jr., exemplified the style of the Chicago writers. Today it remains the most detailed portrayal of Black Chicago in the 1930s and 1940s.

From 2008 to the present, the West Side Historical Society under the guidance of Rickie P. Brown Sr. began to document the rich history of the West Side of Chicago. Their research provided proof of the Austin community having the largest population of Blacks in the city of Chicago. This proved that the largest population of Blacks are on its west side, when factoring in the Near West Side, North Lawndale, West Humboldt Park, Garfield Park, and Austin communities as well. Their efforts to build a museum on the west side and continuing to bring awareness to Juneteenth as a national holiday was rewarded with a proclamation in 2011 by Governor Pat Quinn.

Elizabeth Todd-Breland argues that Black education reformers in Chicago developed community-driven strategies from the 1960s onward to address systemic inequities, but these efforts collided with neoliberal reforms that prioritized privatization and corporate models, exposing enduring tensions between racial justice and market-based policies.

Black Christianity

Black churches in Chicago have had an outsized influence on Black American spirituality and worship nationally. Thomas Dorsey assembled the first gospel music choir, fusing traditional worship with "bluesy" rhythms, at Chicago's Ebenezer Missionary Baptist Church in 1931. The new genre quickly took on throughout Chicago's South Side (and Black America more broadly), helping to establish the careers of legendary singers such as Mahalia Jackson, Sallie Martin, and Dinah Washington, all of whom began singing gospel in Chicago,

Aside from music, Black Chicago churches also played a pivotal role as receiving stations for Southern migrants during the Great Migration, helping to provide job leads, housing connections, mutual aid, and social orientation. During and following the Civil Rights movement, Black churches further served as organizing hubs for fair housing campaigns, school desegregation efforts, and voter registration drives.

A background in ministry helped launch the political career of Reverend Jesse Jackson, who worked closely with Dr. Martin Luther King, Jr. to establish a frontline office for the Southern Christian Leadership Conference (SCLC) in Chicago. Under his leadership, the SCLC brought Operation Breadbasket to Chicago in 1966, targeting dairy businesses, bottlers, and supermarket chains with boycotts with the aim of creating jobs for African-Americans. Jackson later launched his own economic empowerment organization called Operation PUSH (People United to Save Humanity), now the Rainbow/PUSH Coalition, which continues to focus on grassroots advocacy today.

==== Nation of Islam ====
In the 1930s, the Nation of Islam (NOI) moved its headquarters to Chicago from Detroit. From their center on the South Side, Elijah Muhammad and his wife, Clara Muhammad, organized a new religious movement among Black Americans. Muhammad's message appealed to Black Chicagoans of the 1930s and 1940s who were disillusioned with traditional Protestantism and energized by his claim that African Americans would soon be restored to freedom. In 1960, Malcolm X, the organization's national spokesperson, founded the newspaper Mr. Muhammad Speaks, which for a while distributed more than 600,000 copies nationwide.

Black Hebrew Israelites

Chicago was historically home to a major organization within the Black Hebrew Israelite religious movement, which holds that African Americans are the direct descendants of the Hebrews in the Hebrew Bible. The African Hebrew Israelites in Israel originated in Chicago during the 1960s and are widely known for having moved from the United States to Israel (particularly Dimona) in the 1960s-1970s. In 1981, the initial group of migrants to Israel numbered around 1,200 to 1,500, with the majority of members arriving on tourist visas and remaining after their permits expired.

Black Hebrew Israelites maintain a visible presence in Chicago, though more radical portions of the movement have been designated as a hate group by the SPLC for anti-Semitic, anti-white, and anti-LGBTQ views.

==== Music ====
African Americans have played a significant role in shaping the Chicago hip-hop scene, particularly in the genre of Drill music. Notable black rappers from Chicago include Chief Keef, Polo G, and Lil Durk.

==== Cuisine ====
African Americans introduced soul food to Chicago.

=== Business ===
Chicago's Black entrepreneurial history stretches back to the city's origins. Jean Baptiste Point du Sable (c. 1745–1818), widely regarded as Chicago's first non-Native settler, was also its first entrepreneur, establishing a prosperous trading settlement on the north bank of the Chicago River that supplied goods across the Great Lakes region. In the nineteenth century, John Jones arrived in Chicago in 1845 as a self-taught tailor and built one of the city's most successful businesses, becoming one of the wealthiest African Americans in the country. Jones also led the campaign to repeal Illinois's restrictive Black Codes in 1865 and in 1871 became the first African American elected to public office in the state, winning a seat on the Cook County Board of Commissioners.

Anthony Overton relocated his Overton Hygienic Manufacturing Company from Kansas City to Chicago in 1911 and expanded it into a diversified enterprise headquartered in his purpose-built South State Street building, encompassing cosmetics, banking, insurance, and newspaper publishing. He became the first African American to head a major business conglomerate and, in 1927, the first businessman to receive the Spingarn Medal from the NAACP.

Chicago's Black population developed a class structure, composed of a large number of domestic workers and other manual laborers, along with a small, but growing, contingent of middle-and-upper-class business and professional elites. In 1929, Black Chicagoans gained access to city jobs, and expanded their professional class. Fighting job discrimination was a constant battle for African Americans in Chicago, as foremen in various companies restricted the advancement of Black workers, which often kept them from earning higher wages. In the mid-20th century, Blacks began slowly moving up to better positions in the work force.

The migration expanded the market for African-American business. According to Allen Spear, "The most notable breakthrough in Black business came in the insurance field." There were four major Black insurance companies founded in Chicago. Additionally, the African-American market on State Street during this time consisted of barber shops, restaurants, pool rooms, saloons, and beauty salons. African Americans used these trades to build their own communities. These shops gave the Blacks a chance to establish their families, earn money, and become an active part of the community.

Widely credited as Chicago's first Black banker, Jesse Binga came to Chicago as a Pullman porter before opening the city's first Black bank, Binga Bank, in 1908 and amassing significant wealth. Binga would go on to spearhead an integration campaign on the South Side that put him at odds with the White establishment, with some even attributing the lethal damage of the 1919 race riots in part to the radical aversion to his efforts.

== Politics ==
President Barack Obama in 2012

With a growing base and strong leadership in machine politics, Blacks began to win elective office in local and state government. The first Blacks had been elected to office in Chicago in the late 19th century, decades before the Great Migrations. Chicago elected the first post-Reconstruction African-American member of Congress. He was Republican Oscar Stanton De Priest, in Illinois's 1st congressional district (1929–1935). The district has continuously elected African-Americans to the office ever since. The Chicago area has elected 18 African Americans to the House of Representatives, more than any state. William L. Dawson represented the Black Belt in Congress from 1943 to his death in office in 1970. He started as a Republican but switched to the Democrats like most of his constituents in the late 1930s. In 1949, he became the first African American to chair a congressional committee.

Chicago is home to three of eight African-American United States senators who have served since Reconstruction, who are all Democrats: Carol Moseley Braun (1993–1999), Barack Obama (2005–2008), and Roland Burris (2009–2010).

Barack Obama moved from the Senate to the White House in 2008.

=== Electing a Black mayor in 1983 ===
In the February 22, 1983, the democrats were split three ways. On the North and Northwest Sides, the incumbent mayor Jane Byrne led and future mayor Richard M. Daley, son of the late Mayor Richard J. Daley, finished a close second. the Black leader Harold Washington had massive majorities on the South and West Sides. Southwest Side voters overwhelmingly supported Daley. Washington won with 37% of the vote, versus 33% for Byrne and 30% for Daley. Although winning the Democratic primary was normally considered tantamount to election in heavily Democratic Chicago, after his primary victory Washington found that his Republican opponent, former state legislator Bernard Epton was supported by many high-ranking Democrats and their ward organizations.

Epton's campaign referred to, among other things, Washington's conviction for failure to file income tax returns (he had paid the taxes, but had not filed a return). Washington, on the other hand, stressed reforming the Chicago patronage system and the need for a jobs program in a tight economy. In the April 12, 1983, mayoral general election, Washington defeated Epton by 3.7%, 51.7% to 48.0%, to become mayor of Chicago. Washington was sworn in as mayor on April 29, 1983, and resigned his Congressional seat the following day.

== Distribution ==
In 2024, the distribution of African-Americans throughout Chicago's 77 official community areas were as follows:

2024 African American Population by Community Area
No.	Name	Side	African American Pop	% African American
01	Rogers Park	North	11,729	21.7
02	West Ridge	North	9,180	11.7
03	Uptown	North	10,713	19.0
04	Lincoln Square	North	1,732	4.2
05	North Center	North	846	2.3
06	Lake View	North	4,603	4.5
07	Lincoln Park	North	1,680	2.5
08	Near North Side	Central	8,520	7.9
09	Edison Park	North	70	0.6
10	Norwood Park	North	379	1.0
11	Jefferson Park	North	750	2.8
12	Forest Glen	North	281	1.4
13	North Park	North	1,022	5.6
14	Albany Park	North	1,598	3.5
15	Portage Park	North	1,474	2.3
16	Irving Park	North	1,980	3.7
17	Dunning	North	1,048	2.5
18	Montclare	North	1,041	7.3
19	Belmont Cragin	North	2,829	3.9
20	Hermosa	North	671	3.0
21	Avondale	North	1,123	3.2
22	Logan Square	North	4,120	5.8
23	Humboldt Park	West	16,932	30.2
24	West Town	West	5,355	6.1
25	Austin	West	67,261	69.0
26	West Garfield Park	West	13,447	89.1
27	East Garfield Park	West	16,382	79.0
28	Near West Side	West	16,540	24.3
29	North Lawndale	West	26,663	78.5
30	South Lawndale	West	8,292	11.9
31	Lower West Side	West	791	2.4
32	Loop (The)	Central	4,661	11.0
33	Near South Side	Central	7,941	26.1
34	Armour Square	South	1,630	11.7
35	Douglas	South	13,520	64.1
36	Oakland	South	5,801	83.6
37	Fuller Park	South	1,812	77.3
38	Grand Boulevard	South	21,151	84.0
39	Kenwood	South	11,596	63.0
40	Washington Park	South	11,318	91.9
41	Hyde Park	South	7,941	26.0
42	Woodlawn	South	18,065	75.9
43	South Shore	South	48,243	90.0
44	Chatham	South	27,570	92.1
45	Avalon Park	South	7,977	88.4
46	South Chicago	South	18,991	68.9
47	Burnside	South	2,116	91.8
48	Calumet Heights	South	10,365	92.3
49	Roseland	South	33,635	91.8
50	Pullman	South	5,199	77.1
51	South Deering	South	7,990	62.2
52	East Side	South	535	2.4
53	West Pullman	South	21,739	88.6
54	Riverdale	South	7,128	94.8
55	Hegewisch	South	860	9.6
56	Garfield Ridge	South	1,357	3.7
57	Archer Heights	South	211	1.6
58	Brighton Park	South	933	2.2
59	McKinley Park	South	482	3.2
60	Bridgeport	South	950	2.8
61	New City	South	7,919	19.8
62	West Elsdon	South	238	1.3
63	Gage Park	South	2,253	6.2
64	Clearing	South	221	0.9
65	West Lawn	South	637	2.0
66	Chicago Lawn	South	18,050	33.2
67	West Englewood	South	19,146	68.0
68	Englewood	South	19,897	85.8
69	Greater Grand Crossing	South	25,673	88.1
70	Ashburn	South	17,909	42.6
71	Auburn Gresham	South	40,597	92.7
72	Beverly	South	6,055	31.0
73	Washington Heights	South	23,100	93.0
74	Mount Greenwood	South	668	3.5
75	Morgan Park	South	12,760	61.1
76	O'Hare	North	881	6.1
77	Edgewater	North	6,965	12.3

== Achievements ==
In the late 19th and early 20th century many prominent African Americans were Chicago residents, including Republican and later Democratic congressman William L. Dawson (America's most powerful Black politician) and boxing champion Joe Louis. America's most widely read Black newspaper, the Chicago Defender, was published there and circulated in the South, helping to facilitate the Great Migration of Southern Blacks to Chicago and other northern cities during the first half of the 20th century. Ida B. Wells, a Black woman journalist and civil rights activist, spearheaded a national anti-lynching movement, co-founded the National Association of Colored Women (1896), established the first Black kindergarten in Chicago (1897), and co-founded the NAACP (1909), among her many other achievements.

Chicago also saw some of the first instances of Black labor organization in the country. In 1909, tired of poor working conditions, porters for the Pullman Train Company began their first attempts to unionize but encountered heavy opposition. Later, Black Pullman porters organized secretively to the Brotherhood of the Sleeping Car Porters in 1925.

During the Bronzeville Renaissance period, Chicago hosted many of the nation's leading Black artists, writers, and performers.

After long efforts, in the late 1930s, workers organized across racial lines to form the United Meatpacking Workers of America. By then, the majority of workers in Chicago's plants were Black, but they succeeded in creating an interracial organizing committee. It succeeded in organizing unions both in Chicago and Omaha, Nebraska, the city with the second-largest meatpacking industry. This union belonged to the Congress of Industrial Organizations (CIO), which was more progressive than the American Federation of Labor. They succeeded in lifting segregation of job positions. For a time, workers achieved living wages and other benefits, leading to blue collar middle-class life for decades. Some Blacks were also able to move up the ranks to supervisory and management positions. The CIO also succeeded in organizing Chicago's steel industry.

== Recent decline ==
After peaking at 1.2 million residents in 1980, the Black population of Chicago has entered a steady decline. This decline has coincided with a growing Latino population which is increasingly pushing for greater political representation. The 2020 Census results showed that the Black population of Chicago had slipped to 788,000, while the Latino population had risen to 820,000, marking the first census in which Latino residents outnumbered Black residents in Chicago - with potentially major implications for Black political power in the city as formerly comfortably Black-majority wards are diversifying and consolidating. Per the 2024 U.S. Census estimates, the Black population of Chicago showed a further decline to 702,617 or 25.8% of the total population.

A 2021 report from the Chicago Tribune stated that thousands of Black families have left Chicago in the past decade, lowering the Black population by about 10%. Politico reported that Chicago's once wealthy Black community has dramatically declined with the shuttering of many Black-owned companies. Among the 10 US cities with the largest Black populations in 2000, Chicago saw the second highest decline after Detroit, with a net departure of 261,763 Black residents from 2000 to 2020. The magnitude of Black population outflows corresponds strongly with neighborhood homicide rates, with the Austin community area on the city's Far West Side experiencing the largest drop. Part of the decline has also been attributed to the destruction of public housing at the turn of the century, with the Chicago Housing Authority and city government failing to provide sufficient affordable housing for the evicted residents, thus causing many public housing residents to be displaced to unfamiliar neighborhoods and destabilizing middle-class areas. Additionally, the widely criticized closure of 50 CPS schools - primarily in Black neighborhoods - under the mayoral administration of Rahm Emanuel further exacerbated the population spiral.

Many Blacks leaving Chicago are now moving to outlying suburbs, primarily to the south and west of the city in Cook County, or to the east in Northwest Indiana. Indeed, while Chicago lost more than 260,000 Black residents from 2000 to 2020, the surrounding suburbs gained about 125,000. Other Black Chicagoans are participating in a "Reverse Great Migration" in search of greater economic opportunities in the U.S. South, including cities such as Atlanta, Charlotte, Dallas, Houston, and San Antonio. From 2000 to 2017, the Chicago Federal Reserve found that the largest number of Black households exiting the city had incomes under $35,000, although those with middle incomes (defined as $35,000 - $75,000) constituted 40% of leavers. Black households making at least $100,000, meanwhile, increased modestly during the period. The exodus has been particularly acute in majority-Black neighborhoods: only 35% of predominantly-Black, middle-income census tracts stayed that way in 2017, while 63% fell to low- or moderate-income.

In recent years, the city has adopted measures to try to curtail Black population loss. In 2019, for example, then-mayor Lori Lightfoot announced the Invest South/West initiative to bring $750 million into 10 underserved communities. Other redevelopment efforts have focused along the southern lakefront, with the Obama Presidential Center construction bringing jobs - but also potentially gentrification - to the Woodlawn neighborhood. And, bucking the trend of Black population declines, communities along the southern lakefront including Bronzeville, Hyde Park, Woodlawn, and South Shore all recorded population gains between 2010 and 2020, with a significant portion of the influx driven by college-educated Black residents. Notably in Bronzeville, demographers found two of just 193 census tracts nationally that achieved a significant decrease in poverty with minimal displacement of existing populations between 2010 and 2015 - attributed in large part to the abundance of vacant lots which have created opportunities for new construction. This area holds potential for continued future growth even as the Black population of the city as a whole continues to decline.

The influx of Black families in the Chicago suburbs has largely mirrored their spatial distribution in the city, with the majority of predominantly-Black suburbs located to the south and west of Chicago. While a smaller share of the Black population than communities in Atlanta or Washington, there is a noticeable Black middle class presence in the south suburbs of Cook County. A report from the National Association of Real Estate Brokers (NAREB) indicated that between 2012 and 2016, 5 of the top 10 municipalities nationwide (with at least 500 Black households) registering the highest Black homeownership rates were Chicago suburbs - including Olympia Fields (98%), South Holland (85%), Flossmoor (83%), Matteson (80%), and Lynwood (80%). The report notes that the majority of these suburbs were majority-White as recently as 1990.

== Crime ==
Black people in Chicago are more likely to be victims of homicide.

== Foreign-born Blacks ==
Foreign born Blacks make up 4% of Chicago's Black population. In the 1970s East Africans from Ethiopia, Eritrea, and Somalia formed a small enclave in the Edgewater and Uptown neighborhoods on Chicago's North Side, which has since been enriched by new arrivals from West Africa, including Nigerians and Ghanaians.

=== Ethiopians ===
Around 4,500 Ethiopians lived in Chicago in 2000, with the population declining modestly to 3,875 in 2020.

=== Ghanaians ===
As of 2020, there were 2,977 Chicagoans with at least partial Ghanaian ancestry.

=== Nigerians ===
Nigerian people constitute the city's largest African community, with 12,601 Nigerians in the city as of the 2020 census and an estimated number in excess of 30,000 living in the broader metropolitan region.

== Notable people ==
* Tom Towles
- Bernie Mac
- Michelle Obama
- Barack Obama
- Oprah Winfrey
- Michael Jordan
- Jesse Jackson
- Dick Gregory
- Dwyane Wade
- Derrick Rose
- Kanye West
- Tim Hardaway
- Anthony Davis
- Chance the Rapper
- Rhymefest
- Chief Keef
- Redd Foxx
- Sam Cooke
- Earth, Wind, and Fire
- R. Kelly
- Jennifer Hudson
- Shonda Rhimes
- Muhammad Ali
- Curtis Mayfield
- Minnie Riperton
- Louis Armstrong
- Muddy Waters
- Ida B Wells
- Emmett Till
- Lil Durk
- King Von
- G Herbo
- Lil Bibby
- Juice WRLD
- Polo G
- Dreezy
- Cupcakke
- Buddy Guy
- Nat King Cole
- Harold Washington
- Lupe Fiasco
- Twista
- Common
- Chaka Khan
- Keke Palmer
- Noname
- Dantrell Davis
- Donell Jones
- Carl Thomas
- Vivian G. Harsh
- Oscar Stanton De Priest
- Harold Washington

== See also ==
- Great Migration (African American)
- Second Great Migration (African American)
  - African Americans in Baltimore
  - History of African Americans in Boston
  - History of African Americans in Detroit
  - African Americans in New York City
  - History of African Americans in Philadelphia
- Chicago Black Renaissance
- Chicago State University
- Chicago Race Riot of 1919
- History of Chicago
- History of education in Chicago
- Political history of Chicago
- George Floyd protests in Chicago
- Demographics of Chicago
- Ethnic groups in Chicago
  - Bosnians in Chicago
  - Czechs in Chicago
  - Germans in Chicago
  - Italians in Chicago
  - Japanese in Chicago
  - Indians in Chicago
  - History of the Jews in Chicago
  - Koreans in Chicago
  - Luxembourgers in Chicago
  - Mexicans in Chicago
  - Poles in Chicago
  - Puerto Ricans in Chicago
  - Romani people in Chicago
  - Swedes in Chicago
- Sapphire and Crystals, African American women's artists collective in Chicago
