= Racine Avenue station =

Commuter rail station in Chicago, Illinois

Racine Avenue

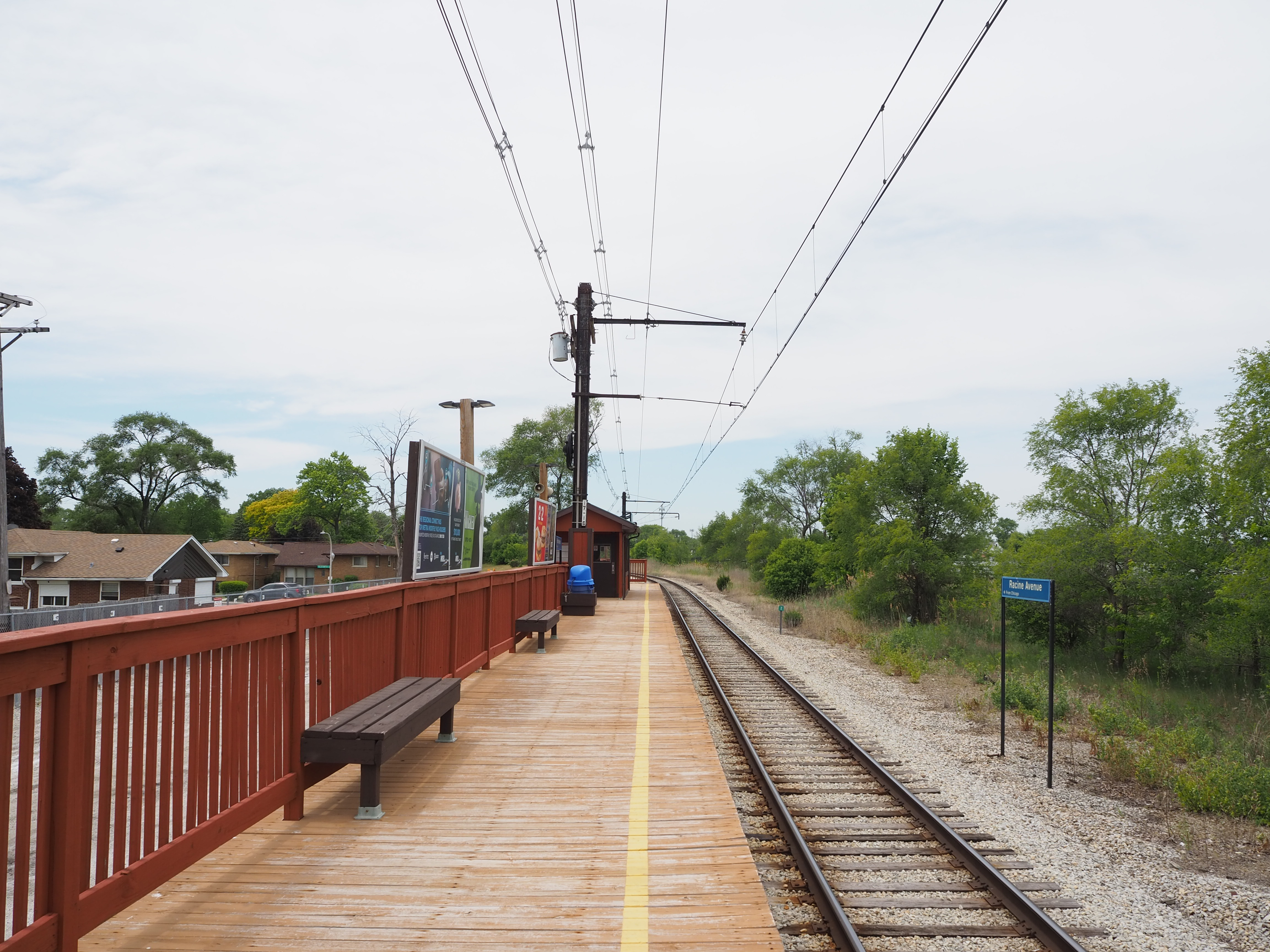

General information
- Location: Racine Avenue south of 120th Street; West Pullman, Chicago, Illinois
- Coordinates: 41.6741°N 87.6520°W
- Owner: Metra
- Line: Blue Island Subdistrict
- Platforms: 1 side platform
- Tracks: 1

Construction
- Structure type: Open-sheltered platform
- Parking: Yes
- Accessible: No

Other information
- Fare zone: 2

History
- Electrified: 1926

Passengers
- 2018: 28 (average weekday) ▼9.7%
- Rank: 221 out of 236

Services
Preceding station	Metra	Following station
Ashland/Calumet Park toward Blue Island	Metra Electric Blue Island Branch	West Pullman toward Millennium
Former services
Preceding station	Illinois Central Railroad	Following station
Ashland Avenue toward Blue Island	Electric Suburban Blue Island Branch	West Pullman toward Randolph Street
Track layout
Location

Racine Avenue is a commuter rail station along the Blue Island Branch of the Metra Electric line in the West Pullman neighborhood of Chicago, Illinois. The station is officially located at Racine Avenue, South of 120th Street, and is 17.0 miles (27.4 km) away from the northern terminus at Millennium Station. In Metra's zone-based fare system, Racine Avenue is in zone 2. As of 2018, Racine Avenue is the 221st busiest of Metra's 236 non-downtown stations, with an average of 28 weekday boardings.

Racine Avenue is the last station along the Blue Island Branch within the Chicago city limits. Parking is available exclusively along 121st Street between South Elizabeth and South Racine Avenues. No bus connections are available at this station.

A station typology adopted by the Chicago Plan Commission on October 16, 2014, assigns the Racine Avenue station a typology of Mixed Residential/Industrial Neighborhood (MRIN). This typology is an area in which the Metra station serves both residential and industrial uses. Like most of the MRIN stations, it does not have access to CTA rail.
