= Burr Oak station =

Commuter rail station in Blue Island, Illinois

Burr Oak

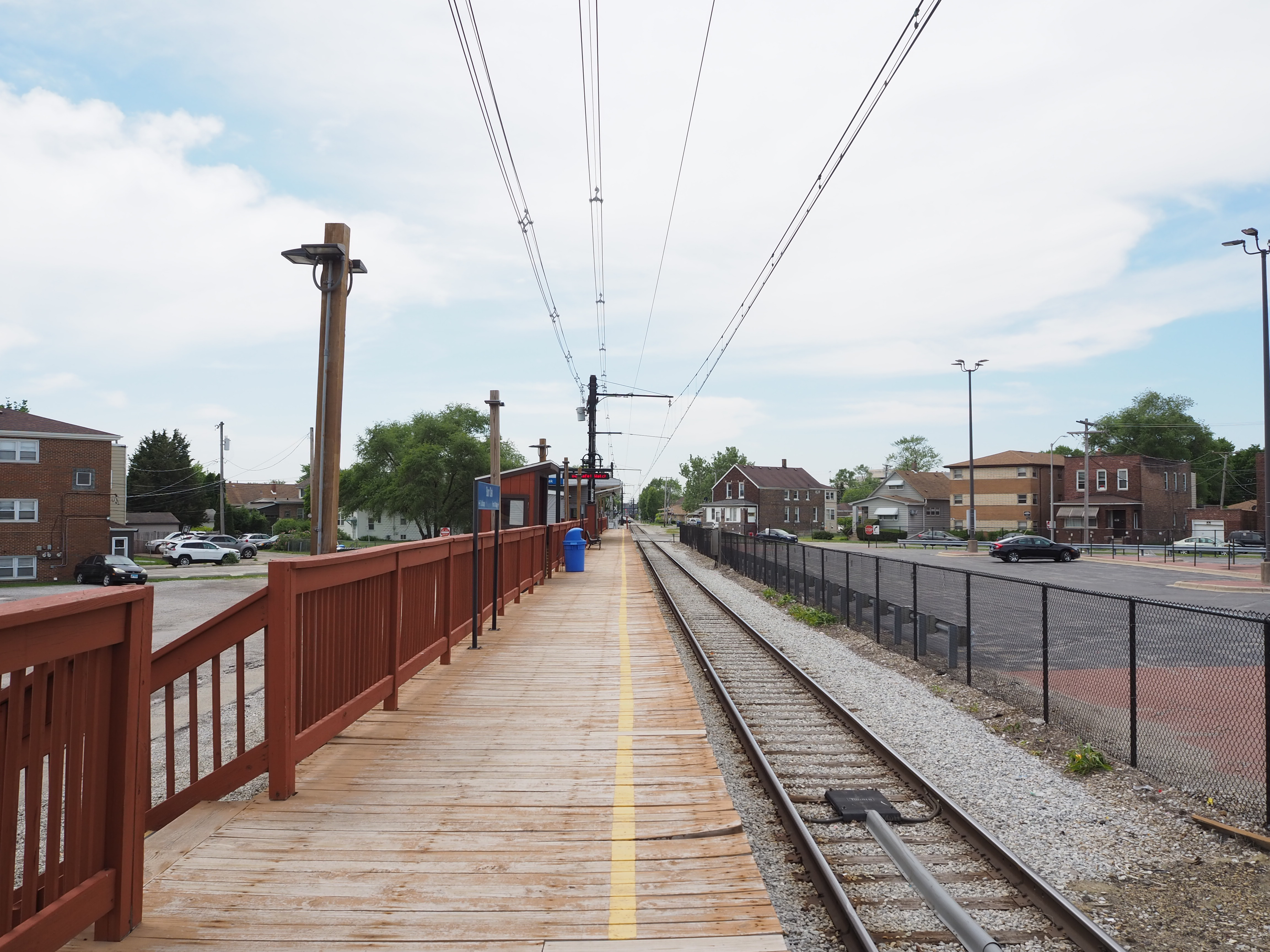

General information
- Location: Burr Oak Avenue near Lincoln Street; Blue Island, Illinois
- Coordinates: 41.6622°N 87.6688°W
- Owner: Metra
- Line: Blue Island Subdistrict
- Platforms: 1 side platform
- Tracks: 1
- Connections: Pace Bus

Construction
- Parking: Yes
- Accessible: No

Other information
- Fare zone: 2

History
- Electrified: 1926

Passengers
- 2018: 89 (average weekday) ▼23.9%
- Rank: 193 out of 236

Services
Preceding station	Metra	Following station
Blue Island Terminus	Metra Electric Blue Island Branch	Ashland/Calumet Park toward Millennium
Former services
Preceding station	Illinois Central Railroad	Following station
Blue Island Terminus	Electric Suburban Blue Island Branch	Ashland Avenue toward Randolph Street
Track layout
Location

Burr Oak is a commuter rail station along the Blue Island Branch of the Metra Electric line in Blue Island, Illinois. The station is located on Burr Oak Avenue near Lincoln Street, and is 18.4 miles (29.6 km) away from the northern terminus at Millennium Station. In Metra's zone-based fare system, Burr Oak is in zone 2. As of 2018, Burr Oak is the 193rd busiest of Metra's 236 non-downtown stations, with an average of 89 weekday boardings. It borders the City of Blue Island.

Parking is available behind the station on the southeast corner of Burr Oak Avenue and Winchester Street. One Pace bus connection is available at the station.

== Bus connections ==
Pace

- 359 Robbins/South Kedzie Avenue
