= West Pullman station =

Commuter rail station in Chicago, Illinois

West Pullman

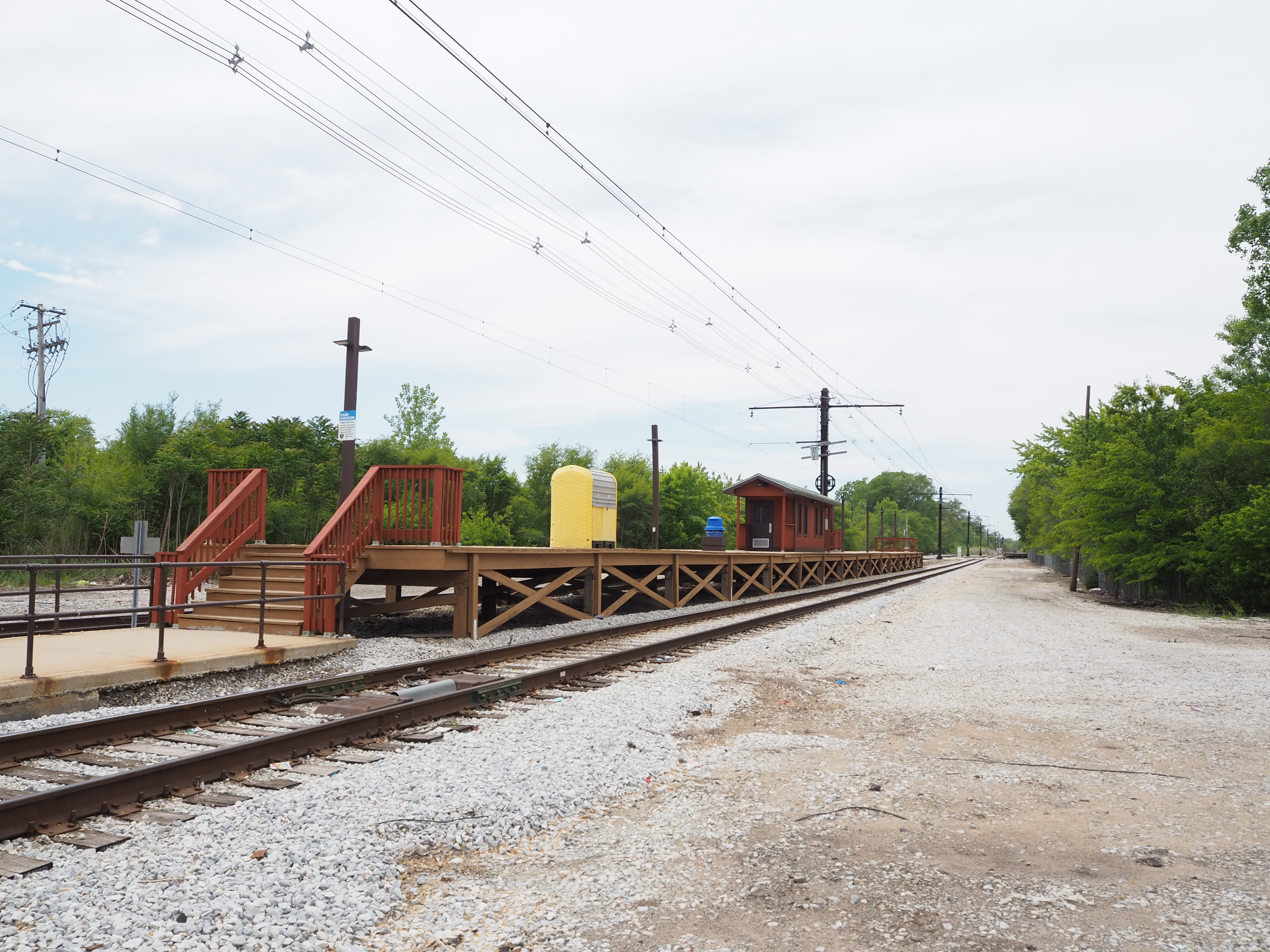

General information
- Location: Halsted Street south of 120th Street; West Pullman, Chicago, Illinois
- Coordinates: 41.6742°N 87.6429°W
- Owner: Metra
- Line: Blue Island Subdistrict
- Platforms: 1 Island platform
- Tracks: 2
- Connections: CTA Bus; Pace Bus

Construction
- Structure type: Sheltered platform
- Parking: Yes
- Accessible: No

Other information
- Fare zone: 2

History
- Electrified: 1926

Passengers
- 2018: 13 (average weekday) ▼40.9%
- Rank: 232 out of 236

Services
Preceding station	Metra	Following station
Racine Avenue toward Blue Island	Metra Electric Blue Island Branch	Stewart Ridge toward Millennium
Former services
Preceding station	Illinois Central Railroad	Following station
Racine Avenue toward Blue Island	Electric Suburban Blue Island Branch	Stewart Ridge toward Randolph Street
Track layout
Location

West Pullman is a commuter rail station along the Blue Island Branch of the Metra Electric line in the West Pullman neighborhood of Chicago, Illinois. It is located over Halsted Street halfway between 120th and 122nd Streets, and is 16.7 miles (26.9 km) away from the northern terminus at Millennium Station. In Metra's zone-based fare system, West Pullman is in zone 2. As of 2018, West Pullman is the 232nd busiest of Metra's 236 non-downtown stations, with an average of 13 weekday boardings.

Although most of the Blue Island Branch contains only one track, there are two tracks at West Pullman, making it a passing siding. The only other station along the branch that has two tracks is the terminus at Blue Island itself. One parking lot exists on the north side of the tracks along the southbound lane of Halsted Street. Due to its close proximity to the outskirts of Chicago, the station provides bus connections from both the Chicago Transit Authority and Pace suburban bus system.

A station typology adopted by the Chicago Plan Commission on October 16, 2014, assigns the West Pullman station a typology of Mixed Residential/Industrial Neighborhood (MRIN). This typology is an area in which the Metra station serves both residential and industrial uses. Like most of the MRIN stations, it does not have access to CTA rail.

== Bus connections ==
CTA

- 8A South Halsted
- 108 Halsted/95th (weekday rush hours only)

Pace

- 352 Halsted
- 359 Robbins/South Kedzie Avenue
