= Ethnic groups in Chicago =

The mix of ethnic groups in Chicago has varied over the history of the city, resulting in a diverse community in the twenty-first century. The changes in the ethnicity of the population have reflected the history and mass America, as well as internal demographic changes. The groups have been important in the development of the city as well as players in occasional conflicts.

== Twenty-first century ==
As of the 2010 census, there were 2,695,598 people with 1,045,560 households residing within Chicago. More than half the population of the state of Illinois lives in the Chicago metropolitan area. Chicago is also one of the US's most densely populated major cities. The racial composition of the city was:

- 45.0% White (31.7% non-Hispanic whites);
- 32.9% Black or African American;
- 13.4% from some other race;
- 5.5% Asian (1.6% Chinese, 1.1% Indian, 1.1% Filipino, 0.4% Korean, 0.3% Pakistani, 0.3% Vietnamese, 0.2% Japanese, 0.1% Thai);
- 2.7% from two or more races;
- 0.5% American Indian.

Chicago has a Hispanic or Latino population of 28.9%. (Its members may belong to any race; 21.4% Mexican, 3.8% Puerto Rican, 0.7% Guatemalan, 0.6% Ecuadorian, 0.3% Cuban, 0.3% Colombian, 0.2% Honduran, 0.2% Salvadoran, 0.2% Peruvian) The Guatemalan and Peruvian communities have grown substantially in the 2000s, and some estimates give higher percentages.

== Ethnic groups ==
=== Black/African Americans ===
==== Tanzanians ====
Most Tanzanians who have arrived in the United States since 1986 have chosen to settle in Chicago. Many of them are students and professionals who came to the city to pursue an advanced degree or work for an employer that sponsored their entry into the United States. Some of the Tanzanians have returned to their home country a few years after arriving in the U. S.

Religion plays an active role in the lives of many Tanzanian Americans in Chicago.

==== Nigerians ====
More than 30,000 Nigerians live in Chicago. Nigerians are Chicago's largest African community.

==== Haitians ====
Approximately 10,000–22,000 Haitians live in the Chicago area.

==== Other Black/African American groups ====
Other Black or African American groups present in Chicago include Ethiopians, Ghanaians, Kenyans, South Africans, Ivorians, Senegalese, Angolans, Somalis, Cameroonians, Togolese, Eritreans, Zimbabweans, Malians, Sierra Leoneans, Sudanese, Zambians, Gambians, Guineans, and Jamaicans.

=== Hispanic and Latino Americans ===
Nearly two million Hispanic live in metropolitan Chicago, representing in excess of 20% of the region's total population and constituting the third largest Hispanic community in the United States. Like other regions of the nation, Chicago Hispanic are the fastest growing segment of the overall population, increasing 25% in the last decade, and are, not surprisingly, beginning to wield enormous economic and political clout as their numbers grow. About 20% of Chicago's Hispanics also happen to be undocumented migrants. Mexicans make up the largest portion of the Hispanic population in Chicago at 79.2%, with Puerto Ricans the second largest, Central Americans the third largest, and Ecuadorians, the fourth largest, Cubans the fifth, Colombians the sixth, and Peruvians the seventh largest.

==== Cubans ====
There is a substantial Cuban population in Chicago. Cubans first migrated to Chicago during the 1950s.

==== Dominicans ====
There is a small community of Dominicans in Chicago. They are concentrated in the Humboldt Park neighborhood and Chicago's Northwest Side. Dominican families have lived in Chicago since 1966.

==== Ecuadorians ====
Ecuadorians are one of the largest Latin American group in Chicago. Ecuadorian presence in the city dates back to the mid-twentieth century.

==== Guatemalans ====
Chicago has a significant Guatemalan population.

==== Salvadorans ====
Chicago's Salvadoran population is concentrated in the North Side neighborhoods of Rogers Park, Albany Park, Logan Square, and Edgewater.

==== Venezuelans ====
There is a Venezuelan community in Chicago. A large number of Venezuelans arrived in Chicago in 2022 due to Operation Lone Star's bussing program, which brought over 51,000 migrants to Chicago, many of whom were Venezuelan.

==== Other Latin American groups ====
Other groups of Latin Americans present in Chicago include Brazilians, Chileans, Uruguayans, Costa Ricans, Paraguayans, Bolivians, Nicaraguans, Peruvians, Argentinians, Colombians, and Hondurans.

=== White Americans ===
Chicago has one of the largest Central/Eastern European and/or Slavic immigrant populations in the nation. The largest amongst this particular group are the Poles. Polish is the second-most spoken foreign language in Chicago behind Spanish.

==== Albanian Americans ====
Approximately 20,000 Albanians live in Chicago.

==== Armenian Americans ====
As of 2006 the Armenian population is located in the far northwest of Chicago and in the Chicago suburbs. Waukegan, Illinois has a significant Armenian population. For a period its mayor was Armenian. The initial settlement of Armenians was in West Pullman on the Far South Side. In the early 1900s Armenians fleeing persecution from Turks arrived in Chicago. In the middle of the twentieth century, some Armenians in Chicago favored Armenian independence and some favored the Soviet Union. Additional Armenians arrived after Armenia's 1991 independence from the Soviet Union. Most Chicago area Armenians are businesspeople. Irving wrote that "they dominate the imported rug market."

==== Bosnian Americans ====
Chicago is the home to the largest Bosnian population outside Europe.

==== Bulgarians ====
Chicago is home to one of the largest Bulgarian immigrant populations outside Bulgaria, with an estimated 20,000–25,000 residents. The community is supported by institutions like St. John of Rila Bulgarian Orthodox Church and the John Atanasoff Bulgarian School, which help preserve language, culture, and traditions.

==== Croatian Americans ====
There is a Croatian presence in Chicago.

==== English Americans ====
The English have been a significant presence in the city since the early nineteenth century.

Circa 2017 the placement of Dyson's US headquarters in Chicago was a factor that caused British nationals to come to Chicago. The Chicago Tribune stated that British citizens are scattered throughout the metropolitan area rather than being concentrated in a particular place. A Baird & Warner real estate agent, Jim Kinney, stated that suburbs to the west were popular with "middle management" while higher levels of employees had preferences for the Chicago North Shore.

==== French and French Canadians ====
The Midwest region was under French jurisdiction under New France. However, French cultural presence diminished greatly after the Treaty of Paris in 1763, which ended French rule in North America. In the 1870s, some French Canadian families moved to the Brighton Park neighborhood. Interest in French culture was maintained by Chicago society, many of whom traveled frequently to France and would eventually found the Alliance Française de Chicago in 1897.

==== Greek Americans ====
Around 150,000 Greeks live in Chicago.

Saints Constantine and Helen Greek Orthodox Church in Palos Hills operates a parochial elementary school, Koraes Elementary School, which has the History of Greece and the Greek language in its curriculum.

==== Latvian Americans ====
Approximately 4,000 Latvians live in Chicago. Propelled by a desire for economic and political change from hardships in the Russian Empire, Latvians began arriving in Chicago in the late nineteenth century.

==== Other White ethnic groups ====
Bulgarians began to arrive in Chicago in the 1870s.

Greeks began arriving in Chicago in the 1840s.

Hungarians emigrated to Chicago at the end of the nineteenth century.

Other European ethnic groups in Chicago are Croatians, French, Slovaks, Macedonians, Estonians, Latvians, Slovenes, Dutch, Spaniards Norwegians, Romanians, Belgians, Portuguese, Luxembourgers, Cypriots, Danish, Georgian, Icelandic, and Finnish.

=== Arab and Middle Eastern Americans ===
==== Assyrian Americans ====
According to the 2000 U.S. census, Chicago is home to 15,683 Assyrians. This is believed to be the largest Assyrian population in the United States. The Assyrians in Chicago settled in Albany Park, Edgewater, Rogers Park, and Uptown. In the suburbs, Assyrians have settled Morton Grove, Niles, and Skokie.

The first Assyrian church in Chicago opened in 1917 in the Near North Side.

The Assyrian American Association was established in 1917. It is located at 1618 West Devon Avenue, two blocks east of the Assyrian Pentecostal Church.

==== Iranian Americans ====
In 2006 there were perhaps as many as 25,000 Chicago area Iranians, including about 6,000 in the Chicago city limits. Iranian ethnic groups represented include Persians, Kurds, Turks, Azeris, and Lurs. Many Iranians live in Uptown. Reza's, which Irving described as one of the most famous Iranian restaurants in Chicago, is in Uptown. Some Iranians operate restaurants and small retail stores, some work in professions, and some work as taxi drivers. Religious groups represented include Muslims and Bahá'í. The Bahá'í temple is in Wilmette, Illinois.

==== Palestinian Americans ====
As of 2006, there are about 8,500 Arabs in the Chicago metropolitan area, with most of them being Palestinian. Chicago Lawn has one main area of Palestinian settlement, and Albany Park has the other. In the latter, many are Christian. As of 2006 several southwestern suburbs including Bridgeview, Hickory Hills, and Oak Lawn had Arab populations; Robin Amer of WBEZ stated in 2013 that Bridgeview, Oak Lawn, and Orland Park had Arab populations, with Bridgeview having the most established Arab community. Many Arabs arrived to Chicago after the Arab-Israeli wars occurred.

As of 2013, the Chicago area has the largest Palestinian American population in the U.S., and that Chicago-area Palestinian-origin people made up 25% of all Palestinian-originating persons in the U.S. In 1995 there were 85,000 persons of Palestinian origin in the Chicago area, making up about 60% of the Arab Americans there; at that time about 50% of the Chicago-area ethnic Palestinians were born in the U.S. The West Bank is the main source of Palestinian immigration into Chicago, and specifically most of the Palestinian people in the Chicago area have origins in Beitunia. Many of them immigrated as extended families. Palestinian Christians began settling a section of Chicago's North Side in the 1960s. In the 1970s Muslim Palestinians settled Chicago Lawn and Gage Park, and by the 1980s moved into the following southwest Cook County communities: Alsip, Bridgeview, Burbank, Hickory Hills, Oak Lawn, and Palos Hills. An Arab commercial area opened in Albany Park in the 1970s.

==== Syrian Americans ====
In the late 19th century, people from Ottoman Syria, including Muslims from modern day Palestinian territories and historical Palestine and Christians from modern-day Lebanon and Syria, moved to Chicago; at the time people in all three groups were called "Syrians". Many Syrians who moved to Chicago originally were street peddlers. As time passed, they opened linen, carpet, and other luxury good stores; wholesale stores; and dry goods retail stores. In 1893 Syrians who wished to sell products at the Columbian Exposition began arriving to Chicago. 30 Syrian families lived in Chicago at the time World War II started. Until World War II Muslims from the Palestine area living in Chicago were almost all male, and they sent money to relatives in the Middle East and returned to their mother country to retire. Palestinian Christians began moving to the Chicago area in the 1960s. After the Six-Day War in 1967 additional Syrians moved to Chicago.

There is a mosque in Bridgeview and a Greek Orthodox Christian church in Cicero, which is patronized by Palestinian Christians and Jordanian Christians.

Other Middle Eastern groups present in Chicago include Moroccans, Egyptians, Jordanians, and Algerians.

=== Asian Americans ===
In 2011 Asians make up 12.7% of the population in the northwestern Chicago suburbs. As of the 2010 U.S. census, the 10 suburbs with the highest percentages of Asians were South Barrington, Oak Brook, Hoffman Estates, Glendale Heights, Schaumburg, Vernon Hills, Buffalo Grove, Hanover Park, Streamwood, and Naperville. As of 2011, in DuPage County, 10.1% of the population was Asian, and in Lake County 6.3% of the population was Asian.

In 2024, the distribution of Asian-Americans throughout Chicago's 77 official community areas were as follows:

2024 Asian American Polpulation by Community Area
| No. | Name | Side | Asian American Pop | % Asian American |
|---|---|---|---|---|
| 01 | Rogers Park | North | 3,389 | 6.3 |
| 02 | West Ridge | North | 17,104 | 21.8 |
| 03 | Uptown | North | 5,831 | 10.3 |
| 04 | Lincoln Square | North | 3,814 | 9.2 |
| 05 | North Center | North | 2,239 | 6.2 |
| 06 | Lake View | North | 7,480 | 7.3 |
| 07 | Lincoln Park | North | 5,513 | 8.1 |
| 08 | Near North Side | Central | 15,939 | 14.9 |
| 09 | Edison Park | North | 187 | 1.6 |
| 10 | Norwood Park | North | 2,775 | 7.0 |
| 11 | Jefferson Park | North | 3,164 | 11.9 |
| 12 | Forest Glen | North | 2,602 | 13.1 |
| 13 | North Park | North | 5,404 | 29.4 |
| 14 | Albany Park | North | 6,869 | 15.1 |
| 15 | Portage Park | North | 3,716 | 5.9 |
| 16 | Irving Park | North | 4,637 | 8.7 |
| 17 | Dunning | North | 2,516 | 6.1 |
| 18 | Montclare | North | 330 | 2.3 |
| 19 | Belmont Cragin | North | 2,434 | 3.4 |
| 20 | Hermosa | North | 293 | 1.3 |
| 21 | Avondale | North | 1,498 | 4.2 |
| 22 | Logan Square | North | 3,365 | 4.7 |
| 23 | Humboldt Park | West | 1,256 | 2.2 |
| 24 | West Town | West | 5,812 | 6.6 |
| 25 | Austin | West | 830 | 0.9 |
| 26 | West Garfield Park | West | 107 | 0.7 |
| 27 | East Garfield Park | West | 151 | 0.7 |
| 28 | Near West Side | West | 11,691 | 17.2 |
| 29 | North Lawndale | West | 128 | 0.4 |
| 30 | South Lawndale | West | 666 | 1.0 |
| 31 | Lower West Side | West | 1,504 | 4.5 |
| 32 | Loop (The) | Central | 10,327 | 24.3 |
| 33 | Near South Side | Central | 5,576 | 18.3 |
| 34 | Armour Square | South | 9,220 | 66.4 |
| 35 | Douglas | South | 2,721 | 12.9 |
| 36 | Oakland | South | 0 | 0.0 |
| 37 | Fuller Park | South | 40 | 1.7 |
| 38 | Grand Boulevard | South | 131 | 0.5 |
| 39 | Kenwood | South | 1,042 | 5.7 |
| 40 | Washington Park | South | 11 | 0.1 |
| 41 | Hyde Park | South | 5,160 | 16.9 |
| 42 | Woodlawn | South | 998 | 4.2 |
| 43 | South Shore | South | 213 | 0.4 |
| 44 | Chatham | South | 127 | 0.4 |
| 45 | Avalon Park | South | 7 | 0.1 |
| 46 | South Chicago | South | 88 | 0.3 |
| 47 | Burnside | South | 0 | 0.0 |
| 48 | Calumet Heights | South | 32 | 0.3 |
| 49 | Roseland | South | 173 | 0.5 |
| 50 | Pullman | South | 97 | 1.4 |
| 51 | South Deering | South | 15 | 0.1 |
| 52 | East Side | South | 21 | 0.1 |
| 53 | West Pullman | South | 60 | 0.2 |
| 54 | Riverdale | South | 0 | 0.0 |
| 55 | Hegewisch | South | 113 | 1.3 |
| 56 | Garfield Ridge | South | 699 | 1.9 |
| 57 | Archer Heights | South | 787 | 5.9 |
| 58 | Brighton Park | South | 5,090 | 11.8 |
| 59 | McKinley Park | South | 3,534 | 23.8 |
| 60 | Bridgeport | South | 12,694 | 37.7 |
| 61 | New City | South | 1,284 | 3.2 |
| 62 | West Elsdon | South | 410 | 2.3 |
| 63 | Gage Park | South | 267 | 0.7 |
| 64 | Clearing | South | 190 | 0.8 |
| 65 | West Lawn | South | 365 | 1.1 |
| 66 | Chicago Lawn | South | 229 | 0.4 |
| 67 | West Englewood | South | 137 | 0.5 |
| 68 | Englewood | South | 140 | 0.6 |
| 69 | Greater Grand Crossing | South | 212 | 0.7 |
| 70 | Ashburn | South | 419 | 1.0 |
| 71 | Auburn Gresham | South | 231 | 0.5 |
| 72 | Beverly | South | 145 | 0.7 |
| 73 | Washington Heights | South | 70 | 0.3 |
| 74 | Mount Greenwood | South | 134 | 0.7 |
| 75 | Morgan Park | South | 265 | 1.3 |
| 76 | O'Hare | North | 2,066 | 14.4 |
| 77 | Edgewater | North | 7,660 | 13.5 |
| - | Chicago | - | 196,435 | 7.2 |

==== Japanese ====
As of the 2000 U.S. census, 5,500 people of Japanese descent live in the city of Chicago. As of that year 17,500 people of Japanese descent live in the Chicago metropolitan area suburbs such as Arlington Heights, Evanston, Hoffman Estates, Lincolnwood, and Skokie. Most Japanese within the City of Chicago live in lakefront areas in the North Side, including Edgewater, Lake View, Near North Side, Uptown, and West Ridge.

==== Koreans ====
As of the 2000 U.S. Census there were 45,000 South Korean-origin people in the metro area. As of 2006 the largest groups of Koreans are in Albany Park, North Park, West Ridge, and other communities near Albany Park. By that time many Koreans began moving to northern and northwestern Chicago suburbs, settling in Glenview, Morton Grove, Mount Prospect, Niles, Northbrook, Schaumburg, and Skokie. In 2011 Chunho Park, a resident quoted in the Chicago Daily Herald stated that, as paraphrased by journalist Ashok Selvam, "Many Koreans are drawn to the area around Golf Road and Milwaukee Avenue" in the Niles area, in proximity to the Super H Mart.

==== Filipinos ====
As of 2000 the Filipinos are the fourth-largest group immigrating to the Chicago area. As of that year there were a total of 81,000 Filipinos in Chicago metropolitan area, including about 29,000 Filipinos in the City of Chicago. The majority of Filipinos in the City of Chicago live in the North Side and in the Northwest Side. The neighborhoods with especially significant amounts include Edgewater, and Uptown to the north and Albany Park, Irving Park, Lincoln Square, and West Ridge to the northwest. Suburban cities with Filipinos included Glendale Heights, Morton Grove, North Chicago, Skokie, and Waukegan.

As of 2000 most Filipinos work in the medical sector. The Filipinos had the highest annual median household income, at $55,164, according to the 2000 U.S. Census. Many Filipinos live in close proximity to hospitals or near Chicago Transit Authority (CTA) elevated lines.

In the 1920s the first group of Filipinos arrived in Chicago. The first group of Filipinos had to work as laborers in hotels and restaurants, for the post office, and for Pullman's menial jobs due to discrimination. There were about 2,000 Filipinos in Chicago by 1930. After the Immigration and Nationality Act of 1965 passed, Filipino immigration increased.

The Filipino-American Council of Chicago, founded in 1948, serves the community.

==== Indians, Bangladeshis and Pakistanis ====
As of 2006 there are about 114,000 Indian-origin people in the Chicago metropolitan area, a population of Pakistan-origin people fewer than one-sixth of the Indian count, and a growing Bangladeshi population; together they make up about 30% of the Asian Americans in the Chicago area, and it is the second largest combined population of Indians, Bangladeshi and Pakistanis in the U.S. after that of New York City, and the fourth largest in North America after that of New York City, Toronto and Vancouver. As of 2006 the Indians are the third largest immigrant group settling in .

The main Indopak business district is along Devon Avenue between Damen Avenue and California Avenue. There are also Indopak businesses in Chicago suburbs. In 2006 Cutler wrote that "Indians and Pakistanis are dispersed throughout the metropolitan area". Chicago suburbs with significant populations of Indopak people are Des Plaines, Downers Grove, Glendale Heights, Hanover Park, Hoffman Estates, Mount Prospect, Naperville, Oak Brook, Palatine, Schaumburg, Skokie.

The Immigration and Nationality Act of 1965 increased settlements of Indians, Bangladeshis and Pakistanis. Many initial settlers were professionals who arrived in Uptown and later relocated to wealthy suburbs. As of 2006 many more recent immigrants, after arriving, start work as office workers, janitors, and taxicab drivers; they are from lower income backgrounds.

Cutler wrote that the Indian and Pakistani groups "often live in close proximity and have had similar experiences, including some discrimination" but the two groups "generally keep separate". Cutler wrote that in regards to the Indian and Pakistani groups "in Chicago their relations are more peaceful than those on the Indian subcontinent." The Chicago metropolitan area has 70 non-Muslim Indian social groups. Older Indians participate in the regional linguistic-based groups, but younger people do not participate as often. Both groups keep track of developments in South Asia and have concerns about the development of the youth in the United States.

Indian-Americans are among the most economically successful recent immigrants to the Chicago area. As of 2006 many Indians and Pakistanis operate Dunkin' Donuts franchise locations.

The Indians, Bangladeshi and Pakistanis have distinct religious, educational, and social facilities. Most Bangladeshi and Pakistani religious facilities are Muslim. But diverse ethnicities and sectarian groups of Pakistani origin often organize themselves along sectarian or ethnic lines. Of the Indians, about 80% are Hindu, about 7% are Muslim, and about 5% are Sikh. Cities with Hindu temples include Aurora, Bartlett, and Lemont. The Lemont temple was dedicated in 1986 and as of 2004 the Bartlett temple is new.

==== Thais ====
As of 2006 there were about 10,000 people of Thai origins in the north and northwest sides of Chicago and various suburbs. The most prominent suburban group is in Bridgeview.

The first Thais arrived in the 1950s. Many of them were university students.

As of 2006 over half of the Thais in the Chicago area work in the medical sector. Thai doctors and nurses came because in the United States there was a lack of health professionals. There are around 12 Thai groceries in the Chicago area as of 2006. At first produce was transported by aircraft from Bangkok since some Thais had difficulty in eating American food. By 2006 many kinds of Thai produce were now produced in the United States.

There are five Thai Buddhist temples in the Chicago area. The largest is the Thai Buddhist Temple in Bridgeview. Three temples are in the southwest suburbs.

By 2006 many Thai restaurants were established in Chicago. The largest concentrations were in the Near North Side and the Lakeview/Uptown/Edgewater areas.

==== Romani ====
Romani people first came to Chicago during the large waves of Southern and Eastern European immigration to the United States in the 1880s until World War I.

==== Other Asian groups ====
Of the Southeast Asians in Chicago, most of them are Vietnamese. Some of them are Laotians. There is a primarily Vietnamese neighborhood near Argyle Street in Uptown.

As of 2006, several thousand Cambodians live in Chicago. Most of them are Buddhists and many had arrived in Chicago in 1979-1985 from rural areas after the Khmer Rouge killings. Many live in the same areas as Laotians and Vietnamese, while some who had gained economic status after arriving moved to the suburbs. The Cambodian Association is located in Uptown.

As of 2006 there were fewer than 1,000 Indonesians in Chicago and its suburbs. As of that year the number of Indonesian restaurants was increasing.

In December 1999, according to the Hmong National Development Inc., Chicago had about 500 Hmong people.

Afghans, Nepalese, Burmese, Singaporeans, Tibetans, Taiwanese, Mongolians and Malaysians are present in Chicago.

=== Native Americans ===
As of 2018 the Chicago area has over 65,000 people with ancestry from around 175 Native American tribes, making it the third largest settlement of Native Americans in an American urban area.

The American Indian Center (AIC) in Albany Park is a community center for Native Americans and helps people moving from reservations adjust to life in Chicago. It previously offered a larger amount of social service support, but the establishment of Native Americans lead to a scaleback of these programs. Until 2017 it occupied an ex-Masonic lodge in Uptown. The AIC's executive director, a Wyandotte woman named Heather Miller, stated that the Native American presence in the area gave the community the nickname "Redskin Row". The AIC moved to its current location after the AIC sold the former facility.

Prior to the development of Chicago, the Algonquin, Miami, and other tribes lived in the area. Almost all were eventually removed after the Black Hawk War and the 1833 Treaty of Chicago occurred in the mid-1830s, but some Native Americans came to Chicago in the 1950s as a result of the Indian Relocation Act of 1956.

=== Others ===
Israelis began coming to Chicago in the 1970s during a period of military conflict and economic issues in Israel.

Other communities present in Chicago include Australians, Barbadians, Belizeans, New Zealanders, Pacific Islanders, Canadians, and Guyanese.
