= State Street station (Illinois) =

Commuter rail station in Chicago, Illinois

State Street

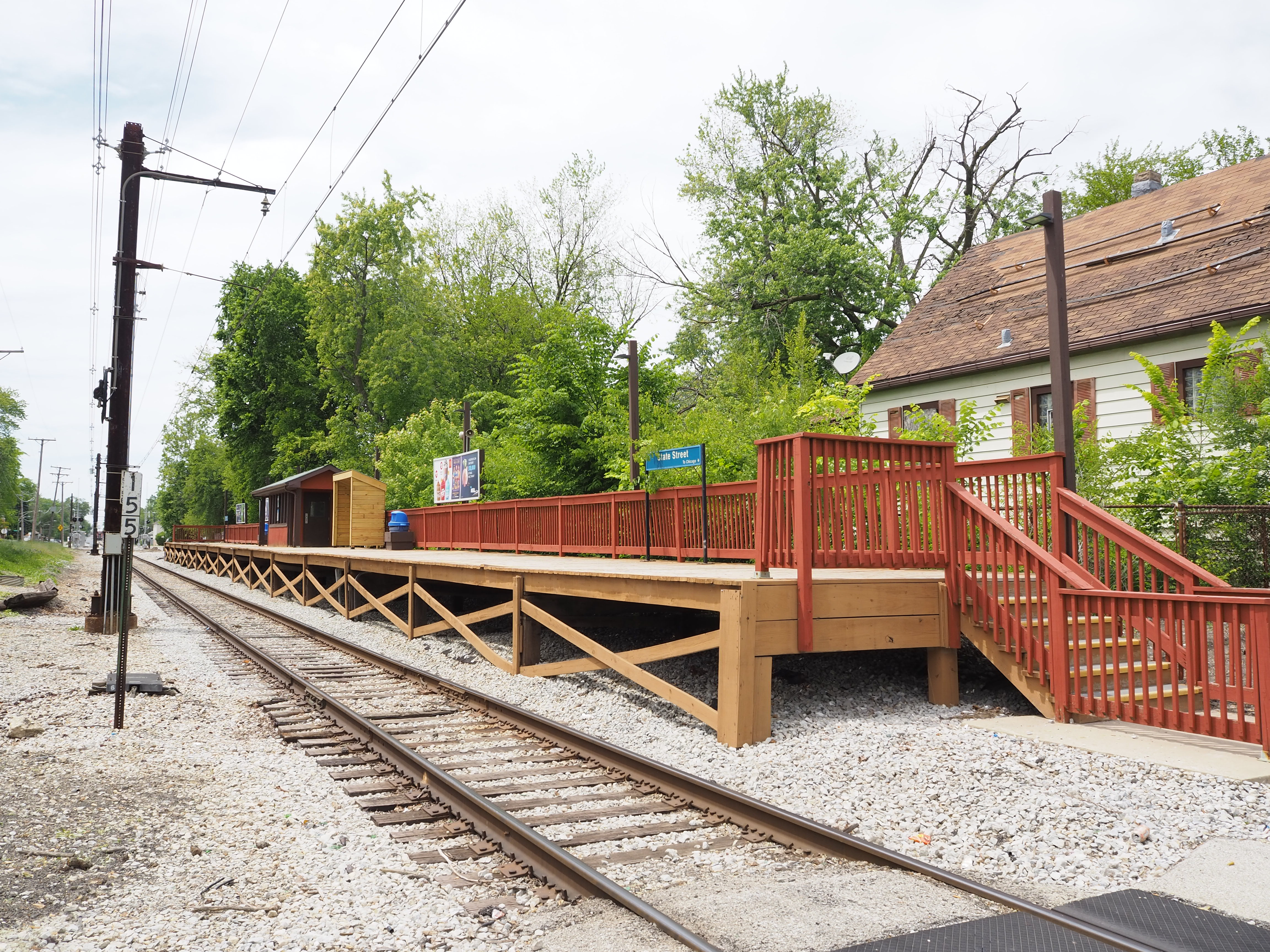

General information
- Location: State Street, South of 120th Place; West Pullman, Chicago, Illinois
- Coordinates: 41.6744°N 87.6216°W
- Owner: Metra
- Line: Blue Island Subdistrict
- Platforms: 1 side platform
- Tracks: 1
- Connections: CTA Bus; Pace Bus

Construction
- Accessible: No

Other information
- Fare zone: 2

History
- Electrified: 1926

Passengers
- 2018: 41 (average weekday) ▲36.7%
- Rank: 214 out of 236

Services
Preceding station	Metra	Following station
Stewart Ridge toward Blue Island	Metra Electric Blue Island Branch	115th Street/Kensington toward Millennium
Former services
Preceding station	Illinois Central Railroad	Following station
Stewart Ridge toward Blue Island	Electric Suburban Blue Island Branch	115th Street toward Randolph Street
Track layout
Location

State Street is the first station along the Blue Island Branch of the Metra Electric line in the West Pullman neighborhood of Chicago, Illinois.

== Geography ==
The station is officially located at State Street, South of 120th Place (though in reality runs along the median of 121st Street), and is 15.6 miles (25.1 km) away from the northern terminus at Millennium Station. In Metra's zone-based fare system, State Street is in zone 2. As of 2018, State Street is the 214th busiest of Metra's 236 non-downtown stations, with an average of 41 weekday boardings.

A station typology adopted by the Chicago Plan Commission on October 16, 2014, assigns the State Street typology of Low Density Neighborhood. The station is surrounded primarily by residential uses. Most riders walk or bike to the station. There is no commuter parking lot for this station, but there is still parking near the station.

== Bus connections ==
CTA

- 34 South Michigan (Owl Service)
