= Stewart Ridge station =

Commuter rail station in Chicago, Illinois

Stewart Ridge

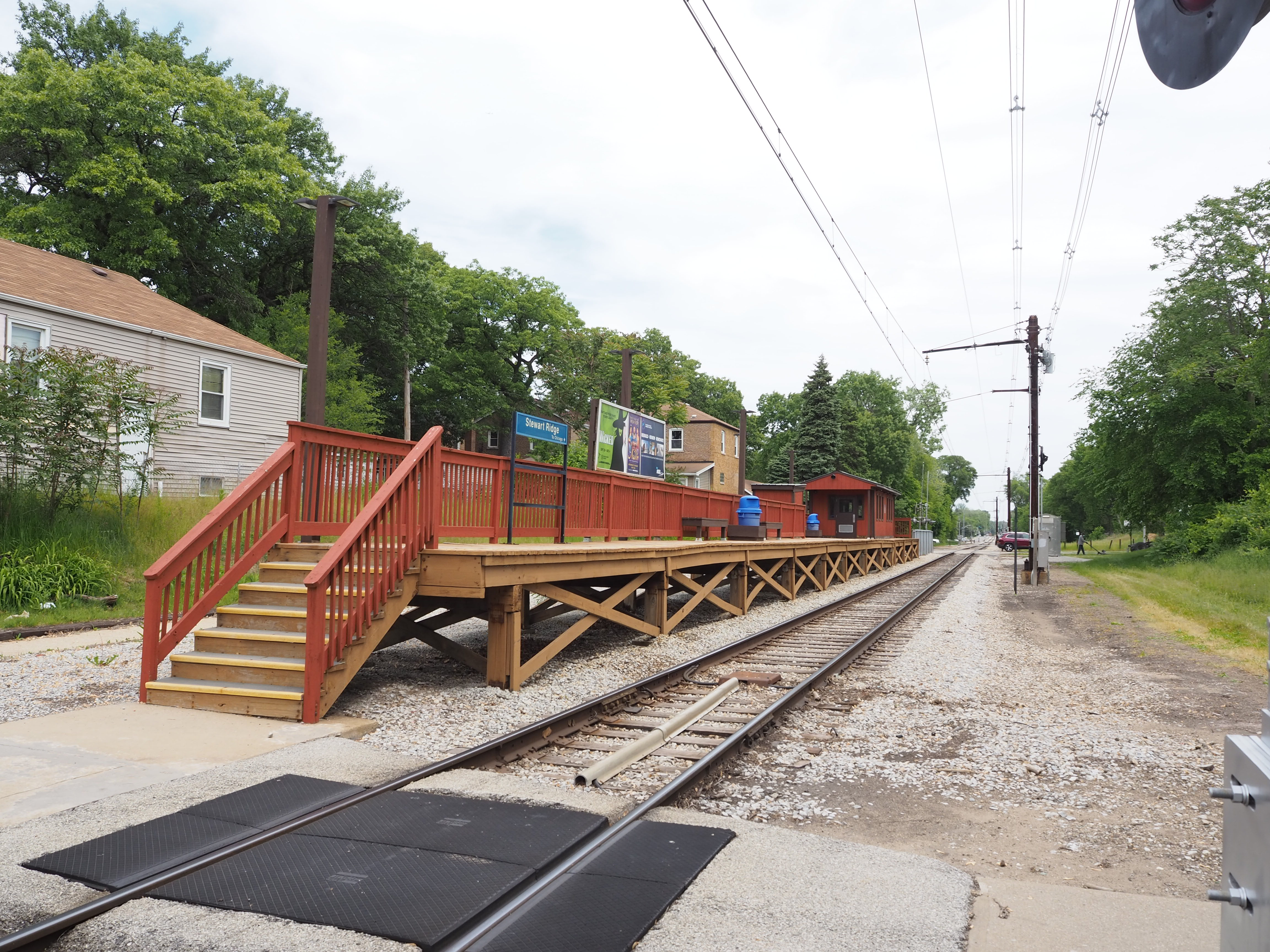

General information
- Location: Stewart Ridge, South of 120th Place; West Pullman, Chicago, Illinois
- Coordinates: 41.6744°N 87.6314°W
- Line: Blue Island Subdistrict
- Platforms: 1 side platform
- Tracks: 1

Construction
- Parking: No
- Accessible: No

Other information
- Fare zone: 2

History
- Electrified: 1926

Passengers
- 2018: 19 (average weekday) ▼47.2%
- Rank: 228 out of 236

Services
Preceding station	Metra	Following station
West Pullman toward Blue Island	Metra Electric Blue Island Branch	State Street toward Millennium
Former services
Preceding station	Illinois Central Railroad	Following station
West Pullman toward Blue Island	Electric Suburban Blue Island Branch	State Street–Rose Lawn toward Randolph Street
Track layout
Location

Stewart Ridge is a commuter rail station along the Blue Island Branch of the Metra Electric line in the West Pullman neighborhood of Chicago, Illinois. The official address, according to Metra is Stewart Ridge, South of 120th Place. The actual location is between Stewart Avenue and Harvard Avenue, halfway between 120th Street and 122nd Street, which is 16.1 miles (25.9 km) away from the northern terminus at Millennium Station. In Metra's zone-based fare system, Stewart Ridge is in zone 2. As of 2018, Stewart Ridge is the 228th busiest of Metra's 236 non-downtown stations, with an average of 19 weekday boardings.

Like many Metra Electric stations, Stewart Ridge is little more than a pre-fabricated shelter on an elevated platform. No parking or bus service is available at this station.
