= Ashland/Calumet Park station =

Commuter rail station in Calumet Park, Illinois

Ashland/Calumet Park

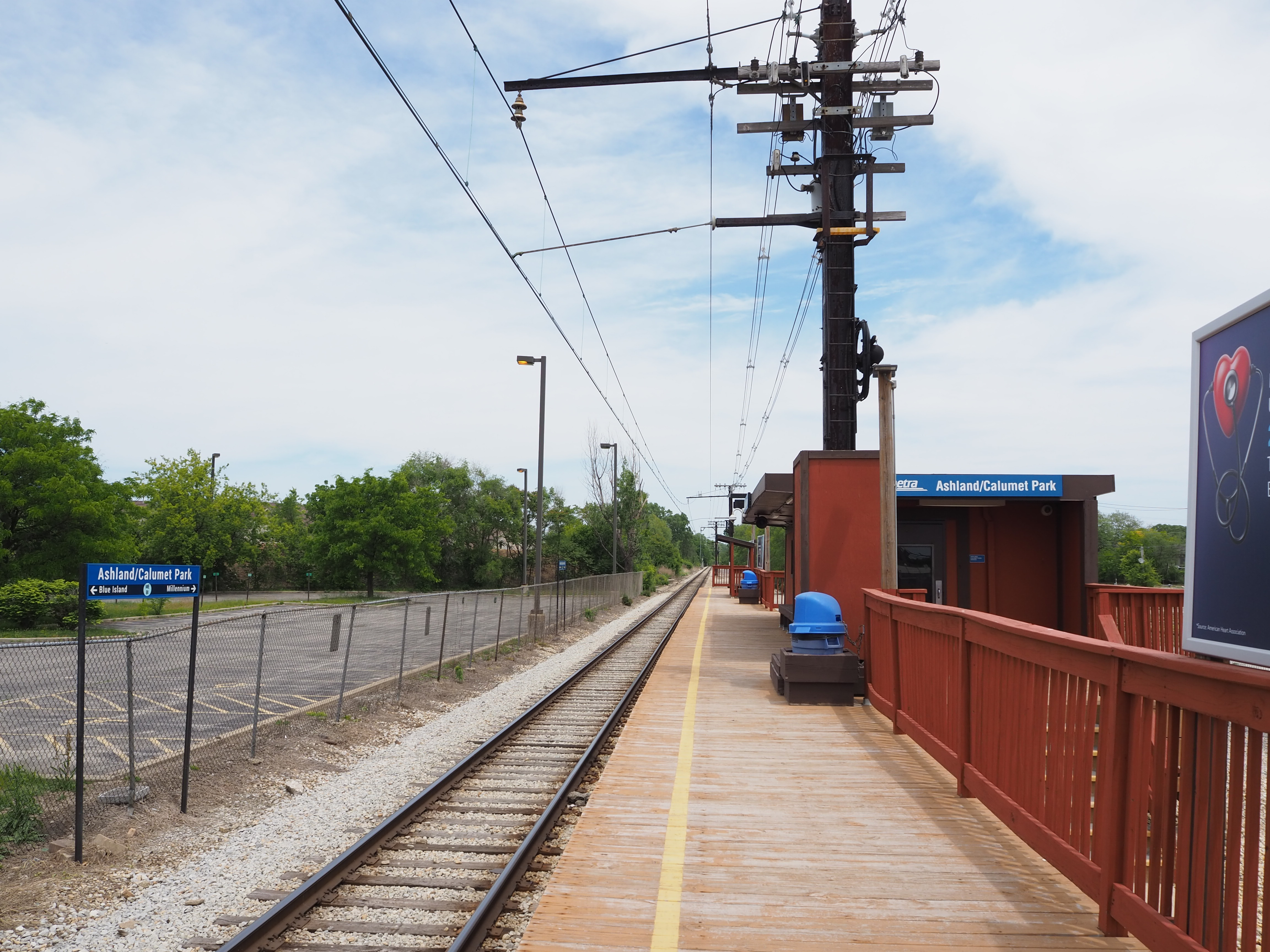

General information
- Location: Ashland Avenue near 124th Street; Calumet Park, Illinois
- Coordinates: 41.6693°N 87.6606°W
- Owner: Metra
- Line: Blue Island Subdistrict
- Platforms: 1 side platform
- Tracks: 1

Construction
- Parking: Yes
- Accessible: No

Other information
- Fare zone: 2

History
- Electrified: 1926
- Former names: Ashland Avenue

Passengers
- 2018: 97 (average weekday) ▼12.6%
- Rank: 190 out of 236

Services
Preceding station	Metra	Following station
Burr Oak toward Blue Island	Metra Electric Blue Island Branch	Racine Avenue toward Millennium
Former services
Preceding station	Illinois Central Railroad	Following station
Burr Oak toward Blue Island	Electric Suburban Blue Island Branch	Racine Avenue toward Randolph Street
Track layout
Location

Ashland/Calumet Park (formerly Ashland Avenue) is a commuter rail station along the Blue Island Branch of the Metra Electric line in Calumet Park, Illinois. The station is located on Ashland Avenue near 124th Street, and is 17.9 miles (28.8 km) away from the northern terminus at Millennium Station. In Metra's zone-based fare system, Ashland Avenue is in zone 2. As of 2018, Ashland Avenue is the 190th busiest of Metra's 236 non-downtown stations, with an average of 97 weekday boardings.

Parking is available across from the station south of the 123rd Street bridge over Interstate 57. Street-side parking is also available on the northwest and southwest corners of Ashland Avenue and 124th Street. No bus connections are available at this station.
