= Koreans in Chicago =

Asian community in Chicago

As of the 2020 there were approximately 70,814 Korean-origin people in Illinois, with the vast majority (approximately 62,000) in the Chicago metropolitan area. This makes Illinois the state with the eighth-largest Korean American population and the Chicago metropolitan area the fifth-largest, after Los Angeles, New York, Washington, and Seattle. As of 2006 the largest groups of Koreans are in Albany Park, North Park, West Ridge, and other communities near Albany Park. Many Koreans have since moved to northern and northwestern Chicago suburbs, including Glenview, Morton Grove, Mount Prospect, Niles, Northbrook, Schaumburg, and Skokie. A Koreatown, labeled "Seoul Drive", exists along Lawrence Avenue between Kedzie Avenue and Pulaski Road, albeit in diminished form. There were a number of Korean businesses on Clark Street in the 1970s, in Lakeview and Lincoln Park.

== History ==
Early immigration from Korea started when the first wave of Koreans moved to the United States in the early 1900s. This was because Koreans sought refuge from Japanese control. These immigrants landed in Hawaii to work on plantations. After being dissatisfied with the work, Koreans began to spread to California, New York, and Chicago. The 1910 U.S. census did not record any Koreans as living in the State of Illinois. In 1920, there were about 27 Koreans in Chicago, and that this figure increased to 64 in 1930. These Koreans had previously worked in plantations in Hawaii but moved to the mainland to work in a field not related to plantation work. In the 1930s Korean students discussed the independence movement during gatherings at the International House of the University of Chicago.

The Korean population's size remained constant during World War II. Due to a labor shortage, Koreans during World War II accumulated some capital. They used the capital to start small businesses. New economic opportunities that occurred during the war allowed some to open grocery stores and restaurants, which were the common forms of Korean small business. After the colonization of Korea ended in 1945, several Koreans in Chicago, including the bulk of the students, left. The bulk of the non-students stayed in Chicago. There were almost no Koreans who arrived in Chicago from 1945 to 1950.

In the late 1950s there were several dozen South Korean families in Chicago. In 1960 Chicago had 500 Koreans. The number of Koreans in Chicago increased after 1960, and between 1962 and 1972 the Korean population increased by twenty-fold due to revisions in immigration policies. The numbers of Koreans increased after the Immigration and Nationality Act of 1965 passed. In 1968 there were 2,000 Koreans. In 1970 there were 4,000 Koreans. In 1972 there were 10,000 Koreans. Students were a large group within the new Korean population, and many of them went on to become white collar professionals. Other significant groups included agricultural workers, coal miners, doctors, martial arts instructors, and nurses. The agricultural workers had previously migrated to South Africa before coming to Chicago, and the coal miners had previously migrated to West Germany. Koreans who had lived in other countries previously more easily adjusted to American life, and that there was competition among the former students and the Koreans who had lived in Germany. Those who had lived in West Germany mainly entered small business while the former students became professionals and "somewhat assimilated" by moving to the suburbs.

The U.S. Census Bureau estimated that 7,313 Koreans lived in the Chicago area in 1970. Of them, 60% were female. The War Brides Act caused a disproportionate number of Korean women to come to America. By the 1970s Korean settlements appeared in the area around Clark Street in the Lakeview and Lincoln Park areas: the Koreans found it easier to settle there since several Japanese had already settled in that area. During the 1970s many Koreans began moving further north to Edgewater, Rogers Park, and Uptown. Koreans working in healthcare fields stayed in Lakeview and Lincoln Park since those communities were in proximity to both the Korean businesses on Clark Street and the hospitals. Korean residential settlement was "more scattered" compared to earlier ethnic European residential settlement.

The 1980 estimates from the Census Bureau indicated 21,484 Koreans in Chicago . At this time, 53% were female. In the period the Korean businesses migrated to Lawrence Avenue. Korean residents originally referred to it as a "Second Clark Street". Several Korean residents moved to the Lawrence Avenue area and surrounding neighborhoods because the rental rates in Lawrence Avenue were relatively affordable. By the 1980s it became the primary Korean commercial area. The settlement of Koreans was "a scattering around the north side of the city, rather than a large pocket." Neighborhoods around Lawrence Avenue which had Korean settlement included Albany Park, Edgewater, Irving Park, Lincoln Square, Rogers Park, Uptown, West Ridge. In the 1980s, 80% of Chicago's Koreans resided in Albany Park, Edgewater, Irving Park, Lake View, Lincoln Park, North Park, Rogers Park, and West View.

From 1980 to 1990 the Chicago metropolitan area ethnic Korean population grew by 64% to 35,328 people. The Chicago metropolitan area had about 100,000 ethnic Koreans. The growth of Koreans was concentrated on Albany Park.

From 1990 to 2000 the Korean population grew by 28%. The Lawrence Avenue segment between Kedzie Avenue and Pulaski Avenue received the name "Seoul Drive" in 1993. Because suburbanization was beginning, some Korean Americans believe the area received its name too late. In several years leading to 2003, the number of Koreans arriving in Illinois had declined. In the period 1972–2000, 47,200 Koreans arrived in Illinois. Over 80% of them had arrived prior to 1990. Kiljoong Kim stated that Chicago may be "a transitory location for a sizeable number of Korean immigrants" because the cumulative number of Korean immigrants in Illinois between 1972 and 2000 is slightly larger than the 45,515 local Korean population as of 2000.

As Koreans began moving to the suburbs, they often chose areas based on the strength of the local public schools, so first-ring northern and northwestern suburbs that had good schools received more Koreans. These communities included Glenview, Lincolnwood, Morton Grove, Niles, Schaumburg, and Skokie. The Koreans became the only significant Asian ethnic group in Lake County. By the early 2000s Korean businesses began to leave the Lawrence Avenue area due to the decline of Koreans in the City of Chicago. As of the 2000 U.S. census, 24,321 Koreans lived in suburbs in the six-county Chicago region, and 10,011 Koreans lived in the City of Chicago. The 2002-2003 Korean Business Directory lists 122 businesses in the 847 area code corresponding to suburban communities and 53 businesses in the 312 area code and the 773 area code in the City of Chicago.

Migration patterns of Koreans to the United States began to level off as there was a decline in the need for middle class standards by moving to a new country. As more and more Koreans began to work in the states, the struggles they experienced in workspaces began to spread back to the country, some hardships being televised and starting riots in Korea (Min 1996).

== Geography ==
Koreans in the Chicago area have largely migrated from the traditional ports of entry on Chicago's North Side, such as Albany Park. Indeed, by 1991 Census observers had noted that 62% of Koreans in the metropolitan already lived outside of Chicago, the third largest share among Asian ethnicities after Indians (72%) and Japanese (64%).

In 2013 the Chicago Sun-Times reported that Korean businesses were "almost nonexistent" along Seoul Drive, and that the Korean businesses were also "disappearing" from the section of Bryn Mawr Avenue between Kedzie and Spaulding. The nucleus of the community today can be found in northwestern suburbs such as Niles, Glenview, and Morton Grove.

== Economics ==
In 2000, the Chicago Korean median household income exceeded $40,000. There are about 1,000 Korean-owned facilities including restaurants, martial arts centers, import trade stores, grocery stores, clothing stores, and wig stores. There are about 2,000 Korean-owned laundry and dry-cleaning stores. About 30% of the area Koreans are entrepreneurs or are self-employed.

The executive director of the Chicago Korean American Chamber of Commerce, Brandon Yu, stated that business owners found it easier to open businesses in the suburbs instead of the City of Chicago. To appeal to non-Koreans who want Korean food, some Korean business owners are opening restaurants in and near the Loop.

Many Korean stores are located in Korean and African-American neighborhoods. Some blacks believed that the Korean businessowners did not contribute to their communities and did not treat them fairly. There have been measures to improve black-Korean relations.

Diversey Cafeteria in Lake View was the first Korean business in Chicago. It opened in the 1920s. The first Korean restaurant, Sammee, opened in 1969 on Clark Street. It remained there until gentrification forced it to close in the 1990s. Today, the restaurant Rice 'n Bread is one of the last vestiges of the Korean and Japanese presence in Wrigleyville, serving up a fare of Korean buldak and kimchi tofu salad.

== Education ==
As of 2006 most Koreans have high levels of education. Many have bachelor's degrees.

== Media ==
Korean newspapers included the Chicago Sinbo, Chung'ang Ilbo, Han'guk Ilbo, and the Hangyore Sinmun.

The Korea Daily is based in Elk Grove Village.

== Institutions ==
In 2017, "Korean American Community Services, the area's oldest and largest Korean-American social service agency, and the Korean American Resource and Cultural Center, an advocacy organization", merged to form the Hana Center in Albany Park, Chicago.

The first Korean church opened in 1923. During the 1970s the churches were the only Korean ethnic institutions in the Chicago area which provided association opportunities and assistance to the Korean people.

The first Korean student organization opened in 1918. It was focused on the Korean independence issue and issues in Korea. Students founded the Korean American Association in 1962, and that was focused on issues of Koreans living in Chicago.

Social services agencies include the Korean American Community Services and the Korean American Senior Center.

The Korean Cultural Center of Chicago (KCCOC, 시카고 한인문화회관) is located in Wheeling, Illinois.

The Fellow Workers' Club opened in 1973.

Emulating the jimjilbangs of Korea, King Spa in Niles opened in 2010 and claims to be the largest Asian sauna in America. The spa operates 24-hours and includes nine co-ed sauna rooms as well as gender-segregated hot tubs, cold plunges, and saunas.

== People ==
- Sang-young Shin (Kim Chi)
