= Calumet Park, Illinois =

- Village
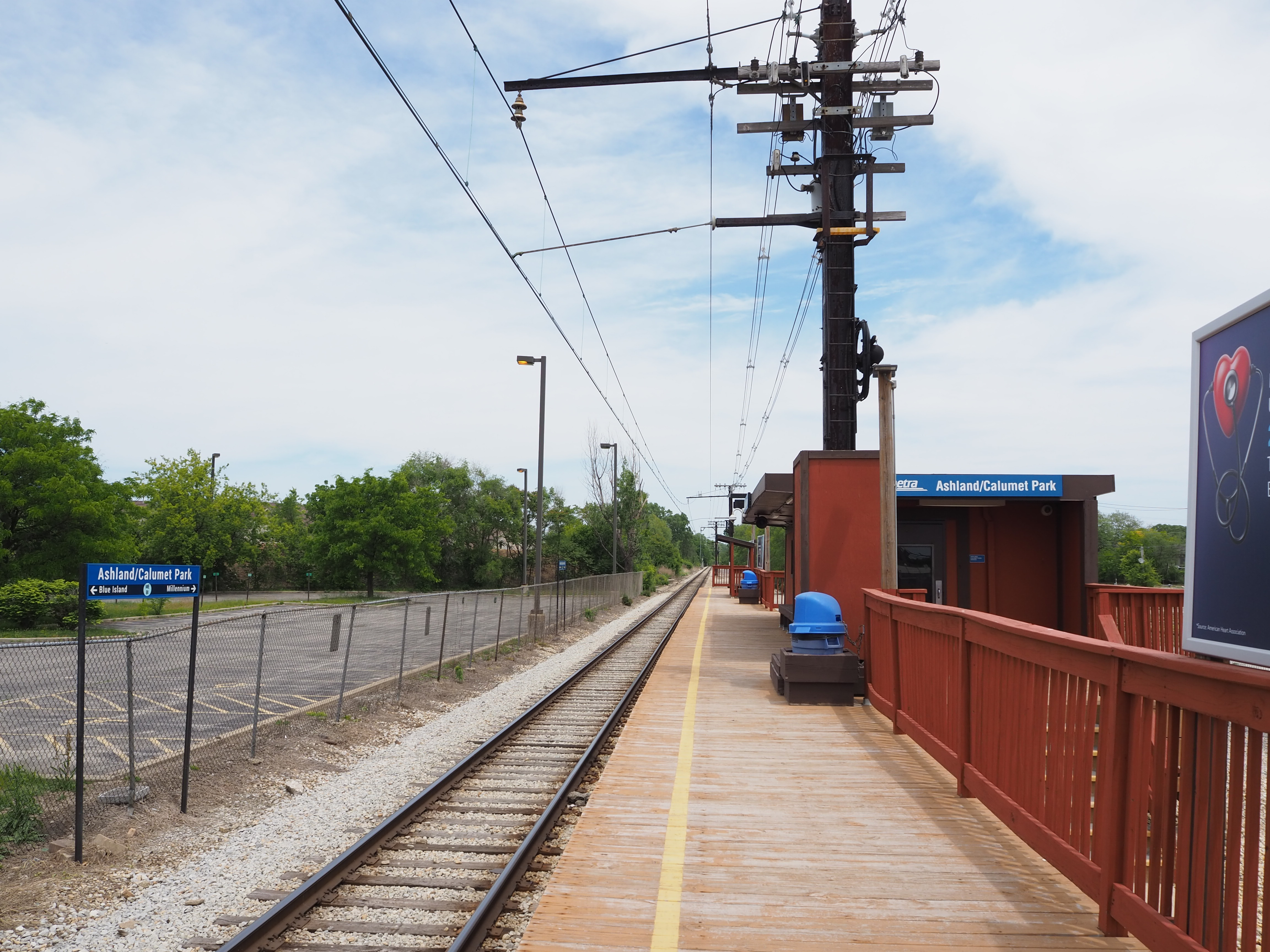
- Ashland/Calumet Park Metra station

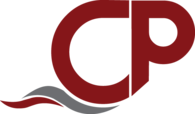
- logo

- Location of Calumet Park in Cook County, Illinois.

- Location within Greater Chicago Location within Illinois Location within the United States
- Coordinates: 41°39′56″N 87°39′29″W
- Country: United States
- State: Illinois
- County: Cook
- Township: Calumet
- Incorporated: 1912

Government
  - Type: Council–manager
  - Mayor: Ronald Denson

Area
  - Total: 1.15 sq mi (2.99 km^{2})
  - Land: 1.12 sq mi (2.89 km^{2})
  - Water: 0.035 sq mi (0.09 km^{2}) 3.48%

Population (2020)
  - Total: 7,025
  - Density: 6,288.2/sq mi (2,427.87/km^{2})

Standard of living (2007-11)
  - Per capita income: $24,204
  - Median home value: $141,900
- ZIP code(s): 60643, 60827
- Area code(s): 708
- Geocode: 17-10513
- FIPS code: 17-10513
- Website: www.villageofcalumetpark.org

Calumet Park (formerly DeYoung) is a village in Cook County, Illinois, United States. The population was 7,025 at the 2020 census. It is a south suburb of Chicago.

== History ==
On May 13, 2010, Mayor Joseph DuPar and the village board approved renaming 127th Street as Obama Drive, in honor of President Barack Obama. On August 21, 2010, State Senator Emil Jones III read a proclamation of the Illinois Senate in honor of the dedication on the same date. This road became the first Obama Drive in the country and the first road named after Obama in Illinois.

== Geography ==
Calumet Park is located at 41°39′56″N 87°39′29″W (41.665602, -87.658139).

According to the 2021 census gazetteer files, Calumet Park has a total area of 1.15 square miles (2.98 km^{2}), of which 1.12 square miles (2.90 km^{2}) (or 96.88%) is land and 0.04 square miles (0.10 km^{2}) (or 3.12%) is water.

== Demographics ==
Historical population
Census	Pop.	Note	%±
1920	1,237		—
1930	1,429		15.5%
1940	1,593		11.5%
1950	2,500		56.9%
1960	8,448		237.9%
1970	10,069		19.2%
1980	8,788		−12.7%
1990	8,418		−4.2%
2000	8,516		1.2%
2010	7,835		−8.0%
2020	7,025		−10.3%
U.S. Decennial Census; 2010 2020

=== Racial and ethnic composition ===
Calumet Park, Illinois – Racial and ethnic composition Note: the US Census treats Hispanic/Latino as an ethnic category. This table excludes Latinos from the racial categories and assigns them to a separate category. Hispanics/Latinos may be of any race.
Race / Ethnicity (NH = Non-Hispanic)	Pop 2000	Pop 2010	Pop 2020	% 2000	% 2010	% 2020
White alone (NH)	720	322	186	8.45%	4.11%	2.65%
Black or African American alone (NH)	7,036	6,893	6,230	82.62%	87.98%	88.68%
Native American or Alaska Native alone (NH)	13	6	9	0.15%	0.08%	0.13%
Asian alone (NH)	6	24	5	0.07%	0.31%	0.07%
Native Hawaiian or Pacific Islander alone (NH)	1	2	0	0.01%	0.03%	0.00%
Other race alone (NH)	9	6	37	0.11%	0.08%	0.53%
Mixed race or Multiracial (NH)	72	46	105	0.85%	0.59%	1.49%
Hispanic or Latino (any race)	659	536	453	7.74%	6.84%	6.45%
Total	8,516	7,835	7,025	100.00%	100.00%	100.00%

=== 2020 census ===
As of the 2020 census, Calumet Park had a population of 7,025 and 1,973 families.

The population density was 6,092.80 inhabitants per square mile (2,352.44/km^{2}), and the housing unit density was 2,666.09 per square mile (1,029.38/km^{2}).

The median age was 42.0 years. 20.8% of residents were under the age of 18 and 19.2% of residents were 65 years of age or older. For every 100 females there were 86.5 males, and for every 100 females age 18 and over there were 82.2 males age 18 and over.

100.0% of residents lived in urban areas, while 0.0% lived in rural areas.

There were 2,834 households in Calumet Park, of which 29.5% had children under the age of 18 living in them. Of all households, 25.8% were married-couple households, 23.0% were households with a male householder and no spouse or partner present, and 45.7% were households with a female householder and no spouse or partner present. About 32.9% of all households were made up of individuals and 12.4% had someone living alone who was 65 years of age or older.

There were 3,074 housing units, of which 7.8% were vacant. The homeowner vacancy rate was 2.4% and the rental vacancy rate was 10.4%.

=== Income and poverty ===
The median income for a household in the village was $50,049, and the median income for a family was $60,689. Males had a median income of $41,402 versus $32,665 for females. The per capita income for the village was $25,250. About 15.5% of families and 19.4% of the population were below the poverty line, including 24.5% of those under age 18 and 17.7% of those age 65 or over.

== Government ==
Calumet Park is located in Elementary School District #132, High School District #218, and Moraine Valley Community College District#524.

Calumet Park is divided between two congressional districts. The area east of Interstate 57 and south of 123rd Street is in Illinois' 2nd Congressional District; the rest of the village is part of the 1st Congressional District.

== Transportation ==
The Ashland/Calumet Park station provides Metra commuter rail service along the Blue Island branch of the Metra Electric District line. Trains travel north to Millennium station in Chicago and south to Blue Island.

Pace and CTA provide bus service connecting Calumet Park to destinations across the Southland.

== Notable people ==
- Marty Russo (born 1944), member of the United States House of Representatives from 1975 to 1993. He lived in Calumet Park at the time of his first election.
- Juice Wrld (1998–2019), rapper and singer-songwriter. He was a childhood resident of Calumet Park.
- Craig Robinson (born 1962), college basketball coach, former president of United States, Barack Obama's brother–in–law. Born in Calumet Park.
