= West Pullman, Chicago =

Community area in Chicago, Illinois

West Pullman
- Community area
- Community Area 53 - West Pullman
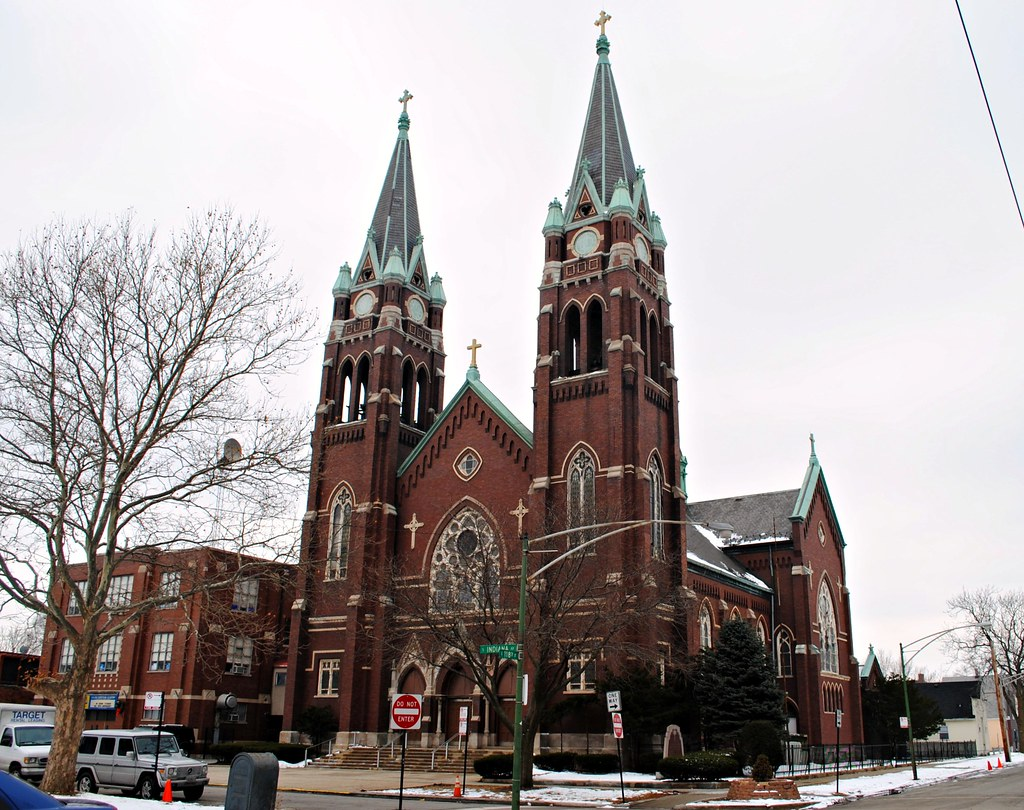
- St. Salomea Church (now Salem Baptist Church)

- Location within the city of Chicago
- Coordinates: 41°40.8′N 87°37.8′W
- Country: United States
- State: Illinois
- County: Cook
- City: Chicago
- Named for: George Pullman
- Neighborhoods: list: West Pullman; Kensington

Area
  - Total: 3.58 sq mi (9.27 km^{2})

Population (2024)
  - Total: 24,549
  - Density: 6,860/sq mi (2,650/km^{2})

Demographics 2024
  - White: 0.8%
  - Black: 88.6%
  - Hispanic: 8.6%
  - Asian: 0.2%
  - Other: 1.8%

Educational Attainment 2024
  - High School Diploma or Higher: 86.9%
  - Bachelor's Degree or Higher: 18.0%
- Time zone: UTC−6 (CST)
  - Summer (DST): UTC−5 (CDT)
- ZIP Codes: parts of 60628 and 60643
- Median income: $33,898
- Source: U.S. Census, Record Information Services

West Pullman is a neighborhood located on the far south side of the city of Chicago, Illinois. It is one of the 77 official community areas of Chicago. The neighborhood was initially inhabited by workers of the Pullman Train Company looking to escape the grip of the company town, but soon swelled with industrial workers of all stripes. The commercial corridor of Kensington/115th Street was one of many Italian communities within Chicago, and now hosts a Hispanic enclave.

It is bounded on the north by 115th Street, on the east by the former Illinois Central Railroad, on the south by the Calumet River and Riverdale, on the west by Calumet Park, Blue Island and Ashland Avenue.

== Demographics ==
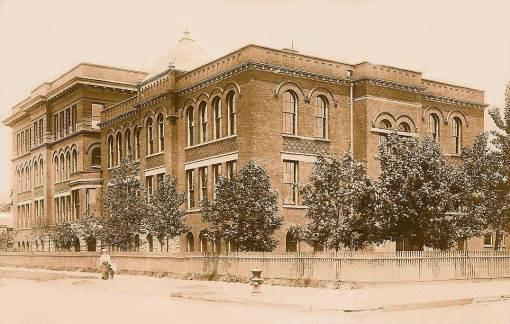
West Pullman School

According to a June 2017 analysis by the Chicago Metropolitan Agency for Planning, there were 27,982 people and 9,058 households in West Pullman. From 2000 to 2015, the area lost more than 20% of its residents. The racial makeup of the area was 1% White, 93.39% African American, 0.24% Asian, 0.54% from other races. Residents who identify as Hispanic or Latino of any race were 4.83% of the population. The age distribution was 29.7% under the age of 19, 19.3% from 20 to 34, 17.7% from 35 to 49, 18.5% from 50 to 64, and 14.8% 65 or older. The median age was 35 years. The median income is $33,898.

Historical population
Census	Pop.	Note	%±
1930	28,474		—
1940	27,834		−2.2%
1950	29,265		5.1%
1960	35,397		21.0%
1970	40,278		13.8%
1980	44,904		11.5%
1990	39,846		−11.3%
2000	36,649		−8.0%
2010	34,759		−5.2%
2020	26,104		−24.9%

== History ==
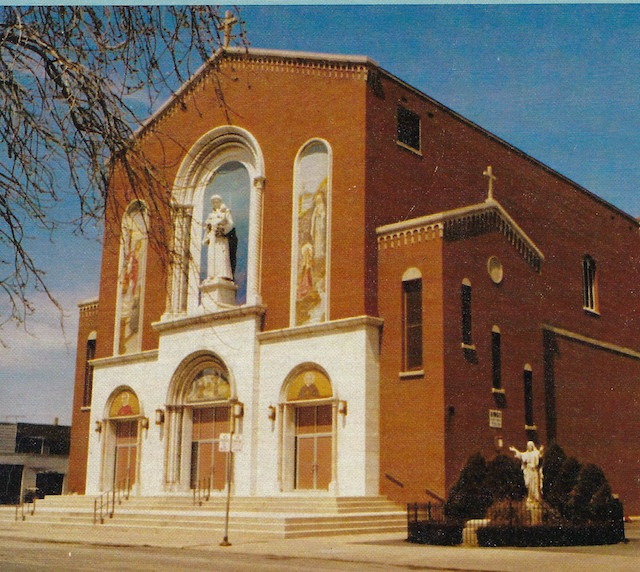
St. Anthony Catholic Church Erected in 1903 - "Old Italian Community of Kensington."

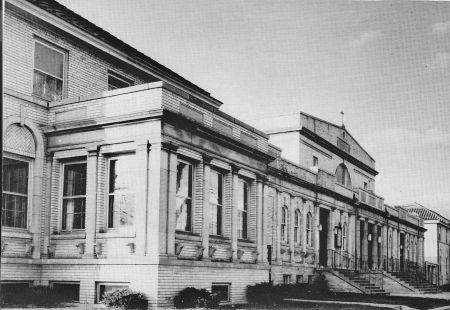
St. Catherine of Genoa Erected in 1893 - W 118th and S. Lowe

After the expulsion of the Potawatomi as part of the 1833 Treaty of Chicago, the area that is now West Pullman was settled by westbound settlers. In the 1880s, real estate speculators created the West Pullman Land Association to develop land between Wentworth and Ashland Avenues. The Association was successful in industrial development, and later residential development before the Panic of 1893, the Pullman Strike of 1894 dealt an economic blow that resulted in bankruptcy.

Like many of Chicago's community areas, West Pullman consists of multiple smaller communities. The oldest of these was Kensington, founded in 1852 at the junction of the Illinois Central and Michigan Central railroads. Nicknamed "Bumtown", the commercial district around Kensington station was frequented by residents of neighboring Pullman, a dry town. The second of these communities was the village of Gano. The area of Gano was populated by Pullman workers who desired to own their own homes and escape from the corporate control of George Pullman's company town. Many ethnic groups called the area home, including Italians, Poles, Hungarians, Lithuanians, Ukrainians, Armenians, many of whom built houses of worship and cultural centers, like St. Michael Ukrainian Catholic Church.

The Pullman Company shut down in 1968, dealing a major blow to the entire area. Further deindustrialization, combined with suburban development, led to a similar racial turnover in West Pullman as occurred in much of the South Side; the neighborhood was 99.8% white in 1960 and 94% black in 1980.

== Economy ==
Located along several major railways and the Calumet Sag Channel, West Pullman was and remains a mostly blue collar community. Much of the heavy industry the area relied on disappeared in the late 20th century, and it lags behind the rest of Chicago economically. West Pullman has an unemployment rate of 19.9%, compared to a city-wide rate of 8.4%. Habitat for Humanity has built and is continuing to build homes in the community.

West Pullman has worked to clean up and rehabilitate old industrial sites. With the help of the EPA, community organizers managed to turn a brownfield into a community garden.

West Pullman is also home to the largest urban photovoltaic solar plant in the United States. The 10 MW plant utilizes 32,800 SunPower solar panels, spans 39 acres (160,000 m^{2}), and generates enough power to supply energy to approximately 1500 homes in the Midwest. It is owned and operated by Exelon and came online in early 2010.

== Parks ==
West Pullman Park - Indoor Pool

Kensington Park - Basketball Court with Seating. Playground equipment.

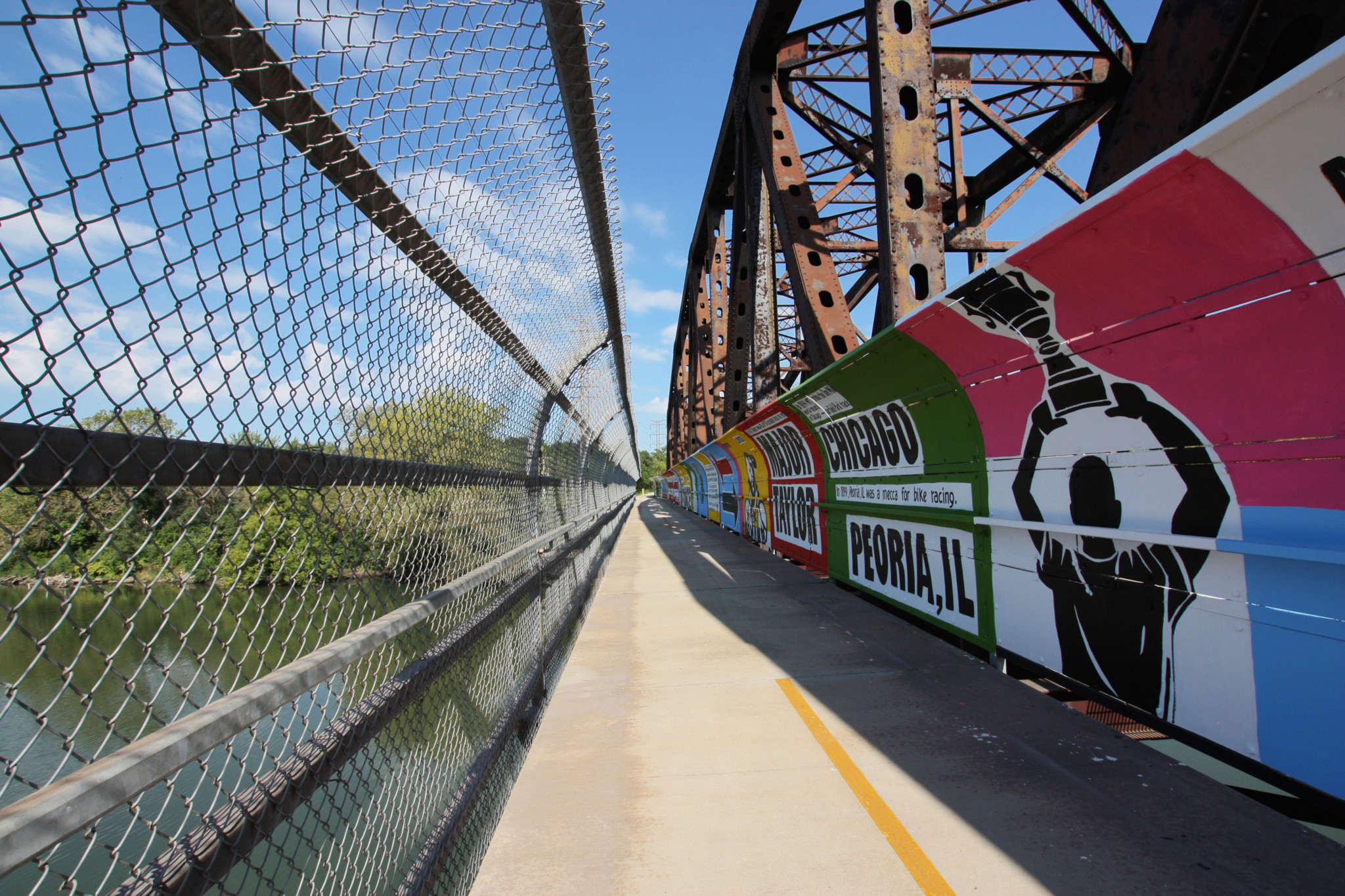
Major Taylor Trail Bridge Over the River Crossing from West Pullman to Riverdale.

Major Taylor Trail - 6 Miles

Gano Park

Morgan Field Park

Cooper Park (Jack Leroy)

== Sports / Community Facilities ==
Salvation Army Ray & Joan Kroc Community Center Corps

Lion's Field Kroc Community Center

== Healthcare ==
According to the Pritzker School of Medicine, fourteen percent (14%) of the West Pullman population is uninsured, though ninety-two percent (92%) report having a consistent primary care provider. The obesity rate is fifty-three percent (53%).

== Politics ==
West Pullman is a stronghold of the Democratic Party. In the 2016 presidential election, West Pullman cast 12,473 votes for Hillary Clinton and cast 217 votes Donald Trump. It was Clinton's 11th largest margin of victory in the 76 community areas she won. In the 2012 presidential election, West Pullman cast 14,496 votes for Barack Obama and 86 votes for Mitt Romney. It was Obama's 8th largest margin of victory in the 76 community areas he won.

At the local level, West Pullman is located in Chicago's 9th and 34th wards represented by Democrats Anthony Beale and Carrie Austin respectively.

== Transportation ==
West Pullman is home to four stations on the Metra Electric District's Blue Island branch; Racine, State Street, Stewart Ridge, and West Pullman. Main line Electric District trains stop at Kensington station, just across the community's northern boundary. Red Ahead, a program to extend the Red Line south to 130th Street, would result in a new station at Michigan Avenue in West Pullman.

== Improvement Projects ==
Habitat For Humanity is interjecting single-family homes throughout the neighborhood for improvement.

Cottage Grove Ave is being extended Southbound from E 115th St. to E 130th St. with light and visual improvements.

E 115th St. and S. Cottage Grove Ave will see train station improvements along with retail improvements.

== Notable people ==
- Robert A. Clifford (born 1950 or 1951), trial lawyer notable for representing Rachel Barton Pine in her lawsuit against Metra and representing the families of the victims of the respective Alaska Airlines Flight 261 and American Eagle Flight 4184 crashes. He was raised in West Pullman near 121st Street and South Laflin Street.
- Ed Derwinski (1926–2012), 1st United States Secretary of Veterans Affairs. He resided at 12109 South Parnell Avenue during his time as a Congressman.
- Arthur Swanson (1926–2010), member of the Illinois Senate from 1963 to 1971. He resided at 12556 South Harvard Avenue while serving as a legislator.
