= Virginia C. Bulat =

American historian

Virginia Catherine Bulat (Carroll), 1963.

Virginia Catherine Bulat, the pen and maiden name of Virginia Bulat Carroll (23 March 1938 – 21 December 1986), was an independent scholar and historian of local Illinois history. Bulat was born in Chicago, Illinois and attended Nazareth Academy in La Grange, Illinois (1952–1956).

Bulat was the daughter of Edmund Peter Bulat, winner of the 1933 State of Illinois middleweight Golden Gloves amateur boxing championship.

Bulat worked in the publishing industry in Chicago in the early 1960s. She later became an amateur archaeologist and worked for the U.S. Geological Survey and the U.S. State Department. Bulat was a third-generation American of Austrian-Polish heritage. The surname Bulat makes reference to bulat steel. In 1963, she married James B. Carroll, a career U.S. diplomat and graduate of the University of Notre Dame. She was the mother of four children (Margaret Mary, James Edmund, Mary Elizabeth and Patrick Braerton).

== Preserving Illinois History ==
As a high school student Bulat began interviewing elderly residents in the vicinity of Lyons, Illinois and Riverside, Illinois. Many had recollections of the region before it became part of the western suburbs of Chicago. Notes from these interviews and early photos were published in collaboration with Rose Marie Benedditi in the books Lyons: A history of a village and area important for 300 years (1959) and Portage, pioneers, and pubs: A history of Lyons, Illinois (1963).

Both books prominently feature Hofmann Tower, a landmark on the Des Plaines River between the towns of Lyons and Riverside, Illinois. George Hofmann, Jr., a local brewer built a dam on the Des Plaines River to generate electricity. He also built the adjacent tower as part of park that attracted visitors to picnic and ride boats. In the 1970s and 1980s, co-author Rose Marie Benedetti worked closely with the preservation efforts of the Village of Lyons Historical Commission to have Hofmann Tower designated a village and state landmark and placed on the National Register of Historic Places.

== Bibliography ==
- Benedetti, Rose Marie and Virginia C. Bulat, Lyons: A history of a village and area important for 300 years. Riverside, Ill: Riverside News, 1959.
- Benedetti, Rose Marie and Virginia C. Bulat, Portage, pioneers, and pubs: A history of Lyons, Illinois. Chicago, Illinois, 1963. Found at Chicago History Museum website, and cited in Edward T . Bilek, Jr., The Old Chicago Portage: 1673 - 1836 (June 25, 1967) found at NPS history website
