= Brookfield Enterprise =

- Type: Weekly newspaper
- Owner: Elmer C. Johnson
- Founder: Porter Reubendall
- Managing editor: Denny C. Johnson
- Founded: December 9, 1932
- Ceased publication: October 8, 1985
- Language: English
- City: Brookfield, Illinois
- Country: United States
- Circulation: 50,000 (as of 1975–79)
- OCLC number: 31192077

Parameters The Brookfield Enterprise was a weekly community newspaper based out of the Chicago suburb of Brookfield, Illinois. The newspaper, under the ownership of Elmer C. Johnson, would go on to be merged with three other local newspapers (The Lyons Times, Summit Valley Times, & Clear Ridge Times) and be known under the masthead of The Times.

== History ==
The Brookfield Enterprise was started in 1932 by former linotype operator and publisher of The Melrose Parker newspaper Porter Reubendall as a weekly paper full of advertisements of Brookfield businesses. The paper was to be distributed for free to every home in Brookfield, as well as, the Hollywood & Congress Park sections of Brookfield. The first issue of the Brookfield Enterprise was printed, on a printing press that could only print 12 x 15 in. paper, on Dec., 9, 1932 in the small basement of Reubendall's home at 9125 Sheridan Ave. in Brookfield, IL..

Distribution of the paper was handled by a group of men sent over from the local work relief office and the paper itself was initially assembled as a family effort with "Mama, the children and the in-laws" helping out according to Reubendall.

While the first issue of the newspaper was about business and advertising-orientated, Reubendall soon decided that he would include small news stories and information concerning Brookfield's governmental affairs.

By 1936, the Brookfield Enterprise was printing 3,000 copies a week out of its new offices at 3724 Prairie Ave. in Brookfield. The paper had been so well received that it was necessary for Reubendall to invest in a larger Babcock Printing Press to handle the work.

With the onset of World War II, the military draft had begun to cut into his male workforce and according to Reubendall, "it became necessary for me to work every evening, and it became quite a burden." So, in January 1945 Reubendall sold the paper to Robert Hladik and Lawrence Morrell Gross. Soon after the sale the paper began to falter.

In September 1945, Elmer C. Johnson, then a printer's apprentice and freelance photographer for the Chicago Daily News, Chicago Tribune and in the early 1930s a writer of the weekly columns "On the Funny Side" & Radio Ramblings" in the South Side News was hired as managing editor of the Brookfield Enterprise.

In January 1947, Mr. Gross sold his interest in the paper to Mr. Hladik and Mr. Johnson then bought a half-interest in the paper. By 1949, Elmer C. Johnson and his wife Genevieve bought out Mr. Hladik's half of the paper and became sole owners of the Brookfield Enterprise.

In the 1950s the Brookfield Enterprise, now owned by photographer Elmer C. Johnson, became billed as "Brookfield's Picture Newspaper" and as "A Picture News-Weekly. It was also at this time that the newspaper began to focus on hard news as well as community and governmental news.

In 1951, Mr. Johnson acquired the Lyons Times, Summit Valley Times and the Clear Ridge Times publishing them all under the name Enterprise Publications.

Elmer C. Johnson (who carried his Rolleiflex camera everywhere he went) worked as publisher, editor, writer and photographer for the paper. Writing stories on a second-hand typewriter that he bought in Oak Park, Illinois, which was, according to the shop's owner, previously owned by writer Ernest Hemingway. Whether the proprietor's claim was true or not, it did make for a good story.

In 1958, Johnson moved the Enterprise to a new office at 9034 Brookfield Ave. in Brookfield, Illinois and then again in 1960 he moved to a much larger office at 8694 W. 47th St. in Lyons, Illinois.

In 1967, Elmer C. Johnson's photo of the deadly tornado (an F4) that hit Oak Lawn, Illinois, and left a trail of destruction eastward to Lake Michigan, appeared with a title "Portrait of a Killer" on the front page of the Chicago American and in special sections of the Chicago Tribune & Chicago Sun-Times. The National Weather Service says that it is "the only known tornado photo of this event".

Johnson took the photo of the tornado while at the Southfield shopping center to pick up an ad from a store for his Enterprise Publication. According to a story in the Chicago American, Johnson, who always had his camera in his car, saw the tornado forming and ran to his car from where he took the photograph. Of the photo, Johnson said "I opened the lens way up and shot. It was moving so fast I kept losing the funnel behind the buildings."

Between 1975 and 1979, the four newspaper editions published by Enterprise Publications and now under the masthead of The Times, were reduced to two editions covering Lyons Township and Garfield Ridge with a circulation of 50,000.

Beginning in the 1970s, The Times was billed as having "More photos and local news" and included a contest that included a reader winning money if their car was spotted with a Times bumper sticker on the bumper. The bumper sticker read "In our town it's The Times- an Enterprise Publication."

In 1979, Elmer's son and managing editor of The Times Denny C. Johnson, moved the paper from free distribution to a paid subscription and newsstand sales operation. By 1983 the paper had roughly 5,000 subscribers and 500 weekly newsstand sales. The papers operations were now being run out of an office at the former Old Willow shopping complex in Willow Springs, Illinois.

However, on Oct. 8, 1985, subscribers and advertisers received a letter that stated

"No Times this week! Sorry but after more than 52 years of service to the community, Enterprise Publications Co. is temporarily suspending publication of The Times' Lyons Township edition, so we can reorganize our operations."

The letter went on to say,

"Due to the increased costs of printing, mailing, labor and other expenses, we are forced to take this action. Paid subscriptions will be honored and dated up when we resume publication. Please bear with us during this period. Sincerely, The Times, Enterprise Publication Co."

And the paper ceased publication.

== Awards ==
- (1982) First Place in the Spot News Photography category by the Illinois Press Association.
- (1979) First Place in Circulation Promotion Idea by the Illinois Press Association.
- (1982/1980) Honorable Mentions in Feature News & Promotion Idea by the Illinois Press Association.
- Also awards by the Illinois Ethnic Commission, The American Red Cross, The American Cancer Society & the Summit, Illinois Fraternal Order of Police.

== Staff ==
- Porter Ruebendall died on December 21, 1961, at the home of his daughter Valliere Onstad in Mountain View, California, at the age of 86.
- Elmer C. Johnson, after the closing down of the newspaper, went on to work briefly selling real estate, writing and continued to take photographs. One of his Brookfield Enterprise-era photographs was published in the Mike Corbitt book Double Deal. He died November 26, 2003, at his home in Orland Park, Illinois, at the age of 90.
- Denny C. Johnson, after the closing of the newspaper went on to do freelance writing and photography for many newspapers across the country including USA Today the National Enquirer. He also self-published many short stories and a book titled The Oaxaca Connection. A photograph from his Times photography was published in Mike Corbitt's book Double Deal. He died June 14, 2004, at MacNeal Hospital in Berwyn, Illinois, at the age of 57.
