= Hofmann Tower =

- U.S. National Register of Historic Places
- Illinois State Historic Site
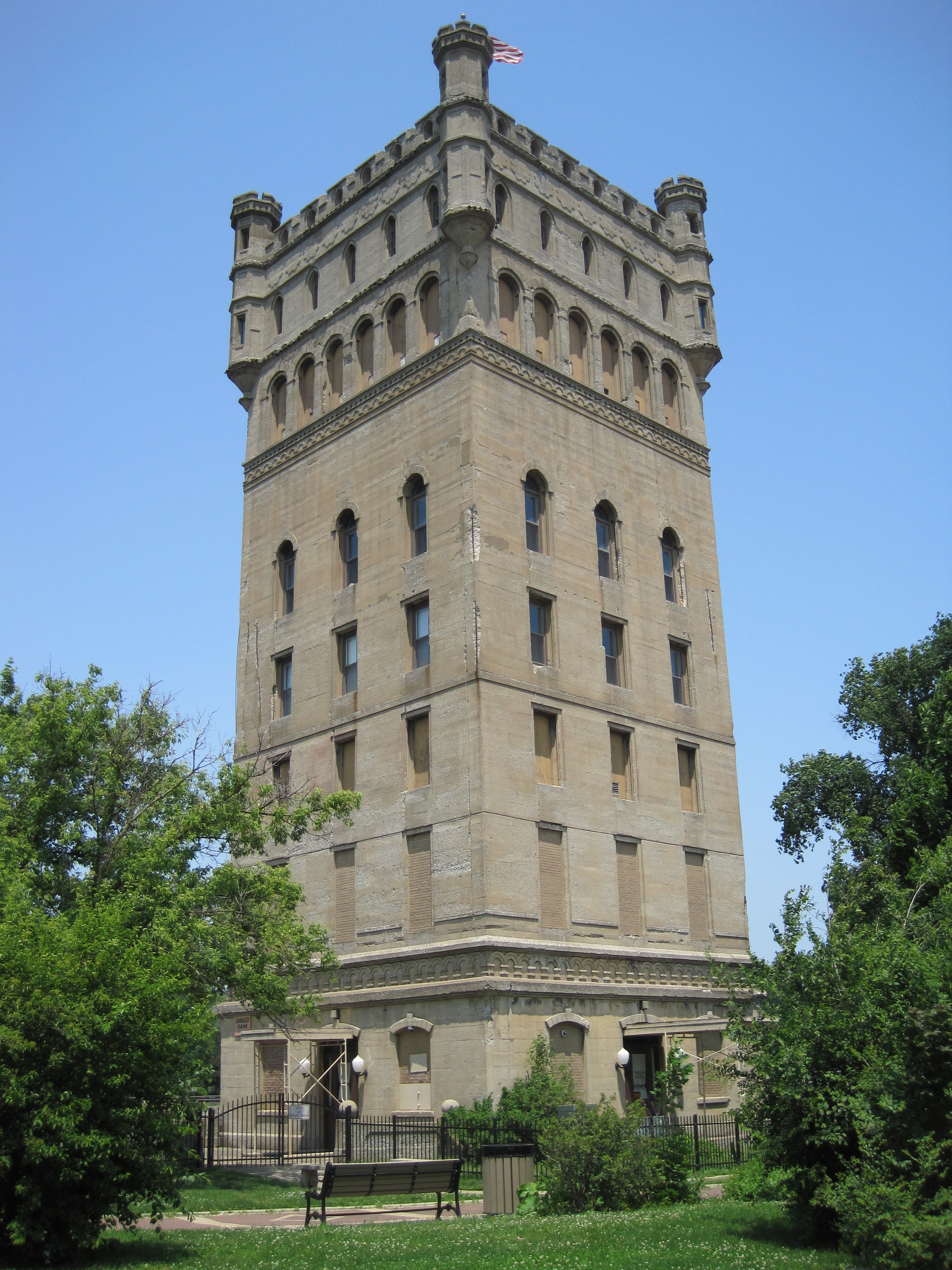
- Hofmann Tower in 2011

- Location within Illinois Location within the United States
- Location: 3910 Barry Point Rd., Lyons, Illinois
- Coordinates: 41°49′14″N 87°49′19″W
- Area: less than one acre
- Built: 1908
- Architect: Sauber, H.W., Construction Co.
- NRHP reference No.: 78001139
- Added to NRHP: December 22, 1978

Hofmann Tower is a tower in Lyons, Illinois. Built in 1908, it is named after local brewer George Hofmann Jr., who built the tower and a neighboring dam as part of a park that attracted visitors to picnic and ride boats. The tower was added to the National Register of Historic Places on December 22, 1978.

Hofmann's heirs sold the tower to the Forest Preserve District of Cook County in 1946. In the 1970s, Rose Marie Benedetti and Maureen S. Kiener worked closely with the Village of Lyons Historical Commission to have Hofmann Tower designated a village and state landmark and placed on the National Register of Historic Places.

As of 2024 the tower is closed to the public due to its deteriorating condition.

Hofmann Tower is featured prominently in two books written by Rose Marie Benedetti and Virginia C. Bulat, titled Lyons: A history of a village and area important for 300 years (1959) and Portage, pioneers, and pubs: A history of Lyons, Illinois (1963).

== Hofmann Dam ==
The tower's site was originally a natural dam on the Des Plaines River that was known as the Riverside Ford, which was used extensively by Native Americans and early white settlers as a primary river crossing. The dam was formed by a limestone shelf that, at the end of the last Ice Age, marked the shores of Lake Chicago. In 1827, a man-made dam was built at this location by the Laughton Brothers for use by the first saw mill in Northeastern Illinois; that mill closed in 1839. In 1866, Fox Brothers purchased the site for a new grist mill, for use by the Riverside Milling Company. Around that time, Frederick Law Olmsted, who had been hired with his partner Calvert Vaux to develop a planned community north and west of the river — it would become the village of Riverside — encountered the dam and envisioned it as a site for a recreation area.

In 1907, Hofmann acquired the dam and made subsequent improvements to it while developing the area for an amusement park called Niagara Park. He replaced the mill dam with a new horseshoe-shaped concrete dam at the same spot. Chicago's booming population and the resulting sewage runoff into the Des Plaines River led to pollution and environmental issues that, together with Prohibition in the United States, led to the closing of Hofmann's park.

To address the environmental issues, a by-pass was added to the north bank of the river in 1928 and a Works Progress Administration project sought to strengthen the dam in 1936. Finally in 1950, due to continuing sanitation and pollution concerns, Hofmann's dam was replaced with a new one a short distance downstream. In 2012, that 1950 dam was removed, revealing a portion of the 1908 dam, which was also removed later that year.
