= Congress Park =

Congress Park could refer to:

- Canfield Casino and Congress Park, in Saratoga Springs, New York
- Congress Park, Denver, a neighborhood in Denver, Colorado
- Congress Park station, a train station in Brookfield, Illinois
- a park in Gothenburg, Sweden
