= The Galloping Ghost =

The Galloping Ghost may refer to:

== People ==
- Red Grange (1903–1991), American football player
- Norm Perry (Canadian football) (1904–1957), Canadian football player
- Brian Bevan (1924–1991), legendary rugby league winger

== Other uses ==
- The Galloping Ghost (aircraft), a destroyed P-51 Mustang air racer
- Buford and the Galloping Ghost, a 1978 cartoon
- The Galloping Ghost (serial), a 1931 movie serial
- USS Enterprise (CV-6), a 1936 American aircraft carrier during World War II
- Galloping Ghost Arcade, a video arcade in Brookfield, Illinois
