= Tom Baugh =

American football player (born 1963)

No. 58, 64
- Position: Center

Personal information
- Born: December 1, 1963 (age 62); Chicago, Illinois, U.S.
- Listed height: 6 ft 3 in (1.91 m)
- Listed weight: 274 lb (124 kg)

Career information
- High school: Riverside Brookfield (Riverside, Illinois)
- College: Southern Illinois
- NFL draft: 1986: 4th round, 87th overall pick

Career history
- Kansas City Chiefs (1986–1988); Cleveland Browns (1989)

Career NFL statistics
- Games played: 45
- Games started: 16
- Fumble recoveries: 2
- Stats at Pro Football Reference

Thomas Anthony Baugh (born December 1, 1963) is an American former professional football player who was a center for four seasons with two teams in the National Football League (NFL).

A 1981 graduate of Riverside Brookfield High School, Baugh played college football for the Southern Illinois Salukis where he was a key member of the 1983 NCAA Division I-AA national football championship squad. Baugh played in the East-West Shrine Bowl and the Blue–Gray Football Classic following his senior year when he was captain of the 1985 Southern Illinois Salukis and a fourth round draft pick of the Kansas City Chiefs in 1986. In his NFL career, he played center for the Kansas City Chiefs for three seasons starting in 1986. Baugh finished his playing career in 1989 with the Cleveland Browns. Baugh was called by his former Chiefs coach Frank Ganz Sr. in 1990 to play for the Detroit Lions. During a preseason game Tom suffered a concussion and was released. Concussion related issues lingered in Baugh's life beyond his NFL playing days and he was written about in a John McDermott article of MEL Magazine titled "The NFL's Forgotten Retirees"

Tom Baugh is a member of the NFL Players Association. He served as the membership director and treasurer of the Kansas City Chapter of the National Football League Alumni Association. Tom was elected to the NFL Alumni Association Board of Directors and as Secretary/Treasurer of the Association by his NFL Alumni peers. Tom along with Carl Mauck and David Carter resigned from their posts as Retiree Advocacy Directors following some questionable reorganization, and the Leagues renewal of the Logo Trust Agreement.

Baugh resides in Lone Jack, Missouri where he was elected to serve the community on the Lone Jack C-6 School Board. He is a member of the Salvation Army Team Emergency Radio Network and is an FCC Federal Communications Commission licensed Amateur radio operator (AE9B) using all modes of communication including Morse code. Tom also volunteered at Saint Luke's Hospital of Kansas City and was a committee member of the Paint the Town Activity celebrating Kansas City's long tradition of the Arts. He also visits Children's Mercy Hospital, volunteering time visiting with the children.

Tom is currently President of KC Constructors, Inc. an Award-winning construction business. KC Constructors is a 2012,13,14,15,16,17,18,19,20,21,22,23,24 member of the Lee's Summit Chamber of Commerce nominated for the "2019 Truly the Best Award"

In 2002, he was selected to the SIU Saluki Hall of Fame In 2013, he was selected to the SIU Saluki All-Century Team In 2023, he was inducted to the SIU Saluki Hall of Fame

Tom spent several years teaching Automotive Technology to teenagers in Elmhurst, Illinois, at York Community High School, where he was also the track and field teams shot put and discus coach. He was released in 1998 over a disagreement about opportunities for the students in his classes. He had arranged for students to work in a local body shop alongside experienced body men, and he sent the students two at a time every Friday. The school, however, disapproved of the arrangement.
