= Pinball Expo =

Pinball convention in Illinois

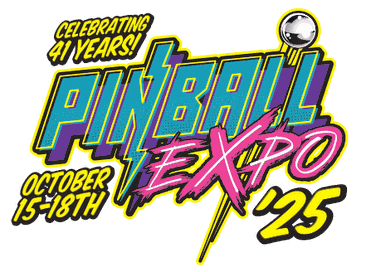
- Genre: Pinball and Arcade Game Show
- Frequency: Annually
- Location: Renaissance Schaumburg Convention Center Hotel
- Years active: 41
- Inaugurated: 22–24 November 1985
- Founder: Robert "Rob" Berk
- Most recent: 15–19 October 2024
- Next event: 15–18 October 2025
- Area: Schaumburg, Illinois
- Website: http://www.pinballexpo.com/

Pinball Expo is an event that is held annually in the Chicago area, the original home of most pinball manufacturers. The event attracts pinball industry professionals, pinball players, collectors, and enthusiasts from around the world. Founded by Robert "Rob" Berk, of Warren, Ohio, the event was inaugurated over the weekend of November 22–24, 1985 at the Holiday Inn O'Hare/Kennedy in Rosemont, IL. At the 33rd Pinball Expo, on Saturday, October 14, 2017, Twin Galaxies founder Walter Day made a presentation on behalf of Guinness World Records, issuing a Guinness award that recognized Pinball Expo as history's "longest-running pinball event."

== Development ==
Founded in 1985, Pinball Expo is the longest-running event dedicated to pinball. It was conceived in 1984 by Robert "Rob" Berk of Warren, Ohio, to honor his heroes of the pinball industry; the artists and designers. With the assistance of Bill Kurtz of Cleveland, Ohio, and later Mike Pacak of Canfield, Ohio, the trio held their first event over the weekend of November 22–24, 1985 at the Holiday Inn O'Hare/Kennedy in Rosemont, Illinois. The inaugural event attracted around 100 attendees from around the world and a dozen vendors.

The expo offers a tour of a pinball factory, an autograph session, tournaments, and an exhibit hall of pinball machines and related paraphernalia. There are seminars featuring well-known pinball experts. Attendees can also participate in a pinball tournament called "Flip Out".

On October 26, 1991, Pinball Expo launched Pinball Expo's Hall of Fame and inducted its first class of pinball luminaries: David Gottlieb, Ray Moloney, Sam Stern, and Harry E. Williams. The event is open to the general public.

By 1998, the Pinball Expo had grown to feature more than 200 machines available to play on the show floor.

== Pinball World Premieres held at Pinball Expo ==
As one of the most prestigious pinball events in the world, Pinball Expo has been chosen by many pinball manufacturers as the site for official "world premieres" of new pinball titles. Among the games released at Pinball Expo are:

Year	Pinball Title	Manufacturer	Ref.
1985	Loch Ness Monster	Game Plan	
1987	Laser War	Data East	
1988	Baby In The Hole	Data East	
1990	King Kong	Data East	
2014	Full Throttle	Heighway Pinball	
2016	Dialed In!	Jersey Jack Pinball	
2016	Alien	Heighway Pinball	
2016	Batman 66	Stern Pinball, Inc.	
2016	The Big Lebowski	Dutch Pinball	
2017	Pirates of the Caribbean	Jersey Jack Pinball	
2018	Oktoberfest: Pinball on Tap	American Pinball	
2019	Elvira's House of Horrors	Stern Pinball, Inc.	
2019	Cosmic Carnival	Suncoast Pinball	
2022	Queen	Pinball Brothers	
2022	Toy Story 4	Jersey Jack Pinball	
2022	Magic Girl	Zidware/American Pinball	
2023	Pulp Fiction	Chicago Gaming	
2023	Galactic Tank Force	American Pinball	
2023	Elton John	Jersey Jack Pinball	
2024	The Uncanny X-Men	Stern Pinball, Inc.	
2024	Metallica Remastered	Stern Pinball, Inc.	
2024	Avatar: The Battle for Pandora	Jersey Jack Pinball	
2025	Star Wars: Fall of the Empire	Stern Pinball, Inc.	
2025	Winchester Mystery House	Barrels of Fun	

== Chronology of Annual Pinball Expos ==
Year	Date	Location	Show Highlights	Ref.
1	1985 November 22–24	Holiday Inn O'Hare/Kennedy in Rosemont, IL	Premiere Technology/Gottlieb Plant Tour	
2	1986 November 21–23	Holiday Inn O'Hare/Kennedy in Rosemont, IL	Williams Plant Tour	
3	1987 October 9–11	Holiday Inn O'Hare/Kennedy in Rosemont, IL		
4	1988 October 7–9	Ramada Inn, Rosemont, IL (near O’Hare Airport)		
5	1989 September 29–30	Ramada Inn, Rosemont, IL (near O’Hare Airport)		
6	1990 November 9–10	Ramada Inn, Rosemont, IL (near O’Hare Airport)		
7	1991 October 25–27	Ramada Inn, Rosemont, IL (near O’Hare Airport)	Pinball Expo Hall of Fame Inaugurated	
8	1992 November 12–15	Ramada Inn, Rosemont, IL (near O’Hare Airport)		
9	1993 September 9–12	Ramada Inn, Rosemont, IL (near O’Hare Airport)		
10	1994 November 10–13	Ramada Inn, Rosemont, IL (near O’Hare Airport)		
11	1995 October 26–29	Ramada Inn, Rosemont, IL (near O’Hare Airport)		
12	1996 November 14–17	Ramada Inn, Rosemont, IL (near O’Hare Airport)		
13	1997 November 13–16	Ramada Inn, Rosemont, IL (near O’Hare Airport)		
14	1998 October 22–25	Ramada Inn, Rosemont, IL (near O’Hare Airport)		
15	1999 October 21–24	Ramada Inn, Rosemont, IL (near O’Hare Airport)		
16	2000 October 19–22	Ramada Inn, Rosemont, IL (near O’Hare Airport)		
17	2001 October 18–21	Ramada Inn, Rosemont, IL (near O’Hare Airport)		
18	2002 October 17–20	Ramada Inn, Rosemont, IL (near O’Hare Airport)		
19	2003 October 16–19	Ramada Inn, Rosemont, IL (near O’Hare Airport)		
20	2004 October 14–17	Ramada Inn, Rosemont, IL (near O’Hare Airport)		
21	2005 November 17–20	Wyndam Hotel, Rosemont, IL (near O’Hare Airport)		
22	2006 November 2–6	Wyndam Hotel, Rosemont, IL (near O’Hare Airport)		
23	2007 October 24–28	Wyndam Hotel, Rosemont, IL (near O’Hare Airport)		
24	2008 October 1–5	Westin Chicago North Shore Hotel, Wheeling, IL		
25	2009 October 14–18	Westin Chicago North Shore Hotel, Wheeling, IL		
26	2010 October 20–24	Westin Chicago North Shore Hotel, Wheeling, IL		
27	2011 October 19–23	Westin Chicago North Shore Hotel, Wheeling, IL		
28	2012 October 17–21	Westin Chicago North Shore Hotel, Wheeling, IL		
29	2013 October 16–20	Westin Chicago North Shore Hotel, Wheeling, IL		
30	2014 October 17–19	Westin Chicago North Shore Hotel, Wheeling, IL	Pinball Expo Service and Support Hall of Fame Inaugurated	
31	2015 October 14–18	Westin Chicago North Shore Hotel, Wheeling, IL		
32	2016 October 12–16	Westin Chicago North Shore Hotel, Wheeling, IL		
33	2017 October 11–15	Westin Chicago North Shore Hotel, Wheeling, IL		
34	2018 October 17–20	Westin Chicago North Shore Hotel, Wheeling, IL	Stern Pinball Inc. Factory Tour	
34	2018 October 17–20	Westin Chicago North Shore Hotel, Wheeling, IL	Big Ball Bowler Tournament	
35	2019 October 16–19	Westin Chicago North Shore Hotel, Wheeling, IL	Stern Pinball Inc. Factory Tour	
36	2020 October 14–17	Virtual due to COVID-19 restrictions		
37	2021 October 27–30	Renaissance Schaumburg Convention Center Hotel, Schaumburg, IL	Stern Pinball Inc. Factory Tour	
38	2022 October 19–22	Renaissance Schaumburg Convention Center Hotel, Schaumburg, IL	Jersey Jack Pinball Factory Tour	
39	2023 October 18–21	Renaissance Schaumburg Convention Center Hotel, Schaumburg, IL	Stern Pinball Inc. Factory Tour	
40	2024 October 15–19	Renaissance Schaumburg Convention Center Hotel, Schaumburg, IL	Chicago Gaming Company Factory & Galloping Ghost Arcade Tour, Logan Arcade & American Pinball Factory Tour, Jersey Jack Pinball Inc. Factory Tour, and Stern Pinball Inc. Factory Tour to commemorate the 40th Anniversary of Pinball Expo	
41	2025 October 15–18	Renaissance Schaumburg Convention Center Hotel, Schaumburg, IL	Stern Pinball Inc. Factory Tour	

== Pinball Expo Hall of Fame ==
As early as Pinball Expo '88, Rob Berk was championing the idea of a Pinball Expo Hall of Fame. In 1991 the Hall of Fame was created with the induction of Harry E. Williams, Sam Stern, Ray Moloney and David Gottlieb.

Date	Inductee	Ref.
October 17, 2025	Doug Watson, Tim Seckel, Mark Guidarelli, Keith Elwin, Rick Naegele, Jeremy Packer, Harrison Drake	
October 18, 2024	John Buscaglia, Jerry Thompson, Jody Dankberg, Fred Young, Art Stenholm, Steve Epstein	
October 20, 2023	Chris Granner, Mark Galvez, Mark Weyna	
October 21, 2022	Ray Tanzer, Zofia Bil Ryan	
October 29, 2021	Gil Pollock, Keith Johnson	
October 17, 2020	Tommy Grant, Eulogio Pingarrón, Jack Guarnieri	
October 17, 2019	Mike O'Donnell, Cassandra Peterson, Pat Powers	
October 19, 2018	Elliot Eismin, Jon Norris, Ken Fedesna	
October 21, 2017	Gordon Horlick, Dwight Sullivan, Pat McMahon, Brian L. Schmidt, Neal Falconer	
October 15, 2016	Don Marshall, Connie Mitchell	
October 17, 2015	John Rotharmel, David Thiel, Lyman F. Sheats Jr.	
October 18, 2014	Nolan Bushnell, Brian Eddy	
October 19, 2013	Lonnie Ropp, Suzanne Ciani, Eugene Jarvis	
October 20, 2012	Steve Kirk, John Borg	
October 22, 2011	Mark Ritchie, John Popadiuk	
October 23, 2010	Python Anghelo, Gary Flower, Michael Shalhoub, Clay Harrell	
October 17, 2009	Dennis Nordman, Barry Oursler, Michael Stroll, Jim Schelberg	
October 4, 2008	Ted Zale, George Gomez	
October 27, 2007	Lou, Dave, and Meyer Gensberg (Genco), Alvin Gottlieb, John Youssi	
October 2, 2006	Paul Faris, Judd Weinberg	
November 19, 2005	Margaret Hudson, Roy Parker	
October 16, 2004	Robert Berk, Ed Cebula, Greg Freres, Gary Gayton, Kevin O'Connor, Michael Pacak, Joe Kaminkow	
October 18, 2003	Tom Nieman Ed Krynski	
October 19, 2002	Christian Marche Jim Patla	
October 11, 2001	Gary Stern Steve Young	
October 21, 2000	Pat Lawlor Roger Sharpe	
October 23, 1999	Larry DeMar Greg Kmiec	
October 24, 1998	Gordon Morison	
November 15, 1997	Dick Bueschel Steve Ritchie	
November 16, 1996	Dave Christensen	
October 28, 1995	Norm Clark Wendell McAdams	
November 12, 1994	Wayne Neyens	
September 11, 1993	Steve Kordek George Molentin	
October 24, 1992	Harvey Heiss Harry Mabs	
October 26, 1991	David Gottlieb Harry E. Williams Ray Moloney Sam Stern	

== Pinball Expo Service and Support Hall of Fame ==
Pinball Expo's Service and Support Hall of Fame was established at the 2014 Expo to recognize individuals and organizations who have made significant contributions to the pinball hobby.

Date	Inductee	Ref.
October 18, 2024	Key Snodgrass, Imoto Harney	
October 20, 2023	Mark Patzke, LJ Greene	
October 21, 2022	John Jaidinger – Jaidinger Manufacturing, Richard Cesario – C&C Enterprises	
October 29, 2021	Eddie Adlum, Planetary Pinball	
October 17, 2020	Todd Tuckey - T.N.T. Amusements, Chas Siddiqi	
October 17, 2019	Pinball Life	
October 19, 2018	Martin Ayub - Pinball News	
October 21, 2017	Walter Day, Lloyd Olson	
October 15, 2016	Jay Stafford, Dave Marston	
October 17, 2015	Marco Specialties	
October 18, 2014	Shelly Sax, Churchill Cabinets, Foremost Plastics	
