= Riverside Brookfield High School =

High school in Riverside, Illinois, United States

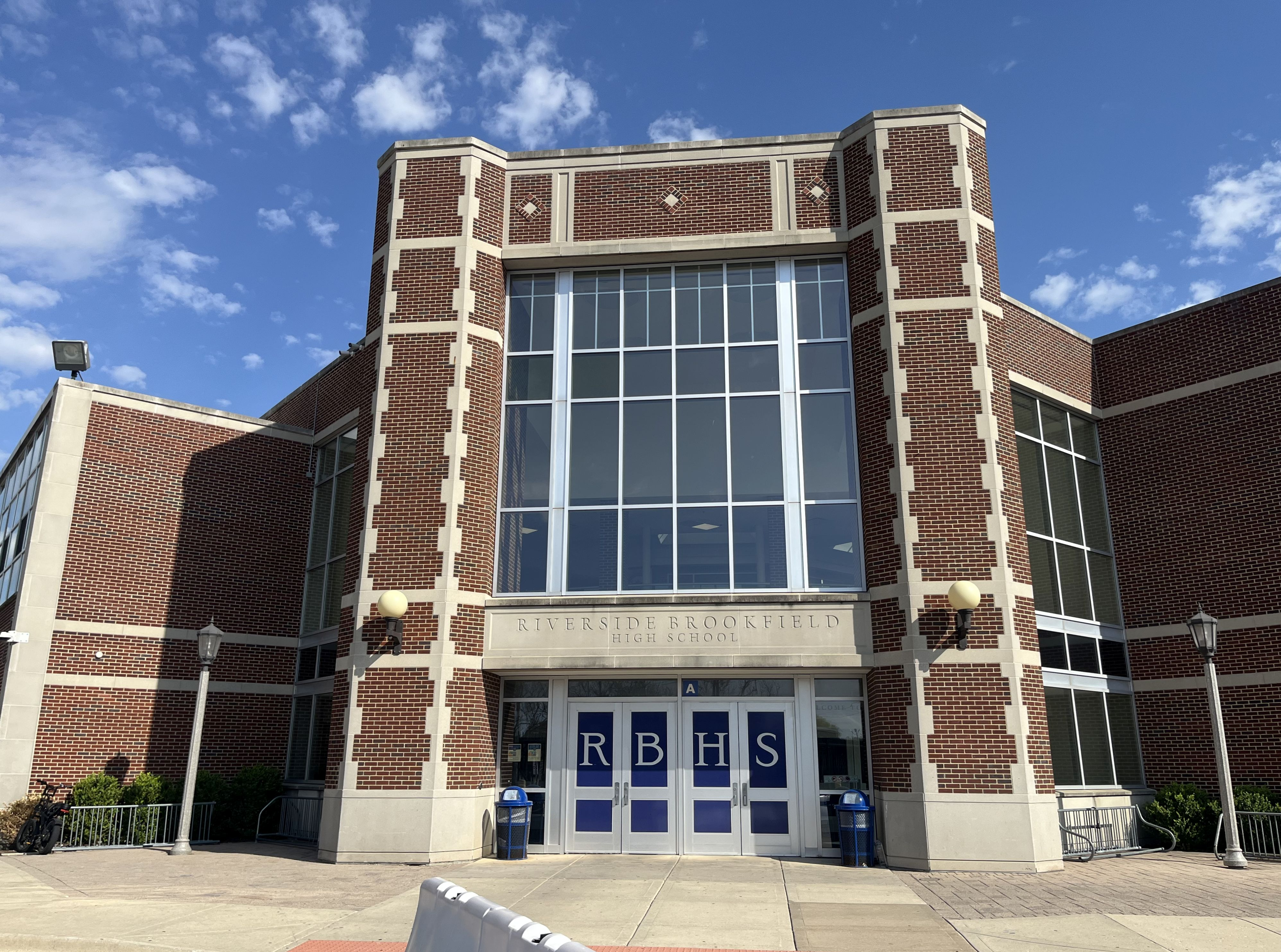
- "Excellence and Ethics in Education"

Location
- 160 Ridgewood Rd; Riverside, Illinois 60546; United States; 41.82865°N 87.83057°W

Information
- School type: Co-ed
- Established: 1909
- School district: 208
- Principal: Héctor Freytas
- Teaching staff: 102.30 (FTE)
- Grades: 9–12
- Enrollment: 1,663 (2024–2025)
- Student to teacher ratio: 16.26
- Colors: Royal Blue; White
- Mascot: Bulldog
- Newspaper: Clarion
- Yearbook: Rouser
- Website: www.rbhs208.net

Riverside Brookfield High School (RBHS) is a secondary school located directly between Riverside, Illinois, and Brookfield, Illinois, which educates grades 9–12. It serves the towns of Riverside, North Riverside, most of Brookfield, a small part of Broadview, and parts of La Grange Park. Its campus is adjacent to Brookfield Zoo. The mascot of Riverside Brookfield (RB) is Rouser the Bulldog. Riverside Brookfield Township High School District 208 passed a $58 million referendum, resulting in renovations to the school building, including a new swimming pool, athletics stadium, and classrooms. This was completed in Spring 2010. In 2015, the Board of Education used $14 million to address health/safety concerns and to build a new athletic complex.

== History ==
Riverside Brookfield High School can trace its roots back to the late 1880s with Brookfield School District 95, and Riverside School District 96. In 1909, voters in both districts approved the creation of a new school district for high school students. Thus, District 208, composed of Riverside Brookfield High School, was born. In 1917, a new high school building was completed to help centralize students and ease overcrowding. Despite the numerous extensions and renovations throughout the years, this building is still in use to this day. The 1917–18 school year also saw the introduction of the RBHS yearbook Rouser. In 1926, an expansion of the high school was completed giving the school more classrooms, an auditorium, a cafeteria, and a gymnasium. 1930 saw the introduction the school's newspaper Clarion. The same year saw the adoption of the bulldog as the school's mascot. In 1938, another expansion took place to offset the growing student body. More additions to offset growth were added in 1952 and 1961. A massive expansion and modernization effort took place in 1969 and continued through the 1970s. In 2009, a massive renovation effort was completed to help alleviate the building's age with repair and modernization. This project also saw the expansion of several departments.

== Academics ==
RBHS is home to multiple academic departments and hosts classes in applied and fine arts, English, math, science, social science, health and wellness, international languages, and special education services. RBHS also offers various AP and honors level courses.

== Athletics ==
RBHS's mascot is the bulldog. They are a member of the Illinois High School Association and currently compete in the Upstate Eight Conference.

Sport	Boys	Girls
Badminton	✗	✓
Baseball	✓	✗
Basketball	✓	✓
Bowling	✓	✓
Cheerleading	✓	✓
Cross Country	✓	✓
Football	✓	✗
Golf	✓	✓
Gymnastics	✗	✓
Lacrosse	✓	✓
Pom-poms	✗	✓
Soccer	✓	✓
Softball	✗	✓
Swimming & Diving	✓	✓
Tennis	✓	✓
Track & Field	✓	✓
Volleyball	✓	✓
Water Polo	✓	✓
Wrestling	✓	✓

== Student life ==
=== Media ===
The Clarion is the official newspaper of RBHS. It serves as the loose successor to the short-lived Sentinel which operated from 1924 to 1926. The Clarion began publication sometime around the school's inception and became official in 1930. The Clarion is student-run and seeks to teach members about the performance and ethics of journalism.

RBTV, the school's television program, can trace its roots back to 1980 with students managed a makeshift television studio with second-hand equipment to produce projects and a student-run news program. RBTV became official in 1984. In 1985, The Metrovision Cable Company donated cable broadcasting equipment to RBTV. This allowed RBTV to be broadcast on cable television throughout the Riverside-Brookfield area. It was considered pioneering at the time as one of the first high school tv stations.

== Notable alumni ==
- Tom Baugh (1981) was an NFL center (1986–1989), playing most of his career with the Kansas City Chiefs.
- Lee Phillip Bell was an American soap opera writer, American television talk show host, and Soap opera producer co-creating The Bold and the Beautiful, and The Young and the Restless with her husband
- Michael Colgrass (1949) is a composer who won the 1978 Pulitzer Prize for Music and an Emmy Award in 1982 for a PBS documentary Soundings: The Music of Michael Colgrass.
- Bob Daily (1978) is an author, producer, and television writer. He received two awards from the Writers Guild of America for his work on the television series Frasier, and later he became a producer for the series Desperate Housewives.
- Jack Dykinga (1961) is an author and photojournalist who won the 1971 Pulitzer Prize for feature photography.
- Tom Kondla was a professional basketball center playing the 1968–69 season, mostly with the ABA Houston Mavericks.
- Owen Murphy (2022) is a baseball pitcher in the Atlanta Braves organization.
- Dana Rettke (2017) is a former Wisconsin Badgers Volleyball player and National Champion and currently plays professionally in Turkey for Eczacıbaşı.
