= D96 =

D96 may refer to:

- HMS Gloucester (D96)
- HMS Crossbow (D96)
- Riverside School District 96
