= Brookfield station (Illinois) =

Commuter rail station in Brookfield, Illinois

Brookfield

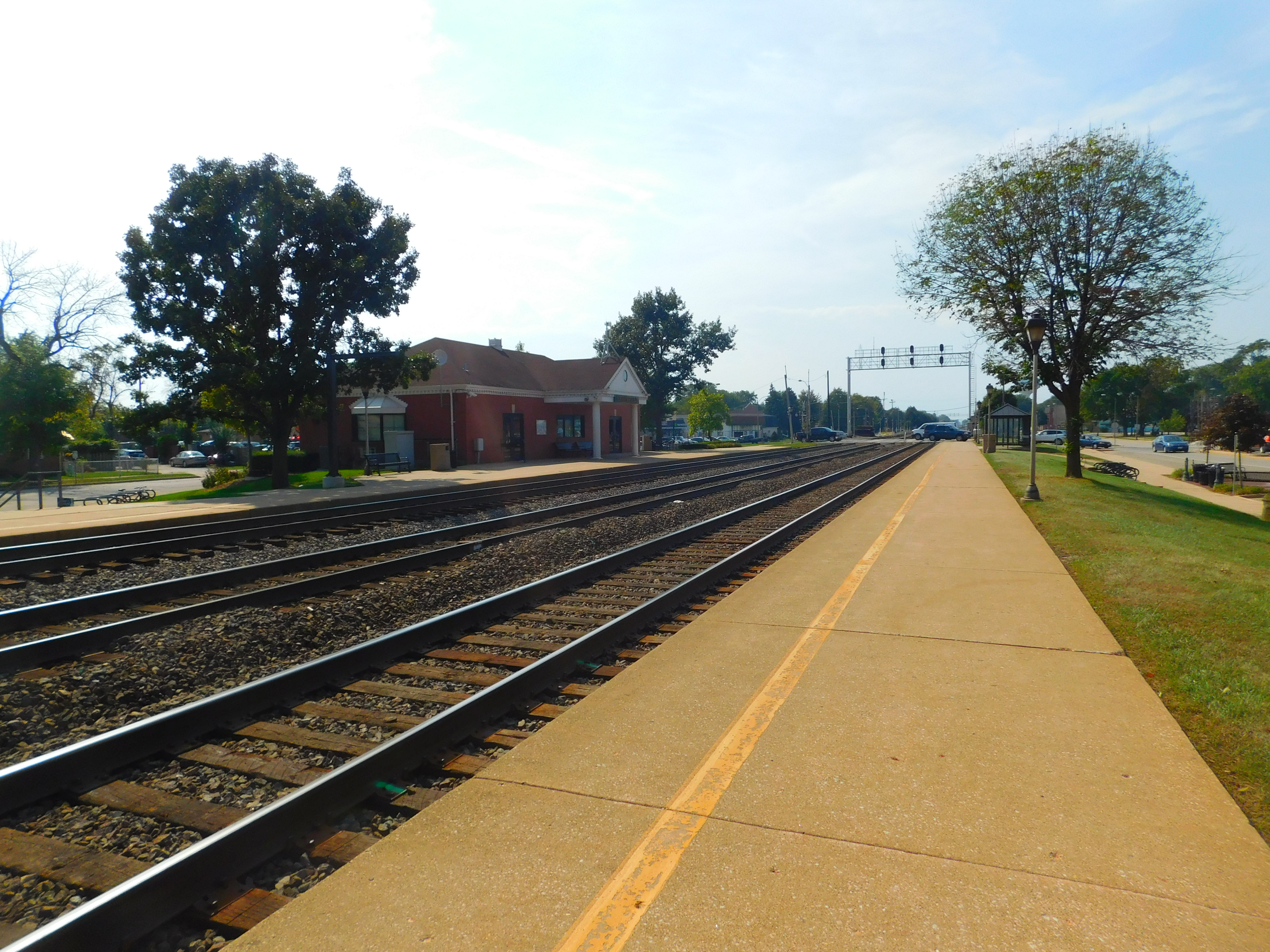
- The platforms of Brookfield station in September 2016

General information
- Location: 8858 Burlington Avenue; Brookfield, Illinois
- Coordinates: 41.8220°N 87.8432°W
- Owner: Village of Brookfield
- Line: BNSF Chicago Subdivision
- Platforms: 2 side platforms
- Tracks: 3
- Connections: Pace Bus

Construction
- Parking: Yes
- Cycle facilities: Bicycle racks at Burlington and Forest Avenues
- Accessible: Yes, partial (Note: At partially accessible stations, customers using mobility devices can access and use trains; however, the stations may not have other accessibility features such as accessible bathrooms, Braille signage, visual display announcements, etc.)

Other information
- Fare zone: 2

History
- Opened: June 15, 1889
- Rebuilt: 1981
- Former names: Grossdale (1889–1905)

Passengers
- 2018: 546 (average weekday) ▼4.5%
- Rank: 93 out of 236

Services
Preceding station	Metra	Following station
Congress Park Weekday Limited toward Aurora	BNSF	Hollywood toward Union Station
Former services
Preceding station	Burlington Route	Following station
Congress Park toward Aurora	Suburban Service	Hollywood toward Chicago
Track layout
Location

Brookfield is one of three stations on Metra's BNSF Line in Brookfield, Illinois. The station is 12.3 miles (19.8 km) from Union Station, the east end of the line. In Metra's zone-based fare system, Brookfield is in zone 2. As of 2018, Brookfield is the 93rd busiest of Metra's 236 non-downtown stations, with an average of 546 weekday boardings. A staffed station is on the south side of the three tracks.

As of September 8, 2025, Brookfield is served by 52 trains (25 inbound, 27 outbound) on weekdays, and by 36 trains (18 in each direction) on weekends and holidays. On weekdays, two trains originate, and five trains terminate, at Brookfield.

== History ==
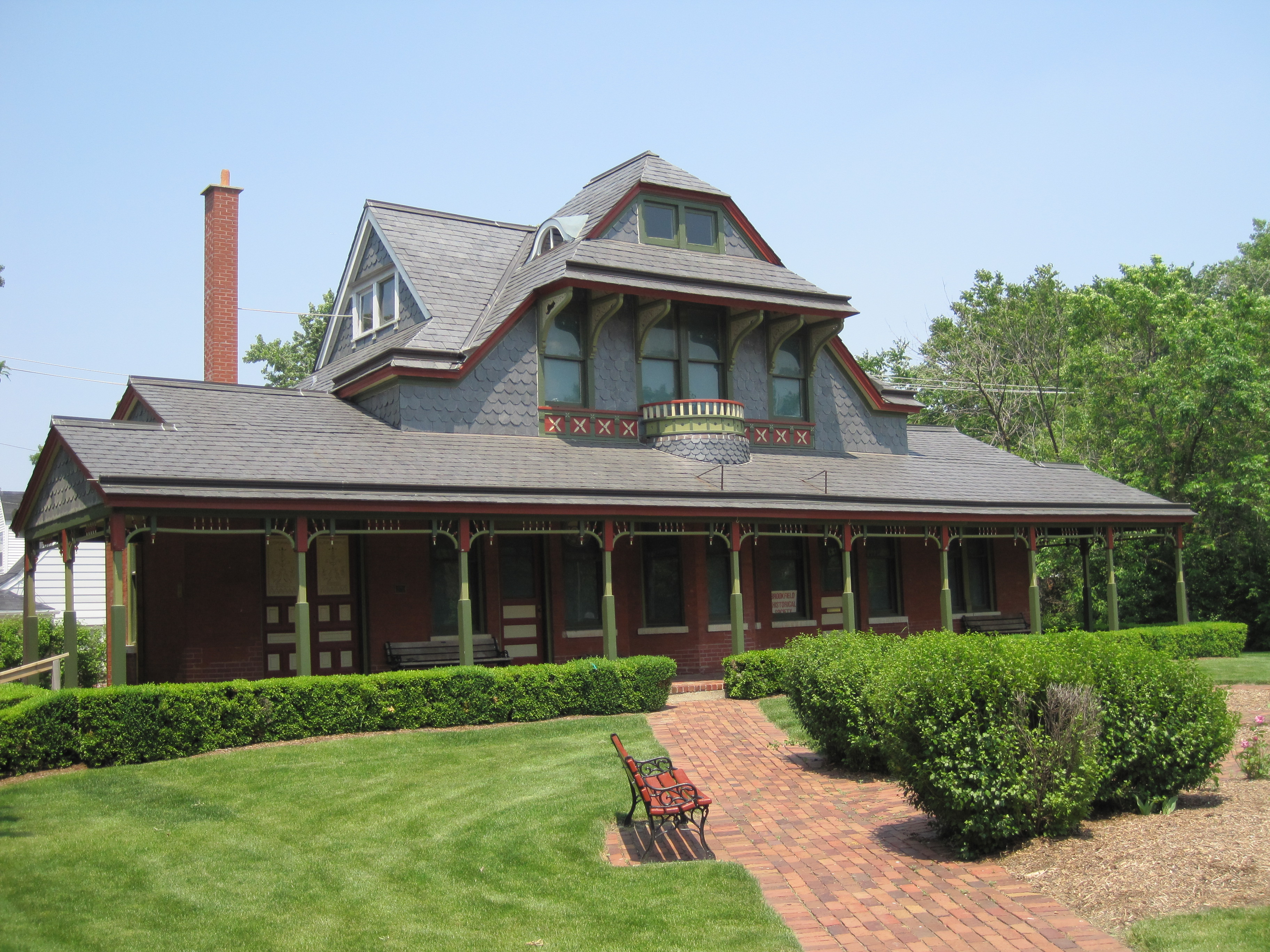
The old Brookfield station, now a museum.

Brookfield station was originally built in 1889 as Grossdale station, when Samuel Eberly Gross, a Chicago lawyer, began selling building lots platted from farms and woodlands he had acquired along both sides of the Chicago, Burlington & Quincy Railroad line. Brookfield itself was originally known as "Grossdale," the name a request by Gross in return for the land used by the railroad. The station was the first building Gross erected in the new subdivision. In 1981 the original station house was moved across the tracks onto the corner of Brookfield Avenue and Forest Avenue, and now houses the Brookfield Historical Society. The current Brookfield station serves as a standard commuter railroad station, while the old Grossdale station has been on the National Register of Historic Places since 1982.

== Bus connections ==
Pace

- "Route 331 – Cumberland/5th Avenue". PaceBus.com. Chicago: Pace Suburban Bus Service.
