= William L. Blaser =

American businessman and politician (1923–2018)

Member of the Illinois House of Representatives

Personal details
- Party: Republican

William L. Blaser (December 10, 1923 – February 26, 2018) was an American businessman and politician.

== Biography ==
Blaser was born in Brookfield, Illinois. He served in the United States Navy during World War II. Blaser graduated from Northwestern University and went to Harvard Law School. Blaser was involved in the food manufacturing business. He was also involved with the carpet and tile businesses. He lived in Park Forest, Illinois with his wife and family. Blaser served on the Park Forest Library Board and was president of the library board. Blaser served in the Illinois House of Representatives from 1965 to 1967 and was involved with the Republican Party. Blase was elected as an at-large representative due to problems with reapportionment of the Illinois General Assembly. He then served as director of the Illinois Environmental Protection Agency. He died in Walnut Creek, California.
