= Brookfield, Illinois =

- Village
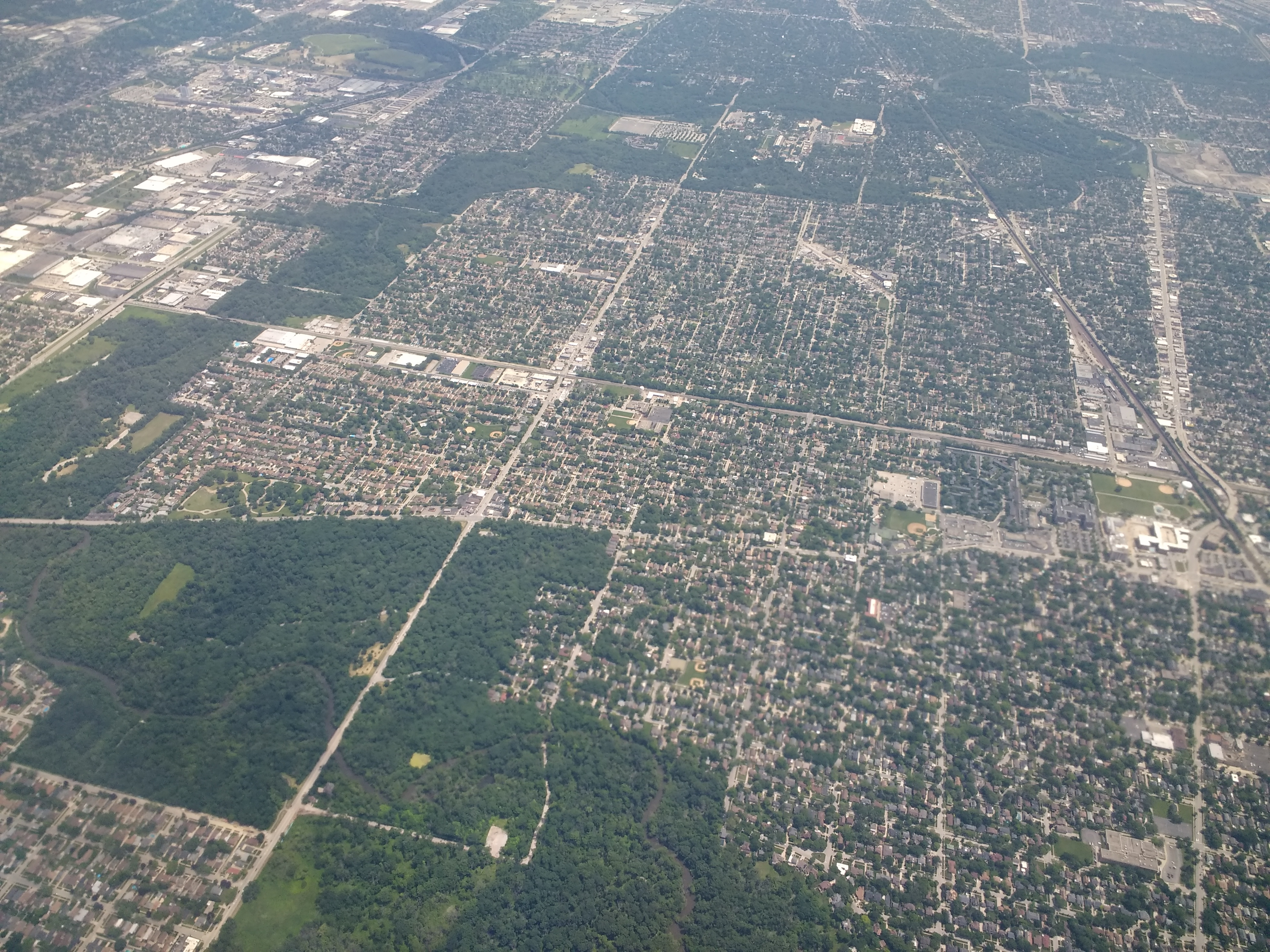
- Part of Brookfield and neighboring La Grange Park

- Flag Seal

- Location of Brookfield in Cook County, Illinois

- Location within Greater Chicago Location within Illinois Location within the United States
- Coordinates: 41°49′22″N 87°50′51″W
- Country: United States
- State: Illinois
- County: Cook
- Township: Lyons, Proviso, Riverside
- Incorporated: 1893

Government
  - Type: Village-manager
  - President: Michael J. Garvey

Area
  - Total: 3.07 sq mi (7.95 km^{2})
  - Land: 3.06 sq mi (7.93 km^{2})
  - Water: 0.0077 sq mi (0.02 km^{2}) 0.33%

Population (2020)
  - Total: 19,476
  - Density: 6,357.1/sq mi (2,454.48/km^{2})
- Down 0.56% from 2000

Standard of living (2007-11)
  - Per capita income: $31,651
  - Median home value: $263,600
- ZIP Code: 60513
- Area code: 708
- Geocode: 17-08576
- FIPS code: 17-08576
- Website: www.brookfieldil.gov

Brookfield (formerly Grossdale) is a village in Cook County, Illinois, United States, located 13 miles (21 km) west of downtown Chicago. Per the 2020 census, the population was 19,476. The city is home to the Brookfield Zoo.

== History ==
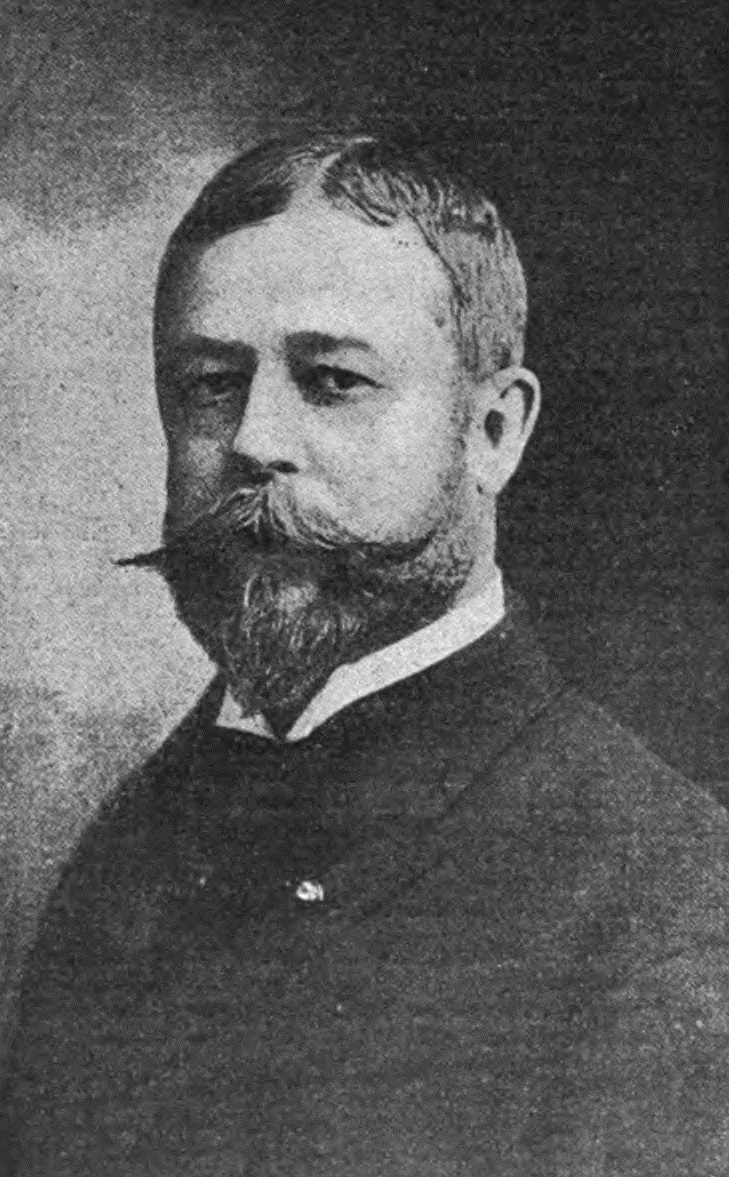
Samuel Eberly Gross

Settlement of the village dates to 1889 when Samuel Eberly Gross, a Chicago lawyer turned real estate investor, began selling building lots plotted from farms and woodlands he had acquired along both sides of the Chicago, Burlington & Quincy Railroad line, which provided passenger and freight service between Chicago and Aurora, Illinois. "Grossdale", as his development was originally called, offered suburban living at prices affordable to working-class families.

The first two buildings Gross erected were a train station south of the tracks at what is now Prairie Avenue, and a pavilion across the tracks. The original train station was moved across the tracks and a few hundred feet east in 1981, and is now the home of the village's historical society and museum, as well as listed on the National Register of Historic Places. The pavilion housed the first post office, general store, Gross' real estate office, meeting rooms, and eventually a dance hall. Gross offered free train outings from Chicago to Grossdale where the prospects were met at the station by a band and treated to a picnic lunch, with a sales pitch from Gross. In addition to parcels of land, he had a number of house designs to offer at "cheap" prices.

Gross later added the subdivisions of Hollywood (1893) and West Grossdale (1895), each with its own train station. Residents voted to incorporate as the village of Grossdale in 1893. The name was changed in 1905 after residents became displeased with Gross, whose personal life and fortune had floundered. A contest to choose a new name yielded "Brookfield" in respect for Salt Creek, which runs through the area. Gross also has a school named after him called S.E. Gross.

In 1920, the old Plank Toll Road, now called Ogden Avenue (US Hwy 34), was paved, providing easy automobile access to and from Chicago.

The Chicago Zoological Park, commonly called the Brookfield Zoo, opened in 1934. The zoo is located on land given to the Forest Preserve District by Edith Rockefeller McCormick in 1919.

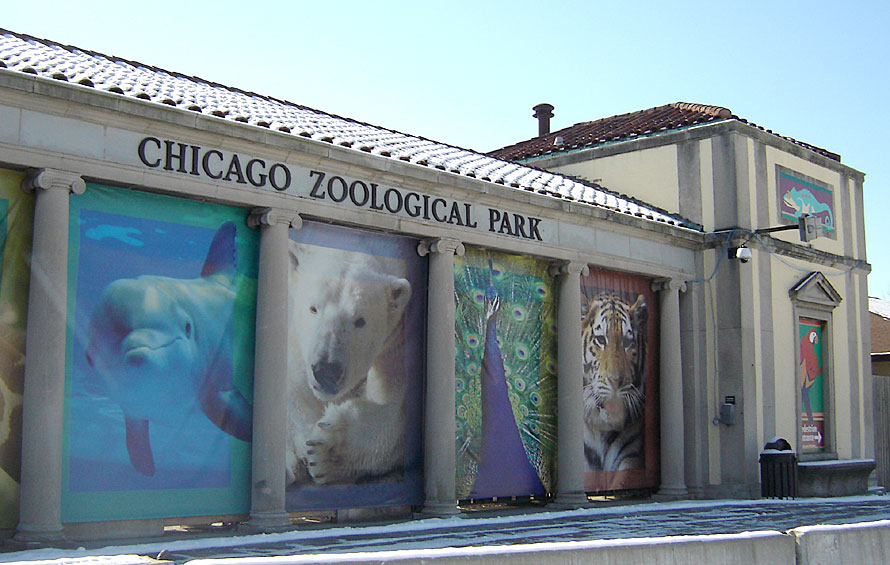
Brookfield Zoo

== Geography ==
Brookfield is located at 41°49′22″N 87°50′51″W (41.822681, -87.847532).

According to the 2010 census, Brookfield has a total area of 3.067 square miles (7.94 km^{2}), of which 3.06 square miles (7.93 km^{2}) (or 99.77%) is land and 0.007 square miles (0.02 km^{2}) (or 0.23%) is water.

Most of Brookfield is flat land with various small hills and rises. Along Salt Creek is a steep ravine that is home to many oak savannas. These oak savannas are the primary ecosystem of Brookfield, and sprawl out from large, forested areas into small pockets in the village.

== Demographics ==
Historical population
| Census | Pop. | Note | %± |
|---|---|---|---|
| 1900 | 1,111 | | — |
| 1910 | 2,186 | | 96.8% |
| 1920 | 3,589 | | 64.2% |
| 1930 | 10,035 | | 179.6% |
| 1940 | 10,817 | | 7.8% |
| 1950 | 15,472 | | 43.0% |
| 1960 | 20,429 | | 32.0% |
| 1970 | 20,284 | | −0.7% |
| 1980 | 19,395 | | −4.4% |
| 1990 | 18,876 | | −2.7% |
| 2000 | 19,085 | | 1.1% |
| 2010 | 18,978 | | −0.6% |
| 2020 | 19,476 | | 2.6% |
U.S. Decennial Census; 2010 2020

=== Racial and ethnic composition ===
Brookfield village, Illinois – Racial and ethnic composition Note: the US Census treats Hispanic/Latino as an ethnic category. This table excludes Latinos from the racial categories and assigns them to a separate category. Hispanics/Latinos may be of any race.
| Race / Ethnicity (NH = Non-Hispanic) | Pop 2000 | Pop 2010 | Pop 2020 | % 2000 | % 2010 | % 2020 |
|---|---|---|---|---|---|---|
| White alone (NH) | 16,961 | 14,888 | 12,791 | 88.87% | 78.45% | 65.68% |
| Black or African American alone (NH) | 165 | 456 | 597 | 0.86% | 2.40% | 3.07% |
| Native American or Alaska Native alone (NH) | 16 | 11 | 27 | 0.08% | 0.06% | 0.14% |
| Asian alone (NH) | 235 | 285 | 346 | 1.23% | 1.50% | 1.78% |
| Pacific Islander alone (NH) | 2 | 0 | 3 | 0.01% | 0.00% | 0.02% |
| Other race alone (NH) | 4 | 11 | 52 | 0.02% | 0.06% | 0.27% |
| Mixed race or Multiracial (NH) | 165 | 258 | 640 | 0.86% | 1.36% | 3.29% |
| Hispanic or Latino (any race) | 1,537 | 3,069 | 5,020 | 8.05% | 16.17% | 25.78% |
| Total | 19,085 | 18,978 | 19,476 | 100.00% | 100.00% | 100.00% |

=== 2020 census ===
As of the 2020 census, Brookfield had a population of 19,476. The population density was 6,341.91 inhabitants per square mile (2,448.63/km^{2}). There were 7,393 households and 4,692 families. The median age was 39.8 years. 23.6% of residents were under the age of 18 and 14.6% were 65 years of age or older. For every 100 females there were 94.6 males, and for every 100 females age 18 and over there were 92.6 males age 18 and over.

100.0% of residents lived in urban areas, while 0.0% lived in rural areas.

Of all households, 36.0% had children under the age of 18 living in them. 51.5% were married-couple households, 17.0% were households with a male householder and no spouse or partner present, and 25.2% were households with a female householder and no spouse or partner present. About 24.4% of all households were made up of individuals, and 10.5% had someone living alone who was 65 years of age or older.

There were 7,785 housing units at an average density of 2,535.00 per square mile (978.77/km^{2}), and 5.0% were vacant. The homeowner vacancy rate was 1.3% and the rental vacancy rate was 5.2%.

=== Income and poverty ===
The median income for a household in the village was $84,891, and the median income for a family was $103,072. Males had a median income of $57,343 versus $47,355 for females. The per capita income for the village was $38,222. About 4.3% of families and 7.2% of the population were below the poverty line, including 9.8% of those under age 18 and 9.5% of those age 65 or over.

== Government ==
Nearly all of Brookfield is in Illinois's 3rd congressional district; the northernmost portion, a largely wooded area north of the zoo, is in the 4th district.

== Newspapers and publications ==
Throughout the 1930s, 1940s and 1950s, newspapers published in Brookfield included The Suburban Magnet and Brookfield Star. The largest and most successful newspaper printed in Brookfield was the Brookfield Enterprise. It was started in 1932 by Porter Reubendall, then owned and expanded in the 1950s by Elmer C. Johnson, and ceased publication in 1985.

== Public education ==
Elementary school districts serving sections of Brookfield include: Brookfield School District 95, LaGrange School District 102, Lyons School District 103, and Riverside School District 96.

Brookfield-LaGrange Elementary School District 95 is the primary elementary school district for Brookfield residents, and is made up of one elementary school (Brook-Park Elementary School) and one junior high school (S.E. Gross Middle School). Other Brookfield students may attend schools in Riverside School District 96, LaGrange Elementary School District 102, or Lyons School District 103. District 95 and 96 teens then attend Riverside Brookfield High School in District 208, while students from SD 102 and SD 103 (the southeast portion of Brookfield) attend Lyons Township High School, District 204, which has campuses in La Grange and Western Springs.

== Transportation ==
Brookfield's connection to the Chicago, Burlington & Quincy lives on with Metra's BNSF Line, which serves three stations in the Brookfield area: Congress Park, Brookfield, and Hollywood. Metra trains operate daily between Chicago and Aurora. Various Pace bus stops exist throughout the village, as well as common trolleys. The Salt Creek Trail is accessible in town.

== Attractions ==
- The Brookfield Zoo, managed by the Chicago Zoological Society, is open every day of the year.
- The Galloping Ghost Arcade is the largest video arcade in the United States, with over 1,050+ video games (retro and modern), pinball machines, and ticket redemption games. Additionally, the city is also home to nearby Galloping Ghost Pinball, a nearby arcade that has exclusively pinball machines not seen at Galloping Ghost Arcade, as well as Galloping Ghost Productions, a company that makes its own arcade games.
- North Kiwanis Park is a major area for many annual events such as German Fest, Fall Fest, Battle of the Bands, and the Brookfield Fourth of July Parade.
- The Brookfield oak savannas are a popular nature preserve, with many animal and plant species.
- The Grossdale Train Station now houses the Brookfield Historical Society. It is the oldest structure in Brookfield, having been built in the 1880s before the city was founded.
- Salt Creek flows through many suburbs and is a tributary to the Des Plaines River. The creek is wide and long, with gentle, murky water, good fishing, and vast amounts of wildlife.
- Jaycee Ehlert Park is the largest park in Brookfield. A North American F-86L Sabre is on display as a Korean War memorial. It was home to Brookfield's renowned carnival, "Brookfest", before it was cancelled in the mid-2000s due to various gang fights and firework malfunctions.

== Notable people ==
- William L. Blaser, Illinois state representative and businessman
- Milt Bocek, former outfielder of the Chicago White Sox
- Michael Colgrass, Pulitzer Prize-winning composer
- Jim Holvay, guitarist/songwriter for the band The Mob, known for four hit songs written for The Buckinghams ("Kind of a Drag," "Hey Baby (They're Playing Our Song)," "Don't You Care," and "Susan")
- Chris Klein (actor)
- Tom Kondla, basketball player with the Minnesota Pipers and Houston Mavericks of the American Basketball Association
- Joy Layne, 1950s pop singer
- George Marsh, Medal of Honor recipient during the American Civil War, born and enlisted in Brookfield
- Lou Saban, football player and coach for several college and professional teams
- Allen C. Skorepa, lichenologist
