= Arthur T. Broche =

American politician

Arthur T. Broche (April 15, 1892 – October 29, 1968) was an American politician.

broche was born in Saint Paul, Minnesota. He went to the Chicago, Illinois public schools. He served in the United States Army and was involved with the Pancho Villa Expedition and World War I. Broche served in the Illinois House of Representatives from 1933 to 1943 and was a Republican Party. Broche lived in Riverside, Illinois. He died at the MacNeal Hospital in Chicago, Illinois.
