= Tom Kondla =

American basketball player

Personal information
- Born: November 30, 1946 (age 79) Brookfield, Illinois, U.S.
- Listed height: 6 ft 8 in (2.03 m)
- Listed weight: 225 lb (102 kg)

Career information
- High school: Riverside Brookfield (Riverside, Illinois)
- College: Minnesota (1966–1968)
- NBA draft: 1968: 7th round, 91st overall pick
- Drafted by: Milwaukee Bucks
- Playing career: 1968–1969
- Position: Center
- Number: 23, 41, 52

Career history
- 1968: Minnesota Pipers
- 1968–1969: Houston Mavericks

Career highlights
- First-team All-Big Ten (1967); Second-team All-Big Ten (1968)
- Stats at Basketball Reference

Thomas A. Kondla (born November 30, 1946) is an American former professional basketball player.

== Career ==
Kondla was born on November 30, 1946, in Brookfield, Illinois. He attended Riverside Brookfield High School in Riverside, Illinois.

Kondla played at the collegiate level at the University of Minnesota. He was drafted by the Milwaukee Bucks in the seventh round of the 1968 NBA draft, and later played for the Minnesota Pipers and the Houston Mavericks of the American Basketball Association (ABA).
