= Congress Park station =

Commuter rail station in Brookfield, Illinois

Congress Park

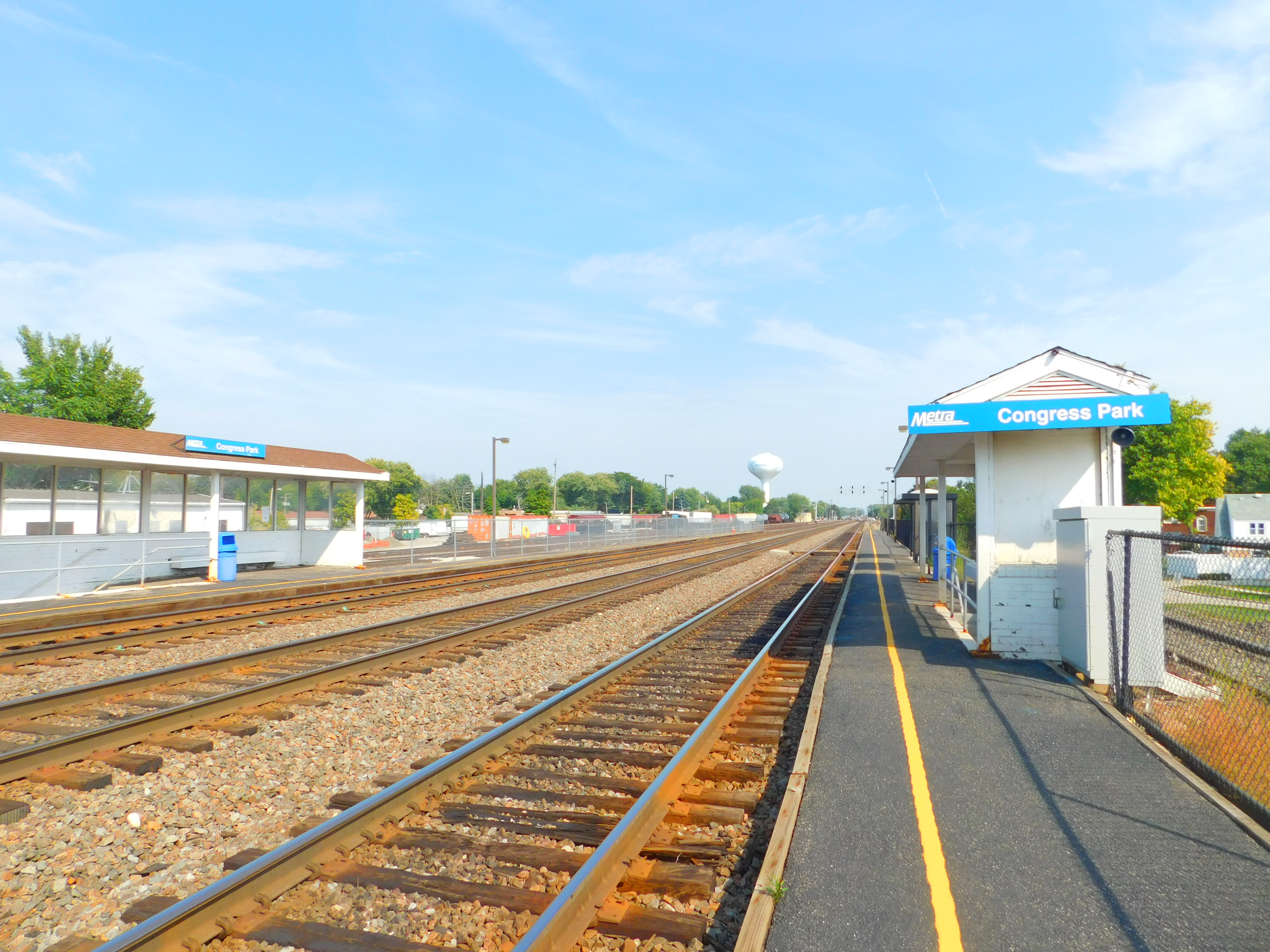
- Congress Park station from the inbound platform in September 2016

General information
- Location: 1/2 mile west of Maple Street on Burlington Avenue; Brookfield, Illinois
- Coordinates: 41.8188°N 87.8576°W
- Owner: Metra
- Line: BNSF Chicago Subdivision
- Platforms: 2 side platforms
- Tracks: 3
- Connections: Pace Buses

Construction
- Structure type: Shelters
- Parking: Yes
- Accessible: No

Other information
- Fare zone: 3

Passengers
- 2018: 368 (average weekday) ▲26.9%
- Rank: 128 out of 236

Services
Preceding station	Metra	Following station
LaGrange Road toward Aurora	BNSF	Brookfield toward Union Station
Former services
Preceding station	Burlington Route	Following station
La Grange toward Aurora	Suburban Service	Brookfield toward Chicago
Track layout
Location

Congress Park is one of three stations on Metra's BNSF Line in Brookfield, Illinois. The station is 13 miles (20.9 km) from Union Station, the east end of the line. In Metra's zone-based fare system, Congress Park is in zone 3. As of 2018, Congress Park is the 128th busiest of Metra's 236 non-downtown stations, with an average of 368 weekday boardings. Shelters are on both sides of the tracks. Metra trains serve Congress Park in the peak direction on weekdays only.

As of September 8, 2025, Congress Park is served by 26 trains (13 in each direction) on weekdays.

== Bus connections ==
Pace

- "Route 302 – Ogden/Stanley". PaceBus.com. Chicago: Pace Suburban Bus Service.
- "Route 331 – Cumberland - 5th Avenue". PaceBus.com. Chicago: Pace Suburban Bus Service.
