= Galloping Ghost Arcade =

Video arcade in Brookfield, Illinois, US

- Type: Video arcade
- Industry: Video games
- Founded: 1994; 32 years ago (Galloping Ghost Productions) August 13, 2010; 16 years ago (Galloping Ghost Arcade) March 19, 2019; 7 years ago (Galloping Ghost Pinball)
- Founder: Doc Mack
- Headquarters: 9415 Ogden Ave, Brookfield, Illinois, United States
- Owner: Doc Mack
- Website: gallopingghostarcade.com gallopingghostpinball.com gallopingghostproductions.com gallopingghostreproductions.com

Galloping Ghost Arcade is a video arcade located in Brookfield, Illinois (a suburb of Chicago). It opened on August 13, 2010. It contains 1,094 arcade games (which grows each Monday) and pinball machines from the 1970s, 1980s, 1990s, and 2000s, as well as modern arcade games and pinball machines, making it the largest video arcade in the United States and one of the largest in the world. (Note: Funspot in New Hampshire arcade is larger in terms of square footage however Galloping Ghost is larger in terms of total number of games.) Other establishments include Galloping Ghost Pinball, which contains over 50 pinball machines that are not seen at Galloping Ghost Arcade, and Galloping Ghost Productions, which makes its own arcade games. All three establishments are owned by co-founder Doc Mack.

== History ==
The idea of starting an arcade came to co-founder Doc Mack in the early 1990s while he was a clerk at a Babbage's. After a chance encounter with Mortal Kombat co-creator Ed Boon, Mack used that meeting to pursue a career in the games industry. Mack opened Galloping Ghost Arcade on August 13, 2010 with 130 games.

In 2020, Galloping Ghost secured a rare Sega R360 arcade cabinet, one of only approximately 100 such cabinets that were ever made. Their R360 machine has G-Loc but notably lacks Wing Wars.

Galloping Ghost Arcade continually adds to its selection of games. Each Monday afternoon they hold a Monday Mystery Game reveal which adds a new game to the arcade. Galloping Ghost Arcade has also built custom cabinets for games that never received an arcade release, an example being Primal Rage II. Additionally, if a player requests a game to be added to the arcade, It will be added to the arcade on the Monday Mystery Game reveal.

Besides Galloping Ghost Arcade, owner Dock Mack also owns and operates Galloping Ghost Pinball, a nearby arcade that opened on March 19, 2019, and contains over 50 pinball machines not seen at Galloping Ghost Arcade, as well as Galloping Ghost Productions, a video game development company that has created its own arcade games, such as Dark Presence (introducing Linda Rizzi née Bohn as Ravona) and Conquering Light.
