= Riverside, Illinois =

- Village
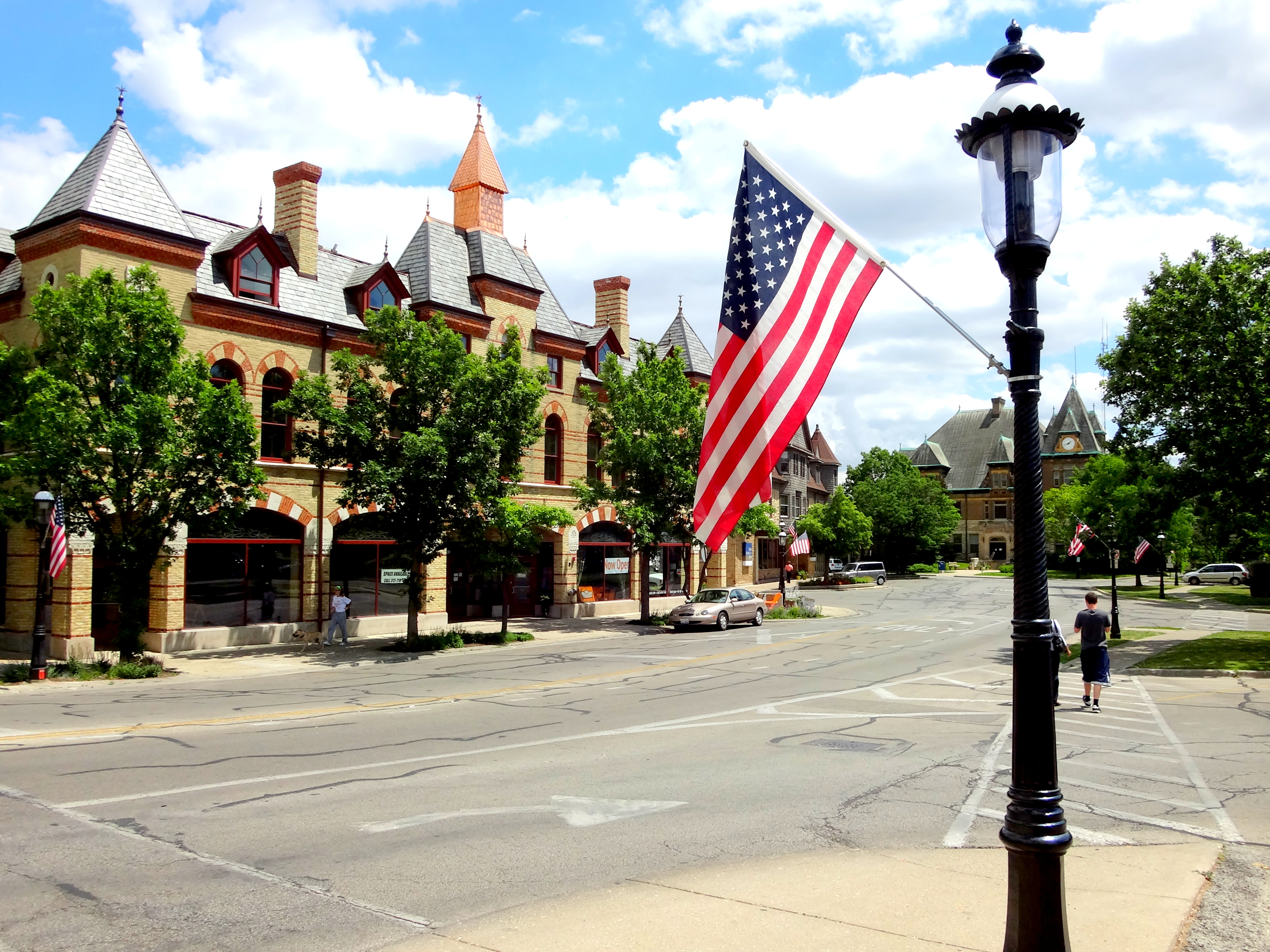
- The Arcade Building and Riverside Town Hall

- Seal
- Motto: "The village in the forest"
- Location of Riverside in Cook County, Illinois.

- Location within Greater Chicago Location within Illinois Location within the United States
- Coordinates: 41°49′51″N 87°48′58″W
- Country: United States
- State: Illinois
- County: Cook
- Township: Riverside
- Incorporated: 1875

Government
  - Type: Board of Trustees and Village President
  - President: Douglas Pollock

Area
  - Total: 2.00 sq mi (5.17 km^{2})
  - Land: 1.98 sq mi (5.12 km^{2})
  - Water: 0.019 sq mi (0.05 km^{2}) 1.00%

Population (2020)
  - Total: 9,298
  - Density: 4,700.0/sq mi (1,814.68/km^{2})
- Down 0.22% from 2000

Standard of living (2022)
  - Median Household Income: $149,464 ± $25,068
  - Median home value: $397,200
- ZIP code(s): 60546
- Area code(s): 708
- Geocode: 54820
- FIPS code: 17-64421
- Website: www.riverside.il.us

Riverside is a suburban village in Cook County, Illinois, United States. The population of the village was 9,298 at the 2020 census. It is a suburb of Chicago, located around 9 miles (14 km) west of downtown Chicago and 2 miles (3 km) outside city limits. The entire village is in the Riverside Landscape Architecture District, designated a National Historic Landmark District in 1970.

== History ==
External videos
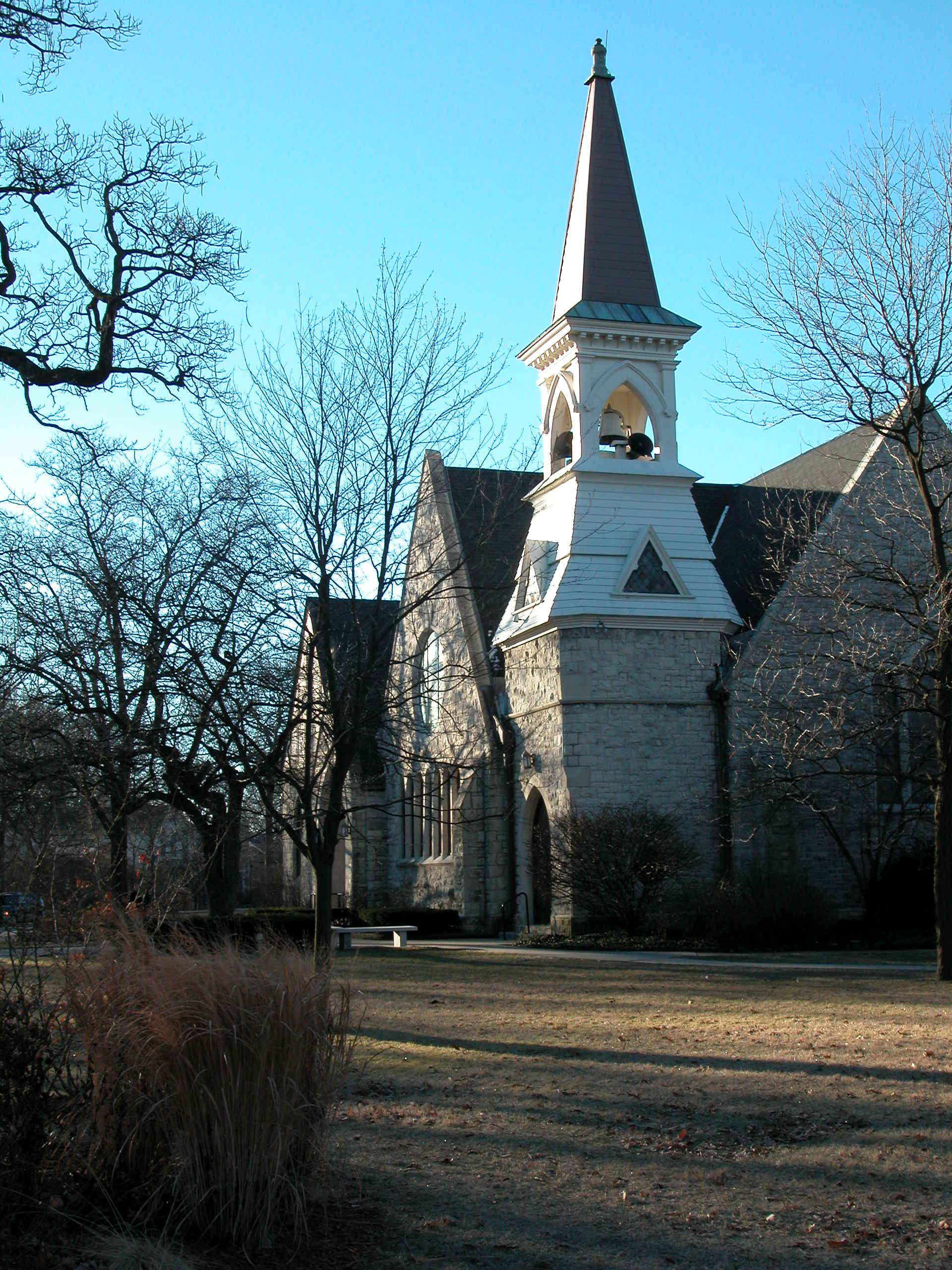
- 10 Towns that Changed America, WTTW, 56:02, segment from 16:20–21:50

Riverside is arguably the first planned suburb (as opposed to a stand-alone community) in the United States, designed in 1869 by Calvert Vaux and Frederick Law Olmsted. In 1863 the Chicago, Burlington and Quincy Railroad was built heading southwest from downtown Chicago to Quincy, Illinois, passing through what is now the Near West Suburban area of Chicago in a western-southwestern direction. This new access to transportation and commerce brought about a significant housing and construction boom in what was once farmland far from the bustle of the city of Chicago.

In 1868, an eastern businessman named Emery E. Childs formed the Riverside Improvement Company, and in 1869 purchased a 1,600-acre (6.5 km^{2}) tract of property along the Des Plaines River and the Chicago, Burlington and Quincy Railroad line. The land was previously owned by David Allen Gage who operated a horse farm on a it called the "Riverside Farm". The site was highly desirable due to its natural oak-hickory forest and its proximity to Chicago. The company commissioned well-known landscape architect Frederick Law Olmsted and his partner, Calvert Vaux, to design a rural bedroom community. The town's plan, which was completed in 1869, called for curvilinear streets, following the land's contours and the winding Des Plaines River. The plan also accorded for a central village square, located at the main railroad station, and a Grand Park system that uses several large parks as a foundation, with 41 smaller triangular parks and plazas located at intersections throughout town to provide for additional green spaces. The Great Chicago Fire of 1871 and the financial Panic of 1873 brought about the demise of the improvement company, bringing new construction nearly to a halt for some time. A village government was established in September 1875, and Olmsted's original development plan remained in force. Building resumed in the following years, with the opening of the Riverside Golf Club in 1893, the striking Chateauesque Riverside Township Hall in 1895, and the Burlington line train station in 1901. Many homes and estates were designed by architects such as Frank Lloyd Wright, Daniel Burnham, Louis Sullivan, William Le Baron Jenney, Joseph Lyman Silsbee, Frederick Clarke Withers, and Calvert Vaux at the time as well.

A major period of residential development came again in the 1920s and late 1930s, when many modest houses were constructed on smaller parcels. The population grew to 7,935 by 1940 and consisted primarily of small proprietors, managers, and professionals who were predominantly of Anglo-American and German American background. The remaining residential areas were developed during the post–World War II boom, and by 1960 the village was almost entirely developed. The population peaked at 10,357 in 1970 and dropped below 8,500 by the mid-1990s.

Riverside has become an architectural museum, which is recognized by the village's National Historic Landmark designation. The village housing stock varies from well-maintained 1920s bungalows and huge Victorian and early-twentieth-century mansions that attract architectural tours led by The Frederick Law Olmsted Society of Riverside. The charming village center houses several restaurants as well as coffee shops, and hosts stores selling antiques and Victorian house fixtures, reflective of the village's older affluent population. The historian Walter Creese called Riverside "The Greatest American Suburb". In celebration of the 2018 Illinois Bicentennial, Riverside was selected as one of the Illinois 200 Great Places by the American Institute of Architects' Illinois chapter, AIA Illinois.

== Geography ==
Riverside is located at 41°49′51″N 87°48′58″W (41.830881, −87.815981). According to the 2010 census, Riverside has a total area of 1.998 square miles (5.17 km^{2}), of which 1.98 square miles (5.13 km^{2}) (or 99.1%) is land and 0.018 square miles (0.05 km^{2}) (or 0.9%) is water. Bordering suburbs include North Riverside to the north, Berwyn to the east, Stickney and Forest View to the southeast, Lyons and McCook to the south, and Brookfield to the west. The Des Plaines River runs through the village along an area called Swan Pond.

== Demographics ==
Historical population
Census	Pop.	Note	%±
1900	1,551		—
1910	1,702		9.7%
1920	2,532		48.8%
1930	6,770		167.4%
1940	7,935		17.2%
1950	9,153		15.3%
1960	9,750		6.5%
1970	10,357		6.2%
1980	9,236		−10.8%
1990	8,774		−5.0%
2000	8,895		1.4%
2010	8,875		−0.2%
2020	9,298		4.8%
U.S. Decennial Census

=== Racial and ethnic composition ===
Riverside village, Illinois – Racial and ethnic composition Note: the US Census treats Hispanic/Latino as an ethnic category. This table excludes Latinos from the racial categories and assigns them to a separate category. Hispanics/Latinos may be of any race.
Race / Ethnicity (NH = Non-Hispanic)	Pop 2000	Pop 2010	Pop 2020	% 2000	% 2010	% 2020
White alone (NH)	8,168	7,535	7,074	91.83%	84.90%	76.08%
Black or African American alone (NH)	23	110	161	0.26%	1.24%	1.73%
Native American or Alaska Native alone (NH)	7	7	4	0.08%	0.08%	0.04%
Asian alone (NH)	140	184	200	1.57%	2.07%	2.15%
Pacific Islander alone (NH)	1	1	0	0.01%	0.01%	0.00%
Other race alone (NH)	5	19	41	0.06%	0.21%	0.44%
Mixed race or Multiracial (NH)	62	84	298	0.70%	0.95%	3.20%
Hispanic or Latino (any race)	489	935	1,520	5.50%	10.54%	16.35%
Total	8,895	8,875	9,298	100.00%	100.00%	100.00%

=== 2020 census ===
As of the 2020 census, Riverside had a population of 9,298. The population density was 4,658.32 inhabitants per square mile (1,798.59/km^{2}). The median age was 42.6 years. 25.0% of residents were under the age of 18 and 17.3% of residents were 65 years of age or older. For every 100 females there were 93.8 males, and for every 100 females age 18 and over there were 92.0 males age 18 and over.

100.0% of residents lived in urban areas, while 0.0% lived in rural areas.

There were 3,549 households in Riverside, of which 36.7% had children under the age of 18 living in them. Of all households, 58.6% were married-couple households, 13.2% were households with a male householder and no spouse or partner present, and 24.0% were households with a female householder and no spouse or partner present. About 24.3% of all households were made up of individuals and 11.6% had someone living alone who was 65 years of age or older.

There were 3,720 housing units at an average density of 1,863.73 per square mile (719.59/km^{2}), of which 4.6% were vacant. The homeowner vacancy rate was 1.4% and the rental vacancy rate was 7.2%.

=== Income and poverty ===
The median income for a household in the village was $120,336, and the median income for a family was $137,963. Males had a median income of $75,883 versus $56,709 for females. The per capita income for the village was $55,882. About 2.1% of families and 2.7% of the population were below the poverty line, including 2.9% of those under age 18 and 2.8% of those age 65 or over.

== Historic district ==
- Riverside Historic District
- U.S. National Register of Historic Places
- U.S. National Historic Landmark District
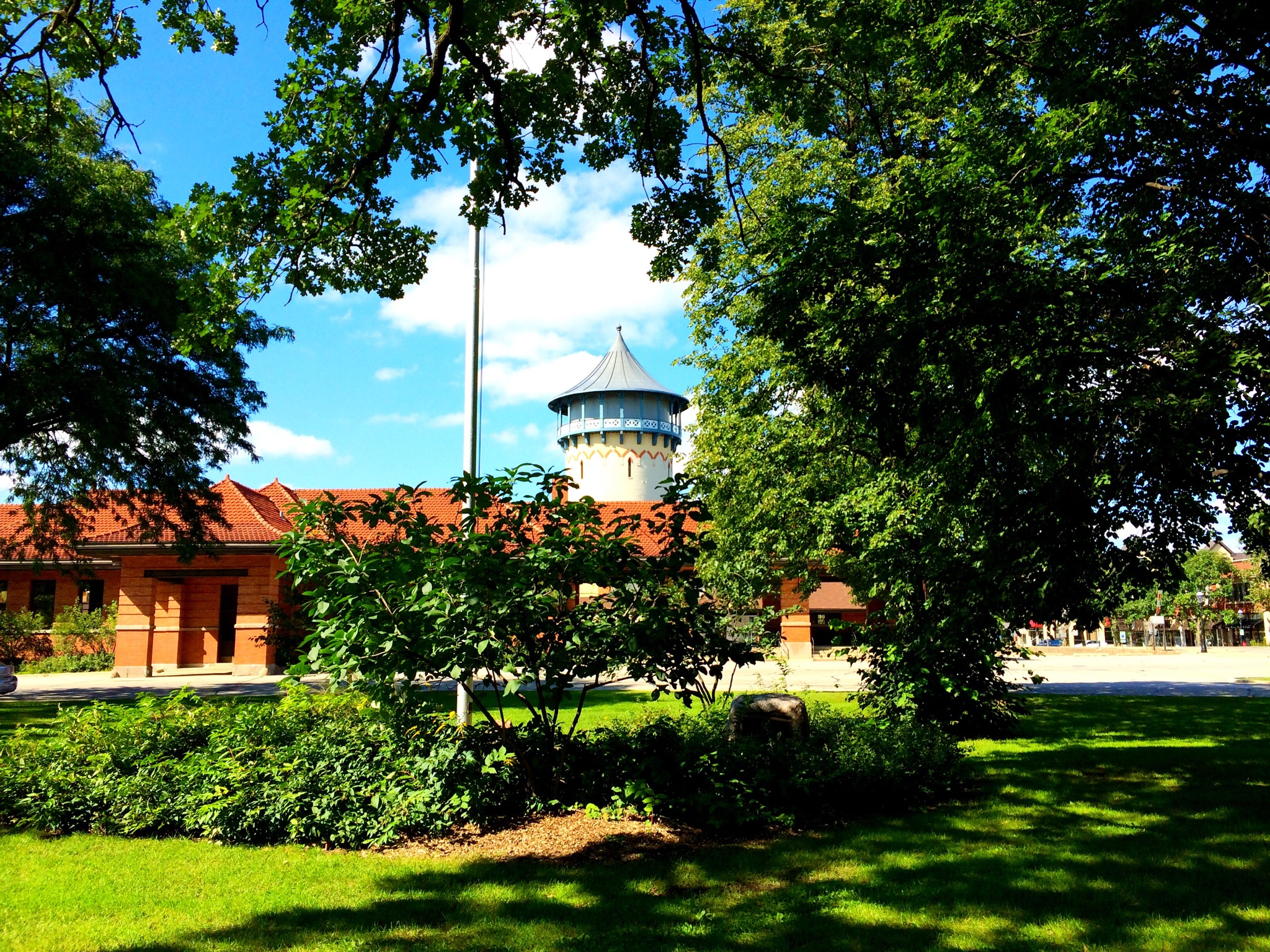
- The Riverside Water Tower from Guthrie Park

- Location within Illinois Location within the United States
- Location: Riverside, Illinois
- Coordinates: 41°49′54″N 87°48′49″W
- Area: 1,500 acres (610 ha)
- Built: 1868
- Architects: Calvert Vaux; Frederick Law Olmsted; Frank Lloyd Wright
- NRHP reference No.: 69000055

Significant dates
- Added to NRHP: September 15, 1969
- Designated NHLD: August 29, 1970

The entire village is located within the Riverside Historic District, also known as Riverside Landscape Architecture District, which is designated a National Historic Landmark District for its status as one of the first planned suburbs in the United States. It was planned and designed by Calvert Vaux and Frederick Law Olmsted and features a number of architecturally distinguished buildings. Throughout the district, winding roads and green areas along the river create a park-like setting.

The Water Tower in Riverside was designed by Jenney, Schermerhorn & Bogart, Architects and Engineers. Like the Water Tower in Chicago, the Riverside Water Tower is a well-known landmark in the area. It is both a water tank and a decorative element in the village-scape. The Riverside district includes the streets, parkways, parklands, and historic gas street lighting in the area bounded by 26th St., Harlem and Ogden Aves., the Des Plaines River, and Forbes Rd. Also included are the many homes and estates designed by architects such as Frank Lloyd Wright, Daniel Burnham, Louis Sullivan, William Le Baron Jenney, Frederick Clarke Withers, and Calvert Vaux. The F. F. Tomek House and the Coonley House have individually received National Historic Landmark status.

All but about 100 acres (40 ha) of the village was designated a National Historic Landmark district in 1970. The designation was expanded in 2023 to cover the rest of the village. A plaque memorializing the village was installed in 2025.

== Government ==
Riverside is mostly in Illinois's 4th congressional district, with a small portion in Illinois's 3rd congressional district.

The United States Postal Service operates the Riverside Post Office at 45 East Burlington Street and the North Riverside Post Office at 7300 West 25th Street.

== Education ==
Riverside is served by Riverside School District 96 for public schools. District 96 has 4 elementary schools, and one junior high school. High school District 208 serves Riverside high school students.

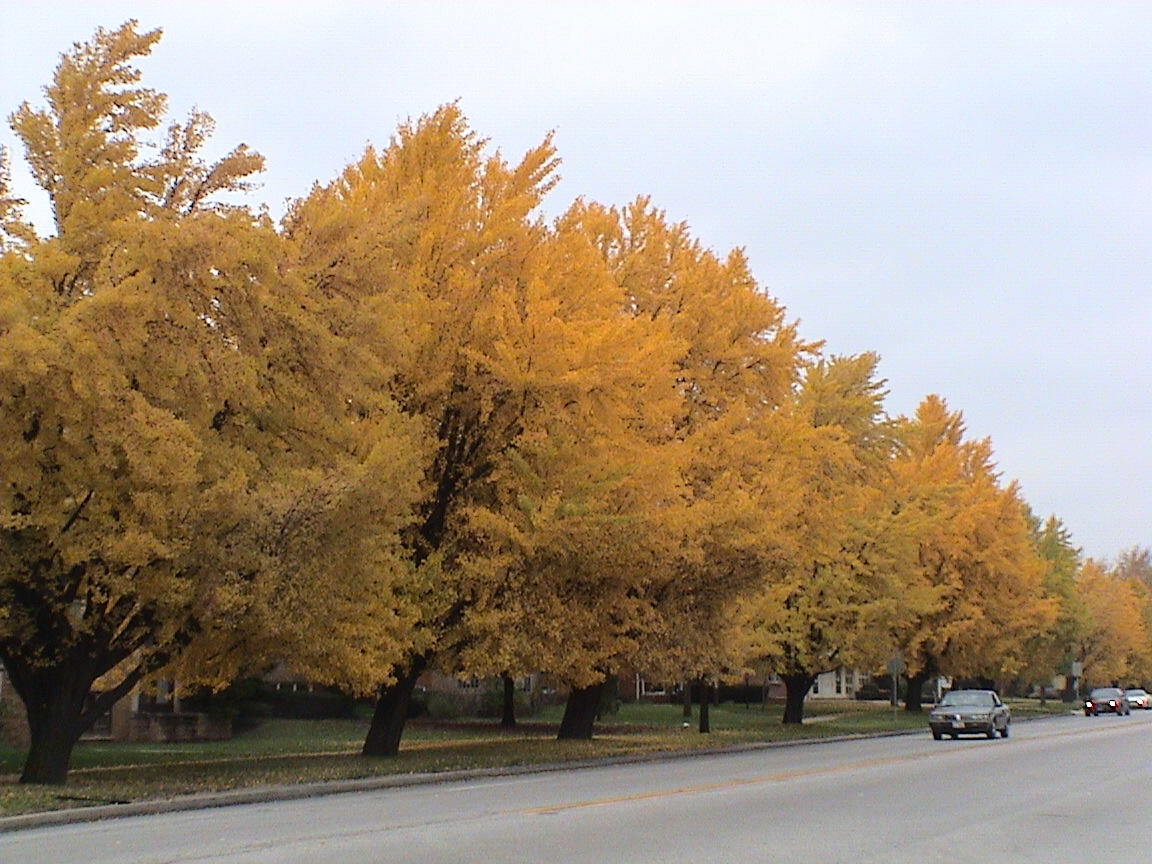
Ginkgos along Harlem Avenue in Riverside

The elementary schools are:

- Central Elementary School located at 61 Woodside Road
- Ames School located at 86 Southcote Road
- Blythe Park School located at 735 Leesley Road
- Hollywood School (in Brookfield) located at 3423 Hollywood Avenue

The middle school is:

- L. J. Hauser Junior High School located at 65 Woodside Road

The high school is:

- Riverside Brookfield High School, locally known as RB, is located at 160 Ridgewood Road

Private schools include:

- Riverside Presbyterian Pre-School
- St. Paul's Building Blocks Pre-School
- St. Mary Catholic Elementary School

== Transportation ==
Riverside is served by the BNSF Line with a station for Metra commuter trains operating between Aurora and Chicago. Hollywood and Harlem Avenue Metra stations are nearby.

Pace provides bus service on routes 302, 307 and 331 connecting Riverside to destinations across the region.

== Notable people ==
- Robert Todd Lincoln Beckwith, last descendant of Abraham Lincoln
- Clare Briggs, pioneering cartoonist of domestic life and creator of the first continuity daily newspaper comic strip
- Arthur T. Broche, Illinois state representative
- Patrick Creadon, filmmaker
- Jean Fenn, opera singer
- George Hunt, Illinois Attorney General
- Johnny "Red" Kerr, center and power forward with the Philadelphia 76ers and Baltimore Bullets; coach with the Chicago Bulls and Phoenix Suns; longtime Bulls broadcaster
- Tom Kondla, center with the Minnesota Pipers and Houston Mavericks
- Ring Lardner, newspaper and short story writer
- "Screwy" Claude Maddox, criminal ally of Al Capone
- Martin E. Marty, scholar of religion
- Frank Nitti, criminal ally of Capone
- Judy Baar Topinka, state politician; Illinois State Comptroller and Illinois State Treasurer

== In popular culture ==
- Parts of the movie The Lake House were filmed at the Riverside train station, the former Henninger's Pharmacy, and at the Sidney Allen home at 84 Riverside Road.
- The made-for-TV movie In the Company of Darkness was filmed throughout Riverside.
- The 2004 movie Christmas with the Kranks was set in Riverside, although it was filmed in California and Canada.
- Portions of Season 4 of the FX series Fargo were filmed in Riverside as a stand-in for Kansas City of the 1950s.

== Business ==
The Central Business District, located around the Riverside Metra station, has a collection of shops, several cafes, banks, and wealth management offices.

== See also ==
- List of National Historic Landmarks in Illinois
- National Register of Historic Places listings in Cook County, Illinois
- Planned communities
- Garden city movement
- Garden real estate
- Riverside (Metra)
