= Riverside School District 96 =

School district in Illinois, United States

Address
- 3340 Harlem Avenue Riverside, Illinois, 60546; United States

District information
- Type: Public
- Grades: PreK–8
- NCES District ID: 1733990

Students and staff
- Students: 1,679

Other information
- Website: www.district96.org

Riverside School District 96 (D96) is a school district headquartered in Riverside, Illinois.

It includes Riverside, most of North Riverside, and parts of Brookfield.

Martha Ryan-Toye became superintendent in 2016. She was previously employed by the River Forest District 90. In 2020 the D96 board gave her a five-year renewal.

== Schools ==
Schools are in Riverside unless otherwise stated.

Junior high school

- Hauser Junior High School

Elementary schools

- Ames Elementary School
- Blythe Park Elementary School
- Central Elementary School
- Hollywood Elementary School (Brookfield)
