= Lyons, Illinois =

- Village
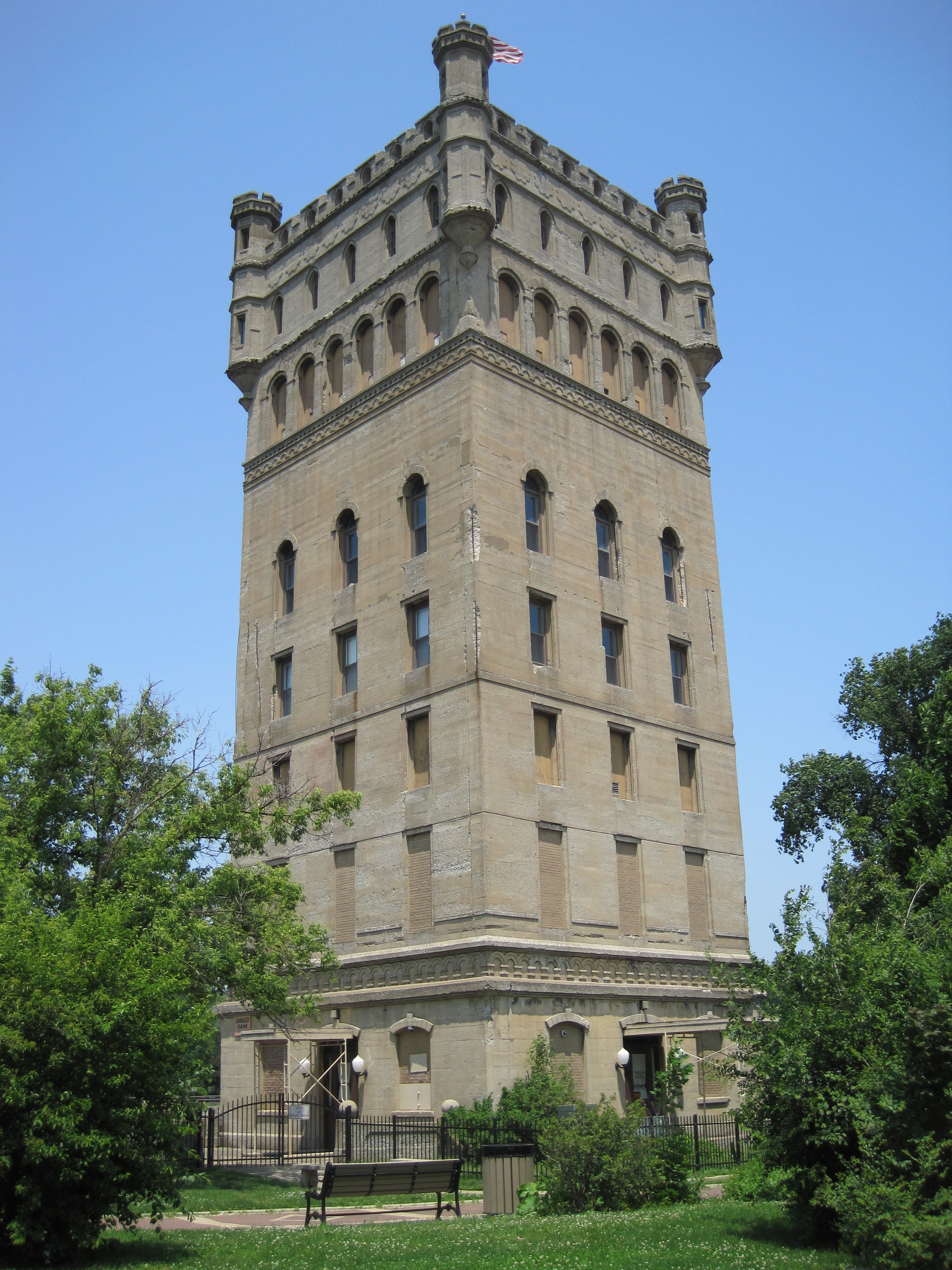
- Hofmann Tower

- Seal
- Motto: Gateway to the West
- Location of Lyons in Cook County, Illinois.

- Location within Greater Chicago Location within Illinois Location within the United States
- Coordinates: 41°48′48″N 87°49′19″W
- Country: United States
- State: Illinois
- County: Cook
- Incorporated: 1888

Government
  - Mayor: Christopher Getty

Area
  - Total: 2.27 sq mi (5.89 km^{2})
  - Land: 2.21 sq mi (5.72 km^{2})
  - Water: 0.066 sq mi (0.17 km^{2})
- Elevation: 620 ft (190 m)

Population (2020)
  - Total: 10,817
  - Density: 4,900.2/sq mi (1,891.99/km^{2})
- Time zone: UTC-6 (CST)
  - Summer (DST): UTC-5 (CDT)
- ZIP Code(s): 60534
- Area code: 708
- FIPS code: 17-45434
- Wikimedia Commons: Lyons, Illinois
- Website: www.villageoflyons-il.net

Lyons is a village in Cook County, Illinois, United States. Per the 2020 census, the population was 10,817. The Chicago Portage National Historic Site is located in Lyons.

== History ==
Lyons was incorporated in 1888, though activity in the area dates back much further. In 1673 French Explorer Louis Joliet and Jesuit missionary Father Pierre Marquette left Green Bay, Wisconsin, by canoe in search of a western passage to the Pacific. As they traveled into the Spanish-controlled area of Louisiana, they realized that the mighty Mississippi River drained into the already well-known Gulf of Mexico. With winter approaching, they headed north as quickly as possible. To save time, the Potawatomi who were with them were encouraged to change their route to the Illinois River. The shortcut led to the Des Plaines River and caused the French travelers to discover “Le Portage.” This half-mile wide area of land connecting the Chicago River and the Des Plaines River, over which they could carry their canoes and supplies, was to become the discovery for which they would both become famous. Later known as the Chicago Portage, this small area became the “Gateway to the West” and was used by thousands of early settlers and traders traveling both east and west. The discovery of “Le Portage” was part of the impetus that led to Chicago becoming a center for world trade.

Louis Joliet was the first to propose a canal between the two waterways, which would be constructed around 200 years later in 1848 with the construction of the Illinois and Michigan Canal. In time, the part of the I&M Canal that connected the south branch of the Chicago River with the Des Plaines River was replaced with the Chicago Sanitary and Ship Canal, which was completed in 1900. Today, a statue stands in Lyons at the Chicago Portage National Historic Sight just north of Interstate 55 along Harlem Avenue, commemorating this historic National Heritage Corridor which stretches southwest through La Salle, Illinois.

From the early 1960s through the late 1980s, Lyons was known for its notorious links to organized crime. Mayor William Smith, for whom a park was named, was being subjected to a federal corruption investigation when he died from cancer in 1989. During the 1970s and 1980s, the small town was littered with strip clubs and bars along its Ogden Avenue corridor. It was often referred to an area of east Ogden Avenue known as "Driftland", due to the amount of drifters in the area. However, the village changed dramatically in the 1990s, and none of the strip clubs and most licensed bars no longer exist. Lyons continues to thrive and attract businesses and new residents. It is now a quiet residential suburb supported by several grammar schools, a middle school, and a well-maintained park district.

Lyons is a working-class area, though much of the nearby manufacturing work has dried up (e.g., Electro-Motive & Reynolds Aluminum) small specialty businesses have emerged. The city has historically been home to a large Polish American community since the turn of the 20th century, which is reflected in three of the town's street names: Pulaski after Revolutionary War hero Casimir Pulaski as well as Warsaw and Kraków. Lyons is the subject of a recently published book by Mark Athitakis, a native of Lyons, detailing the town's rich and colorful history.

== Geography ==
Lyons is located at 41°48′48″N 87°49′19″W (41.813258, -87.821812).

According to the 2021 census gazetteer files, Lyons has a total area of 2.27 square miles (5.88 km^{2}), of which 2.21 square miles (5.72 km^{2}) (or 97.05%) is land and 0.07 square miles (0.18 km^{2}) (or 2.95%) is water.

== Demographics ==
Historical population
Census	Pop.	Note	%±
1880	486		—
1890	732		50.6%
1900	951		29.9%
1910	1,483		55.9%
1920	2,564		72.9%
1930	4,787		86.7%
1940	4,960		3.6%
1950	6,120		23.4%
1960	9,936		62.4%
1970	11,124		12.0%
1980	9,925		−10.8%
1990	9,828		−1.0%
2000	10,255		4.3%
2010	10,729		4.6%
2020	10,817		0.8%
U.S. Decennial Census; 2010 2020

=== Racial and ethnic composition ===
Lyons village, Illinois – Racial and ethnic composition Note: the US Census treats Hispanic/Latino as an ethnic category. This table excludes Latinos from the racial categories and assigns them to a separate category. Hispanics/Latinos may be of any race.
Race / Ethnicity (NH = Non-Hispanic)	Pop 2000	Pop 2010	Pop 2020	% 2000	% 2010	% 2020
White alone (NH)	8,079	5,889	4,458	78.78%	54.89%	41.21%
Black or African American alone (NH)	98	419	464	0.96%	3.91%	4.29%
Native American or Alaska Native alone (NH)	12	16	15	0.12%	0.15%	0.14%
Asian alone (NH)	143	143	179	1.39%	1.33%	1.65%
Pacific Islander alone (NH)	4	1	1	0.04%	0.01%	0.01%
Other race alone (NH)	9	25	43	0.09%	0.23%	0.40%
Mixed race or Multiracial (NH)	242	123	269	2.36%	1.15%	2.49%
Hispanic or Latino (any race)	1,668	4,113	5,388	16.27%	38.34%	49.81%
Total	10,255	10,729	10,817	100.00%	100.00%	100.00%

=== 2020 census ===
As of the 2020 census, Lyons had a population of 10,817. The median age was 38.7 years. 21.5% of residents were under the age of 18 and 15.7% of residents were 65 years of age or older. For every 100 females there were 103.3 males, and for every 100 females age 18 and over there were 102.0 males age 18 and over.

100.0% of residents lived in urban areas, while 0.0% lived in rural areas.

There were 4,144 households in Lyons, including 2,333 families, and 31.1% of households had children under the age of 18 living in them. Of all households, 38.3% were married-couple households, 25.4% were households with a male householder and no spouse or partner present, and 28.3% were households with a female householder and no spouse or partner present.

There were 4,415 housing units, of which 6.1% were vacant. The homeowner vacancy rate was 1.6% and the rental vacancy rate was 6.8%. The population density was 4,756.82 inhabitants per square mile (1,836.62/km^{2}), and there were 4,415 housing units at an average density of 1,941.51 per square mile (749.62/km^{2}).

=== Demographic estimates ===
Non-family households accounted for 36.10% of households. The average household size was 3.66 and the average family size was 2.82.

Demographic estimates also reported 7.1% of residents from age 18 to 24, 30% from 25 to 44, and 22.4% from 45 to 64.

=== Income and poverty ===
The median income for a household in the village was $66,005, and the median income for a family was $76,892. Males had a median income of $40,936 versus $33,315 for females. The per capita income for the village was $28,221. About 6.9% of families and 9.3% of the population were below the poverty line, including 10.0% of those under age 18 and 10.5% of those age 65 or over.

== Government ==
Lyons is in Illinois's 4th congressional district.

The United States Postal Service operates the Lyons Post Office at 7836 West Ogden Avenue.

== Transportation ==
Pace provides bus service on multiple routes connecting Lyons to destinations across the region.

== Education ==
Lyons is served by the Lyons Elementary School District 103, which operates 5 elementary schools, two of which are in Lyons (Costello, and Robinson Elementary Schools). The other 3 schools are Home, Edison (Both in Stickney), and Lincoln, which is in Brookfield. Middle school students attend George Washington Middle School.

High school students from Lyons attend J. Sterling Morton West High School, located in Berwyn.

Lyons operates the Lyons Public Library at 4209 Joliet Avenue.
