= O'Hare Flyer =

Proposed airport rail link in Chicago, Illinois

Overview
- Service type: Airport rail link
- Status: Planning
- Locale: Chicago, Illinois, United States
- First service: 2031 (proposed)
- Website: ohareflyer.com

Route
- Termini: West Loop, Chicago; O'Hare International Airport
- Stops: 2–3
- Distance travelled: 20 miles (32 km)
- Average journey time: 15 minutes
- Service frequency: Every 15 minutes
- Lines used: City of Chicago right-of-way UP Rockwell Subdivision; CSX Altenheim Subdivision; CN Waukesha Subdivision

On-board services
- Baggage facilities: Luggage racks
- Other facilities: Concierge service

Technical
- Rolling stock: Battery electric multiple units
- Track gauge: 4 ft 8 1/2 in (1,435 mm) standard gauge
- Electrification: Third rail, 750 V DC (at endpoints)
- Operating speed: 80 mph (130 km/h) (avg.); 110 mph (180 km/h) (top)
- Track owner: O'Hare Flyer LLC

The O'Hare Flyer is a proposed airport rail link between Chicago's West Loop and O'Hare International Airport. The $2.25 billion private project would use existing freight rail right-of-way for the majority of the route and estimates an end-to-end travel time of 15 minutes. The service would supplement existing rail service available by the CTA's Blue Line and Metra's North Central Service.

The company, O'Hare Flyer LLC, anticipates construction to begin in 2028 and claims it will partner with local labor unions, with revenue service beginning as early as 2031.

== Route ==
Project leaders envision the route running in existing freight rail corridors, but would utilize its own dedicated track. The line would be single tracked most of the way except for a 6-mile (9.7 km) double track section allowing trains to pass midway along the route. The route would require an agreement between three Class I freight railroads to occupy their right-of-way.

In downtown Chicago, the line would begin at a new station constructed near the Old Main Post Office utilizing city-owned land underneath Canal Street. The station would be within close proximity of Chicago Union Station for connections with Amtrak and Metra trains, the intercity bus station, and "L" service at Clinton station on the Blue Line, as well as various CTA bus routes.

Departing to O'Hare, trains would travel south before turning west around 16th Street along the Union Pacific's Rockwell Subdivision. Developers have not identified plans to navigate constrained coach yards owned by BNSF or Amtrak south of the downtown terminal or if a tunnel would be constructed the length of Canal Street. Project leaders cited newly available land around Union Pacific's Global 1 yard as a contributing factor in making the line feasible. At Rockwell Street, the line would shift to CSX's Altenheim Subdivision. As of the project's public announcement, a Letter of Intent had been reached with CSX. At Madison Street in Forest Park, the line transitions northwest onto the Canadian National's Waukesha Subdivision. North of Belmont Avenue in Franklin Park, trains would parallel the North Central Service, which provides an existing rail link to O'Hare, but would bypass the line's intermediate stations at Belmont Avenue/Franklin Park, Schiller Park, and Rosemont.

Upon reaching O'Hare, the line would diverge off from the Canadian National right-of-way onto 1.5 miles (2.4 km) of newly constructed track to directly serve the terminals. A 90-foot (27 m) tall flyover is being proposed to cross two taxiways before running parallel to the Airport Transit System (ATS). The airport station would be located in front of Terminal 2, with walkways extending for direct access to Terminals 1 and 3. Access to Terminal 5 would require a transfer to the ATS. The station would have a direct connection with the Blue Line at O'Hare station. Transfers to Metra, Pace buses, intercity buses, and other ground transportation would be available via the ATS at the O'Hare Multimodal Facility.

== Stations and service ==
The line is expected to have two stations, both being newly built for the proposal. Charging infrastructure is to be constructed to allow trains to recharge between runs. Trains plan to operate daily every 15 minutes between 4 a.m. and 10 p.m.

It would be the first rail link in North America to run non-stop solely between downtown and the airport, with no intermediate stops or service continuing further.

Officials have proposed one intermediate stop in Forest Park near the CTA Blue Line station. No agreements have been reached yet, and no other locations are being considered anywhere else on the route.

Location	Community area	Station	Connections
O'Hare International Airport	O'Hare	Terminal 2	List of airlines and destinations; Chicago "L": Blue (at O'Hare); via Airport Transit System: Metra: North Central Service (at O'Hare Transfer); Pace Bus: Pulse Dempster Line, 250, 330; Intercity buses: Peoria Charter, Van Galder Bus Company, Wisconsin Coach Lines
Forest Park		Forest Park	Chicago "L": Blue (at Forest Park); Pace Bus: 301, 303, 305, 308, 310, 317, 318
Downtown Chicago	Near West Side	Old Main Post Office	Chicago "L": Blue (at Clinton); CTA buses: 7 37 60 157; At Chicago Union Station (approx. 2 blocks north): Amtrak (long-distance): California Zephyr, Cardinal, City of New Orleans, Empire Builder, Floridian, Lake Shore Limited, Southwest Chief, Texas Eagle; Amtrak (intercity): Blue Water, Borealis, Hiawatha, Illini and Saluki, Illinois Zephyr and Carl Sandburg, Lincoln Service, Pere Marquette, Wolverine; Metra: BNSF, Heritage Corridor, Milwaukee District North, Milwaukee District West, North Central Service, SouthWest Service; CTA buses: 1 28 121 124 125 126 130 151 156; Pace Bus: 755; Intercity buses: Amtrak Thruway, Greyhound, Megabus; At Chicago Bus Station (approx. 2 blocks west): Intercity buses: Greyhound, Barons Bus Lines, Flixbus

== Opposition ==
On September 14, 2026, the Village Board of River Forest unanimously adopted a resolution opposing the O'Hare Flyer project. The board urged its sponsors to "cease advancing their plans and explore alternative route options." The resolution also called on state and federal officials, including Senate President Don Harmon and House Speaker Chris Welch, to not take any steps that would let the project move forward. Village officials cited pedestrian safety, emergency response times, traffic and crossing delays, and the line's passage through the Thatcher Woods forest preserve. Melrose Park Mayor Ron Serpico and Cook County Commissioner Maggie Trevor, whose district includes several communities along the route, sent letters opposing the project as proposed. The West Central Municipal Conference, a planning organization for west suburban municipalities, also opposed it, citing the effect of frequent rail closures on north-south corridors on commutes and emergency response. Residents along the route have organized to oppose the project. Concerns raised at public meetings have included noise and vibration, safety at street-level crossings, property values, and the lack of detail on how crossings would be handled. At an October 3 meeting in River Forest, Welch said he could "make it a little difficult" for the project and that state agencies' budgets "can be held up at budget time" if they acted against the communities he represents, while adding that he wanted to hear "both the good and the bad." Opponents have pointed to Metra's draft Systemwide Network Plan, released October 16, 2026, which proposes more frequent service between Union Station and an upgraded O'Hare Transfer station on the North Central Service, as an alternative to a private line. Joseph Schwieterman of DePaul University's Chaddick Institute identified the project's reliance on debt financing, the need for strong ridership to service that debt, and possible construction cost overruns as risks. The project's sponsors have said that "several aspects of the project are being misunderstood or misrepresented" and have sought meetings with River Forest and other communities.

== Rolling stock ==
No rolling stock has been selected yet, although the company plans to use four battery electric multiple units from Stadler or Siemens. Trains would average 80 mph (130 km/h) and include luggage racks and concierge service. The team stated that each train would consist of two four-car train sets, with a total of eight cars per train.

== Organization and funding ==
O'Hare Flyer LLC was founded by Mark Walbrun, Dave Lundy, and Kristi Lafleur, who all have previous experience in transportation and working within the Chicago metropolitan area. The project had been in development for three years prior to its public announcement in August 2026.

Being a private proposal, the project is being funded through debt capital. Fares, which have not been shared but are determined to be more than the Blue Line ($2.50–$5) but less than taxi or rideshare service (typically exceeds $50), would cover the cost of operations and repaying debt. The company has also budgeted in the possibility of a revenue sharing agreement with the City of Chicago. It has not been disclosed how much funding has already been accrued from investors, but the company is pursuing an additional $18 million during the second round.

The company plans to execute a Project Labor Agreement with the Chicago and Cook County Building and Construction Trades Council to use skilled union labor and local contractors for construction. A Memorandum of Understanding has already been reached between the two parties.

Before construction can begin, an understanding must be reached between Union Pacific, CSX, and Canadian National to lease the railroads' right-of-way. Several agreements would also need to be reached between the City of Chicago. Additionally, the project would require coordination from federal agencies, such as the Federal Railroad Administration, the Surface Transportation Board, and/or the Federal Aviation Administration.

== See also ==
- Chicago Express Loop, a failed private proposal to bring express service between O'Hare and downtown
- Brightline, a private railroad in Florida with an airport rail link primarily utilizing existing transportation corridors
- CTA Orange Line, a rapid transit line that serves Chicago's other airport, Midway International Airport
- Rail services that link Chicago to other regional airports:
  - Amtrak Hiawatha and Borealis, intercity trains that serve Milwaukee Mitchell International Airport
  - South Shore Line, a regional rail service that connects to Gary/Chicago International Airport and South Bend International Airport
- Other North American airport rail services with similar context:
  - RTD A Line (Denver, Colorado)
  - SEPTA Airport Line (Philadelphia, Pennsylvania)
  - Union Pearson Express (Toronto, Canada)
