= O'Hare (disambiguation) =

O'Hare International Airport is a major airport in Chicago.

O'Hare may also refer to:

- USS O'Hare (DD-889), a US Navy destroyer
- O'Hare (surname), a surname (and list of people with the name)
  - Edward O'Hare, a U.S. Naval aviator and the namesake of the airport and the ship
- O'Hare, Chicago, a US community area
  - O'Hare station, a rapid transit terminal in Chicago, Illinois
    - O'Hare station train crash, an operational incident at O'Hare station
  - O'Hare Transfer station, a commuter rail station in Chicago, Illinois
- O'Hare Flyer, a proposed airport rail link from downtown Chicago to O'Hare Airport
- O'Hare (band), a Yugoslav 1960s rock band
- O'Hare Air, a fictional company in The Lorax (film).

== See also ==
- Collingwood O'Hare, animation studio
- O'Hara (disambiguation)
- Ohaře, a village in the Czech Republic
- Hare (disambiguation)
