= Prospect Heights station =

Commuter rail station in Prospect Heights, Illinois

Prospect Heights

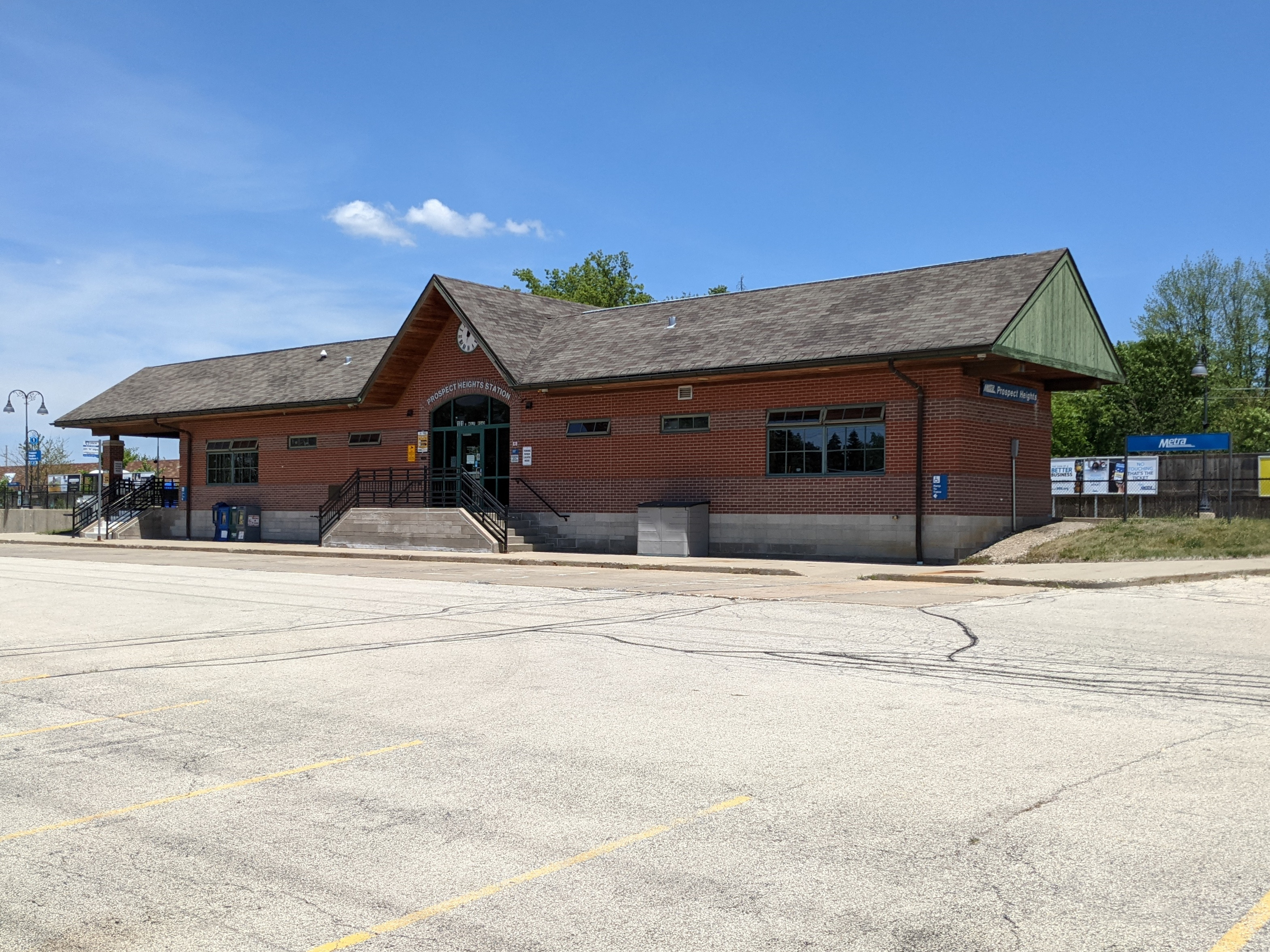
- Prospect Heights station in June 2021

General information
- Location: 55 South Wolf Road; Prospect Heights, Illinois
- Coordinates: 42.0923°N 87.9080°W
- Owner: Metra
- Line: CN Waukesha Subdivision
- Platforms: 2 side platforms
- Tracks: 2
- Connections: Pace Buses

Construction
- Accessible: Yes

Other information
- Fare zone: 3

History
- Opened: August 19, 1996

Passengers
- 2018: 304 (average weekday) ▲14.3%
- Rank: 144 out of 236

Services
Preceding station	Metra	Following station
Wheeling toward Antioch	North Central Service	O'Hare Transfer toward Union Station
Track layout
Location

Prospect Heights is a station on Metra's North Central Service in Prospect Heights, Illinois. The station is 26.6 miles (42.8 km) away from Union Station, the southern terminus of the line. In Metra's zone-based fare system, Prospect Heights is in zone 3. As of 2018, Prospect Heights is the 144th busiest of Metra's 236 non-downtown stations, with an average of 304 weekday boardings.

As of February 15, 2024, Prospect Heights is served by 12 trains (six in each direction) on weekdays.

== Bus connections ==
Pace

- 221 Wolf Road
