= Vernon Hills station =

Commuter rail station in Vernon Hills, Illinois

Vernon Hills

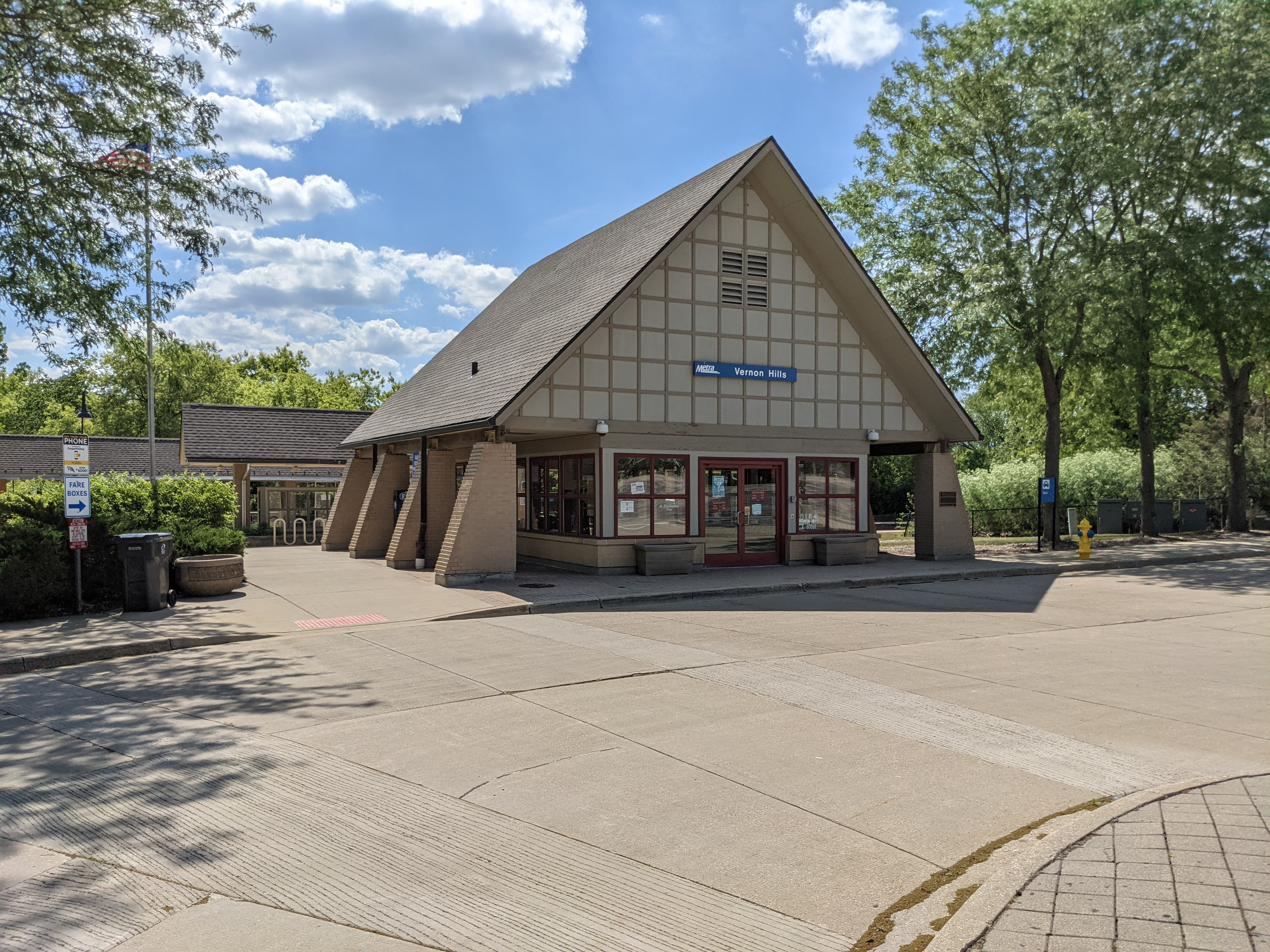
- Vernon Hills station in June 2021

General information
- Location: 75 East Route 45; Vernon Hills, Illinois
- Coordinates: 42.2156°N 87.9646°W
- Owner: Village of Vernon Hills
- Line: CN Waukesha Subdivision
- Platforms: 2 side platforms
- Tracks: 2

Construction
- Accessible: Yes

Other information
- Fare zone: 4

History
- Opened: August 19, 1996

Passengers
- 2018: 409 (average weekday) ▲10.5%
- Rank: 118 out of 236

Services
Preceding station	Metra	Following station
Mundelein toward Antioch	North Central Service	Prairie View toward Union Station
Track layout
Location

Vernon Hills is a station on Metra's North Central Service in Vernon Hills, Illinois. The station is 35.7 miles (57.5 km) away from Chicago Union Station, the southern terminus of the line. In Metra's zone-based fare system, Vernon Hills is in zone 4. As of 2018, Vernon Hills is the 118th busiest of Metra's 236 non-downtown stations, with an average of 409 weekday boardings. Vernon Hills station is an A-Framed structure with an analog clock tower emerging from the right slope. The canopy on the platform is also an A-Framed structure.

As of February 15, 2024, Vernon Hills is served by all 14 trains (seven in each direction) on weekdays.
