= Prairie View station =

Commuter rail station in Prairie View, Illinois

Prairie View

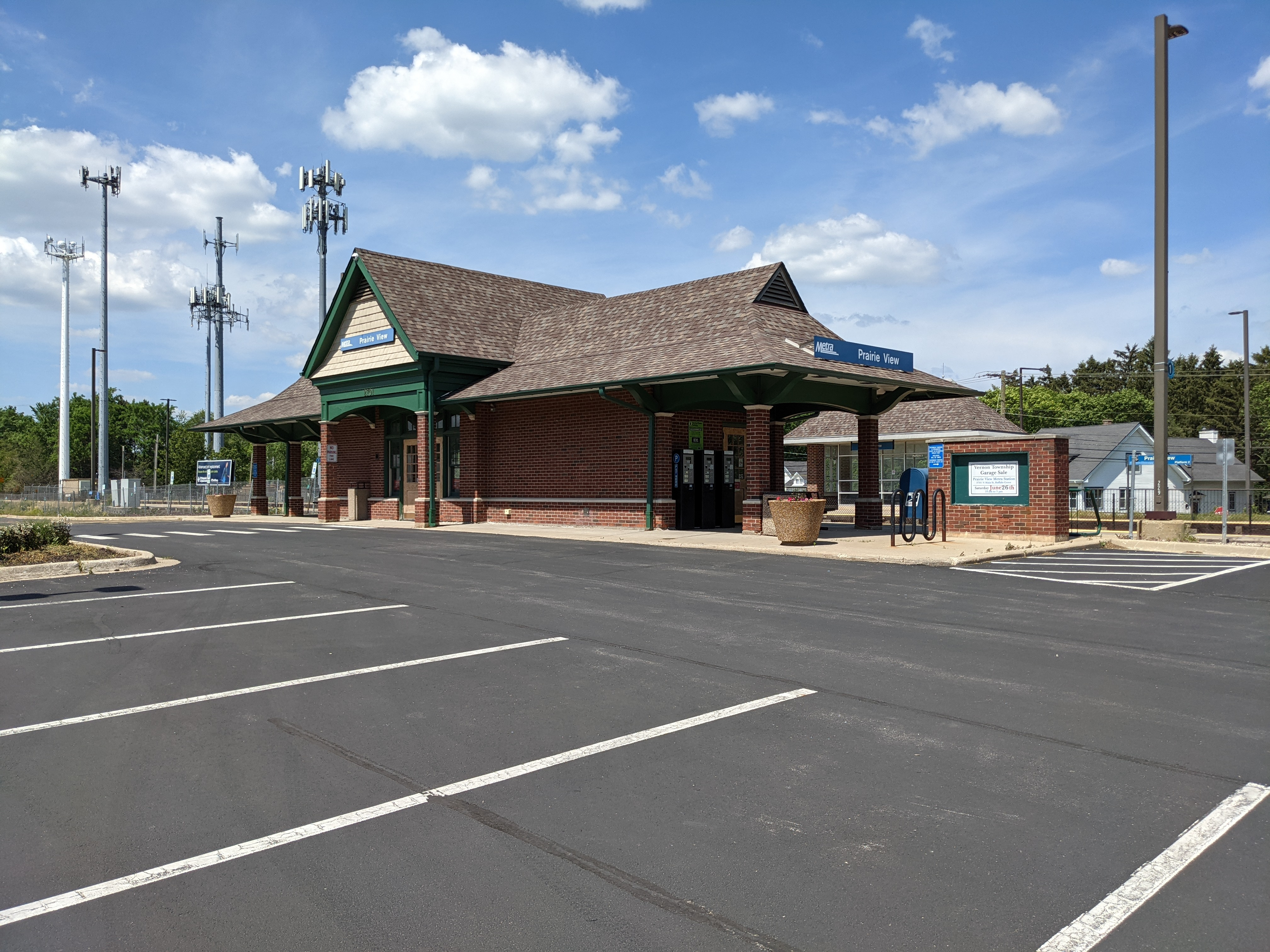
- Prairie View Metra station in June 2021

General information
- Location: 2701 Main Street; Prairie View, Illinois
- Coordinates: 42.1981°N 87.9558°W
- Owner: Metra
- Line: Canadian National Waukesha Subdivision
- Platforms: 2 side platforms
- Tracks: 2

Construction
- Accessible: Yes

Other information
- Fare zone: 4

History
- Opened: August 19, 1996

Passengers
- 2018: 415 (average weekday) ▲7%
- Rank: 113 out of 236

Services
Preceding station	Metra	Following station
Vernon Hills toward Antioch	North Central Service	Buffalo Grove toward Union Station
Former services
Preceding station	Soo Line	Following station
Leithton toward Portal	Main Line	Wheeling toward Chicago
Track layout
Location

Prairie View station is on Metra's North Central Service in the unincorporated area of Prairie View, Illinois, near Buffalo Grove. The station is 34.4 miles (55.4 km) away from Chicago Union Station, the southern terminus of the line. In Metra's zone-based fare system, Prairie View is in zone 4. As of 2018, Prairie View is the 113th busiest of Metra's 236 non-downtown stations, with an average of 415 weekday boardings.

As of February 15, 2024, Prairie View is served by all 14 trains (seven in each direction) on weekdays.

There is student parking for Stevenson High School at the station, as the school is in walking distance.
