= Wheeling station (Illinois) =

Commuter rail station in Wheeling, Illinois

Wheeling

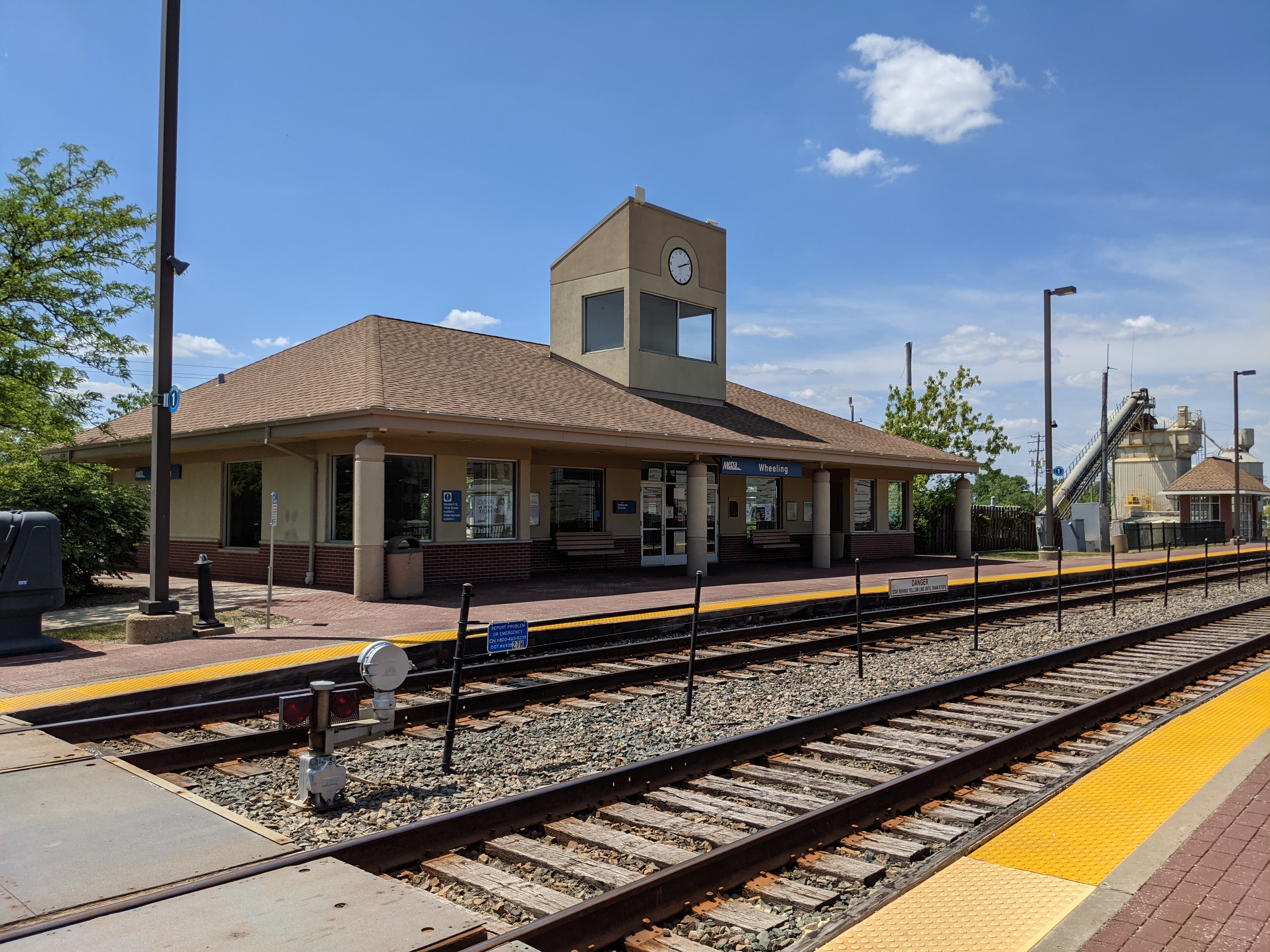
- Wheeling station in June 2021

General information
- Location: 400 Town Street; Wheeling, Illinois
- Coordinates: 42.1365°N 87.9274°W
- Line: CN Waukesha Subdivision
- Platforms: 2 side platforms
- Tracks: 2
- Connections: Pace Buses

Construction
- Accessible: Yes

Other information
- Fare zone: 3

History
- Opened: August 19, 1996

Passengers
- 2018: 348 (average weekday) ▼1.4%
- Rank: 134 out of 236

Services
Preceding station	Metra	Following station
Buffalo Grove toward Antioch	North Central Service	Prospect Heights toward Union Station
Former services
Preceding station	Soo Line	Following station
Prairie View toward Portal	Main Line	Des Plaines toward Chicago
Track layout
Location

Wheeling is a station on Metra's North Central Service in Wheeling, Illinois. The station is 29.9 miles (48.1 km) away from Chicago Union Station, the southern terminus of the line. In Metra's zone-based fare system, Wheeling is in zone 3. As of 2018, Wheeling is the 134th busiest of Metra's 236 non-downtown stations, with an average of 348 weekday boardings.

As of February 15, 2024, Wheeling is served by all 14 trains (seven in each direction) on weekdays.

The station is located in an industrial development. Town Street ends at Wheeling station as a cul-de-sac with parking in the middle of the U-Turn. Additional parking can be found on the opposite side of the intersection of Town Street and Wheeling Road, and across the tracks on Northgate Parkway south of Illinois Route 68.

== Bus connections ==
Pace

- 234 Wheeling/Des Plaines (weekdays only)
