= Belmont Avenue/Franklin Park station =

Commuter rail station in Franklin Park, Illinois

Franklin Park

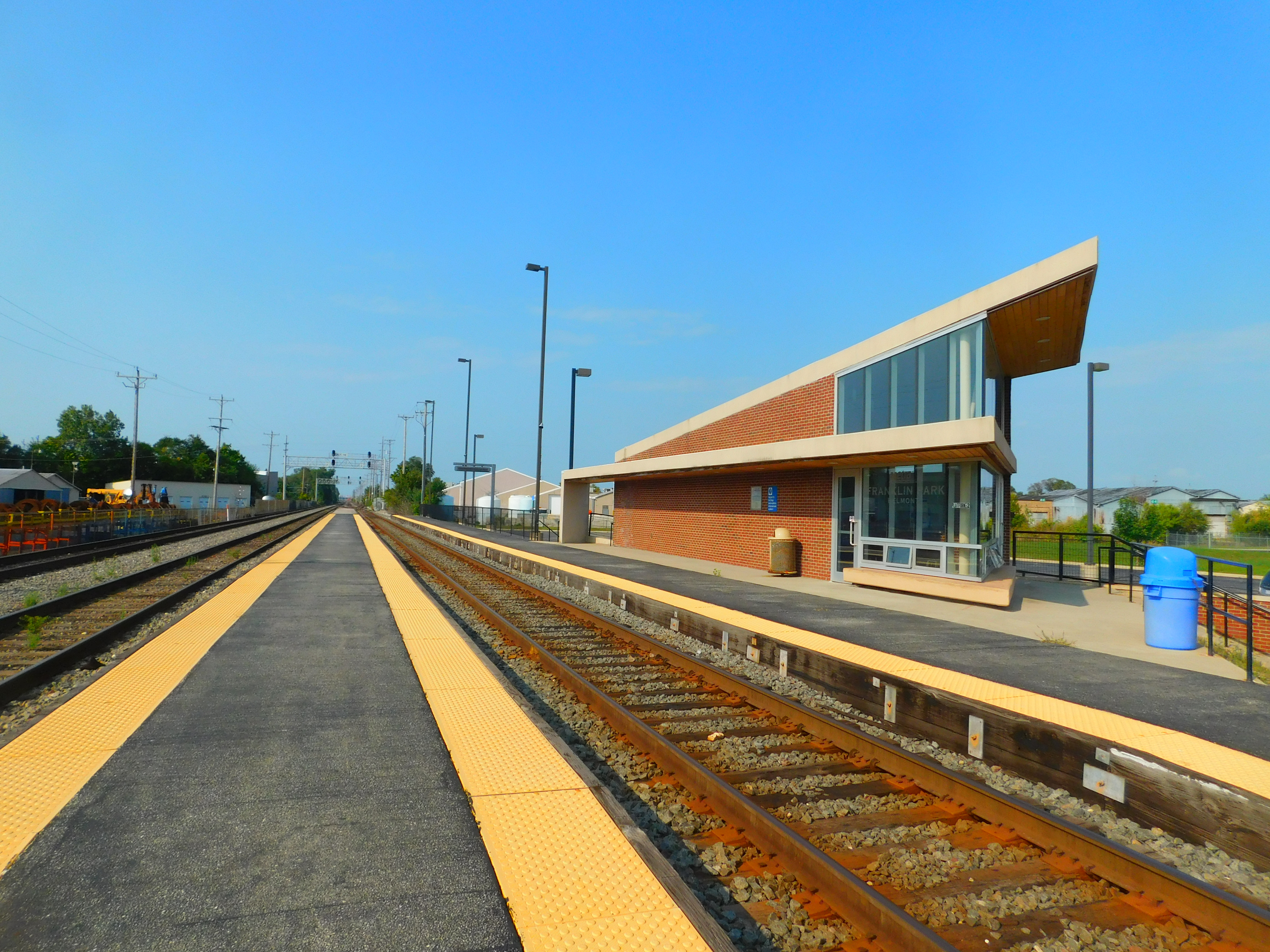
- Belmont Avenue/Franklin Park station in September 2016. The depot is visible on the right.

General information
- Location: 9280 Belmont Avenue; Franklin Park, Illinois
- Coordinates: 41.9386°N 87.8602°W
- Owner: Village of Franklin Park
- Line: CN Waukesha Subdivision
- Platforms: 1 side platform, 1 island platform
- Tracks: 3
- Connections: Pace Buses

Construction
- Accessible: Yes

Other information
- Fare zone: 2

History
- Opened: January 30, 2006

Passengers
- 2018: 24 (average weekday) ▼25%
- Rank: 224 out of 236

Services
Preceding station	Metra	Following station
Schiller Park toward Antioch	North Central Service	River Grove toward Union Station
Former services
Preceding station	Soo Line	Following station
Schiller Park toward Portal	Main Line	River Forest toward Chicago
Track layout
Location

Belmont Avenue/Franklin Park is a station on Metra's North Central Service in Franklin Park, Illinois. The station is 15.8 miles (25.4 km) away from Chicago Union Station, the southern terminus of the line. In Metra's zone-based fare system, Belmont Avenue/Franklin Park is in zone 2. As of 2018, Belmont Avenue/Franklin Park is the 224th busiest of Metra's 236 non-downtown stations, with an average of 24 weekday boardings. Belmont Avenue/Franklin Park was opened on January 30, 2006, along with three other new stations on the North Central Service.

As of February 15, 2024, Belmont Avenue/Franklin Park is served by 12 trains (six in each direction) on weekdays.

== Bus connections ==
Pace

- 319 Grand Avenue
