= Mundelein station =

Commuter rail station in Mundelein, Illinois

Mundelein

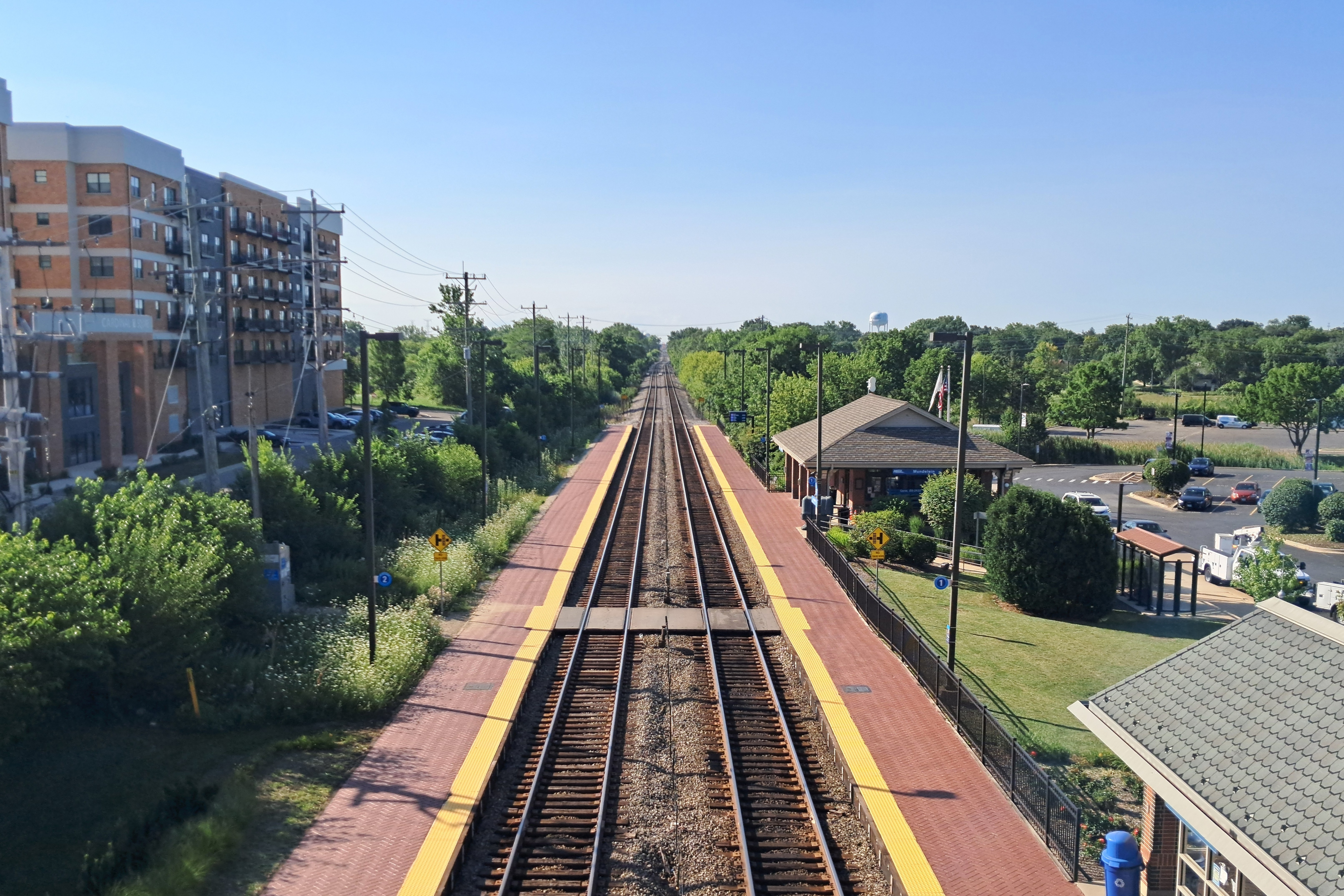
- Mundelein station in July 2026

General information
- Location: 205 North Archer Avenue; Mundelein, Illinois
- Coordinates: 42.2668°N 87.9980°W
- Owner: Metra
- Line: CN Waukesha Subdivision
- Platforms: 2 side platforms
- Tracks: 2
- Connections: Pace Suburban Bus

Construction
- Accessible: Yes

Other information
- Fare zone: 4

History
- Opened: August 19, 1996

Passengers
- 2018: 276 (average weekday) ▼0.4%
- Rank: 148 out of 236

Services
Preceding station	Metra	Following station
Prairie Crossing toward Antioch	North Central Service	Vernon Hills toward Union Station
Former services
Preceding station	Soo Line	Following station
Prairie Crossing toward Portal	Main Line	Leithton toward Chicago
Track layout
Location

Mundelein is a station on Metra's North Central Service in Mundelein, Illinois. The station is 39.6 miles (63.7 km) away from Chicago Union Station, the southern terminus of the line. In Metra's zone-based fare system, Mundelein is in zone 4. As of 2018, Mundelein is the 148th busiest of Metra's 236 non-downtown stations, with an average of 276 weekday boardings. Service began on August 19, 1996, but the building was not completed until 1997. The parking lot was expanded later. As with other North Central stations, there is no ticket agent and no weekend service to this station. In addition to train service, it is used for parking for Carmel High School "Street Scenes," and for occasional electronic waste disposal events.

As of February 15, 2024, Mundelein is served by all 14 trains (seven in each direction) on weekdays.

== Bus connections ==
Pace

- 572 Washington
- 574 CLC/Hawthorn Mall
