= Mundelein =

Mundelein may refer to:

- George Mundelein, cardinal archbishop of the Roman Catholic diocese of Chicago, Illinois
- Mundelein, Illinois, a village in suburban Chicago named for George Cardinal Mundelein
  - Mundelein station, a commuter rail station in Mundelein, Illinois
- Mundelein College, a Roman Catholic college for women, located in Chicago
- Mundelein Seminary, a Roman Catholic seminary, officially known as the University of Saint Mary of the Lake
- Mundelein High School, a high school in Mundelein, Illinois
