= Schiller Park station =

Commuter rail station in Schiller Park, Illinois

Schiller Park

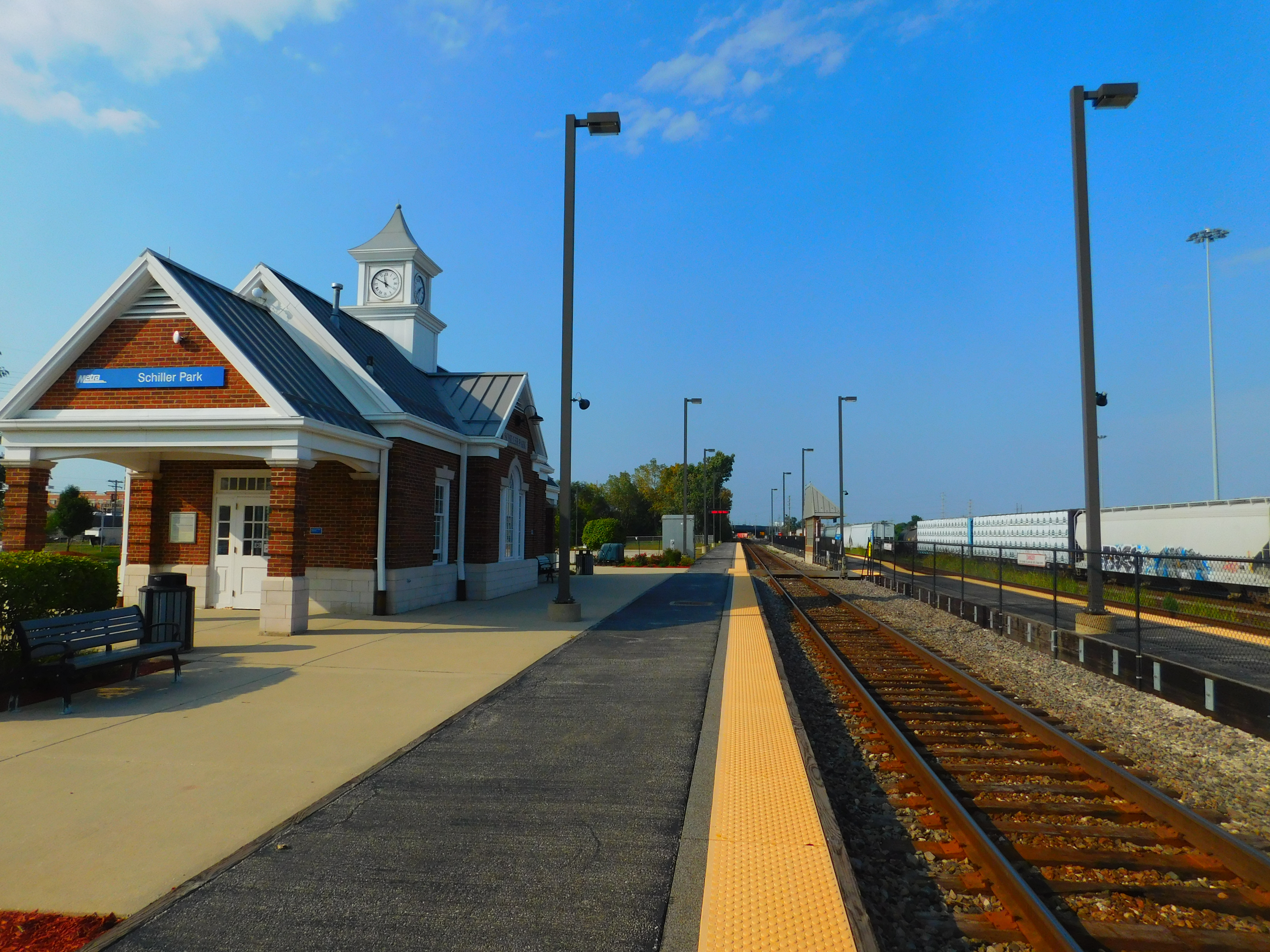
- Schiller Park station in September 2016

General information
- Location: 4555 Ruby Street; Schiller Park, Illinois 60176
- Coordinates: 41.9623°N 87.8704°W
- Owner: Metra
- Line: CN Waukesha Subdivision
- Platforms: 1 side platform, 1 island platform
- Tracks: 2

Construction
- Accessible: Yes

Other information
- Fare zone: 2

History
- Opened: January 30, 2006

Passengers
- 2018: 41 (average weekday) ▲13.9%
- Rank: 214 out of 236

Services
| Preceding station | Metra | Following station |
|---|---|---|
| Rosemont toward Antioch | North Central Service | Belmont Avenue toward Union Station |
Former services
| Preceding station | Soo Line | Following station |
|---|---|---|
| Orchard Park toward Portal | Main Line | Franklin Park toward Chicago |
| Orchard Park toward Superior | Main Line (1963–1965) | Chicago–Central Terminus |
Track layout
Location

Schiller Park is a station on Metra's North Central Service in Schiller Park, Illinois. The station is 17.4 miles (28.0 km) away from Chicago Union Station, the southern terminus of the line. In Metra's zone-based fare system, Schiller Park is in zone 2. As of 2018, Schiller Park is the 214th busiest of Metra's 236 non-downtown stations, with an average of 41 weekday boardings. Schiller Park was opened on January 30, 2006, along with three other new stations on the North Central Service.

As of February 15, 2024, Schiller Park is served by 12 trains (six in each direction) on weekdays.
