= Rosemont station (Metra) =

Commuter rail station in Rosemont, Illinois

Rosemont

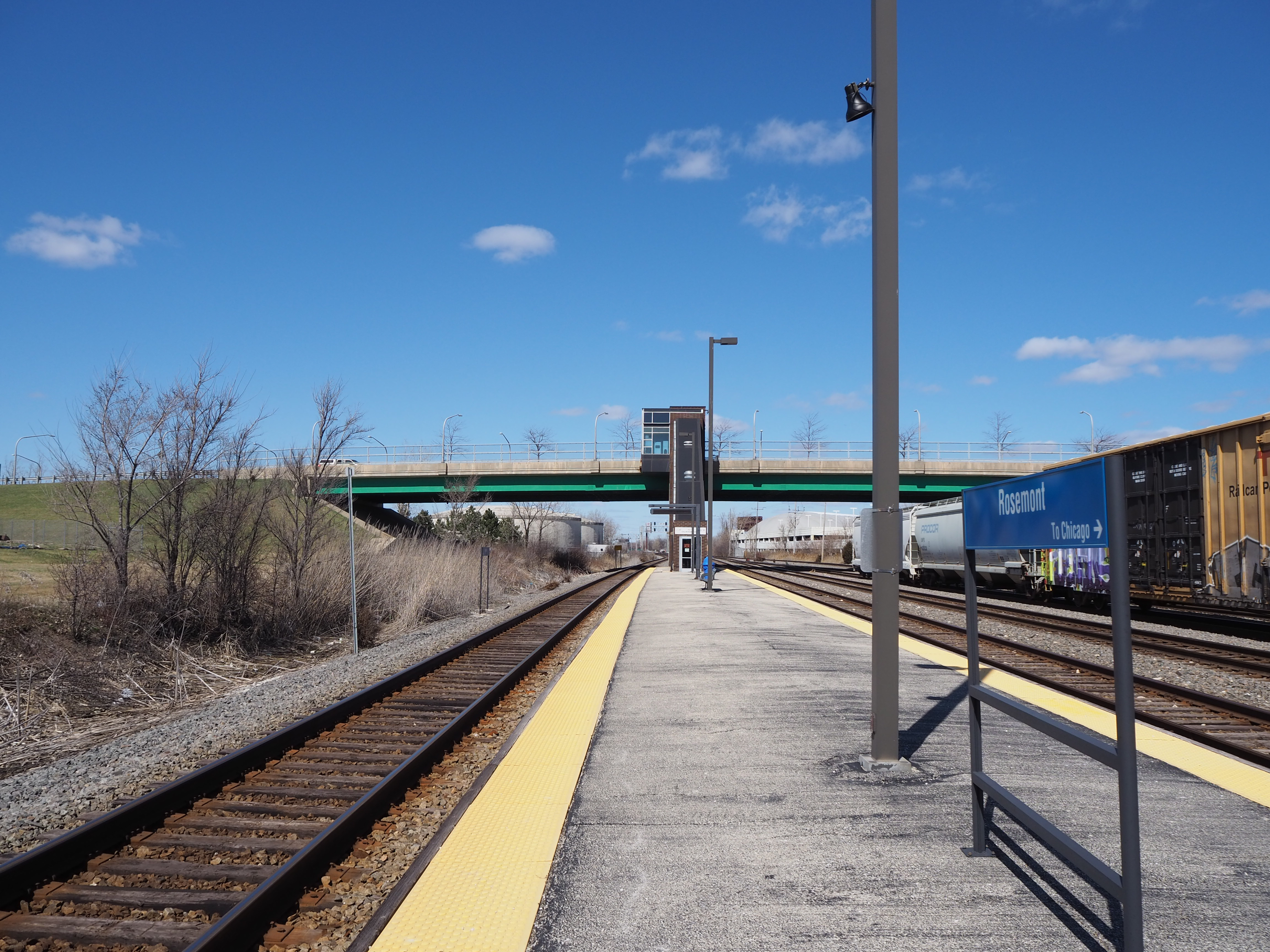

General information
- Location: 10005 Balmoral Avenue; Rosemont, Illinois 60018
- Coordinates: 41.9759°N 87.8738°W
- Owner: Metra
- Line: CN Waukesha Subdivision
- Platforms: 1 island platform
- Tracks: 2
- Connections: Pace Bus

Construction
- Parking: Yes
- Accessible: Yes

Other information
- Fare zone: 2

History
- Opened: January 30, 2006

Passengers
- 2018: 27 (average weekday) ▼22.9%
- Rank: 222 out of 236

Services
Preceding station	Metra	Following station
O'Hare Transfer toward Antioch	North Central Service	Schiller Park toward Union Station
Track layout
Location

Rosemont is a station on Metra's North Central Service in Rosemont, Illinois. The station is 18.6 miles (29.9 km) away from Chicago Union Station, the southern terminus of the line. In Metra's zone-based fare system, Rosemont is in zone 2. As of 2018, Rosemont is the 222nd busiest of Metra's 236 non-downtown stations, with an average of 27 weekday boardings. Rosemont was opened on January 30, 2006, along with three other new stations on the North Central Service.

As of February 15, 2024, Rosemont is served by 12 trains (six in each direction) on weekdays.

The station was built into the Balmoral Avenue bridge over the tracks. Parking is available on an embankment at the west end of Berwyn Avenue via Pearl Street.

== Bus Connections ==
Pace

- 330 Mannheim – LaGrange Roads
