= Elmwood Park station =

Commuter rail station in Illinois

Elmwood Park

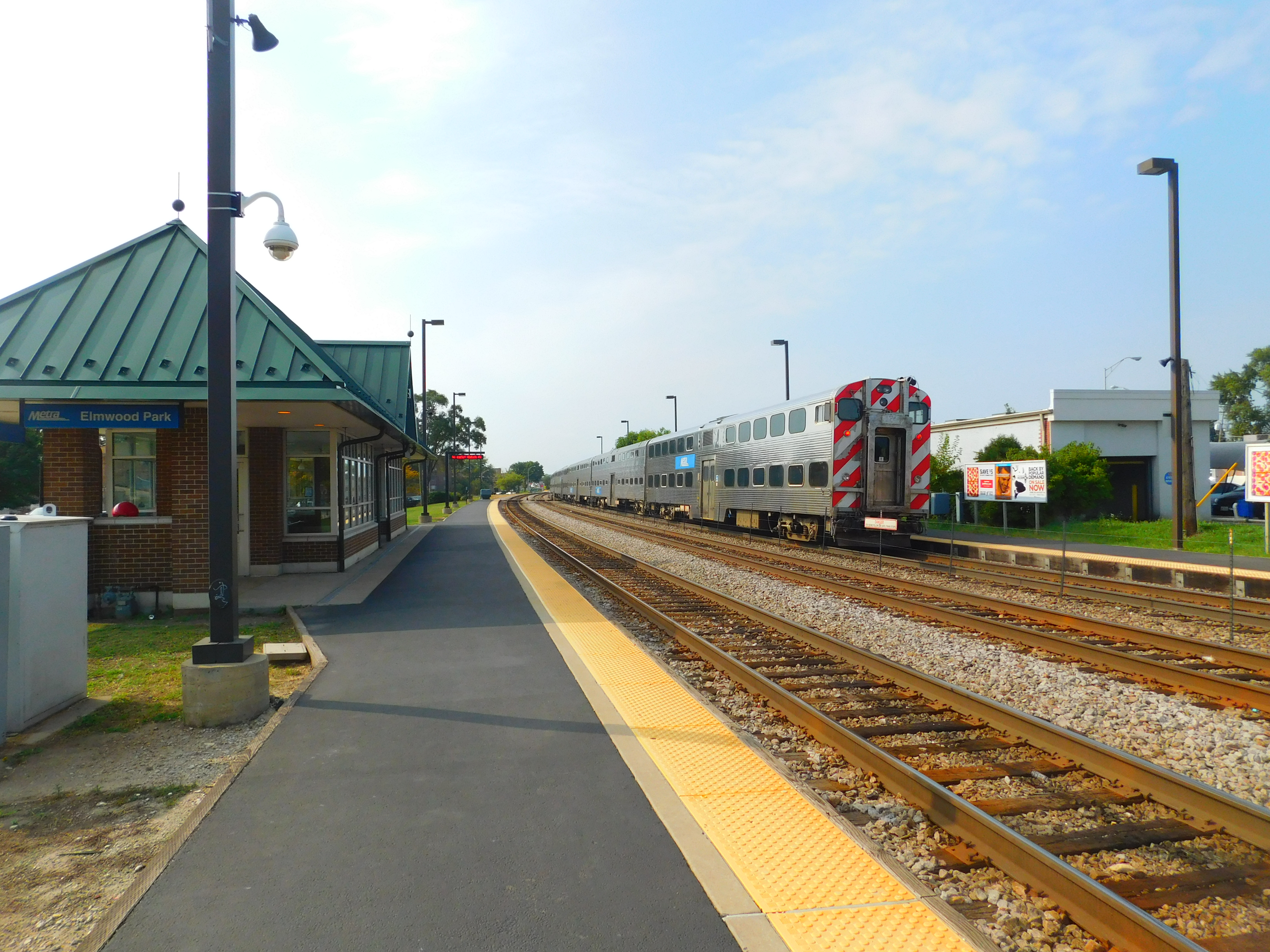
- Elmwood Park station in September 2016

General information
- Location: 7600 West Grand Avenue; Elmwood Park, Illinois 60707
- Coordinates: 41.9248°N 87.8148°W
- Owner: Metra
- Line: Elgin Subdivision
- Platforms: 2 side platforms
- Tracks: 3
- Connections: Pace Buses

Construction
- Parking: Yes
- Accessible: Yes

Other information
- Fare zone: 2

History
- Opened: 1916
- Rebuilt: 1956, 2001

Passengers
- 2018: 388 (average weekday) ▼4.2%
- Rank: 124 out of 236

Services
Preceding station	Metra	Following station
River Grove toward Big Timber/Elgin	Milwaukee District West	Mont Clare toward Union Station
North Central Service does not stop here
Former services
Preceding station	Milwaukee Road	Following station
River Grove toward Elgin	Suburban Service West Line	Mont Clare toward Chicago
Track layout
Location

Elmwood Park is a station on Metra's Milwaukee District West Line in Elmwood Park, Illinois. The station is 10.2 miles (16.4 km) away from Chicago Union Station, the eastern terminus of the line. In Metra's zone-based fare system, Elmwood Park is in zone 2. As of 2018, Elmwood Park is the 124th busiest of Metra's 236 non-downtown stations, with an average of 388 weekday boardings.

As of February 15, 2024, Elmwood Park is served by 41 trains (20 inbound, 21 outbound) on weekdays, by all 24 trains (12 in each direction) on Saturdays, and by all 18 trains (nine in each direction) on Sundays and holidays.

Elmwood Park station consists of three tracks and two side platforms. The middle track has no platform, so stopping trains must use the outer tracks. Metra's North Central Service trains use the tracks but do not stop.

Elmwood Park has built a kiss-and-ride drop off station on Grand Avenue. This allows cars to pull into the driveway and quickly drop off others safely. This is part of their plan to reconstruct Grand Avenue.

== Railroad crossing ==
Metra train crosses Grand Avenue at an oblique railroad crossing.

Just west of the station is the Grand Avenue railroad crossing, which is the longest grade crossing in the Chicago area. The crossing is 366 feet (112 m) long and intersects Grand Avenue at a 10 degree angle. It is so long and at such an acute angle that drivers need to use extra caution when crossing the tracks. It is used by both Metra and CPKC trains.

=== Train crash ===
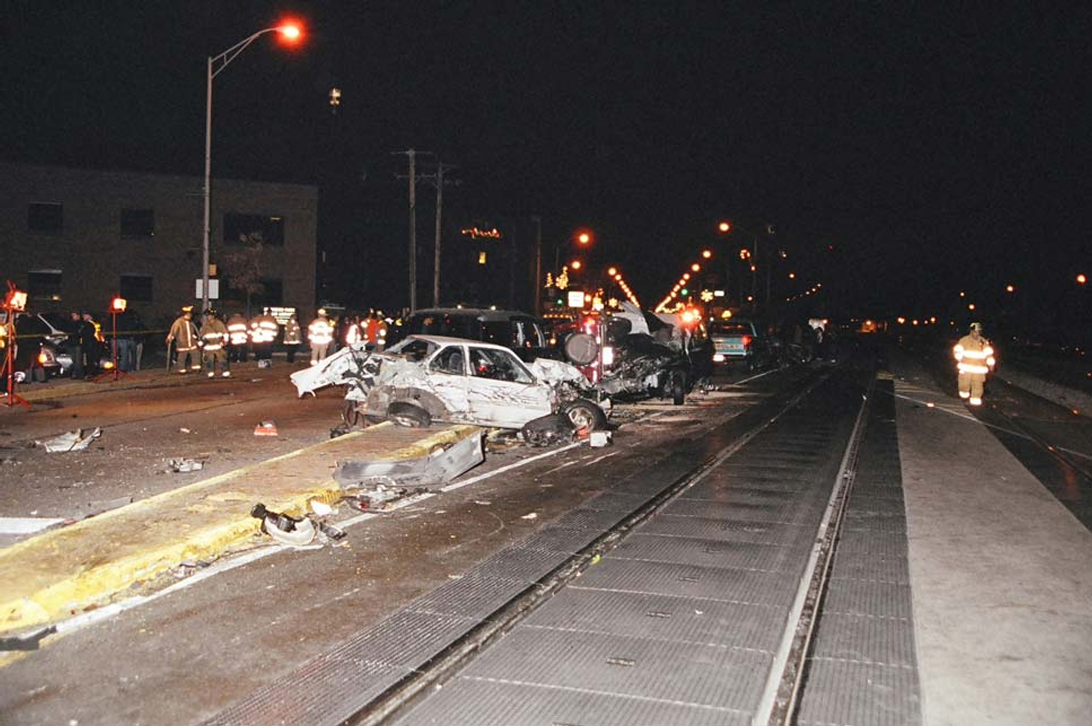
Crash site at the railroad crossing

On November 23, 2005, the railroad crossing was the site of a collision between North Central Service train No. 107, which traveled at 70 miles per hour (110 km/h), and six cars that were stuck in traffic on the crossing. Nobody was killed, but several people were injured. As a result of the accident, the maximum speed trains were allowed to travel through the area was reduced from 70 miles per hour (110 km/h) to 30 miles per hour (48 km/h), and the crossing was outfitted with additional warning signage.

=== Proposed grade separation ===
On June 10, 2008, nearly three years after the collision in November 2005, the National Transportation Safety Board published an accident report on the railroad crossing. The brief recommended that the railroad crossing be grade separated to prevent further crashes at the site. However, grade separation would cost $100 million, which was deemed too costly at the time.

Planning for grade separating the crossing began in March 2020 under the Grand Gateway Project.

On April 6, 2021, the Illinois Commerce Commission (ICC) granted $24 million to Elmwood Park to fund the grade separation project, which proposed moving Grand Avenue below the tracks. The ICC later granted an extra $3.1 million that same year in December. On February 15, 2025, the project received $13 million in federal funding.

== Bus connections ==
Pace

- Route 319 – Grand Avenue (Monday-Saturday Only)
