= Pace Pulse =

Bus system in greater Chicago

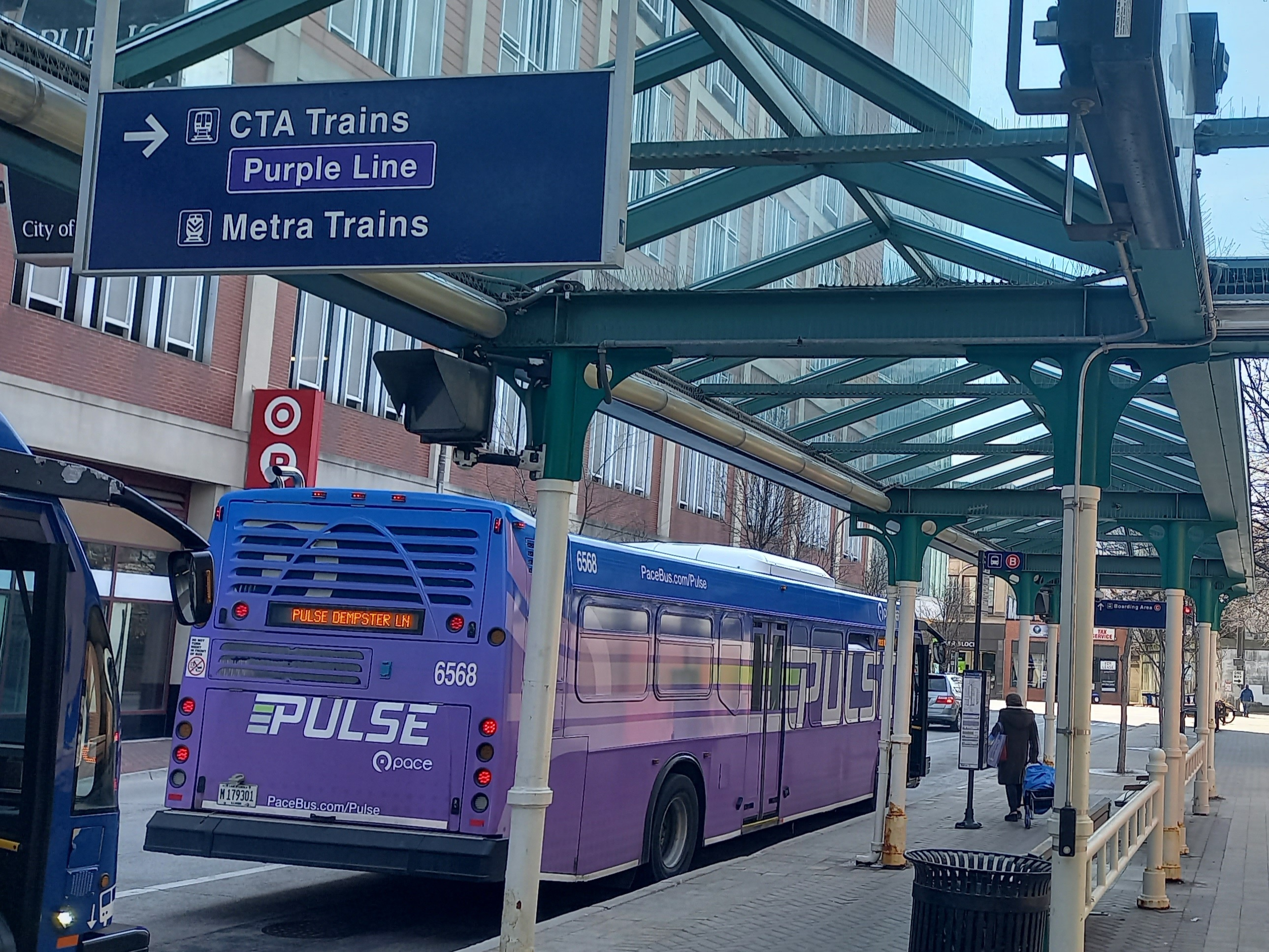
- Pulse Dempster bus at Davis CTA/Metra bus station in Evanston.

Overview
- System: Pace bus system
- Operator: Pace
- Garage: Northwest
- Began service: August 11, 2019

Route
- Route type: Express bus service Bus rapid transit (Note: Although Pace promotes its Pulse service as a "rapid transit service," it is missing several key features that a typical BRT system would have, such as dedicated bus lanes. See BRT Standard.)
- Locale: Chicago metropolitan area
- Communities served: Milwaukee: Chicago (Jefferson Park, Norwood Park), Niles; Dempster: Chicago (O'Hare), Rosemont, Des Plaines, Park Ridge, Niles, Morton Grove, Skokie, Evanston
- Start: Milwaukee: Jefferson Park; Dempster: O'Hare (Multi-Modal Facility)
- End: Milwaukee: Golf Mill; Dempster: Davis CTA/Metra
- Stations: Milwaukee: 10; Dempster: 17

Pulse is an express bus service and bus rapid transit system operated by Pace, a bus and paratransit agency in the Chicago metropolitan area.

== History ==
A system of express bus services operated by Pace was proposed as far back as 2014. One line was to run along Milwaukee Avenue from the Jefferson Park Transit Center, serving the Blue Line and the Union Pacific Northwest Line, to the Golf Mill Shopping Center. Despite delays, the Pulse Milwaukee Line opened on August 11, 2019.

Another express bus service was planned to run from O'Hare Airport to Evanston mostly via Dempster Street. The Dempster Line opened on August 13, 2023, at a cost of $10 million; however, buses only ran on Sundays. Services on the Dempster Line began running daily on October 29, 2023.

== Services ==
=== Milwaukee Line ===
Milwaukee Line highlighted in purple

The Milwaukee Line (internally designated as route 100) entirely runs along Pace bus route 270 from the Jefferson Park Transit Center to the Golf Mill Shopping Center. The line primarily travels along Milwaukee Avenue.

==== Stations ====
The entire route is in Cook County, Illinois.

Location	Station	Connections and notes (Note: The notes column does not include the Pulse line's parallel, local service except in terminal stations. Parallel, local service is highlighted in bold.)
Chicago	Jefferson Park	Chicago "L": Blue; Metra: Union Pacific Northwest; CTA buses: 56 68 81 81W 85 85A 88 91 92; Pace: 225, 226, 270
Chicago	Central	CTA buses: 68 85 85A; Pace: 225, 226
Chicago	Austin/Ardmore	
Chicago	Devon	CTA bus: 86
Niles	Touhy	Pace: 290, 411
Chicago–Niles	Harlem/Birchwood	Pace: 410, 411, 423
Niles	Oakton	Pace: 226, 410, 411
Niles	Main	Pace: 410
Niles	Dempster	Pace Pulse: ■ Dempster Line; Pace: 250, 410
Niles	Golf Mill	Pace: 208, 240, 241, 270, 272, 410, 411, 412

=== Dempster Line ===
Dempster Line highlighted in purple

The Dempster Line (internally designated as 101) entirely runs along Pace bus route 250 from O'Hare Multi-Modal Facility, which directly connects to O'Hare International Airport via the Airport Transit System, to a station hub on Davis Street in Evanston. The majority of the line travels along Dempster Street.

==== Stations ====
The entire route is in Cook County, Illinois.

Location	Station	Connections and notes
Chicago	O'Hare	ATS to O'Hare Airport; Metra: North Central Service (O'Hare Transfer); Pace: 250, 330
Rosemont–Des Plaines	Higgins	Pace: 223W, 223E
Des Plaines	Lee/Touhy	Pace: 221
Des Plaines	Oakton	Pace: 226
Des Plaines	Des Plaines Metra	Metra: Union Pacific Northwest; Pace: 208, 209, 226, 230, 234
Des Plaines–Park Ridge	Dee	
Park Ridge–Niles	Western	Pace: 241, 411
Niles	Cumberland	
Niles	Milwaukee	Pace Pulse: ■ Milwaukee Line; Pace: 270, 410
Niles–Morton Grove	Harlem	Pace: 410, 423
Morton Grove	Waukegan	Pace: 210
Morton Grove	Austin	
Skokie	Dempster–Skokie CTA	Chicago "L": Yellow; CTA buses: 54A 97; Pace: 626
Skokie	Crawford	Pace: 215
Skokie	St. Louis	
Evanston	Dodge	CTA buses: 93 206
Evanston	Davis CTA/Metra	Chicago "L": Purple (Davis); Metra: Union Pacific North (Davis Street/Evanston); CTA buses: 93 201 206; Pace: 208, 213, 250

== Future ==
Pace is planning to add several addditional Pulse lines. Some of the lines actively being developed include lines along Halsted Street, 95th Street, Cermak Road/22nd Street, and Harlem Avenue.

The 95th Street Line will run from the Moraine Valley Community College to 95th/Dan Ryan station on the Red Line. The Halsted Street Line will run from Harvey station on the Metra Electric District line to the same Red Line station that the 95th Street Line will end. The Cermak/22nd Street Line will run from Yorktown Center to 54th/Cermak station on the Pink Line. The Harlem Line will run from Harlem/Lake station on the Green Line to the Pace Southwest Division facility.
