= Mont Clare station (Illinois) =

Commuter rail station in Chicago, Illinois

Mont Clare

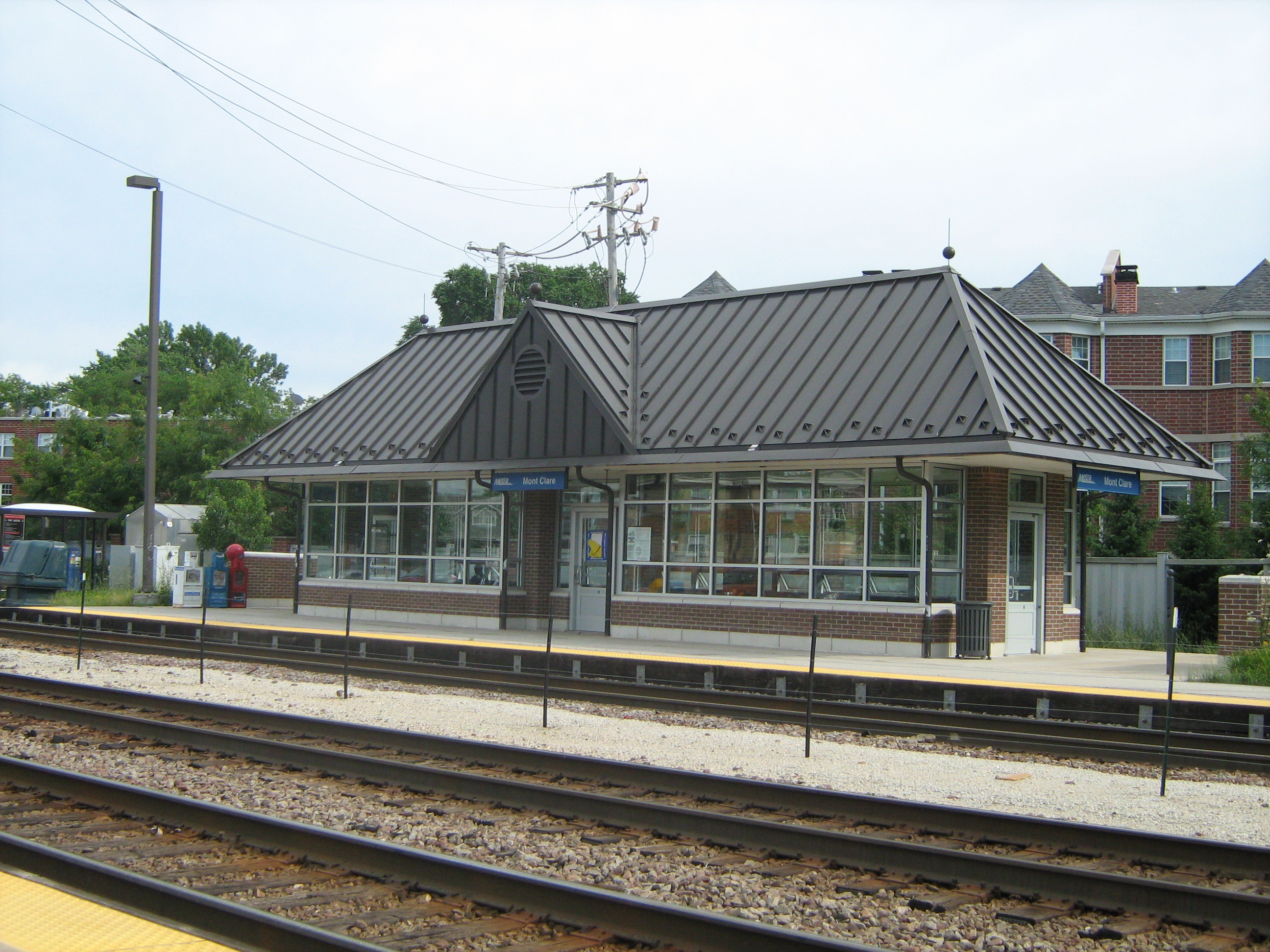
- Mont Clare station in July 2009

General information
- Location: 7007 West Medill Avenue; Chicago, Illinois 60707
- Coordinates: 41.9217°N 87.8017°W
- Line: Elgin Subdivision
- Platforms: 2 side platforms
- Tracks: 3
- Connections: CTA Buses

Construction
- Parking: Yes
- Accessible: Yes

Other information
- Fare zone: 2

History
- Opened: 1956
- Rebuilt: 2001

Passengers
- 2018: 303 (average weekday) ▼9.6%
- Rank: 145 out of 236

Services
Preceding station	Metra	Following station
Elmwood Park toward Big Timber/Elgin	Milwaukee District West	Mars Weekday Limited toward Union Station
North Central Service does not stop here
Former services
Preceding station	Milwaukee Road	Following station
Elmwood Park toward Elgin	Suburban Service West Line	Mars toward Chicago
Track layout
Location

Mont Clare is a station on Metra's Milwaukee District West Line in the Montclare community area in Chicago, Illinois. The station is 9.5 miles (15.3 km) away from Chicago Union Station, the eastern terminus of the line. In Metra's zone-based fare system, Mont Clare is in zone 2. As of 2018, Mont Clare is the 145th busiest of Metra's 236 non-downtown stations, with an average of 303 weekday boardings. It is also the last outbound station in Chicago's city limits.

As of February 15, 2024, Mont Clare is served by 41 trains (20 inbound, 21 outbound) on weekdays, by all 24 trains (12 in each direction) on Saturdays, and by all 18 trains (nine in each direction) on Sundays and holidays.

Mont Clare station consists of three tracks and two side platforms. The middle track has no platform, so stopping trains must use the outer tracks. Metra's North Central Service trains use these tracks but do not stop.

== Bus connections ==
CTA

- 65 Grand
- 74 Fullerton
- 90 Harlem

Pace

- 307 Harlem
- 319 Grand Avenue
