= O'Hare Transfer station =

Commuter rail station in Chicago, Illinois

O'Hare Transfer

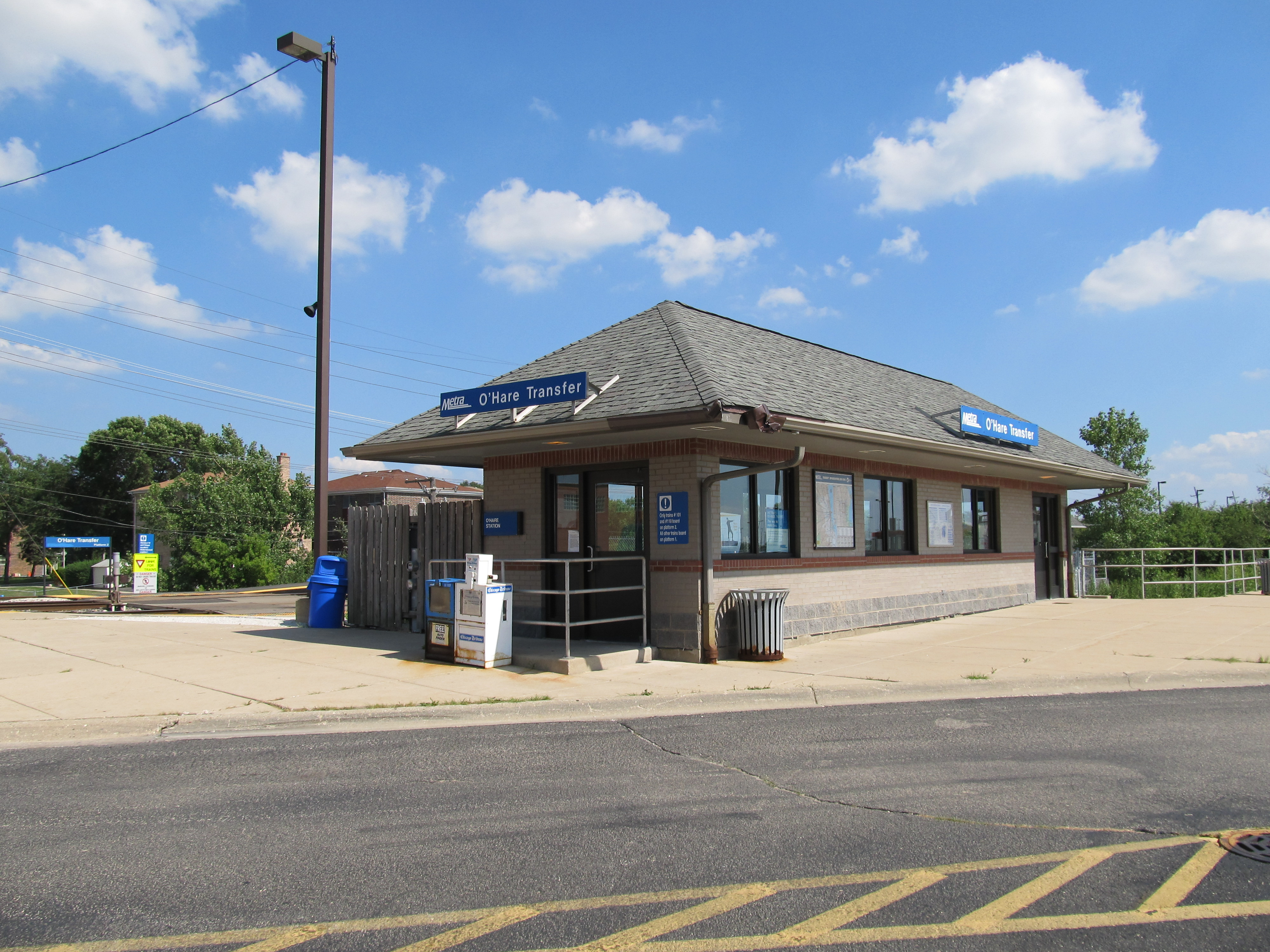

General information
- Location: 10300 W. Zemke Boulevard; Chicago, Illinois 60666
- Coordinates: 41.9950°N 87.8806°W
- Owner: City of Chicago
- Line: CN Waukesha Subdivision
- Platforms: 2 side platforms
- Tracks: 2
- Connections: ATS to O'Hare Airport; Pace buses

Construction
- Platform levels: 1
- Parking: No
- Accessible: Yes

Other information
- Fare zone: 2

History
- Opened: August 19, 1996

Passengers
- 2018: 113 (average weekday) ▼8.1%
- Rank: 183 out of 236

Services
Preceding station	Metra	Following station
Prospect Heights toward Antioch	North Central Service	Rosemont toward Union Station
Preceding station	Pace Pulse	Following station
Terminus	Dempster Line	Higgins toward Davis CTA
Track layout
Location

O'Hare Transfer is a commuter railroad station along Metra's North Central Service that serves Chicago's O'Hare International Airport. The station is 18.6 miles (29.9 km) away from Chicago Union Station, the southern terminus of the line. As of 2018, O'Hare Transfer is the 183rd busiest of Metra's 236 non-downtown stations, with an average of 113 weekday boardings. The station is located at the dead end of Zemke Boulevard east of Mannheim Road (US 12/US 45) outside the northeast corner of the airport's Multi-Modal Facility (rental car/parking lot).

The railroad station is connected to the Airport Transit System people mover at the O'Hare Multimodal Facility. Two Pace bus routes also stop curbside at the lower level of the ATS station. The free ride on the people mover provides a connection to all four of the airline terminals.

As of February 15, 2024, O'Hare Transfer is served by 12 trains (six in each direction) on weekdays.

Owing to the weekday only operation and limited frequency typically offered by the North Central Service, the station is not usually a significant means of access for travelers to O'Hare. All trains are scheduled to stop at the inside (westernmost) platform, but occasionally an announcement will be made over the public address system that a train will be stopping on the outside (easternmost) platform.

Metra offered an expanded schedule for the 2024 Democratic National Convention from August 12–30, 2024. On weekdays, in addition to regularly scheduled service, there were 15 hourly round trips between O'Hare Transfer and Union Station, with stops at River Grove and Western Avenue. On weekends, there were 16 hourly round trips serving the same stations, with no service north of O'Hare Transfer.

== Multi Modal Facility ==
The Multi Modal Facility (MMF) is an intermodal station serving the Airport Transit System, a people mover serving O'Hare Airport, and three Pace buses (including the Pulse Dempster Line); the station serves as the terminus of the ATS and the three Pace buses. It is located west of the O'Hare Transfer station at the other side of the parking garage and east of US 12/US 45 (Mannheim Road). The station opened on November 7, 2018; however, the ATS did not connect to the newly-opened station. The ATS was closed on January 8, 2019, to reconstruct the entire system as well as to extend the line to the facility. It was originally scheduled to reopen in fall 2019; however, the reopening date was delayed by two years due to contract disputes and later supply issues caused by the COVID-19 pandemic. The ATS reopened on November 3, 2021, under a limited schedule; the people mover returned to its full schedule on April 18, 2022. Since the reopening, the ATS connects to the MMF.

== Transit Connections ==
Airport Transit System

- To Terminals 1, 2, 3, and 5

CTA

- Blue Line at O'Hare (via Airport Transit System)

Pace

- 250 Dempster Street
- 330 Mannheim – LaGrange Roads
- Pulse Dempster Line
