= Schiller Park, Illinois =

- Village
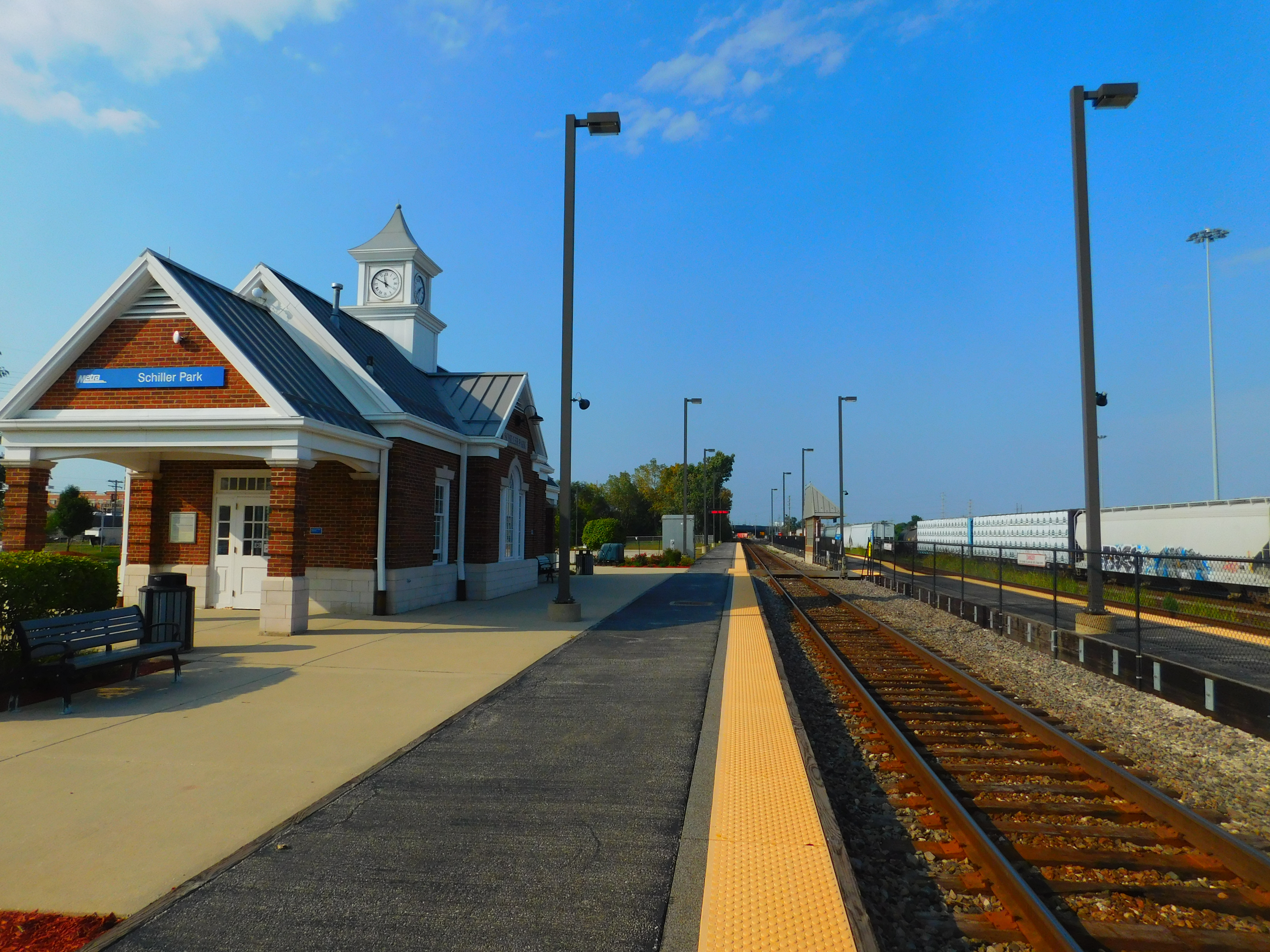
- Schiller Park station

- Seal
- Motto: "Small Town Feel With a World at Its Touch"
- Location of Schiller Park in Cook County, Illinois.

- Location within Greater Chicago Location within Illinois Location within the United States
- Coordinates: 41°57′22″N 87°52′14″W
- Country: United States
- State: Illinois
- County: Cook
- Township: Leyden

Area
  - Total: 2.77 sq mi (7.17 km^{2})
  - Land: 2.77 sq mi (7.17 km^{2})
  - Water: 0 sq mi (0.00 km^{2})

Population (2020)
  - Total: 11,709
  - Density: 4,228/sq mi (1,632.3/km^{2})
- Time zone: UTC-6 (CST)
  - Summer (DST): UTC-5 (CDT)
- ZIP Code(s): 60176
- Area codes: 847 & 224
- FIPS code: 17-68081
- Website: www.villageofschillerpark.com

Schiller Park is a village in Leyden Township, Cook County, Illinois, United States. The population was 11,709 at the 2020 census.

== Geography ==
According to the 2010 census, Schiller Park has a total area of 2.77 square miles (7.17 km^{2}), all land. Opposite of the village from Interstate 294 is O'Hare International Airport.

== Demographics ==
Historical population
Census	Pop.	Note	%±
1920	390		—
1930	709		81.8%
1940	804		13.4%
1950	1,384		72.1%
1960	5,687		310.9%
1970	12,712		123.5%
1980	11,458		−9.9%
1990	11,189		−2.3%
2000	11,850		5.9%
2010	11,793		−0.5%
2020	11,709		−0.7%
U.S. Decennial Census

=== Racial and ethnic composition ===
Schiller Park village, Illinois – Racial and ethnic composition Note: the US Census treats Hispanic/Latino as an ethnic category. This table excludes Latinos from the racial categories and assigns them to a separate category. Hispanics/Latinos may be of any race.
Race / Ethnicity (NH = Non-Hispanic)	Pop 2000	Pop 2010	Pop 2020	% 2000	% 2010	% 2020
White alone (NH)	8,169	7,935	6,892	68.94%	67.29%	58.86%
Black or African American alone (NH)	211	189	164	1.78%	1.60%	1.40%
Native American or Alaska Native alone (NH)	15	21	11	0.13%	0.18%	0.09%
Asian alone (NH)	598	691	803	5.05%	5.86%	6.86%
Pacific Islander alone (NH)	2	0	0	0.02%	0.00%	0.00%
Other race alone (NH)	22	23	22	0.19%	0.20%	0.19%
Mixed race or Multiracial (NH)	235	91	188	1.98%	0.77%	1.61%
Hispanic or Latino (any race)	2,598	2,843	3,629	21.92%	24.11%	30.99%
Total	11,850	11,793	11,709	100.00%	100.00%	100.00%

=== 2020 census ===
As of the 2020 census, Schiller Park had a population of 11,709 and 4,505 households. The village had 3,105 families, and the population density was 4,227.08 inhabitants per square mile (1,632.08/km^{2}). Housing unit density was 1,700.00 per square mile (656.37/km^{2}).

The median age was 39.2 years. 20.2% of residents were under the age of 18 and 14.1% were 65 years of age or older. For every 100 females there were 103.0 males, and for every 100 females age 18 and over there were 102.0 males.

100.0% of residents lived in urban areas, while 0.0% lived in rural areas.

Of the village's households, 30.2% had children under the age of 18 living in them. Of all households, 45.4% were married-couple households, 23.7% were households with a male householder and no spouse or partner present, and 24.3% were households with a female householder and no spouse or partner present. About 27.4% of all households were made up of individuals and 8.5% had someone living alone who was 65 years of age or older. 30.02% were non-families. The average household size was 3.13 and the average family size was 2.59.

There were 4,709 housing units, of which 4.3% were vacant. The homeowner vacancy rate was 1.0% and the rental vacancy rate was 4.5%.

=== Income and poverty ===
The median income for a household in the village was $58,637, and the median income for a family was $72,034. Males had a median income of $42,821 versus $35,103 for females. The per capita income for the village was $30,168. About 9.3% of families and 12.3% of the population were below the poverty line, including 26.3% of those under age 18 and 6.6% of those age 65 or over.

== Education ==
Schiller Park School District 81 operates public schools.

The Roman Catholic Archdiocese of Chicago operates Catholic schools. St. Maria Goretti School was in Schiller Park. From circa 2017 to 2020 the student population declined by 73. The archdiocese stated that the school could remain open if it had 150 students for 2019–2020, but the student population was below that. The archdiocese closed the school in June 2020.

== Transportation ==
The Schiller Park station provides Metra commuter rail service along the North Central Service Line. Trains travel east to Chicago Union Station, and north to Antioch station. Bus service in the village is provided by Pace.

== Sister cities ==
- Capurso (Italy), 1994

== Notable people ==
- Edward Bluthardt (1916–1993), Illinois state representative and lawyer; Bluthardt served as mayor of Schiller Park.

== See also ==
- Schiller Woods magic water pump
