= River Grove station =

Commuter rail station in River Grove, Illinois

River Grove

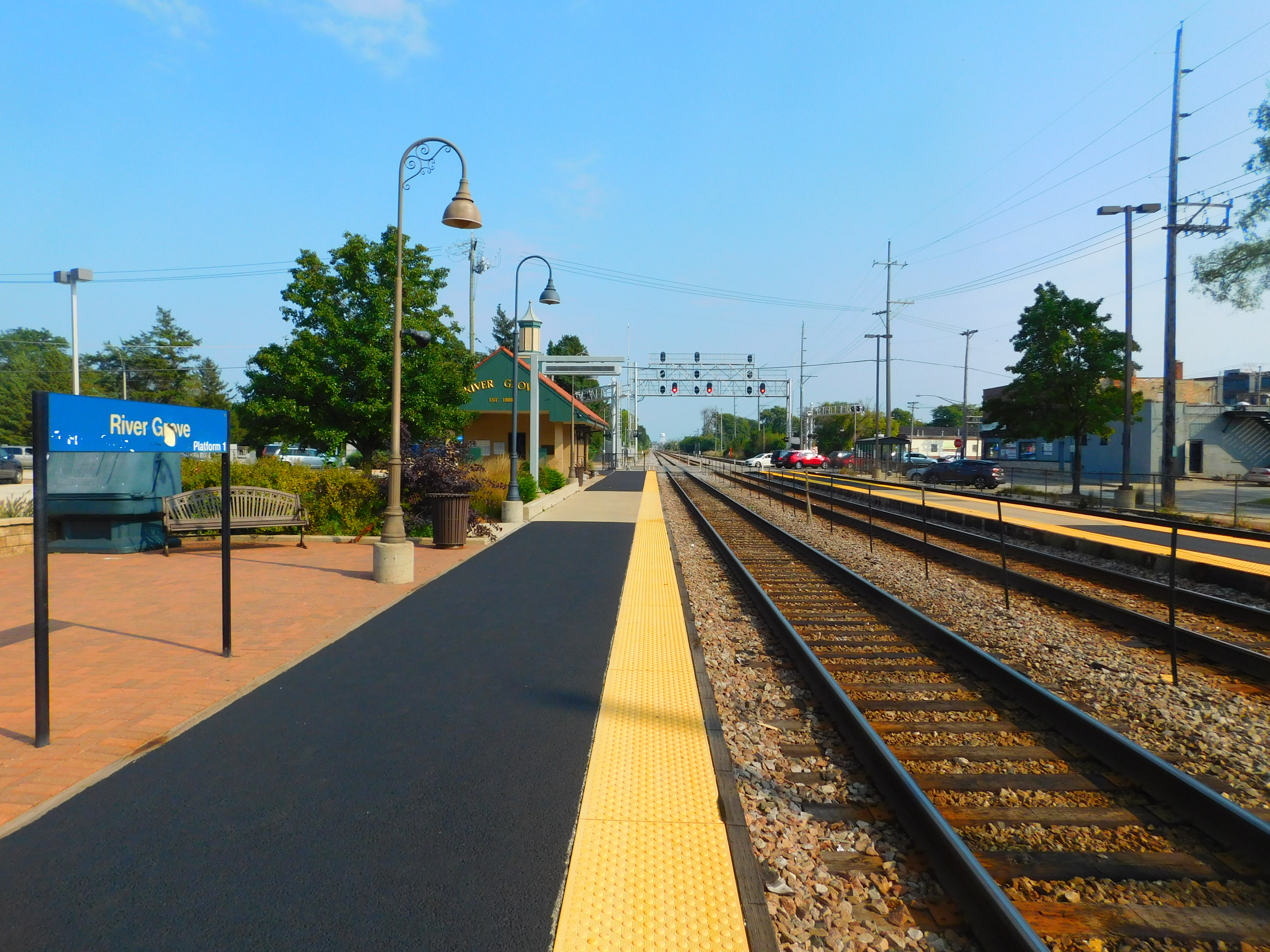
- River Grove station in September 2016

General information
- Location: 8421 Arnold Avenue; River Grove, Illinois 60171
- Coordinates: 41.9310°N 87.8362°W
- Owner: Metra
- Line: Elgin Subdivision
- Platforms: 1 side platform, 1 island platform
- Tracks: 3
- Connections: Pace bus

Construction
- Parking: Yes
- Accessible: Yes

Other information
- Fare zone: 2

History
- Opened: 1946

Passengers
- 2018: 333 (average weekday) ▲5.4%
- Rank: 138 out of 236

Services
Preceding station	Metra	Following station
Franklin Park toward Big Timber/Elgin	Milwaukee District West	Elmwood Park toward Union Station
Belmont Avenue toward Antioch	North Central Service	Western Avenue toward Union Station
Former services
Preceding station	Milwaukee Road	Following station
Franklin Park toward Elgin	Suburban Service West Line	Elmwood Park toward Chicago
Track layout
Location

River Grove is a station on Metra's North Central Service and Milwaukee District West Line in River Grove, Illinois. The station is 11.4 miles (18.3 km) away from Chicago Union Station, the southern terminus of the lines. In Metra's zone-based fare system, River Grove is in zone 2. As of 2018, River Grove is the 138th busiest of Metra's 236 non-downtown stations, with an average of 333 weekday boardings.

On the Milwaukee District West Line, as of February 15, 2024, River Grove is served by 41 trains (20 inbound, 21 outbound) on weekdays, by all 24 trains (12 in each direction) on Saturdays, and by all 18 trains (nine in each direction) on Sundays and holidays.

On the North Central Service, as of February 15, 2024, River Grove is served by 12 trains (six in each direction) on weekdays.

West of the station, the North Central Service diverges from the ex-Milwaukee Road's Chicago-Omaha-Kansas City mainline at the B-12 junction in Franklin Park, Illinois and proceeds north on the Canadian National Railway's Waukesha Subdivision, with the Milwaukee District West Line continuing to the west. Inbound North Central trains bypass the next six MD West stations, running nonstop to Western Avenue. The station is located across the tracks from Arnold Avenue on the corner of Illinois Route 171, and is surrounded by the local St. Joseph's Cemetery. It is also located across from Elmwood Cemetery.

== Bus connections ==
Pace

- "Route 319 – Grand Avenue". PaceBus.com. Chicago: Pace Suburban Bus Service. (Monday-Saturday only)
- "Route 331 – Cumberland/5th Avenue". PaceBus.com. Chicago: Pace Suburban Bus Service.
