= Antioch, Illinois =

- Village
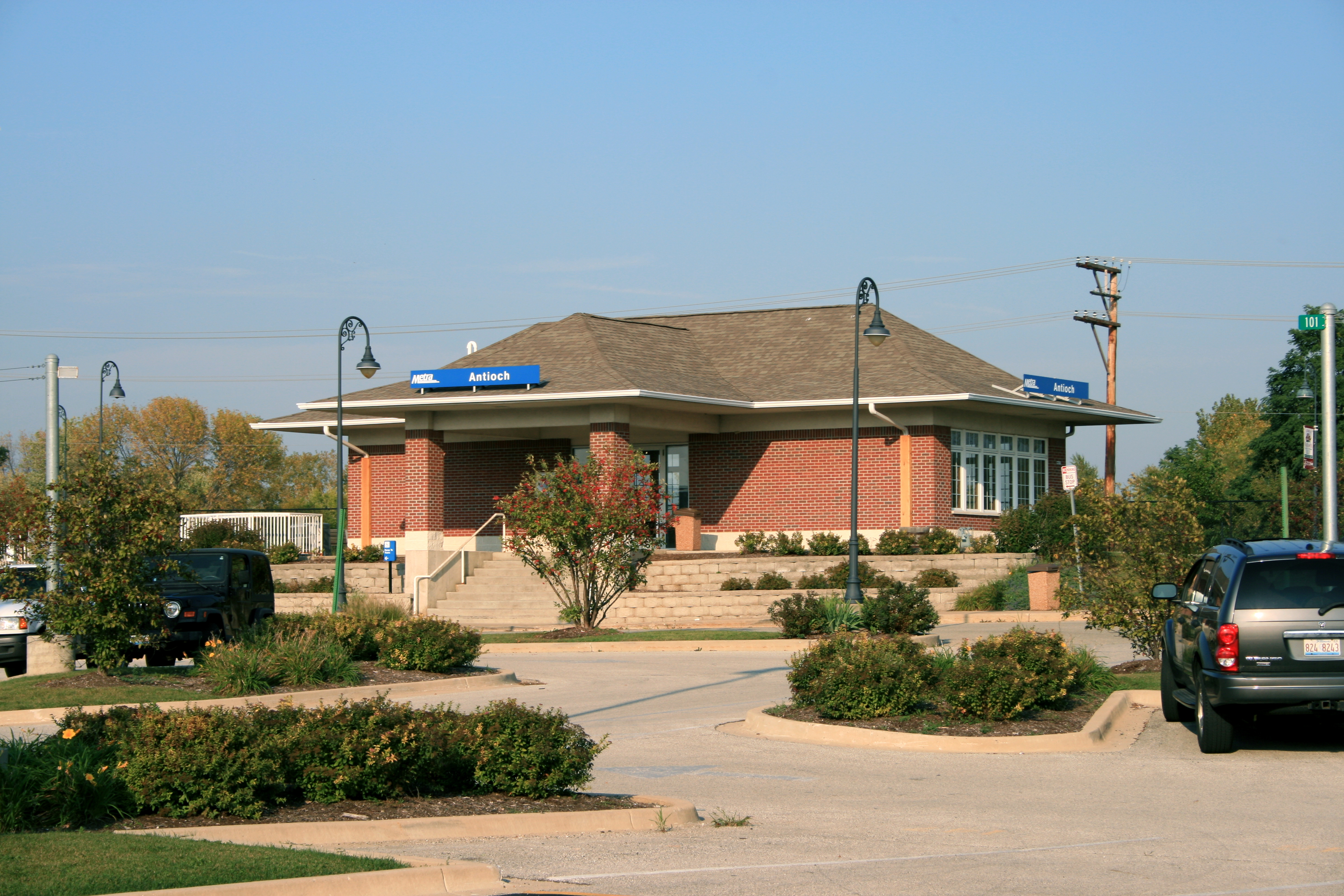
- Antioch Metra station

- Seal
- Nickname: "Gateway to the Chain O'Lakes"
- Motto: "Authentic by Nature"
- Interactive map of Antioch, Illinois
- Coordinates: 42°28′20″N 88°05′27″W
- Country: United States
- State: Illinois
- County: Lake
- Township: Antioch
- Settled: 1830s

Government
  - Mayor: Scott J. Gartner

Area
  - Total: 8.63 sq mi (22.35 km^{2})
  - Land: 8.24 sq mi (21.34 km^{2})
  - Water: 0.39 sq mi (1.01 km^{2})
- Elevation: 778 ft (237 m)

Population (2020)
  - Total: 14,622
  - Density: 1,774.3/sq mi (685.05/km^{2})
- Time zone: UTC-6 (CST)
  - Summer (DST): UTC-5 (CDT)
- ZIP code: 60002
- Area code(s): 847, 224
- FIPS code: 17-01595
- GNIS feature ID: 2397970
- Per capita income: $36,353 (2014)
- Home value: $218,800 (2014)
- Website: www.antioch.il.gov

Antioch is a village in Lake County, Illinois, United States. As of the 2020 census, the population was 14,622. The village is nestled into the Chain O'Lakes waterway system and borders the state of Wisconsin. Part of the Chicago metropolitan area, Antioch is located approximately halfway between the major cities of Chicago (60 miles south) and Milwaukee (50 miles north).

== History ==
=== Native American history ===
The Pottawatomi Tribe historically inhabited in the area of present-day Antioch prior to European settlement. The tribe was pushed to the west by European/American encroachment in the 1830s although remnants can still be found today.

=== European settlement ===
The first permanent European settlements in the region were along the creek, named as "Sequoit" which means "winding". Darius and Thomas Gage brothers built the first cabin. After building a sawmill by Hiram Buttrick on Sequoit Creek, a tributary of the Fox River, the region became a center of commerce. In 1843, new settlers gave a biblical name "Antioch" to the region and started a school. The town grew as new settlers, primarily of English and German descent, established farms and businesses. In 1976, a replica of Buttrick's mill was built a few hundred feet downstream from where it once stood. Today, many local businesses and organizations as well as Antioch Community High School use the name "Sequoit".

Partly due to being a regional center of the abolitionist movement, Antioch is noted as having sent a disproportionately high number of its young men to the Union Army. By the late 1800s, Antioch became a popular vacation spot for Chicagoans and tourism grew quickly once the rail line to Chicago was laid in 1886. Fire destroyed much of downtown in 1891, 1903, and 1904. During Prohibition, Al Capone owned a summer home on nearby Bluff Lake. Following World War II, Antioch continued to see a steady population and economic increase, and an industrial park was created in the 1970s.

Today, Antioch serves as a bedroom community within the Chicago metropolitan and Milwaukee metropolitan area.

== Geography ==
Antioch is approximately halfway between Chicago and Milwaukee.

According to the 2021 census gazetteer files, Antioch has a total area of 8.63 square miles (22.35 km^{2}), of which 8.24 square miles (21.34 km^{2}) (or 95.49%) is land and 0.39 square miles (1.01 km^{2}) (or 4.51%) is water.

The village lies in a gently rolling moraine landscape, dominated by lakes of glacial origin. Among these are the Antioch Lake, south of the village center, Lake Marie, west of the village center and the Redwing Slough Lake, east of the village center. There are several smaller lakes and ponds, and a complement of wetlands.

=== Climate ===
Like Chicago, Antioch lies in a humid continental climate zone and experiences four distinct seasons. Antioch receives an average of 36.74 inches (933 mm) of precipitation each year.

Climate data for Antioch, IL (1981-2010; extremes 1901–present)
Month	Jan	Feb	Mar	Apr	May	Jun	Jul	Aug	Sep	Oct	Nov	Dec	Year
Record high °F (°C)	63 (17)	70 (21)	86 (30)	90 (32)	94 (34)	100 (38)	105 (41)	104 (40)	102 (39)	89 (32)	78 (26)	68 (20)	105 (41)
Mean daily maximum °F (°C)	29.0 (−1.7)	33.0 (0.6)	43.8 (6.6)	57.1 (13.9)	68.1 (20.1)	78.0 (25.6)	82.1 (27.8)	80.6 (27.0)	73.3 (22.9)	60.9 (16.1)	46.8 (8.2)	33.1 (0.6)	57.2 (14.0)
Mean daily minimum °F (°C)	13.9 (−10.1)	17.3 (−8.2)	26.8 (−2.9)	37.5 (3.1)	47.4 (8.6)	57.4 (14.1)	62.5 (16.9)	61.3 (16.3)	53.4 (11.9)	41.0 (5.0)	31.1 (−0.5)	18.6 (−7.4)	39.0 (3.9)
Record low °F (°C)	−29 (−34)	−25 (−32)	−15 (−26)	6 (−14)	23 (−5)	33 (1)	41 (5)	38 (3)	27 (−3)	17 (−8)	−6 (−21)	−24 (−31)	−29 (−34)
Average precipitation inches (mm)	1.60 (41)	1.48 (38)	2.09 (53)	3.21 (82)	4.24 (108)	4.71 (120)	3.57 (91)	4.08 (104)	3.54 (90)	3.09 (78)	2.75 (70)	2.32 (59)	36.68 (934)
Source: NOAA

== Demographics ==
Historical population
Census	Pop.	Note	%±
1880	134		—
1890	303		126.1%
1900	522		72.3%
1910	682		30.7%
1920	775		13.6%
1930	1,101		42.1%
1940	1,098		−0.3%
1950	1,307		19.0%
1960	2,268		73.5%
1970	3,189		40.6%
1980	4,419		38.6%
1990	6,105		38.2%
2000	8,788		43.9%
2010	14,430		64.2%
2020	14,622		1.3%
U.S. Decennial Census; 2010 2020

=== Racial and ethnic composition ===
Antioch village, Illinois – Racial and ethnic composition Note: the US Census treats Hispanic/Latino as an ethnic category. This table excludes Latinos from the racial categories and assigns them to a separate category. Hispanics/Latinos may be of any race.
Race / Ethnicity (NH = Non-Hispanic)	Pop 2000	Pop 2010	Pop 2020	% 2000	% 2010	% 2020
White alone (NH)	8,098	11,972	11,328	92.15%	82.97%	77.47%
Black or African American alone (NH)	91	418	426	1.04%	2.90%	2.91%
Native American or Alaska Native alone (NH)	29	20	31	0.33%	0.14%	0.21%
Asian alone (NH)	102	525	485	1.16%	3.64%	3.32%
Native Hawaiian or Pacific Islander alone (NH)	1	13	4	0.01%	0.09%	0.03%
Other race alone (NH)	4	33	38	0.05%	0.23%	0.26%
Mixed race or Multiracial (NH)	75	218	689	0.85%	1.51%	4.71%
Hispanic or Latino (any race)	388	1,231	1,621	4.42%	8.53%	11.09%
Total	8,788	14,430	14,622	100.00%	100.00%	100.00%

=== 2020 census ===
As of the 2020 census, Antioch had a population of 14,622 and 3,961 families residing in the village.

The population density was 1,694.32 inhabitants per square mile (654.18/km^{2}). There were 5,479 housing units at an average density of 634.88 per square mile (245.13/km^{2}). Of all housing units, 3.9% were vacant; the homeowner vacancy rate was 1.4% and the rental vacancy rate was 3.7%.

There were 5,265 households in Antioch, of which 39.4% had children under the age of 18 living in them. Of all households, 56.9% were married-couple households, 14.5% were households with a male householder and no spouse or partner present, and 22.3% were households with a female householder and no spouse or partner present. About 21.5% of all households were made up of individuals and 9.0% had someone living alone who was 65 years of age or older.

The median age was 38.4 years. 26.6% of residents were under the age of 18 and 12.7% were 65 years of age or older. For every 100 females there were 97.9 males, and for every 100 females age 18 and over there were 95.0 males age 18 and over.

98.5% of residents lived in urban areas, while 1.5% lived in rural areas.

=== Income and poverty ===
The median income for a household in the village was $103,659, and the median income for a family was $111,445. Males had a median income of $57,018 versus $47,313 for females. The per capita income for the village was $41,671. About 6.2% of families and 7.1% of the population were below the poverty line, including 7.3% of those under age 18 and 11.0% of those age 65 or over.

== Economy ==
Since 1996, Metra's North Central Service has played an increasingly important role in Antioch's development. Weekday train service to and from Chicago has given rise to new commercial development near the train depot. The village continues to undergo commercial and residential growth, mostly along the Illinois Route 173 corridor.

Antioch is home to the Pickard China factory which makes fine china for Air Force One, Camp David, and others.

Downtown Antioch is home to locally owned clothing boutiques, eateries, bars, gift and décor shops, and specialty shops. It also hosts concerts in a bandshell, craft fairs, parades, festivals, art walks, and gardening tours.

== Arts and culture ==
Antioch has been home to the Palette, Masque and Lyre, Inc. (PM&L) Performing Arts theatre since 1960. In addition, the Antioch Fine Arts Foundation (AFAF) has operated in the area since 2001.

=== Library ===
The Antioch Public Library contains 135,716 volumes and circulates 371,105 items per year.

The Antioch Public Library began as an Antioch Women's Club project in 1921. Initially the Women's Club raised funds for the establishment of a village library and the residents donated books for the library. This first village library was located at 934 Main Street and was open only two days a week. In 1922 the library was moved to the Antioch Village Hall at 875 Main Street. In 1930 the library was moved again to the corner of Main Street and Depot Street. In 1941, the Library was moved again to 883 Main Street. In 1950 William Schroeder family donated the property located at 757 Main Street to the Village of Antioch for use as a library. The new library building was officially opened in 1970. In August 2001 construction began of an 18,000-square-foot addition to the Antioch Public Library facility. The construction was completed in January 2003.

=== Recreation ===
The Chain O'Lakes found along the Fox River, serves as an aquatic mecca for boating and summer leisure while skiing and snowmobiling abound during the winter months. Along with neighboring Fox Lake, Antioch has become host to numerous pro and amateur national fishing tournaments.

Kite flying is also a popular sporting event on Loon Lake during Labor Day Weekend. As of 2017, the Swiss Kiting Federation holds the record for the longest kite flight of 1 hour and 24 minutes. The village is bordered by four holdings of the Lake County Forest Preserve District.

== Government ==
=== Elected officials ===
The village of Antioch is a non-home rule municipality which functions under the council-manager form of government with a village President and a six-member Board of Trustees, all of whom are elected to four-year terms. The Village President and three of the Trustees are elected every four years. The other group of three Trustees are also elected for four-year terms, but this election is staggered and takes place two years after the first group.

Name	Profession	Term Notes
Scott J. Gartner	Village mayor	2021–2025
Mary C. Dominiak	Village trustee	2019–2023
Mary J. Pedersen	Village trustee	2021–2023
Jose Martinez	Village trustee	2025-2029
Ed Macek	Village trustee	2019–2023
Scott A. Pierce	Village trustee	2021–2025
Brent Bluthard	Village trustee	2021–2025

== Schools ==
Public schools

- Note: this list comprises schools located in Antioch. Not all Antioch school students will attend the following schools.

Elementary Schools

- W.C. Petty Elementary School (K-5)
- Hillcrest Elementary School (PK-5)
- Antioch Elementary School (K-5)
- Emmons Grade School (K-8)
- Grass Lake Elementary School (PK-8)

Middle Schools

- Antioch Upper Grade School (6–8)

High School (9–12)

- Antioch Community High School

=== Private schools ===
Private middle schools:

- Faith Evangelical Lutheran School (Grades PK-8) CLOSED
- St. Peter Catholic School (Grades PK-8) CLOSED

== Infrastructure ==
=== Transportation ===
Metra service is provided from Antioch to Chicago Union Station via the North Central Service. Bus service within Antioch and throughout Lake County is provided by Pace.

Western Kenosha County Transit Route 2 serves parts of Antioch Monday-Saturday, connecting riders to several towns, villages and unincorporated municipalities throughout Kenosha County. Riders can also transfer to Route 1 and Route 3 to travel to Kenosha and Lake Geneva, respectively.

Antioch is located approximately 43 miles north of Chicago O'Hare International Airport and 40 miles south of General Mitchell International Airport in Milwaukee.

=== Major streets ===
Several major highways and state routes cross over and travel around Antioch.

Sign	Route number	Local name	Location description
	Illinois Route 83	Main Street	Runs N-S through the town center
	Illinois Route 59		ends in Antioch at the junction with Illinois Route 173
	Illinois Route 173		Runs E-W through the Township and Village of Antioch.
	U.S. Route 45		Runs N-S along the eastern edge of town, from WI to Lindenhurst, IL.
		North Avenue	Runs E-W on the "North" side of town, from Wadsworth, IL, along the IL-WI Border, to the East Side of Lake Catherine in Unincorporated Antioch Township.
		Depot Street	Runs E-W, from Deep Lake Rd to Main St and becomes Orchard St West of Main St to the intersection with David St.
		Deep Lake Road	Runs N-S, from WI border to Grand Ave. Lindenhurst, IL.
		Grass Lake Road	Runs E-W from Milburn, IL through Lindenhurst, IL over the Southern end of Grass Lake into the Village of Fox Lake, IL.

=== Public safety ===
The Antioch Police Department (APD) is responsible for law enforcement in Antioch.

The Antioch Fire Department provides fire and emergency medical services with contract service, part time and paid on call firefighters and Paramedics. The fire department currently uses three fire stations to house its different equipment, and all three are staffed with personnel. Antioch Fire Department has an array of equipment to use including several engines, two water tenders, two boats including an air boat, and a six-wheeled vehicle to access hard to reach areas. Antioch Fire Dept. also owns several pieces of special equipment including new state of the art extrication equipment used to extricate injured people from wrecked cars. The Antioch First Fire Protection District was the first organized fire protection district in the state. The Fire Department also has an Explorer post for youths ages 15 to 20 interested in making the fire service a career.

Until 2014, EMS was provided by the volunteer Antioch Rescue Squad. The Antioch Rescue Squad was the first licensed paramedic unit in the State of Illinois.

The police department and the fire department are housed in separate buildings next to each other. The Antioch Village Board elected to close the communication center in 2012, electing to outsource all of its 911 emergency dispatch service (Police, Fire, and Rescue) to another center located in Round Lake Beach. In March 1993, the Antioch Police Department became a part of the Lake County Enhanced 911 system.

== Notable people ==
- Dale Barnstable (1925–2019), two time NCAA Basketball champion at University of Kentucky, drafted by the Boston Celtics, but never played professionally due to a point shaving scandal
- Tiffany Brooks (born 1979) winner of 2013 HGTV Design Star
- Paul DeJong (born 1993), Major League Baseball infielder for the Kansas City Royals.
- Joe Gliniewicz (1963–2015), Fox Lake, Illinois police officer who staged his own suicide is buried in Antioch
- Fred Hawkins (1923–2014), PGA Tour golfer
- Jim McMillen (1902–1984), guard for Chicago Bears for seven seasons; also former mayor of Antioch
- Kyle Rittenhouse (born 2003), Antioch native and political figure who shot and killed two people in the 2020 Kenosha unrest
- John Thain (born 1955), chairman and former CEO of CIT Group, former CEO of Merrill Lynch, former CEO of the New York Stock Exchange
- Tom Wittum (1950–2010), football player for San Francisco 49ers
