= Western Kenosha County Transit =

- Founded: 2007
- Headquarters: 1218 79th Street
- Locale: Kenosha, Wisconsin
- Service area: Kenosha County, Wisconsin
- Service type: bus service
- Routes: 1
- Hubs: 3
- Fleet: 5 buses
- Operator: Kenosha Achievement Center

Western Kenosha County Transit is a regional bus service operating route deviation and door-to-door service throughout Kenosha County, Wisconsin, mainly serving the rural areas west of Interstate 94. Western Kenosha County Transit runs a weekday route deviation service between Twin Lakes and the city of Kenosha. There is also a weekday rush hour commuter shuttle between Twin Lakes and the Metra Train Station in Antioch, Illinois. Expanded regional routes offer weekly trips to Antioch and Lake Geneva, Wisconsin, with home pick-up service available. The door-to-door service does not require certification and is open to the general public. Riders must call at least one day in advance to schedule a door-to-door trip. Service operates within Kenosha County as well as to Burlington, Lake Geneva, and Antioch.

Western Kenosha County Transit and Kenosha Area Transit honor one another's transfers.

Saturday service was discontinued effective January 1, 2011.

In February 2014, a new schedule was issued which increased the flexibility of the route service by encouraging riders to utilize the route deviation option. Deviations up to a half of a mile off the route are available to all riders for an additional $1.00 charge. Additionally, bus stops at two residential complexes in Twin Lakes and a stop at the Twin Lakes Community Library were added.

== Routes ==
=== Regular route ===
- Route 1 - Western County Bus Service (Twin Lakes-Silver Lake-Paddock Lake-Kenosha)

=== Commuter shuttles ===
- Twin Lakes to Antioch

=== Expanded regional routes ===
- Monday, Wednesday, Friday service from Twin Lakes to Lake Geneva, Wisconsin (home pick-up available)
- Thursday mid-day service from Twin Lakes to Antioch (home pick-up available)
