= O'Hare, Chicago =

Community area in Chicago, Illinois

O'Hare
- Community area
- Community Area 76 - O'Hare
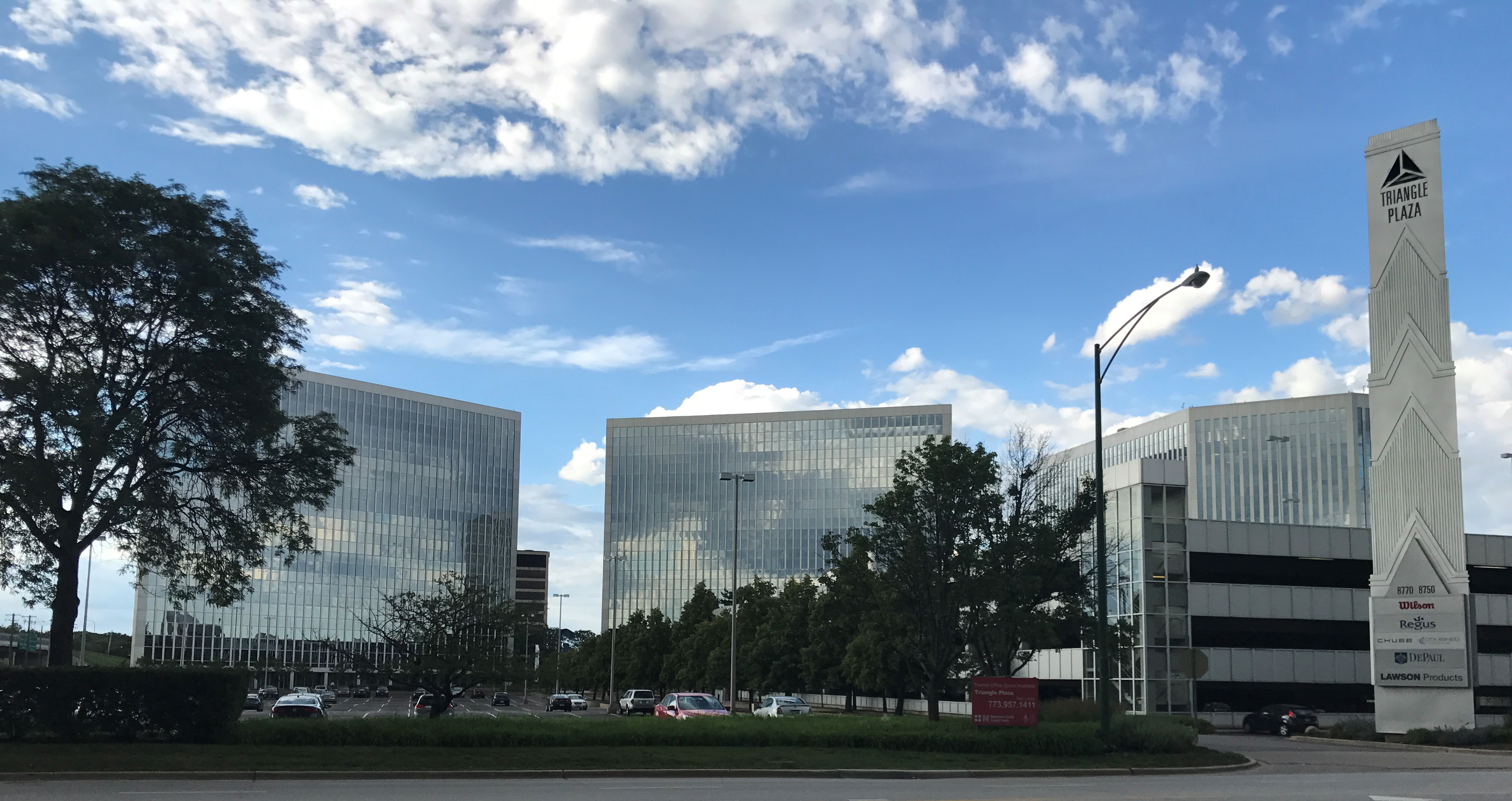
- The Triangle Plaza corporate complex

- Location within the city of Chicago
- Coordinates: 42°00′N 87°55′W
- Country: United States
- State: Illinois
- County: Cook; DuPage
- City: Chicago
- Named for: O'Hare Airport
- Neighborhoods: list: O'Hare; Schorsch Forest View

Area
  - Total: 13.34 sq mi (34.55 km^{2})

Population (2024)
  - Total: 14,394
  - Density: 1,079/sq mi (416.6/km^{2})

Demographics (2024)
  - White: 61.9%
  - Black: 6.1%
  - Hispanic: 11.4%
  - Asian: 14.4%
  - Other: 6.1%
- Time zone: UTC-6 (CST)
  - Summer (DST): UTC-5 (CDT)
- ZIP Codes: 60656 and 60666
- Median income 2024: $83,116
- Source: U.S. Census, Record Information Services

O'Hare is one of the 77 community areas of Chicago in Illinois, United States, located on the far north side of Chicago. Chicago O'Hare International Airport is located within the boundaries of this community area. This community area is the only one that extends outside Cook County; the western edge (an area comprising the southwest part of the airport) is in DuPage County.

The area is a transportation hub containing O'Hare International Airport as well as major roads such as Interstate 90, its auxiliary Interstate 190, Interstate 294, Illinois Route 72, Illinois Route 171, U.S. Route 12 and U.S. Route 45. This allows the O'Hare neighborhood, combined with the nearby suburb of Rosemont, to work as an edge city.

== History ==
In the Second Treaty of Prairie du Chien, Alexander Robinson was given two square miles of land in what is now the O'Hare community area as a reward for shielding white settlers during Battle of Fort Dearborn. The land was slowly settled over the remainder of the nineteenth century despite the opening of a railroad depot in 1887. During World War II, the Douglas Aircraft Company produced cargo planes in the area. After the war, the facility became a commercial airport that the City of Chicago eventually developed into O'Hare International Airport. In response to the annexation, the University of Chicago revised its map of official community areas to add O'Hare as the 76th area. It is one of only two revisions to occur since the late 1920s.

== Demographics ==
Historical population
Census	Pop.	Note	%±
1960	311		—
1970	6,230		1,903.2%
1980	11,073		77.7%
1990	11,214		1.3%
2000	11,940		6.5%
2010	12,756		6.8%
2020	13,418		5.2%
2024 (est.)	14,394		7.3%
U.S. Decennial Census

According to an analysis by the Chicago Metropolitan Agency for Planning, the area had 14,394 residents comprising 6,652 households as of June 2024. The racial makeup of the area was 61.9% white, 6.1% African American, 14.4% Asian American and 6.1% were either American Indian, Alaska Native, Native Hawaiian-Pacific Islander or some other race. Hispanic or Latino residents of any race were 11.4% of the population.

20.6% were under the age of 20 years, 22.5% were age 20 years to age 34 years, 26.4% were age 35 years to age 49 years, 16.5% were age 50 years to age 64 years and 14% were 65 years or older.

The median household income was $83,116 compared to a median income of $77,902 for Chicago at-large. The area had an Income distribution in which 11.4% of households earned less than $25,000 annually; 16.9% of households earned between $25,000 and $49,999; 18% of households earned between $50,000 and $74,999; 11.5% of households earned between $75,000 and $99,999; 24.4% of households earned between $100,000 and $149,999 and 17.9% of households earned more than $150,000.

== Economy ==
The corporate headquarters of Bally Total Fitness, Independent Grocers Alliance, Lafarge North America, True Value and U.S. Cellular are located in the O'Hare area. The Consulate-General of the Dominican Republic, which is responsible for facilitating trade between the Dominican Republic and the United States is located at 8700 West Bryn Mawr Avenue. Nippon Cargo Airlines and Suzlon Energy have their American headquarters in the O'Hare community area. O'Hare was home to the headquarters of Wilson Sporting Goods until 2016, when the company chose to move to One Prudential Plaza.

The top five employing industry sectors in O'Hare are transportation (59.2%), accommodation and food (7.6%), professional (6.3%), administration (4.7%), and information (4.6%). 68.5% of these workers come from outside of Chicago. The top five employing industry sectors of community residents are healthcare (11.5%), retail trade (9.9%), manufacturing (8.7%), transportation (8.4%), and administration (8.2%)

== Notable people ==
- Joseph Grendys (born 1961), chairman, president, CEO, and owner of Koch Foods. He is a resident of the O'Hare area.
- Joseph Miedzianowski (born 1953), Chicago police officer convicted of using his position as a member of the gangs task force to run a narcotics trafficking ring. He resided on the 8500 block of West St. Joseph Avenue before his arrest.

== Transportation ==
Transportation in the area is centered on access to the airport. The O'Hare Transfer station is on the Metra North Central Service. The Blue Line runs through this area connecting the airport to downtown. Accessibility to people not going directly to or coming from the airport is served at the Schorsch Forest View neighborhood's Cumberland Avenue station or the nearby Rosemont-River Road station.

== Education ==
The O'Hare area is part of City of Chicago School District#299 and City Colleges of Chicago District#508. For the residential areas, the zoned K-8 school is Everett McKinley Dirksen School, while William Howard Taft High School serves as the high school. The nearest City Colleges campus is Wilbur Wright College in neighboring Dunning. The O'Hare neighborhood is also home to a DePaul University satellite campus. In 2024, 41.3 percent of adults over the age of 25 had a bachelor's degree or higher, an increase from 29.3 percent in 2000. 92.0 percent of adults had graduated high school, an increase from 83.0 percent in 2000.

== Politics ==
The O'Hare community area is located in two wards: The area north of Lawrence Avenue is in the 41st ward and the area to the south is in the 38th ward. They are represented on the Chicago City Council by Anthony Napolitano and Nicholas Sposato respectively.

In the United States House of Representatives, the O'Hare community area is divided between Illinois's 5th and Illinois's 9th congressional districts, represented by Democrats Mike Quigley and Jan Schakowsky respectively. The area is similarly divided in the state legislature. It is represented by Democrats Robert Martwick and Laura Murphy in the Illinois Senate and by Democrat Marty Moylan and Republican Bradley Stephens in the Illinois House of Representatives.

In the 2016 presidential election, the O'Hare area cast 2,300 votes for Hillary Clinton, 1,966 votes Donald Trump, 112 votes for Gary Johnson and 62 votes for Jill Stein. In the 2012 presidential election, the O'Hare area cast 2,241 votes for Barack Obama and 1,769 votes for Mitt Romney.
