= North Central Service =

Metra commuter rail line in the Chicago area

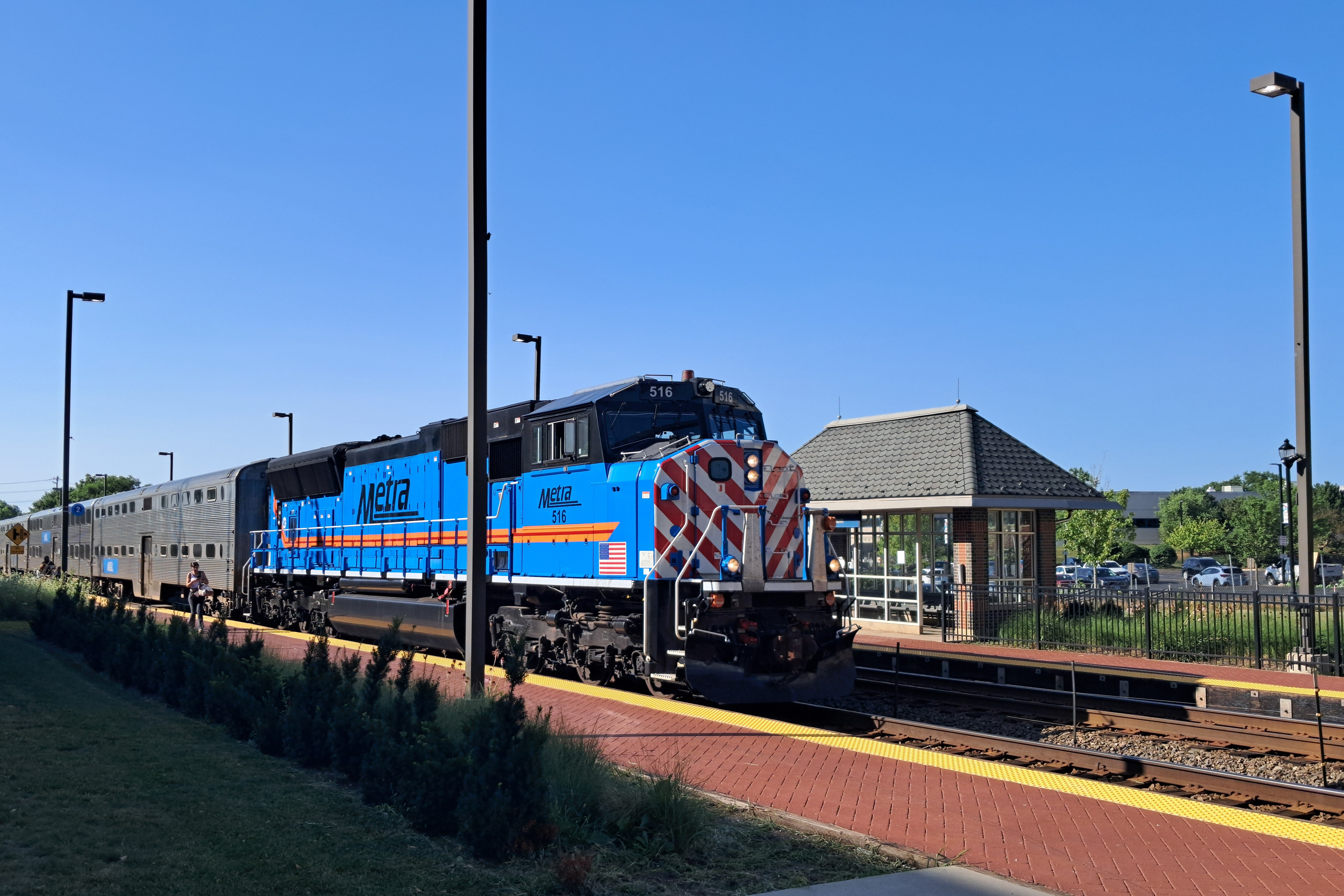
- A North Central Service train at Mundelein station in 2026.

Overview
- Owner: Metra (Chicago Union Station to Franklin Park); CN (Franklin Park to Antioch)
- Termini: Union Station; Antioch
- Stations: 18
- Website: metra.com/train-lines/ncs

Service
- Type: Commuter rail
- System: Metra
- Operator: Metra
- Daily ridership: 5,800 (Avg. Weekday 2016)
- Ridership: 663,660 (2025)

History
- Opened: 1886 (Soo Line), August 19, 1996 (Metra)

Technical
- Line length: 52.9 mi (85.1 km)
- Track gauge: 4 ft 8 1/2 in (1,435 mm) standard gauge

The North Central Service (NCS) is a Metra commuter rail line running from Union Station in downtown Chicago through northwestern and far northern suburbs to Antioch, Illinois. In December 2022, the public timetable shows seven weekday departures from Chicago. This line does not run at all on weekends or holidays. While Metra does not explicitly refer to any of its eleven routes by colors, the NCS' timetable accents are lavender, a shade of purple. It is one of two Metra lines (the other being the Union Pacific West Line) that do not have a specific color for a fallen flag railroad that used to operate on the route.

Between Union Station and River Grove, the North Central Service shares tracks with the Milwaukee District West Line, but does not stop at any of the intermediate stations used by the MD-W between Western Avenue and River Grove. In Franklin Park, Illinois, this route turns north at a junction known as Tower B-12. The rest of the route operates on the Canadian National Railway's Waukesha Subdivision. Until 2020, a single daily inbound train, no. 120, made all stops along the North Central Service from Antioch to Washington Street, then switched to the Milwaukee District North Line's tracks at a diamond near Prairie Crossing station, made stops at Libertyville and Lake Forest, and then ran as an express to Union Station.

The CN assumed ownership of this route on September 7, 2001, when it absorbed the Wisconsin Central Railroad ("WC"). The WC operated on this route after it was purchased from the Soo Line Railroad in April 1987. Metra provides its own crews for this service (like with most routes) and operates under a trackage rights agreement with the CN.

Service began August 19, 1996. As of 2026, this is the only new commuter line in the Metra system since its formation. Prior to the start of NCS, the last passenger service on this route ended in January 1965, when the Soo Line discontinued the overnight Chicago-Duluth Laker.

The North Central Service serves O'Hare International Airport, but with a limited number of trains. O'Hare has much more frequent service from the CTA Blue Line.

As of February 15, 2024, Metra operates 14 trains (seven in each direction) on the line on weekdays, with all trains running the full length of the route from Antioch to Union Station. One inbound train and one outbound train run express between Western Avenue and Wheeling.

Like the Heritage Corridor and SouthWest Service, the North Central Service is fully ADA-accessible.

No tickets are sold at any North Central Service stations outside Chicago. Passengers must purchase tickets either on the train or with Ventra.

== Recent history ==
On January 30, 2006, four new stations on the North Central Service opened: Belmont Avenue in Franklin Park, Schiller Park, Rosemont, and Washington Street in Grayslake. Service doubled from 10 to 20 trains per day with this change in the timetable, combined with double tracking of large portions of the line and the CN rerouting freight traffic south of Mundelein.

On September 11, 2006, service expanded from 20 to 22 trains when Metra split one rush-hour local train in each direction into two express trains.

Notably, the line goes through Des Plaines but does not have a station there. The station in Des Plaines was on Thacker Street and closed in 1965. However, Des Plaines is currently serviced by the Union Pacific Northwest Line.

Metra has considered adding weekend service to the North Central Service ever since Saturday service was added to the SouthWest Service, and has also considered operating six trains between Chicago and Antioch, like the SouthWest Service.

On February 5, 2018, service was reduced from 22 to 20 trains when Metra combined two rush-hour express trains into one rush hour semi-express.

As of April 2021, NCS service is limited to rush hours in the peak direction only–towards Chicago in the morning and towards Antioch in the afternoon. This makes the NCS one of 3 Metra lines (along with the Heritage Corridor and the SouthWest Service) to only offer peak service.

From August 12–30, 2024 during the 2024 Democratic National Convention, Metra operated expanded NCS service. The regularly scheduled weekday trains were supplemented by 15 hourly round trips between O'Hare Transfer station and Union Station, making only intermediate stops at River Grove and Western Avenue. On weekends, there were 16 hourly round trips serving the same stations, with no service north of O'Hare Transfer.

== Ridership ==
Between 2014 and 2019, annual ridership declined 12.5% from 1,817,335 to 1,589,905. Due to the COVID-19 pandemic, ridership dropped to 340,682 passengers in 2020 and to 146,668 passengers in 2021. As of October 2024, ridership is at 41% of its October 2019 total (compared to a 63% recovery rate system-wide). Similar to other lines, midday ridership is almost at pre-pandemic levels, with ridership during peak hours being proportionally less-recovered. The line's 663,660 riders in 2025 made it the tenth most used Metra line as well as the second least used.

== Stations ==
County	Zone	Location	Station	Connections and notes
Lake	4	Antioch	Antioch	Western Transit: Antioch Service
Lake	4	Lake Villa	Lake Villa	
Lake	4	Round Lake Beach	Round Lake Beach	
Lake	4	Grayslake	Washington Street	
Lake	4	Libertyville	Prairie Crossing	Metra: Milwaukee District North
Lake	4	Mundelein	Mundelein	Pace: 572, 574
Lake	4	Vernon Hills	Vernon Hills	
Lake	4	Prairie View	Prairie View	
Lake	4	Buffalo Grove	Buffalo Grove	Pace: 234, 272, 626
Cook	3	Wheeling	Wheeling	Pace: 234
Cook	3	Prospect Heights	Prospect Heights	Pace: 221
Cook	2	Chicago	O'Hare Transfer	ATS to O'Hare International Airport; Pace Pulse: ■ Dempster Line; Pace: 250, 330
Cook	2	Rosemont	Rosemont	Pace: 330
Cook	2	Schiller Park	Schiller Park	
Cook	2	Franklin Park	Belmont Avenue/Franklin Park	Pace: 319
Cook	2	River Grove	River Grove	Metra: Milwaukee District West; Pace: 319, 331
Cook	2	Chicago	Western Avenue	Metra: Milwaukee District North, Milwaukee District West; CTA buses: 49 X49 65
Cook	1	Chicago	Union Station	Amtrak (long-distance): California Zephyr, Cardinal, City of New Orleans, Empire Builder, Floridian, Lake Shore Limited, Southwest Chief, Texas Eagle; Amtrak (intercity): Blue Water, Borealis, Hiawatha, Illini and Saluki, Illinois Zephyr and Carl Sandburg, Lincoln Service, Pere Marquette, Wolverine; Metra: BNSF, Heritage Corridor, Milwaukee District North, Milwaukee District West, SouthWest Service; Chicago "L": Blue (at Clinton), Brown Orange Pink Purple (at Quincy); CTA buses: 1 7 J14 19 28 56 60 120 121 124 125 126 128 130 151 156 157 192; Pace: 755; Amtrak Thruway: Chicago–Madison and Chicago–Rockford (Van Galder), Chicago–Louisville (Greyhound)
