= Antioch station (Illinois) =

Commuter rail station in Antioch, Illinois

Antioch

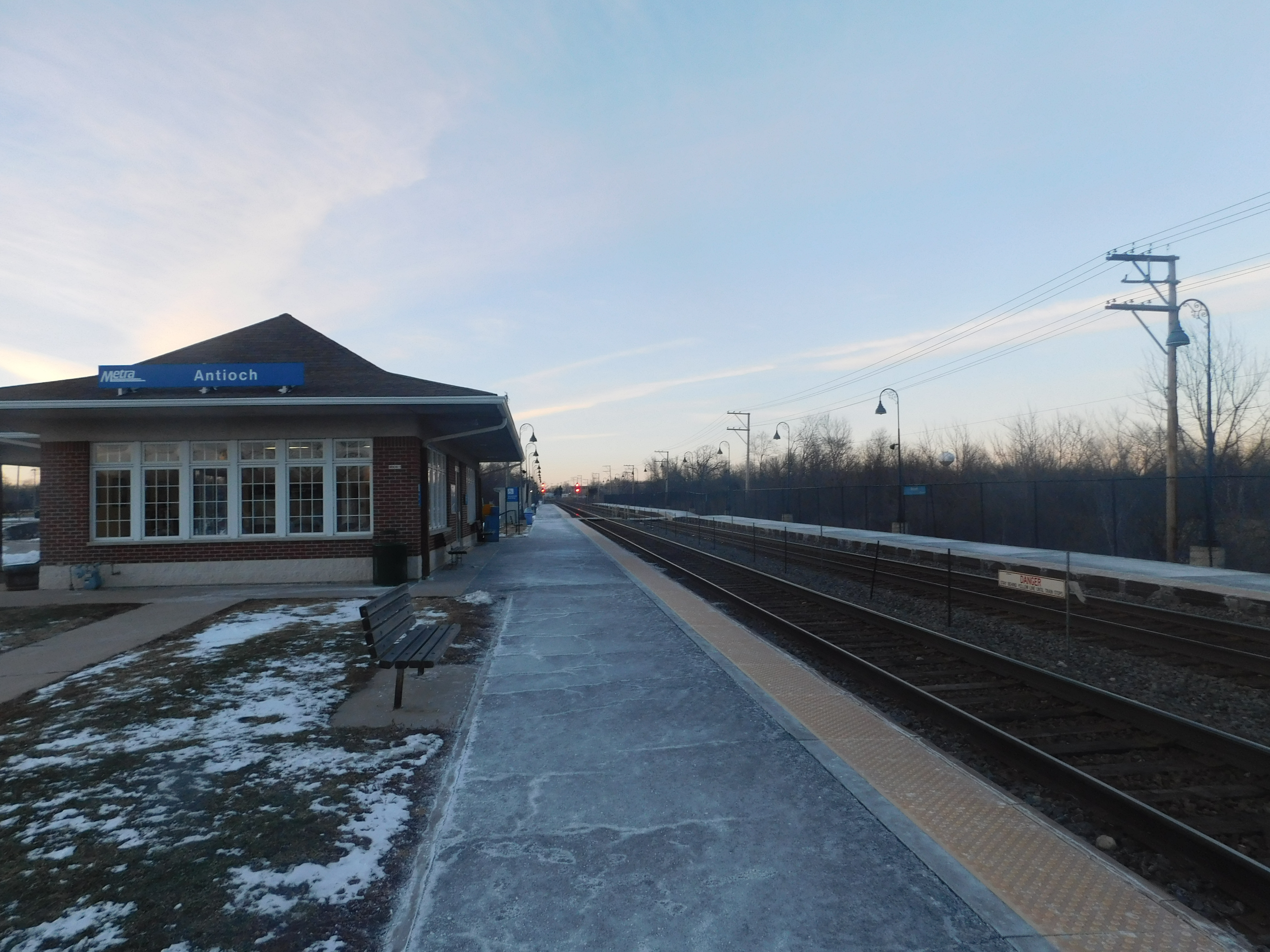
- Antioch station in February 2016

General information
- Location: 305 Depot Street; Antioch, Illinois
- Coordinates: 42.4810°N 88.0923°W
- Owner: Metra
- Line: CN Waukesha Subdivision
- Platforms: 2 side platforms
- Tracks: 2
- Connections: Western Kenosha County Transit

Construction
- Accessible: Yes

Other information
- Fare zone: 4

History
- Opened: August 19, 1996

Passengers
- 2018: 192 (average weekday) ▲4.35%
- Rank: 165 out of 236

Services
Preceding station	Metra	Following station
Terminus	North Central Service	Lake Villa toward Union Station
Former services
Preceding station	Soo Line	Following station
Trevor toward Portal	Main Line	Lake Villa toward Chicago
Track layout
Location

Antioch is a Metra commuter rail station in Antioch, Illinois, and is the northern terminus of the North Central Service. The station is 52.9 miles (85.1 km) away from Chicago Union Station, the southern terminus of the line. In Metra's zone-based fare system, Antioch is in zone 4. As of 2018, Antioch is the 165th busiest of Metra's 236 non-downtown stations, with an average of 192 weekday boardings. The Illinois/Wisconsin border is just to the north of the station.

As of February 15, 2024, Antioch is served by all 14 trains (seven in each direction) on weekdays, with all trains originating and terminating here.

== Bus connections ==
Western Kenosha County Transit - Route 2
