= Waukesha Subdivision =

Railway line in Wisconsin and Illinois

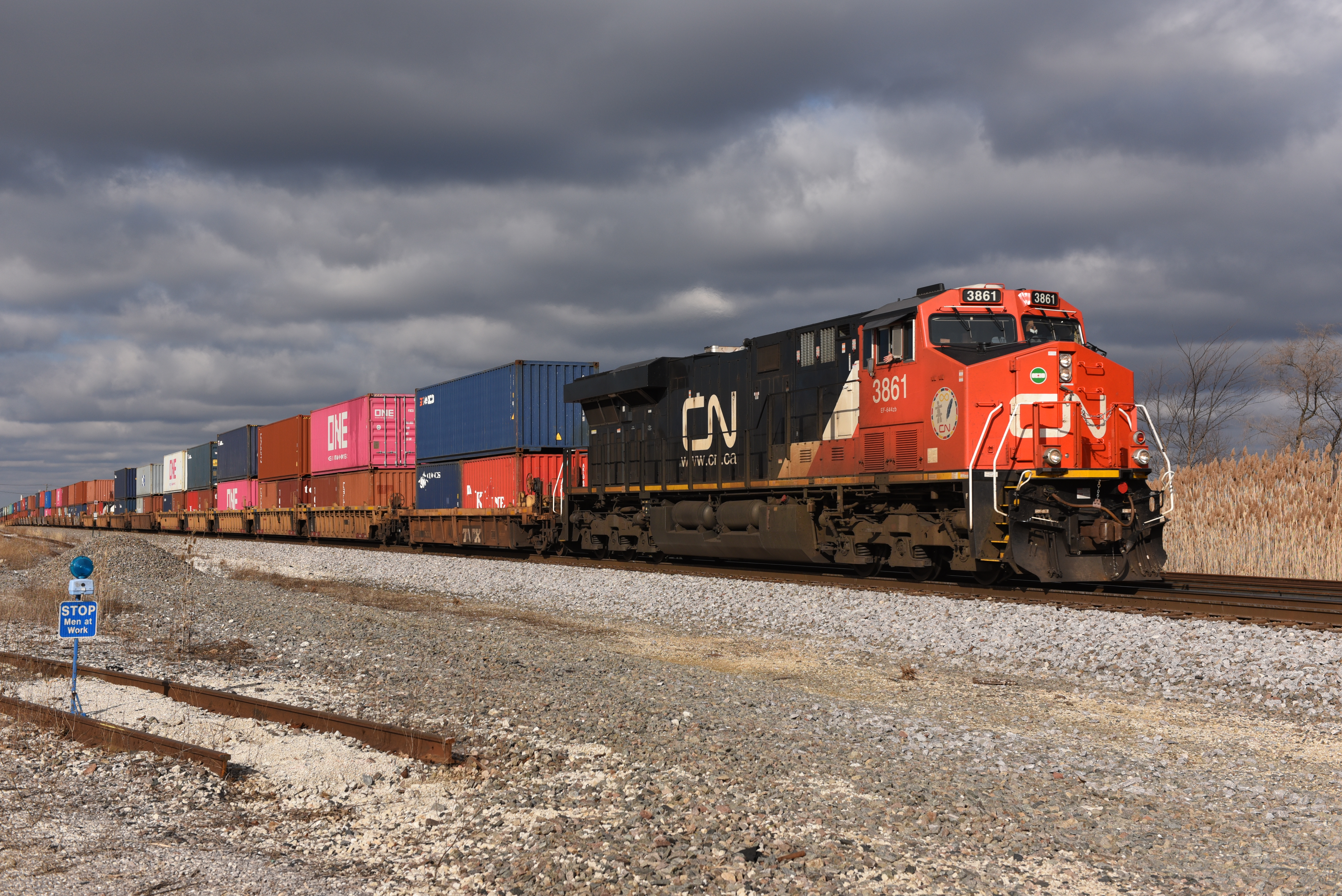
- A container train at Grayslake, Illinois in 2020

Overview
- Status: Active
- Owner: Canadian National Railway
- Locale: Wisconsin, Illinois
- Termini: Fond du Lac; Chicago

Service
- Type: Freight, passenger
- Operator(s): Canadian National Railway, Wisconsin and Southern Railroad, Metra

History
- Commenced: 1882
- Completed: 1886

Technical
- Number of tracks: 1–2
- Track gauge: 4 ft 8 1/2 in (1,435 mm) standard gauge

The Waukesha Subdivision or Waukesha Sub is a railway line owned and operated by the Canadian National Railway. It meets the Neenah Subdivision to the north in Fond du Lac, Wisconsin and runs south to Chicago, Illinois.

== History ==
Construction of the line started in 1882 by the Wisconsin Central Railroad and was completed in 1886. The railroad was reorganized from bankruptcy in 1897 and became the Wisconsin Central Railway.

The Minneapolis, St. Paul and Sault Ste. Marie Railroad (the original Soo Line) gained control in 1901 and leased the WC in 1902. The Soo Line operated the WC as its Chicago Division. After the 1961 Soo Line-WC-DSS&A merger that created the Soo Line Railroad, the railroad reduced the number of its operating divisions from five to three; the Schiller Park to Fond du Lac segment became the Soo Line's First Subdivision of the Eastern Division.

After the Soo Line acquired the Chicago, Milwaukee, St. Paul and Pacific Railroad (Milwaukee Road) in the bankruptcy auction, the line, among others, was placed in the Lake States Transportation Division in an attempt to cut costs. After the failure of this cost-cutting exercise, the LSTD was sold to Wisconsin Central Ltd. in 1987, which was then sold to Canadian National in 2001.

== Current operations ==
The Wisconsin and Southern Railroad has trackage rights over the line from Slinger to Waukesha, and freight cars are interchanged between the two railroad companies in Ackerville. Metra, Chicago's commuter rail service provider, also operates on this line as its North Central Service route (between Chicago Union Station and the B-12 junction in Franklin Park, Illinois, NCS trains use the Milwaukee District West Line, but do not stop at any of its stations, with the exceptions of the Western Avenue station at Metra Tower A-2 and the River Grove station). In Forest Park, Illinois at Madison Street, the subdivision connects with the B&OCT (CSX)'s Altenheim Subdivision and continues into Chicago. Also, Soo Line passenger trains historically used this line at Forest Park to access the Baltimore & Ohio Railroad's Grand Central Station (Chicago).

One of the obstacles faced by southbound trains is Byron Hill, which was a helper district when the line was operated by the Soo Line. Canadian National double-tracked that part of the line shortly after acquiring it.
