= Libertyville station =

Commuter rail station in Libertyville, Illinois

Libertyville

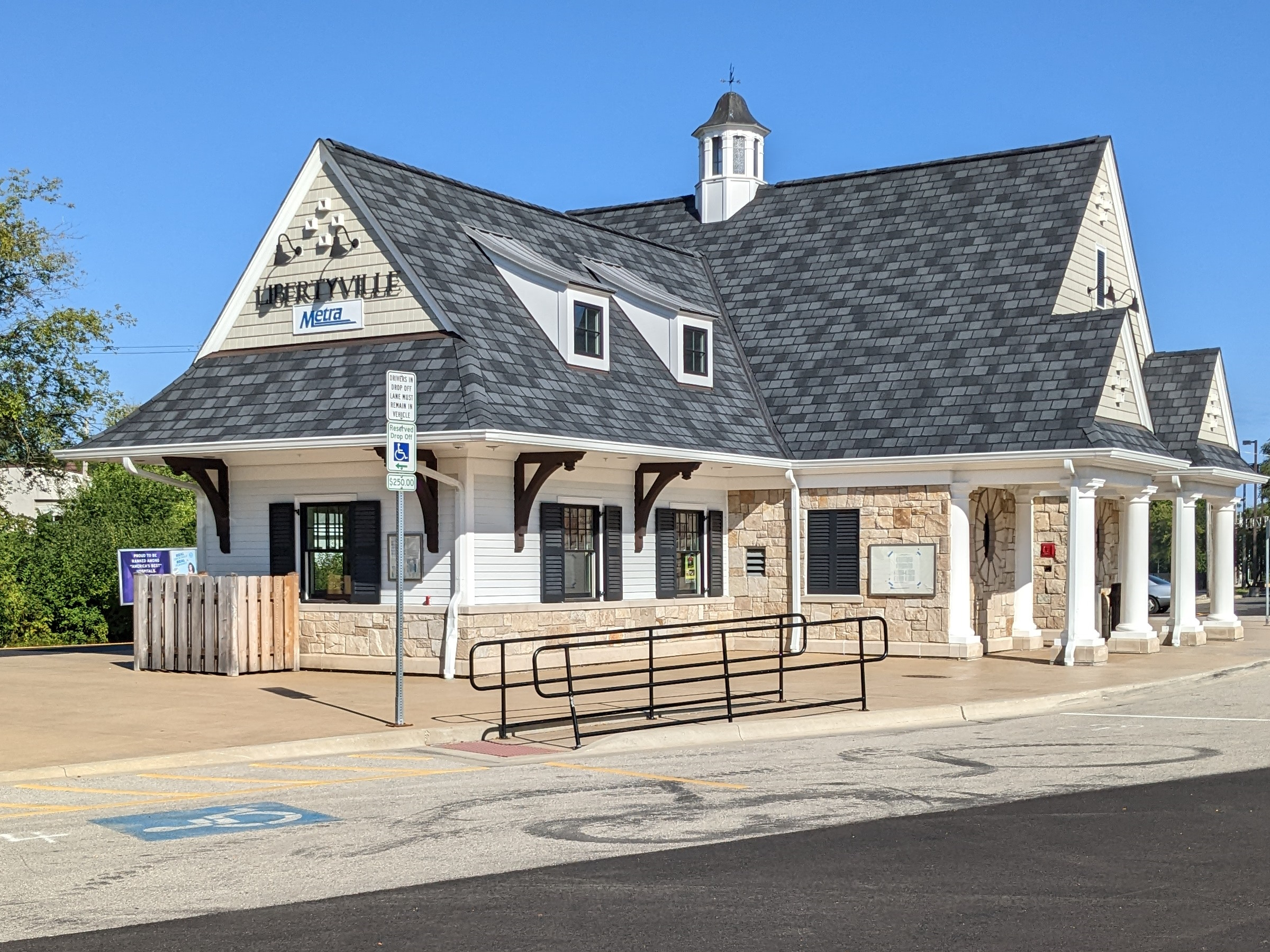
- Libertyville station in September 2022

General information
- Location: 200 West Lake Street at Milwaukee Avenue; Libertyville, Illinois
- Coordinates: 42.2911°N 87.9565°W
- Owner: Metra
- Line: Fox Lake Subdivision
- Platforms: 1 side platform
- Tracks: 1
- Connections: Pace Bus

Construction
- Platform levels: 1
- Parking: Yes
- Cycle facilities: Yes
- Accessible: Yes

Other information
- Fare zone: 4

History
- Opened: 1881

Passengers
- 2018: 801 (average weekday) ▼3.8%
- Rank: 65 out of 236

Services
Preceding station	Metra	Following station
Prairie Crossing toward Fox Lake	Milwaukee District North	Lake Forest toward Union Station
Former services
Preceding station	Metra	Following station
Prairie Crossing toward Fox Lake	Milwaukee District North	Rondout closed 1984 toward Union Station
Preceding station	Milwaukee Road	Following station
Grays Lake toward Madison	Madison – Rondout	Rondout Terminus
Grays Lake toward Walworth	Suburban Service North Line	Rondout toward Chicago
Track layout
Location

Libertyville is one of two commuter railroad stations on Metra's Milwaukee District North Line in Libertyville, Illinois. The station is officially located on 200 West Lake Street near Milwaukee Avenue (IL 21), is 35.5 miles (57.1 km) away from Chicago Union Station, the southern terminus of the line, and serves commuters between Union Station and Fox Lake, Illinois. In Metra's zone-based fare system, Libertyville is in zone 4. As of 2018, Libertyville is the 65th busiest of Metra's 236 non-downtown stations, with an average of 801 weekday boardings.

As of February 15, 2024, Libertyville is served by 37 trains (17 inbound, 20 outbound) on weekdays, by 18 trains (nine in each direction) on Saturdays, and by all 18 trains (nine in each direction) on Sundays and holidays.

Parking is available at the station house on Lake Street and the corner of Milwaukee Avenue and Newberry Avenue. The main parking lot is accessible from the intersection of Lake Street and Brainerd Avenue, as well as Milwaukee Avenue along the south side of the tracks. A second smaller parking lot exists on the north side of Lake Street between Brainerd and Milwaukee Avenues. A parking garage is located at the corner of Lake Street and Brainerd Avenue, which can be accessed on both streets. All parking areas are south of the tracks.

Two other Metra stations exist in Libertyville, and both are in a section of town known as Prairie Crossing. One station serves the Milwaukee District North Line, while the other serves the North Central Service, with both stations in walking distance of each other.

The Libertyville station used to be east of Milwaukee Avenue near Newberry Avenue. Then a new station was built west of Milwaukee Avenue, and the old station site was converted into a gas station. Prior to that, the original station was located on First Street and was a terminus of the Chicago, Milwaukee and St. Paul Railroad. The station was relocated to the east side of Milwaukee Avenue some time after a western extension of the railroad was built to Fox Lake and on into Wisconsin. The site of the original station at First Street continued to handle freight traffic for many years but is now the site of a condominium complex, although overgrown tracks still lead from the railroad to the site.

Libertyville and most other stations on the Fox Lake Subdivision are unlike many other stations in the Metra system, due to their one-track one-platform setup. The Fox Lake subdivision is single tracked for a majority of the branch, with only Grayslake having two tracks and platforms. For this reason, some rush hour trains terminate at Lake Forest or Deerfield.

Currently, the Libertyville station is served by the pace 574 bus between the College of Lake County and the Hawthorn Mall with service on weekdays and Saturdays. Additionally, from 1978 to 1981, a rush hour feeder service ran between Mundelein and the station, and the later introduction of the North Central Service made such a service redundant.
