= Round Lake station =

Commuter rail station in Round Lake, Illinois

Round Lake

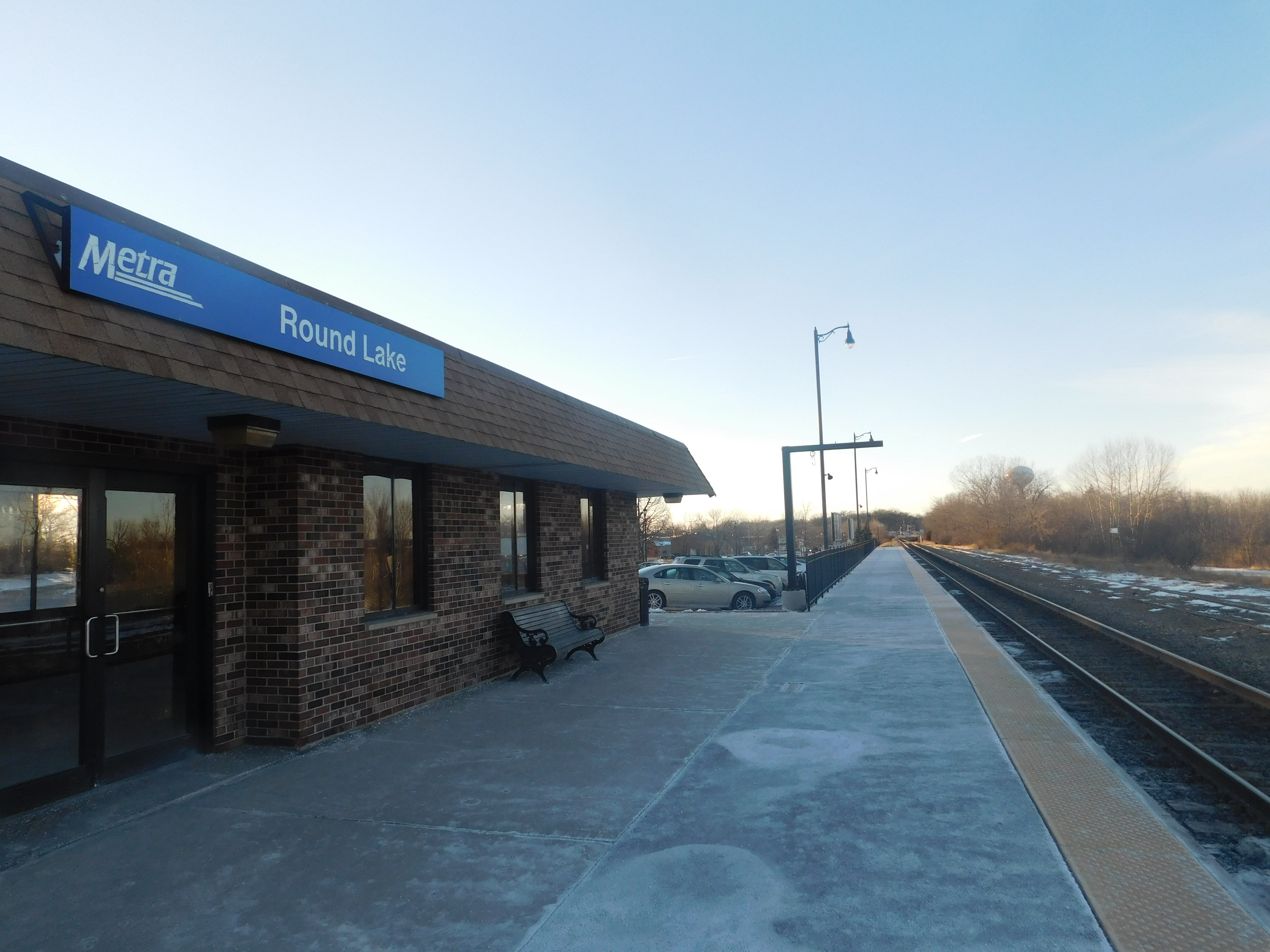
- Round Lake station in February 2016

General information
- Location: Route 134 and Cedar Lake Road; Round Lake, Illinois
- Coordinates: 42.3546°N 88.0941°W
- Owner: Metra
- Line: Fox Lake Subdivision
- Platforms: 1 side platform
- Tracks: 2 (1 ends at the station)
- Connections: Pace Bus

Construction
- Parking: Yes
- Accessible: Yes

Other information
- Fare zone: 4

History
- Rebuilt: 1974

Passengers
- 2018: 395 (average weekday) ▼5.3%
- Rank: 121 out of 236

Services
Preceding station	Metra	Following station
Long Lake toward Fox Lake	Milwaukee District North	Grayslake toward Union Station
Former services
Preceding station	Milwaukee Road	Following station
Long Lake toward Madison	Madison – Rondout	Grays Lake toward Rondout
Long Lake toward Walworth	Suburban Service North Line	Grays Lake toward Chicago
Track layout
Location

Round Lake is a commuter railroad station on Metra's Milwaukee District North Line in Round Lake, Illinois. The station is located at IL 134 and Cedar Lake Road, is 44.2 miles (71.1 km) away from Chicago Union Station, the southern terminus of the line, and serves commuters between Union Station and Fox Lake, Illinois. In Metra's zone-based fare system, Round Lake is in zone 4. As of 2018, Round Lake is the 121st busiest of Metra's 236 non-downtown stations, with an average of 395 weekday boardings.

As of February 15, 2024, Round Lake is served by 29 trains (13 inbound, 16 outbound) on weekdays, by 18 trains (nine in each direction) on Saturdays, and by all 18 trains (nine in each direction) on Sundays and holidays.

== Bus connections ==
Pace

- 570 Fox Lake-CLC
