= Long Lake station =

Commuter rail station in Long Lake, Illinois

Long Lake

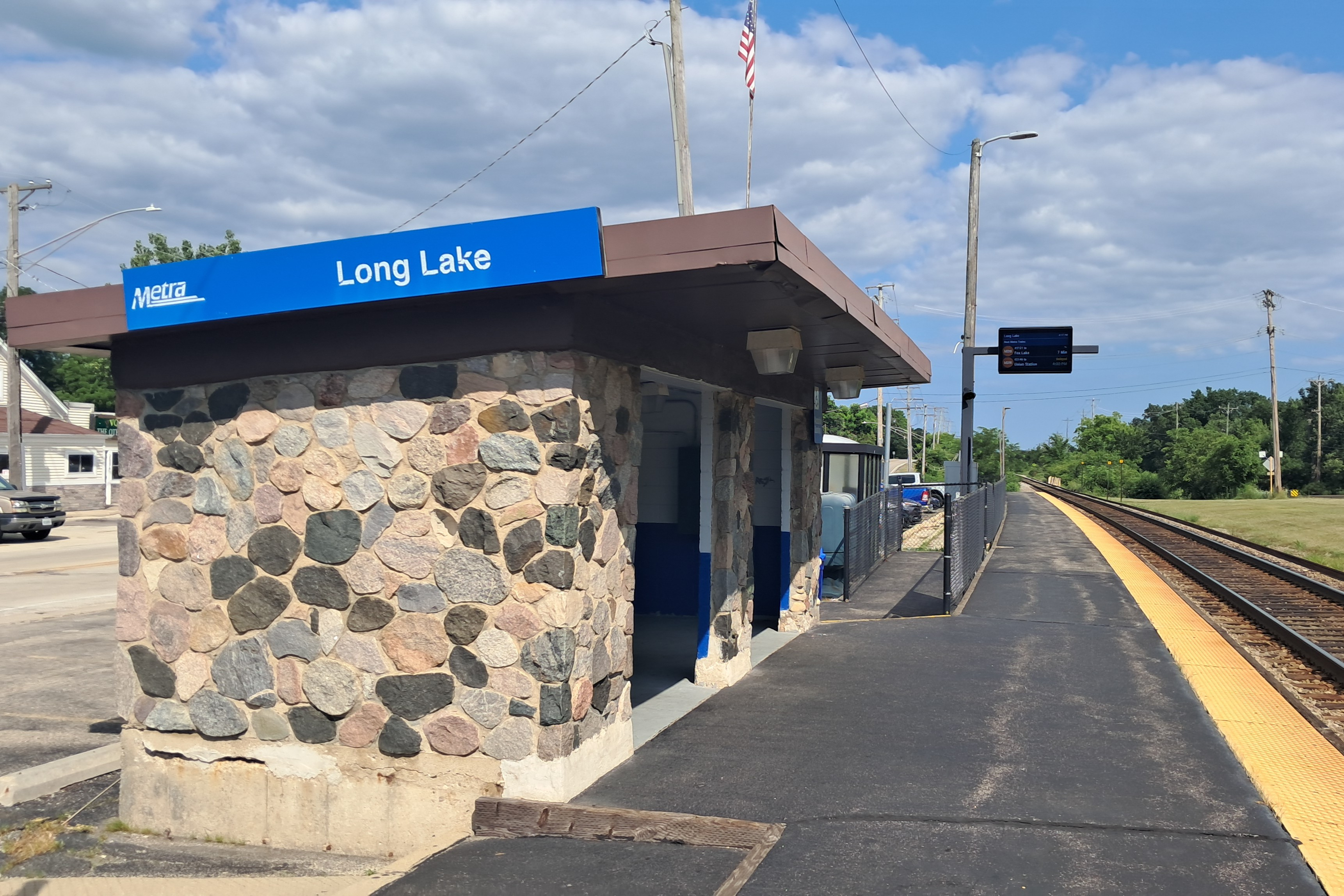
- Long Lake station in July 2026

General information
- Location: Decorah Avenue and Route 134; Long Lake, Illinois
- Coordinates: 42.3679°N 88.1280°W
- Owner: Metra
- Line: Fox Lake Subdivision
- Platforms: 1 side platform
- Tracks: 1

Construction
- Parking: Yes
- Accessible: Yes

Other information
- Fare zone: 4

History
- Rebuilt: 1992

Passengers
- 2018: 93 (average weekday) ▼3.1%
- Rank: 192 out of 236

Services
Preceding station	Metra	Following station
Ingleside toward Fox Lake	Milwaukee District North	Round Lake toward Union Station
Former services
Preceding station	Milwaukee Road	Following station
Ingleside toward Madison	Madison – Rondout	Round Lake toward Rondout
Wilson Road toward Walworth	Suburban Service North Line	Round Lake toward Chicago
Preceding station	Metra	Following station
Wilson Road closed 1984 toward Fox Lake	Milwaukee District North	Round Lake toward Union Station
Track layout
Location

Long Lake is a commuter railroad station on Metra's Milwaukee District North Line in Long Lake, Illinois. The station is located at Decorah Avenue and IL 134; is 46.1 miles (74.2 km) away from Chicago Union Station, the southern terminus of the line; and serves commuters between Union Station and Fox Lake, Illinois. In Metra's zone-based fare system, Long Lake is in zone four. As of 2018, Long Lake was the 192nd busiest of Metra's 236 non-downtown stations, with an average of 93 weekday boardings. Long Lake station is a stone covered shelter with a parking lot on Main Street and Decorah Avenue.

As of February 15, 2024, Long Lake is served (mainly as a flag stop) by 27 trains (12 inbound, 15 outbound) on weekdays; by 18 trains (nine in each direction) on Saturdays; and by all 18 trains (nine in each direction) on Sundays and holidays.
