= Grayslake station =

Commuter rail station in Grayslake, Illinois

Grayslake

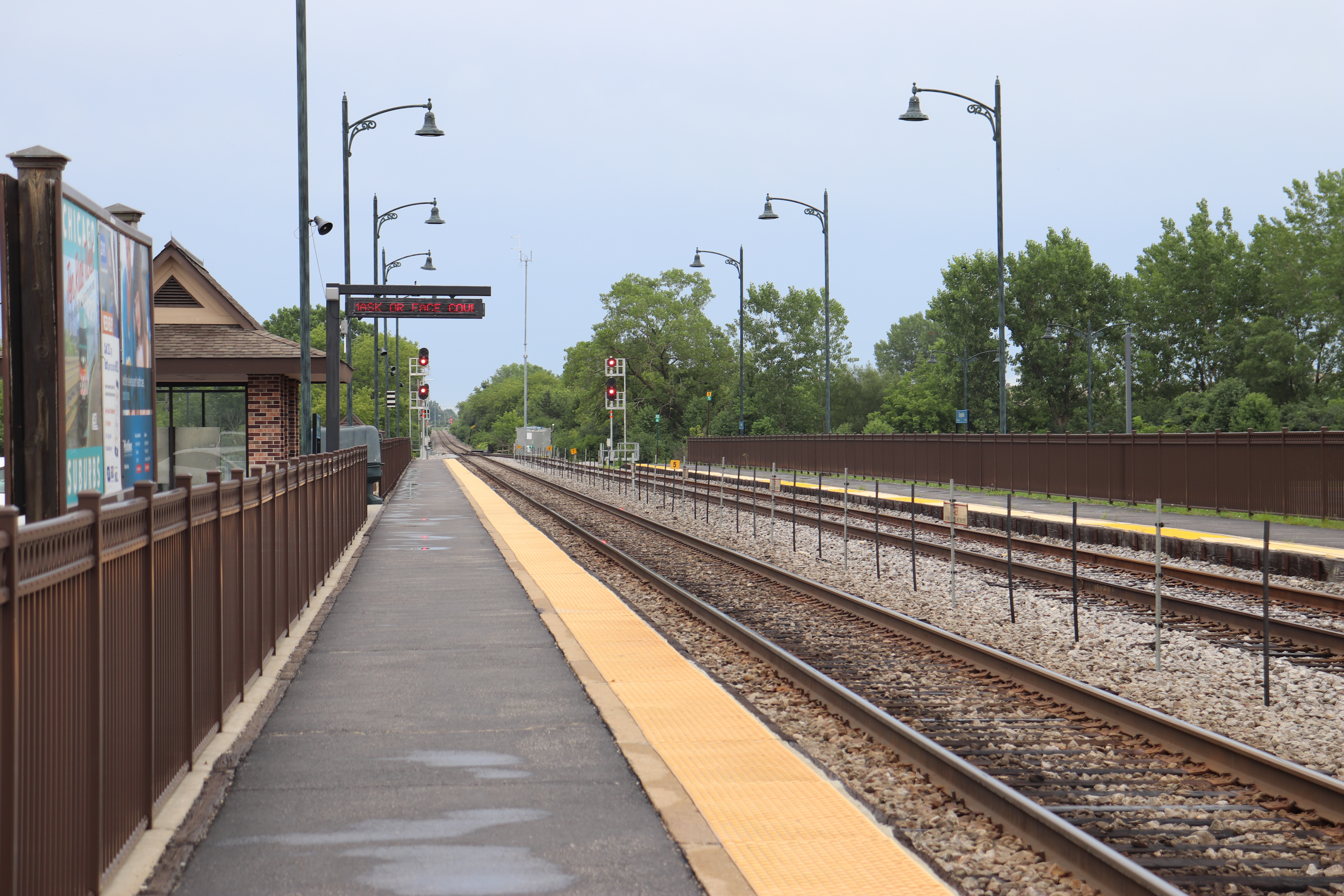

General information
- Location: Lake Street & Saint Paul Street; Grayslake, Illinois
- Coordinates: 42.3337°N 88.0433°W
- Owner: Village of Grayslake
- Line: Fox Lake Subdivision
- Platforms: 2 side platforms
- Tracks: 2
- Connections: Pace Bus

Construction
- Parking: Yes
- Accessible: Yes

Other information
- Fare zone: 4

History
- Opened: 1895
- Rebuilt: 1974, 2013

Passengers
- 2018: 470 (average weekday) ▼4.9%
- Rank: 103 out of 236

Services
Preceding station	Metra	Following station
Round Lake toward Fox Lake	Milwaukee District North	Prairie Crossing toward Union Station
Former services
Preceding station	Milwaukee Road	Following station
Round Lake toward Madison	Madison – Rondout	Libertyville toward Rondout
Round Lake toward Walworth	Suburban Service North Line	Libertyville toward Chicago
Track layout
Location

Grayslake is a commuter railroad station on Metra's Milwaukee District North Line in Grayslake, Illinois. The station is located on the corner of Lake Street and Saint Paul Street, 41 miles (66 km) from Chicago Union Station, the southern terminus of the line, and serves commuters between Union Station and Fox Lake, Illinois. In Metra's zone-based fare system, Grayslake is in zone 4. As of 2018, Grayslake is the 103rd busiest of Metra's 236 non-downtown stations, with an average of 470 weekday boardings.

As of February 15, 2024, Grayslake is served by 37 trains (17 inbound, 20 outbound) on weekdays, by 18 trains (nine in each direction) on Saturdays, and by all 18 trains (nine in each direction) on Sundays and holidays. On weekdays, four inbound trains originate from here, and four outbound trains terminate here.

Parking is available on both sides of the tracks, along the east side of Lake Street, the south side of St. Paul Street, and north of the intersection of St. Paul and Slusser Streets.

Grayslake is the only station on the Fox Lake Subdivision with two tracks and two platforms. Because of this, Grayslake is used as a passing siding to allow trains to pass, and to allow a few midday trains to terminate here. Another Metra station in Grayslake is located on the North Central Service at Washington Street. No connection is available to Washington Street station, but the two lines do connect at Prairie Crossing.

== Bus connections ==
Pace

- 570 Fox Lake-CLC
