= Lake Cook Road station =

Commuter rail station in Deerfield, Illinois, US

Lake Cook Road

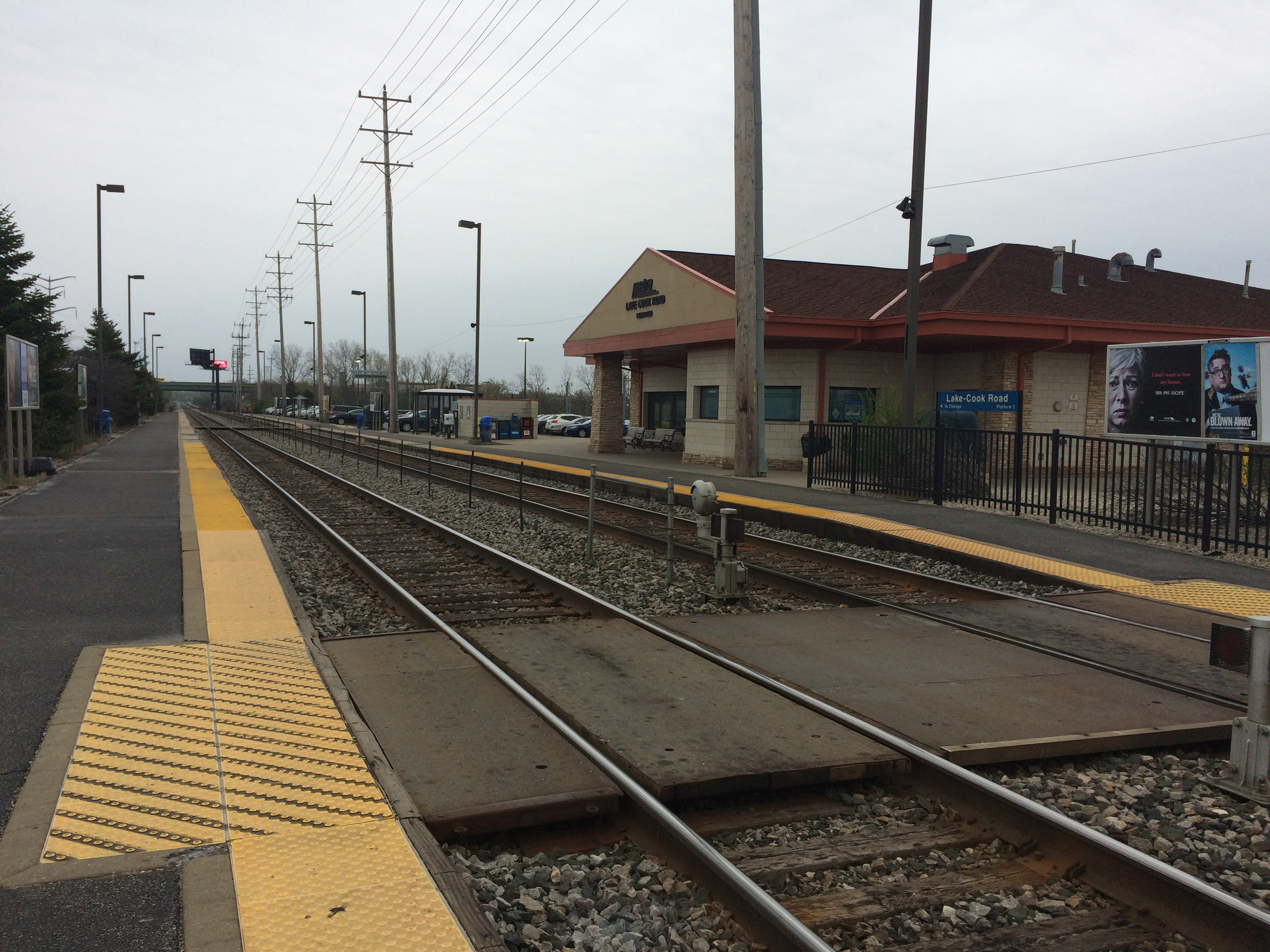

General information
- Location: 601 Lake Cook Road; Deerfield, Illinois
- Coordinates: 42.1518°N 87.8413°W
- Owner: Metra
- Line: C&M Subdivision
- Platforms: 2 side platforms
- Tracks: 2
- Connections: Pace Bus

Construction
- Platform levels: 1
- Parking: Yes
- Accessible: Yes

Other information
- Fare zone: 3

History
- Opened: 1996

Passengers
- 2018: 1,086 (average weekday) ▼14.6%
- Rank: 43 out of 236

Services
Preceding station	Metra	Following station
Deerfield toward Fox Lake	Milwaukee District North	Northbrook toward Union Station
Track layout
Location

Lake Cook Road (also known as Lake Cook) is a Metra station along the Milwaukee District North Line. It is located at 601 Lake Cook Road in Deerfield, Illinois, is 23.4 miles (37.7 km) away from Chicago Union Station, the southern terminus of the line, and serves commuters between Union Station and Fox Lake, Illinois. In Metra's zone-based fare system, Lake Cook Road is in zone 3. As of 2018, Lake Cook Road is the 43rd busiest of Metra's 236 non downtown stations, with an average of 1,086 weekday boardings. The station exists along a railroad line that originally served the Chicago, Milwaukee, St. Paul and Pacific Railroad. It is the last stop outbound on the line inside Cook County. The station opened in January 1996 as an infill station.

As of May 1, 2026, Lake Cook Road is served by 44 trains (22 inbound, 22 outbound) on weekdays, by all 20 trains (10 in each direction) on Saturdays, and by all 18 trains (nine in each direction) on Sundays and holidays.

Unlike the historic Deerfield station, Lake Cook Road is somewhat more modern-looking. Despite classic features, it contains far more contemporary paint trim and a "Metra" sign over the front doorway, rather than anything from the old Milwaukee Road. Parking is available along the west side of the tracks through a frontage road along Lake Cook Road leading to the intersection of Deerlake Road. This is due to the railroad bridge over Lake Cook Road. The parking lot also contains a section strictly for Pace buses. The station is across the tracks from some shopping centers at the corner of Lake Cook Road and Waukegan Road and is in close proximity to Interstate 94 west of the IL 43 partial interchange.

== Bus connections ==
Pace

- 626 Skokie - Buffalo Grove Limited (Weekday Rush Hours Only)
