= Grayland station =

Commuter rail station in Chicago, Illinois

Grayland

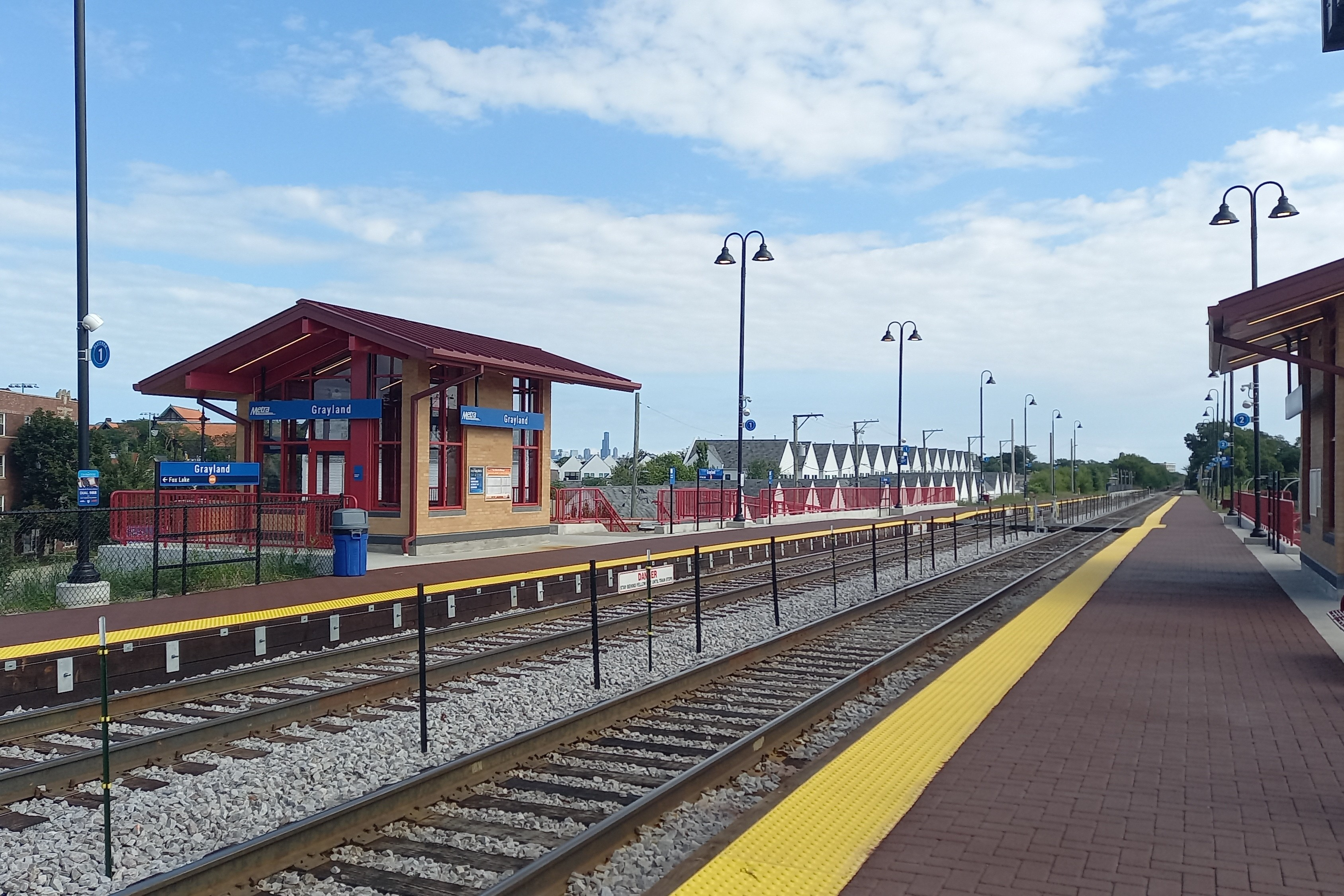
- Grayland station platforms and shelters, August 2025

General information
- Location: 3729 North Kilbourn Avenue; Chicago, Illinois 60641
- Coordinates: 41.9488°N 87.7405°W
- Line: C&M Subdivision
- Platforms: 2 side platforms
- Tracks: 2
- Connections: CTA Bus

Construction
- Structure type: Open shelter
- Parking: Yes
- Accessible: Yes

Other information
- Fare zone: 2

History
- Opened: 1873
- Rebuilt: 2021–2025

Passengers
- 2018: 357 (average weekday) ▲5.3%
- Rank: 132 out of 236

Services
Preceding station	Metra	Following station
Mayfair toward Fox Lake	Milwaukee District North	Healy toward Union Station
Former services
Preceding station	Milwaukee Road	Following station
Mayfair toward Milwaukee	Chicago – Milwaukee	Healy toward Chicago
Mayfair toward Walworth	Suburban Service North Line	Healy toward Chicago
Track layout
Location

Grayland is a Metra commuter railroad station in the Old Irving Park neighborhood in Chicago, Illinois, along the Milwaukee District North Line. It is located at 3729 North Kilbourn Avenue, is 8.2 miles (13.2 km) away from Chicago Union Station, the southern terminus of the line, and serves commuters between Union Station and Fox Lake, Illinois. In Metra's zone-based fare system, Grayland is in zone 2. As of 2018, Grayland is the 132nd busiest of Metra's 236 non-downtown stations, with an average of 357 weekday boardings.

As of February 15, 2024, Grayland is served by 40 trains (19 inbound, 21 outbound) on weekdays, by all 20 trains (10 in each direction) on Saturdays, and by all 18 trains (nine in each direction) on Sundays and holidays.

The station is an open platform shelter situated just south of a junction with the abandoned Union Pacific Railroad ex-Chicago & North Western Weber Subdivision. Parking is available on Kilbourn Avenue along the west side of the tracks south of Milwaukee Avenue, and on-street parking is also available on Kilbourn Avenue along the east side of the tracks north of Milwaukee Avenue.

== History ==
Advertisement for Grayland Subdivision in Irving Park, Illinois, after subdivided in 1873; the street names changed later.

The station was opened in 1873 to service Grayland, at the time a suburb of Chicago (annexed in 1889) created by subdividing John Gray's farm. Gray deeded the land the already built depot was on to the Chicago, Milwaukee & St. Paul Railroad in return for a promise to maintain and service the depot, thus insuring that the inhabitants of Gray's subdivision would have easy transport to Chicago and back.

The station was rebuilt from 2021 to 2025 to lengthen platforms and add station accessibility. The adjacent overpass above Milwaukee Avenue was also rebuilt. Construction began in October 2021 and was originally scheduled to be completed by spring 2024. However, delays pushed the completion date to August 2025 at the cost of $40 million.

== Bus connections ==
CTA

- 56 Milwaukee
- 152 Addison (1 block south at Addison and Milwaukee Ave.)
