= Healy station =

Commuter rail station in Chicago, Illinois

Healy

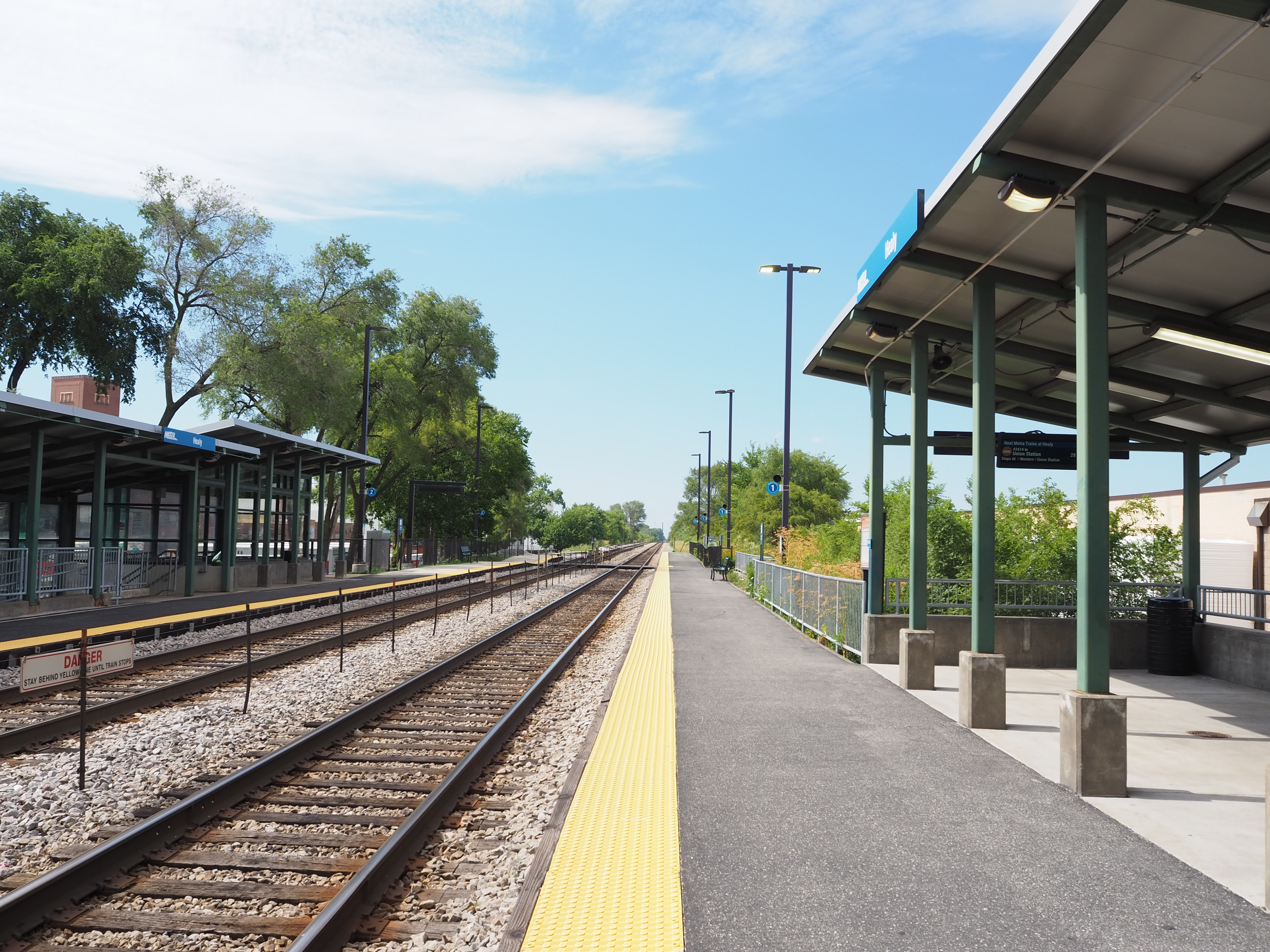
- Healy station in June 2024

General information
- Location: 4014 West Fullerton Avenue; Chicago, Illinois 60639
- Coordinates: 41.9248°N 87.7280°W
- Line: C&M Subdivision
- Platforms: 2 side platforms
- Tracks: 2
- Connections: CTA Buses

Construction
- Accessible: Yes

Other information
- Fare zone: 2

History
- Opened: 1876
- Rebuilt: 2017
- Former names: Pennock

Passengers
- 2018: 323 (average weekday) ▼6.4%
- Rank: 140 out of 236

Services
Preceding station	Metra	Following station
Grayland toward Fox Lake	Milwaukee District North	Western Avenue toward Union Station
Former services
Preceding station	Milwaukee Road	Following station
Grayland toward Milwaukee	Chicago – Milwaukee	Western Avenue toward Chicago
Grayland toward Walworth	Suburban Service North Line	Western Avenue toward Chicago
Track layout
Location

Healy is a station on Metra's Milwaukee District North Line in the Hermosa community area of Chicago, Illinois. The station is 6.4 miles (10.3 km) away from Chicago Union Station, the southern terminus of the line. In Metra's zone-based fare system, Healy is in zone 2. As of 2018, Healy is the 140th busiest of Metra's 236 non-downtown stations, with an average of 323 weekday boardings. It is just south of the factories of Newly Weds Foods. The station is named after the Lyon & Healy Harps, Inc., a world-renowned harp manufacturer founded in Chicago in 1864 by George W. Lyon and Patrick J. Healy. Now headquartered on Ogden Avenue, the company was located near the station at 4014 West Fullerton Avenue until 1914.

Street-side parking is only available on the north side of West Fullerton Avenue just west of where it runs beneath the tracks. A freight spur exists north of the station.

On May 8, 2017, Metra broke ground on a major renovation of Healy station, including new platforms, heated shelters, improved access for the disabled, and LED lighting. The makeover was planned to cost $7.3 million and expected to increase ridership given the station's close proximity to the 606 Trail.

As of February 15, 2024, Healy is served by 40 trains (19 inbound, 21 outbound) on weekdays, by all 20 trains (10 in each direction) on Saturdays, and by all 18 trains (nine in each direction) on Sundays and holidays.

== Bus connections ==
CTA

- 53 Pulaski (Owl Service)
- 74 Fullerton
