= Ingleside station =

Commuter rail station in Ingleside, Illinois

Ingleside

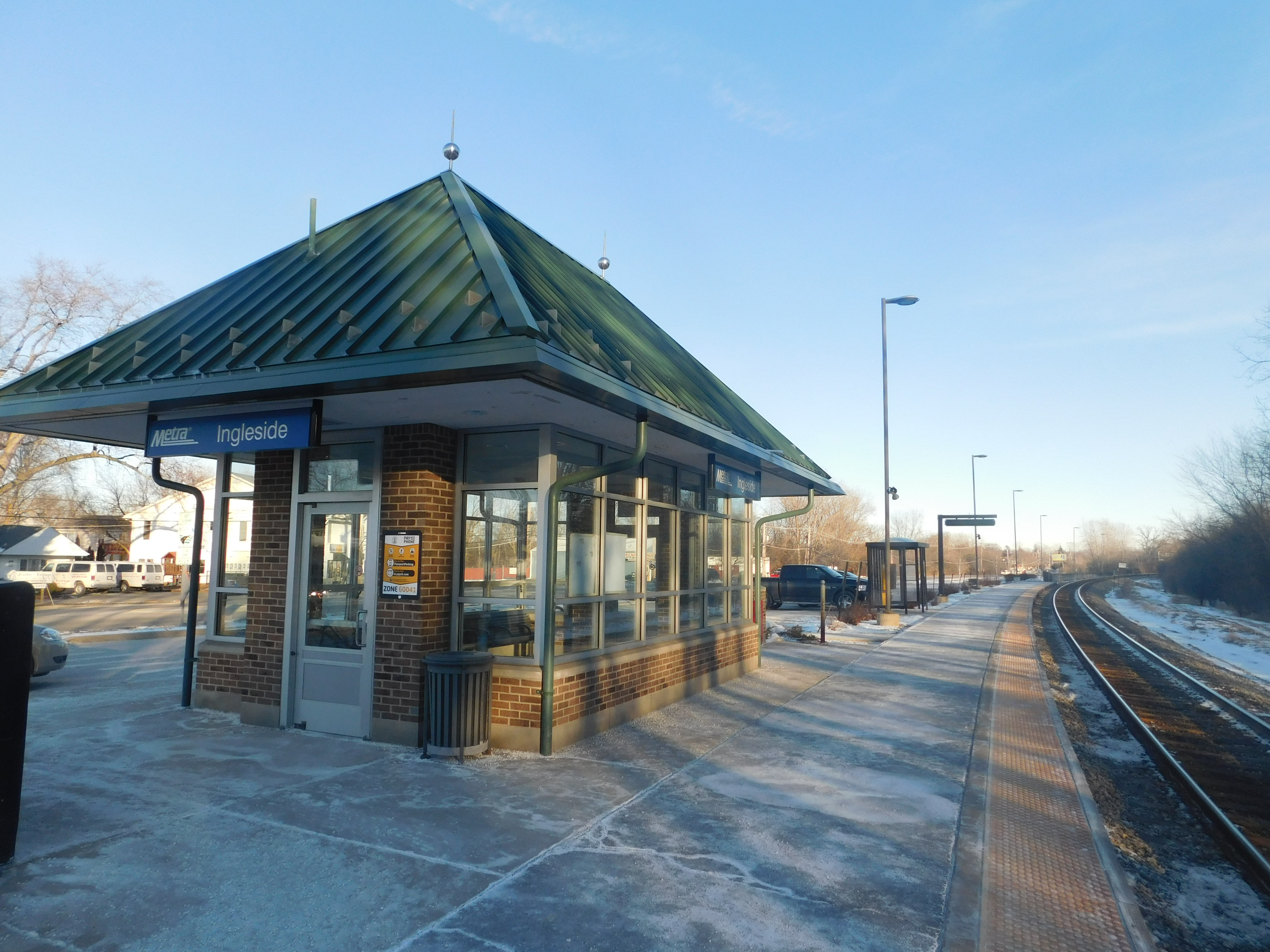
- Ingleside station in February 2016

General information
- Location: Washington Street and Rollins Road; Ingleside, Illinois
- Coordinates: 42.3838°N 88.1535°W
- Owner: Metra
- Line: Fox Lake Subdivision
- Platforms: 1 side platform
- Tracks: 1
- Connections: Pace Bus

Construction
- Parking: Yes
- Accessible: Yes

Other information
- Fare zone: 4

History
- Rebuilt: 1997

Passengers
- 2018: 63 (average weekday) ▼14.9%
- Rank: 205 out of 236

Services
Preceding station	Metra	Following station
Fox Lake Terminus	Milwaukee District North	Long Lake toward Union Station
Former services
Preceding station	Metra	Following station
Fox Lake Terminus	Milwaukee District North	Wilson Road closed 1984 toward Union Station
Preceding station	Milwaukee Road	Following station
Fox Lake, IL toward Madison	Madison – Rondout	Long Lake toward Rondout
Fox Lake, IL toward Walworth	Suburban Service North Line	Wilson Road toward Chicago
Track layout
Location

Ingleside is the penultimate commuter railroad station along Metra's Milwaukee District North Line in Ingleside, Illinois. The station is officially located on Washington Street and Rollins Road (Lake County Roads 31 and A20), however the actual location is off of Rollins Road itself. The station is 47.8 miles (76.9 km) away from Chicago Union Station, the southern terminus of the line, and serves commuters between Union Station and nearby Fox Lake, Illinois. In Metra's zone-based fare system, Ingleside is in zone 4. As of 2018, Ingleside is the 205th busiest of Metra's 236 non-downtown stations, with an average of 63 weekday boardings. The station exists along a railroad line that originally served the Chicago, Milwaukee, St. Paul and Pacific Railroad.

As of February 15, 2024, Ingleside is served as a flag stop by 27 trains (12 inbound, 15 outbound) on weekdays, by 18 trains (nine in each direction) on Saturdays, and by all 18 trains (nine in each direction) on Sundays and holidays.

Ingleside station is little more than an enclosed shelter. Parking is available along the north side of the tracks on the southeast corner of Jefferson Avenue and Rollins Road to a plot of land that is in line with Madison Avenue, a street that dead ends north of Rollins Road. Washington Street merely intersects with Rollins Road and the main parking lot entrance. The station is near locations such as Duck Lake and Fox Lake Veterans Memorial Park.

== Bus connections ==
Pace

- 570 Fox Lake-CLC
