= Golf station =

Commuter rail station in Golf, Illinois

Golf

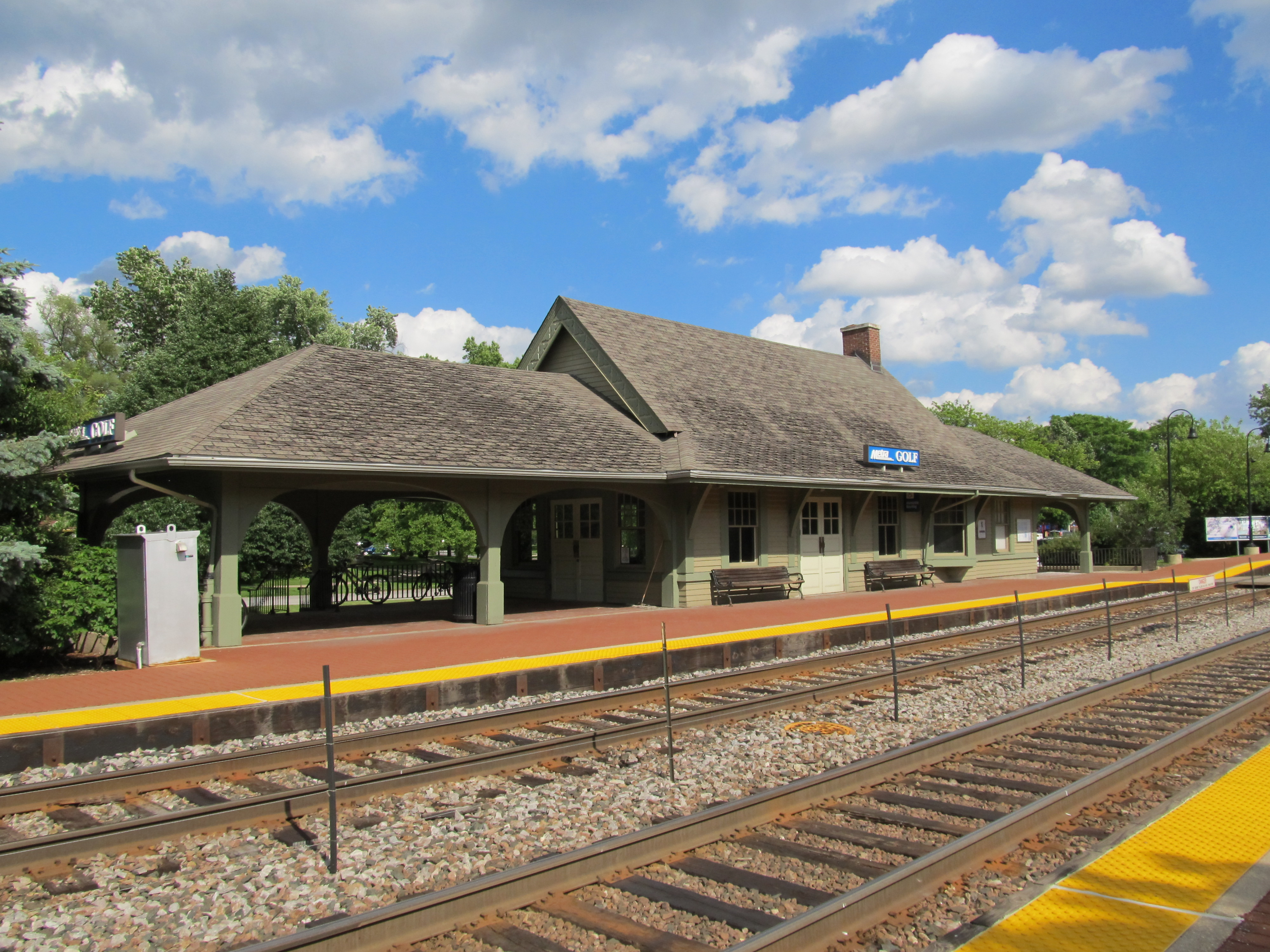

General information
- Location: 1 Overlook Drive; Golf, Illinois 60029
- Coordinates: 42.0583°N 87.7971°W
- Owner: Metra
- Line: C&M Subdivision
- Platforms: 2 side platforms
- Tracks: 2
- Connections: Pace Bus

Construction
- Parking: Yes
- Cycle facilities: Yes
- Accessible: Yes

Other information
- Fare zone: 3

History
- Opened: 1903

Passengers
- 2018: 355 (average weekday) ▼5.3%
- Rank: 133 out of 236

Services
Preceding station	Metra	Following station
Glenview toward Fox Lake	Milwaukee District North	Morton Grove toward Union Station
Former services
Preceding station	Milwaukee Road	Following station
Glenview toward Milwaukee	Chicago – Milwaukee	Morton Grove toward Chicago
Glenview toward Walworth	Suburban Service North Line	Morton Grove toward Chicago
Track layout
Location

Golf is a commuter railroad station on Metra's Milwaukee District North Line in Golf, Illinois. The station is located at 1 Overlook Drive, 15.4 miles (24.8 km) away from Chicago Union Station, the southern terminus of the line. It serves commuters between Union Station and Fox Lake, Illinois, and in Metra's zone-based fare system, Golf is in zone 3. As of 2018, Golf is the 133rd busiest of Metra's 236 non-downtown stations, with an average of 355 weekday boardings. The station also houses the Golf Police Department.

As of February 15, 2024, Golf is served by 40 trains (19 inbound, 21 outbound) on weekdays, by all 20 trains (10 in each direction) on Saturdays, and by all 18 trains (nine in each direction) on Sundays and holidays.

Golf station was originally built in 1903 by the Chicago, Milwaukee, St. Paul and Pacific Railroad. Parking is available south of Overlook Drive and Briar Road, near Deideich Park.

== Bus connections ==
Pace

- 208 Golf Road (2 blocks south of Overlook Drive)
- 210 Lincoln Avenue (Weekdays Only)
