= Morton Grove station =

Commuter rail station in Morton Grove, Illinois

Morton Grove

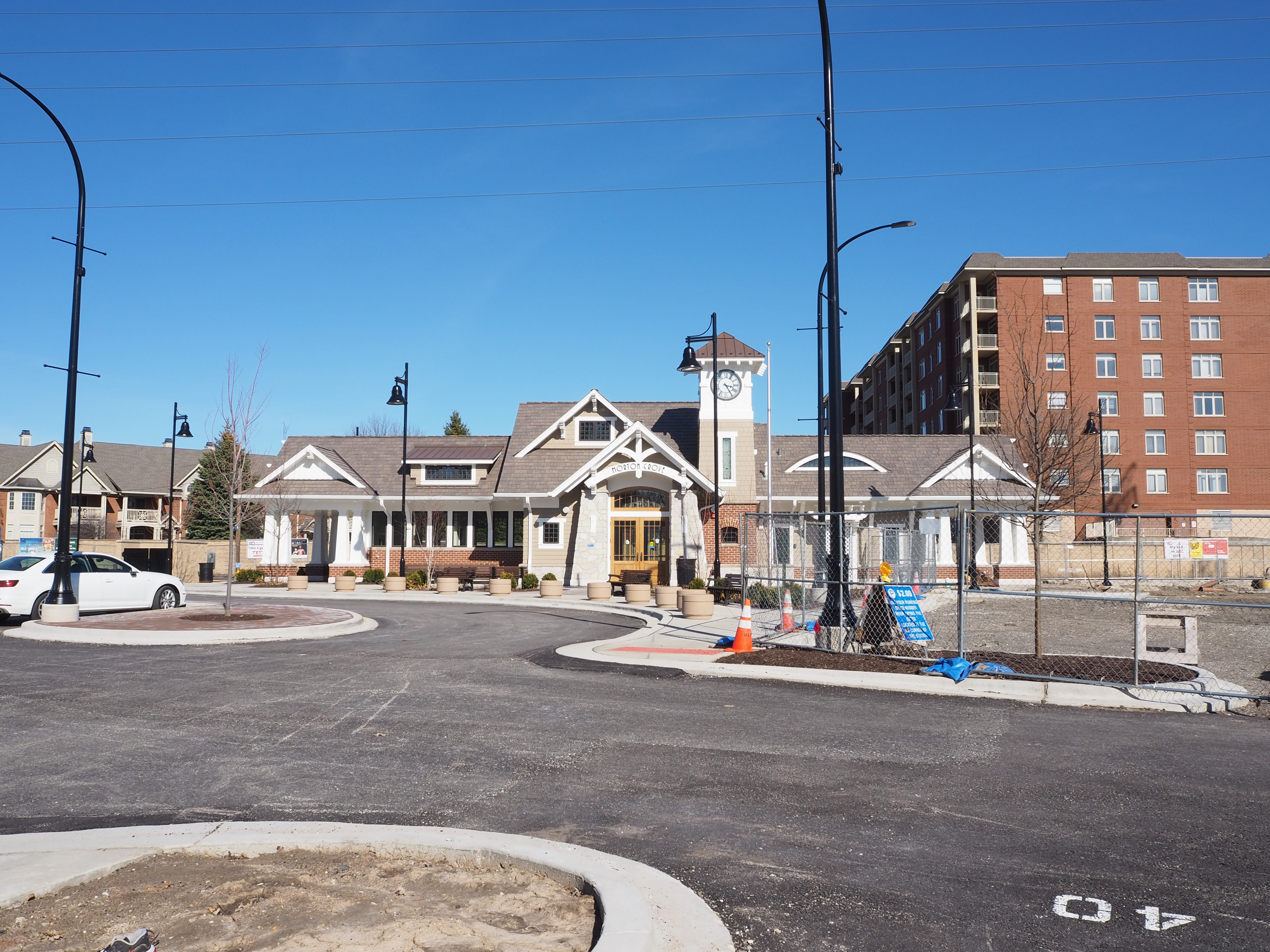

General information
- Location: 8501 Lehigh Avenue; Morton Grove, Illinois 60053
- Coordinates: 42.0350°N 87.7852°W
- Owner: Metra
- Line: C&M Subdivision
- Platforms: 2 side platforms
- Tracks: 2
- Connections: Pace Bus

Construction
- Parking: Yes
- Accessible: Yes

Other information
- Fare zone: 2

History
- Opened: 1892
- Rebuilt: 1976

Passengers
- 2018: 967 (average weekday) ▼0.2%
- Rank: 54 out of 236

Services
Preceding station	Metra	Following station
Golf toward Fox Lake	Milwaukee District North	Edgebrook toward Union Station
Former services
Preceding station	Milwaukee Road	Following station
Golf toward Milwaukee	Chicago – Milwaukee	Edgebrook toward Chicago
Golf toward Walworth	Suburban Service North Line	Edgebrook toward Chicago
Track layout
Location

Morton Grove is a commuter railroad station on Metra's Milwaukee District North Line in Morton Grove, Illinois. The station is located at 8501 Lehigh Ave., is 14.6 miles (23.5 km) away from Chicago Union Station, the southern terminus of the line, and serves commuters between Union Station and Fox Lake, Illinois. In Metra's zone-based fare system, Morton Grove is in zone 2. As of 2018, Morton Grove is the 54th busiest of Metra's 236 non-downtown stations, with an average of 967 weekday boardings. Parking is available in front of the station, as well as along the side of sections Lehigh Avenue and Elm Street from Lehigh to the dead end at St. Paul Woods, part of the Cook County Forest Preserve. As of July 15, 2024, Morton Grove is served by all 54 trains (27 in each direction) on weekdays, by all 20 trains (10 in each direction) on Saturdays, and by all 18 trains (nine in each direction) on Sundays and holidays.

Morton Grove station was originally built by the Chicago, Milwaukee, St. Paul and Pacific Railroad in 1892. On July 25, 2023, the Village Board of Morton Grove approved a resolution allowing demolition and replacement of the 1976-built train station. The Village would provide $50,000 to the $2.5 million project, also partially funded by Metra. The demolition would be withheld until construction is completed on the new depot.

== Bus connections ==
Pace

- 210 Lincoln Avenue (Weekdays only)
- 250 Dempster Street (2 blocks north on Ferris at Dempster)
