= Lake Forest station (Milwaukee District) =

Commuter rail station in Lake Forest, Illinois

Lake Forest

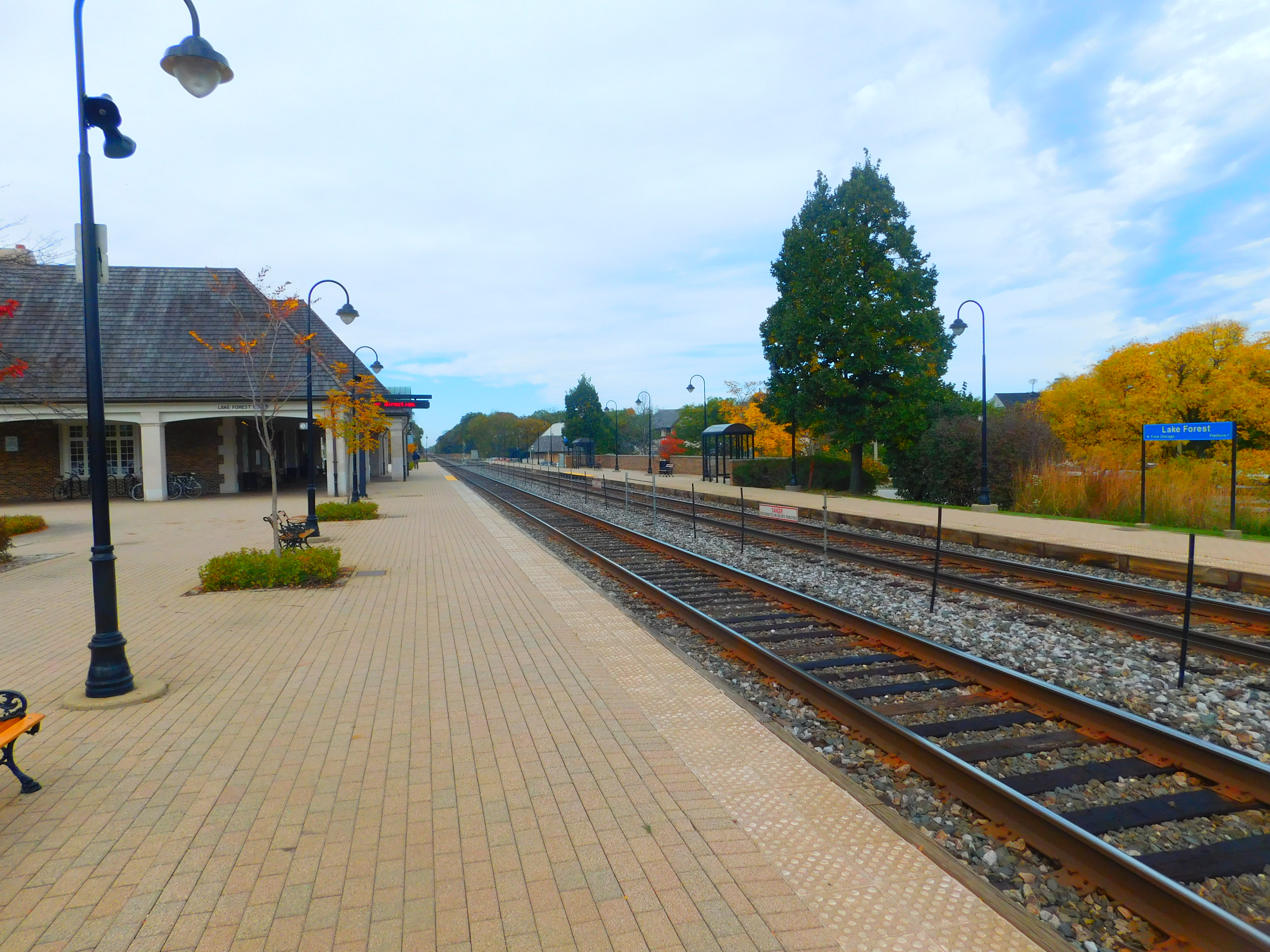
- Lake Forest station in October 2015, before the platforms were rebuilt

General information
- Location: 911 Telegraph Road; Lake Forest, Illinois
- Coordinates: 42.2236°N 87.8747°W
- Owner: Metra
- Line: C&M Subdivision
- Platforms: 2 side platforms
- Tracks: 2

Construction
- Parking: Yes
- Accessible: Yes

Other information
- Fare zone: 4

History
- Opened: 1875
- Former names: Everett

Passengers
- 2018: 607 (average weekday) ▲10.8%
- Rank: 82 out of 236

Services
Preceding station	Metra	Following station
Libertyville toward Fox Lake	Milwaukee District North	Deerfield toward Union Station
Former services
Preceding station	Metra	Following station
Rondout closed 1984 toward Fox Lake	Milwaukee District North	Deerfield toward Union Station
Preceding station	Milwaukee Road	Following station
Rondout toward Milwaukee	Chicago – Milwaukee	Deerfield toward Chicago
Rondout toward Walworth	Suburban Service North Line	Deerfield toward Chicago
Track layout
Location

Lake Forest is a railroad station in Lake Forest, Illinois, served by Metra's Milwaukee District North Line. The station is located on 10205 North Waukegan Road (IL 43), and is 28.4 miles (45.7 km) away from Chicago Union Station, the southern terminus of the line. In Metra's zone-based fare system, Lake Forest is in zone 4. As of 2018, Lake Forest is the 82nd busiest of Metra's 236 non-downtown stations, with an average of 607 weekday boardings.

As of February 15, 2024, Lake Forest is served by 45 trains (21 inbound, 24 outbound) on weekdays, by all 20 trains (10 in each direction) on Saturdays, and by all 18 trains (nine in each direction) on Sundays and holidays.

Four inbound trains originate here, and four outbound trains terminate here, on weekdays. Additionally, one inbound train originates from here with one outbound train terminating here on Saturdays.

Another Lake Forest station exists along the Union Pacific North Line east of this station. Therefore, this station is sometimes referred to as West Lake Forest to differentiate the two. No bus connections exist here, nor is there any connection to the East Lake Forest station. However parking is available along Telegraph Road along the west side of the tracks, and the station is accessible from North Waukegan Road through Settler's Square on the east side of the tracks.

Lake Forest is the northernmost Metra station to be located on the C&M Subdivision, and serves as an emergency stop for Amtrak's Empire Builder, Borealis, and Hiawatha trains. Since 2010, Amtrak has had plans for its Hiawatha trains to stop at Lake Forest, but as of 2026 has yet to come to fruition. Metra has proposed the construction of crossovers at Lake Forest to make the station better suited to turning trains around.
