= Lake Villa =

Lake Villa may refer to the following places in the United States:

- Lake Villa, Illinois, a village
  - Lake Villa station
- Lake Villa Township, Illinois
