= Prairie Crossing station =

Commuter rail stations in Libertyville, Illinois

Prairie Crossing Libertyville

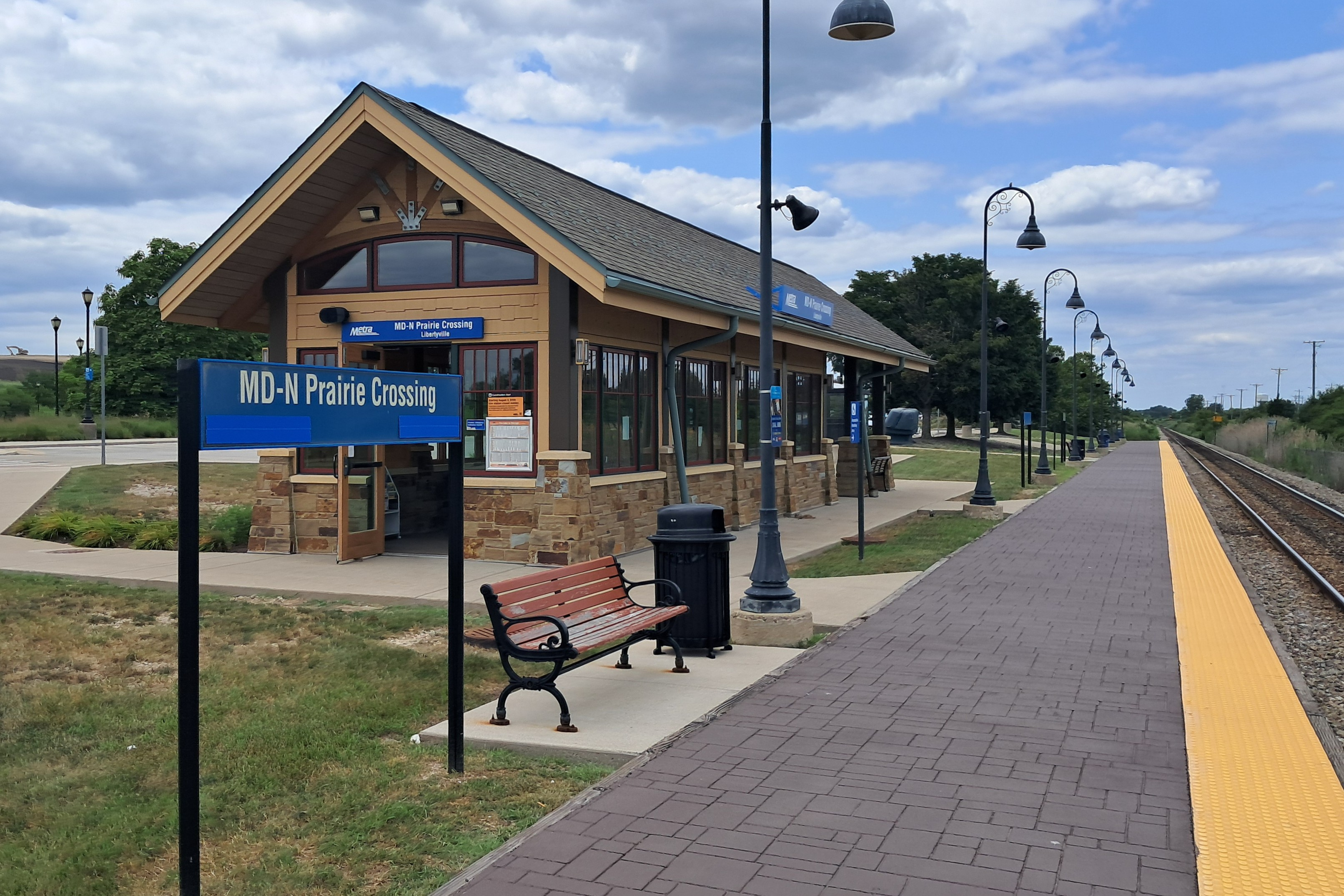
- The Milwaukee District North Line platform in July 2026

General information
- Location: 2401 Midlothian Road (NCS); 3001 Midlothian Road (MDN); Libertyville, Illinois
- Coordinates: 42.3184°N 88.0176°W
- Owner: Metra
- Lines: Fox Lake Subdivision (MDN); Waukesha Subdivision (NCS)
- Platforms: 1 side platform (NCS) 1 side platform (MDN)
- Tracks: 1 (NCS) 1 (MDN)

Construction
- Parking: Yes
- Accessible: Yes

Other information
- Fare zone: 4

History
- Opened: August 19, 1996

Passengers
- 2018: 368 (avg. weekday) ▼12.8% (MDN)
- Rank: 128 out of 236 (MDN)
- 2018: 87 (avg. weekday) ▼14.7% (NCS)
- Rank: 194 out of 236 (NCS)

Services
Preceding station	Metra	Following station
Washington Street toward Antioch	North Central Service	Mundelein toward Union Station
Grayslake toward Fox Lake	Milwaukee District North	Libertyville toward Union Station
Former services
Preceding station	Soo Line	Following station
Grays Lake toward Portal	Main Line	Mundelein toward Chicago
Track layout
Location

Prairie Crossing is a pair of Metra stations located in Libertyville, Illinois. They are serviced by the North Central Service and the Milwaukee District North Line. The station is 43.4 miles (69.8 km) away from Chicago Union Station via the North Central Service, and 39.8 miles (64.1 km) via the Milwaukee District North Line. In Metra's zone-based fare system, both Prairie Crossing platforms are in zone 4.

The North Central Service station opened first, in 1996, along with the rest of the line. The Milwaukee District North Line platform opened as an infill station in 2004. The two lines cross at an at-grade diamond northwest of the station. A connector track is present at the diamond.

In terms of passenger boardings, Metra considers the Milwaukee District North Line and North Central Service platforms to be separate stations. The platforms are within walking distance of each other. As of 2018, the Milwaukee District North Line platform is considered to be the 128th busiest of Metra's 236 non-downtown stations, with an average of 368 weekday boardings. The North Central Service platform is considered to be the 194th busiest of Metra's 236 non-downtown stations, with an average of 87 weekday boardings.

On the Milwaukee District North Line, as of February 15, 2024, Prairie Crossing is served by 35 trains (16 inbound, 19 outbound) on weekdays, by 18 trains (nine in each direction) on Saturdays, and by all 18 trains (nine in each direction) on Sundays and holidays.

On the North Central Service, as of February 15, 2024, Prairie Crossing is served by 14 trains (seven in each direction) on weekdays.
