= Deerfield station =

Commuter rail station in Deerfield, Illinois

Deerfield

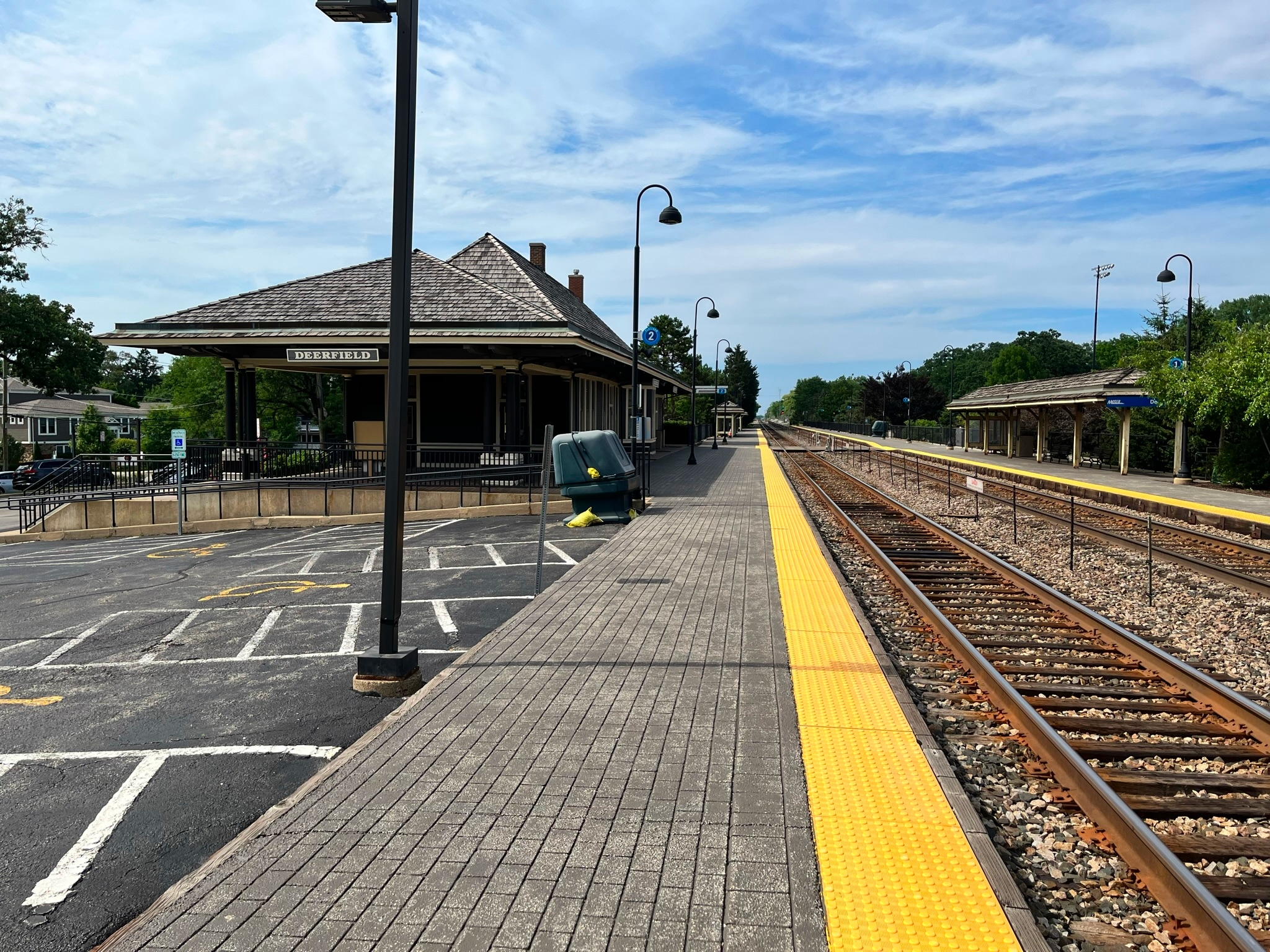
- Deerfield station in July 2022

General information
- Location: 860 Deerfield Road; Deerfield, Illinois
- Owner: Village of Deerfield
- Line: C&M Subdivision
- Platforms: 2 side platforms
- Tracks: 2
- Connections: Pace Buses

Construction
- Parking: On street
- Accessible: Yes

Other information
- Fare zone: 4

History
- Opened: 1872
- Rebuilt: 1900, 1917

Passengers
- 2018: 1,133 (average weekday) ▼11.6%
- Rank: 39 out of 236

Services
Preceding station	Metra	Following station
Lake Forest toward Fox Lake	Milwaukee District North	Lake Cook Road toward Union Station
Former services
Preceding station	Milwaukee Road	Following station
Sturtevant toward Seattle or Tacoma	Main Line	Western Avenue toward Chicago
West Lake Forest toward Milwaukee	Chicago – Milwaukee	Techny toward Chicago
West Lake Forest toward Walworth	Suburban Service North Line	Techny toward Chicago
- Chicago, Milwaukee and St. Paul Railway Passenger Depot
- U.S. National Register of Historic Places
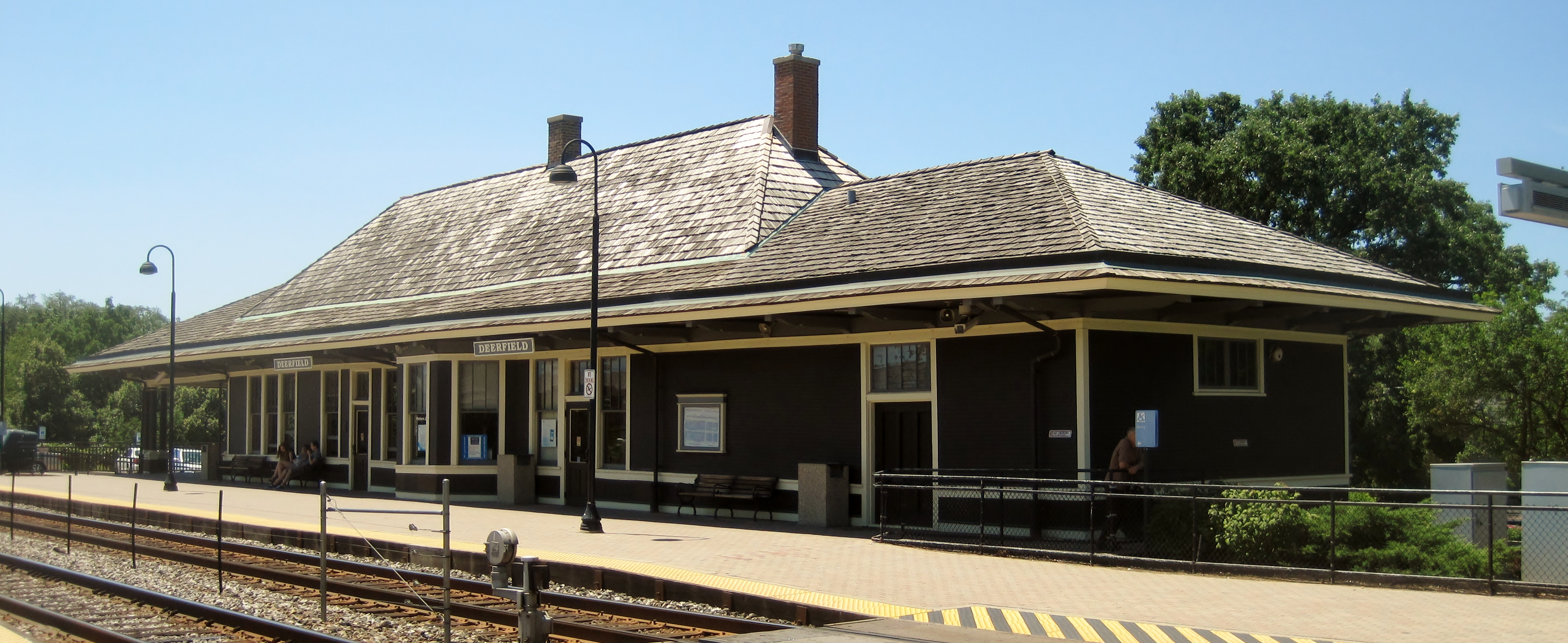
- Interactive map of Chicago, Milwaukee and St. Paul Railway Passenger Depot
- Location: Deerfield, Illinois, USA
- Coordinates: 42°10′05″N 87°51′00″W
- Built: 1917
- NRHP reference No.: 98000066
- Added to NRHP: February 5, 1998
Track layout
Location

Deerfield is one of two Metra commuter railroad stations in Deerfield, Illinois along the Milwaukee District North Line. It is located at 860 Deerfield Road, 2 blocks west of Illinois State Route 43, is 24.6 miles (39.6 km) away from Chicago Union Station, the southern terminus of the line. The station serves commuters between Union Station and Fox Lake, Illinois. As of 2018, Deerfield is the 39th busiest of Metra's 236 non-downtown stations, with an average of 1,133 weekday boardings. The current station originally served the Chicago, Milwaukee, St. Paul & Pacific Railroad, and replaced two older stations built by the railway.

As of July 15, 2024, all Milwaukee District North trains make a scheduled stop in Deerfield, including 54 trains (27 in each direction) on weekdays, 20 trains (10 in each direction) on Saturdays, and 18 trains (nine in each direction) on Sundays and holidays. On weekdays, one inbound train originates here, and one outbound train terminates here.

The commuter parking lot east of the station and tracks is the site of the Deerfield Farmer's Market, Saturday Mornings from June to October.

== History ==
The first train station in Deerfield was a temporary boxcar installed by the Milwaukee Road in 1872. Situated on Central Avenue, then called Hall Avenue, it was used as a temporary station while a permanent station was being constructed. The replacement structure was built about 2 blocks to the south of the current station and opened in 1872. The present station, which replaced both previous stations, was built in 1903 after a petition was circulated to have a train station closer to the center of the village. Architect Jay W. Nettenstrom designed the station using American Craftsman and Prairie-style principles. The station is similar in design to other stations along the Milwaukee Road, including the station in Walworth, Wisconsin.

In 1913, an underpass was built to the south of the station to allow Deerfield Road to flow under the tracks. The station caught on fire in 1917 with only the freight room surviving. The building was repaired and enlarged according to a new plan by architect Charles Rawson. The current station was built on the foundation of the 1903 station, and retains many features from when it was rebuilt after the fire, including historical double-hung windows and radiators.

In 1973, the Milwaukee Road had planned to tear down the station, along with five other stations in Northeastern Illinois, and replace it with a concrete shelter. This plan, though, was shelved in favor of a restoration due to public outcry. The Deerfield Area Historical Society created a plan to repair and rehab the station to prevent demolition. In 1974, the Village of Deerfield received $65,000 in federal funds to restore the station. The local Jaycees volunteered to paint and restore the station.

The station was added to the National Register of Historic Places on February 5, 1998.

=== No Kissing Zone ===
Deerfield station became nationally famous in 1979, when Deerfield village officials created a "No-Kissing Zone" at the station in response to complaints about traffic jams caused by couples taking too long to kiss their goodbyes at the drop-off point. The "No-Kissing" signs (patterned after international traffic signs) attracted national attention and were featured in Time magazine and ABC's AM America (precursor to Good Morning America). A Deerfield family appearing on the game show Family Feud presented Richard Dawson with replica pins of the signs. Despite this restriction, the station is shown in the 1983 Paul Brickman film Risky Business.

== Bus connections ==
Pace

- 471 Highland Park – Northbrook Court (Monday-Saturday only)
