= Round Lake Beach station =

Commuter rail station in Round Lake Beach, Illinois

Round Lake Beach

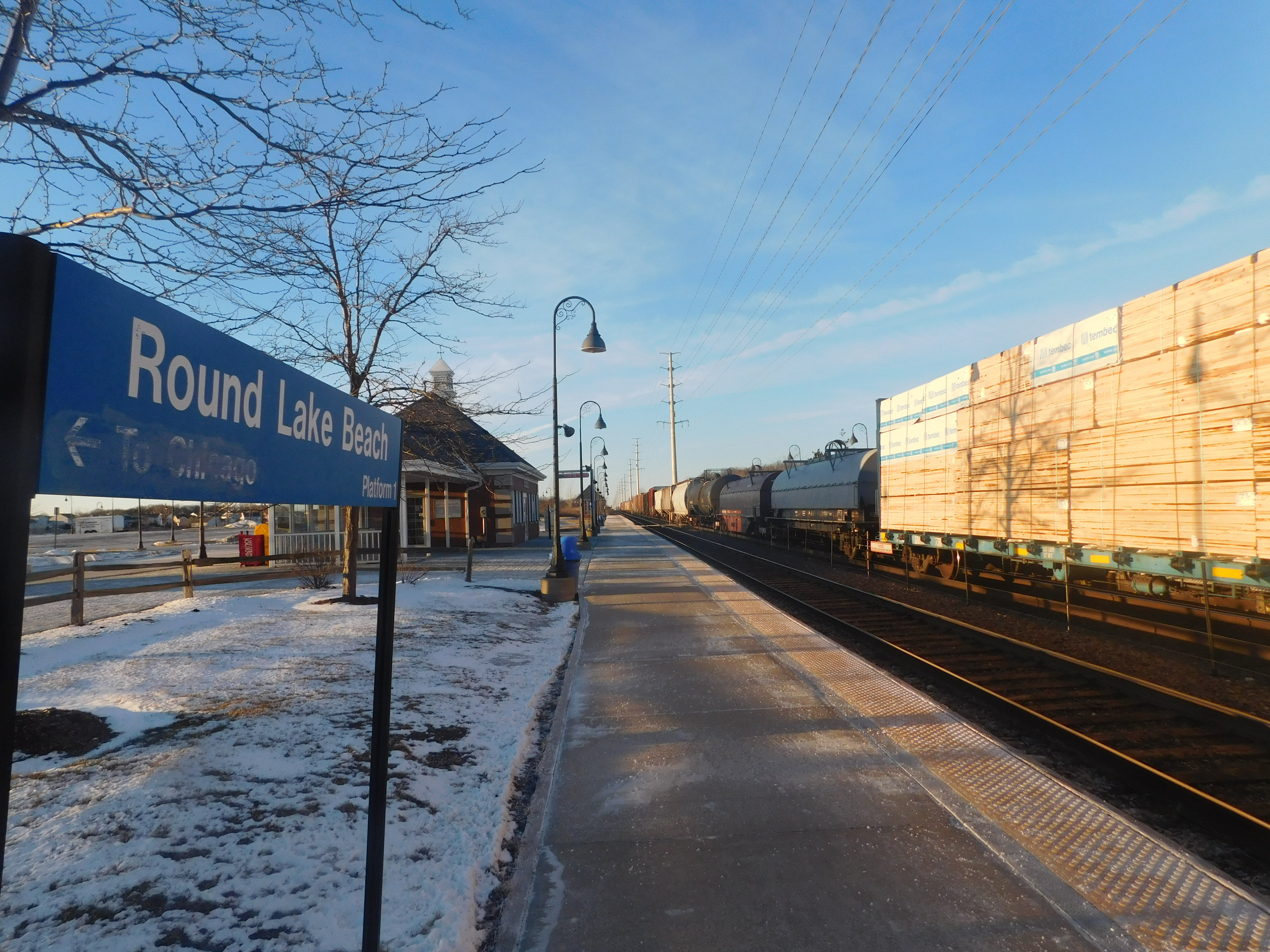
- Round Lake Beach station in February 2016, with a freight train passing

General information
- Location: 680 East Mallard Creek Drive; Round Lake Beach, Illinois
- Coordinates: 42.3851°N 88.0655°W
- Owner: Metra
- Line: CN Waukesha Subdivision
- Platforms: 2 side platforms
- Tracks: 2

Construction
- Accessible: Yes

Other information
- Fare zone: 4

History
- Opened: August 19, 1996

Passengers
- 2018: 111 (average weekday) ▼3.5%
- Rank: 184 out of 236

Services
Preceding station	Metra	Following station
Lake Villa toward Antioch	North Central Service	Washington Street toward Union Station
Track layout
Location

Round Lake Beach is a station on Metra's North Central Service in Round Lake Beach, Illinois. The station is 48.5 miles (78.1 km) away from Chicago Union Station, the southern terminus of the line. In Metra's zone-based fare system, Round Lake Beach is in zone 4. As of 2018, Round Lake Beach is the 184th busiest of Metra's 236 non-downtown stations, with an average of 111 weekday boardings.

Round Lake Beach station is a brick-and-stucco enclosed structure with a gabled roof, a cupola, and two glass-enclosed canopies on both sides. A 19th-century-style street light can be found next to the station in the parking lot.

As of February 15, 2024, Round Lake Beach is served by all 14 trains (seven in each direction) on weekdays.
