= Milwaukee District North Line =

Commuter rail service in Illinois

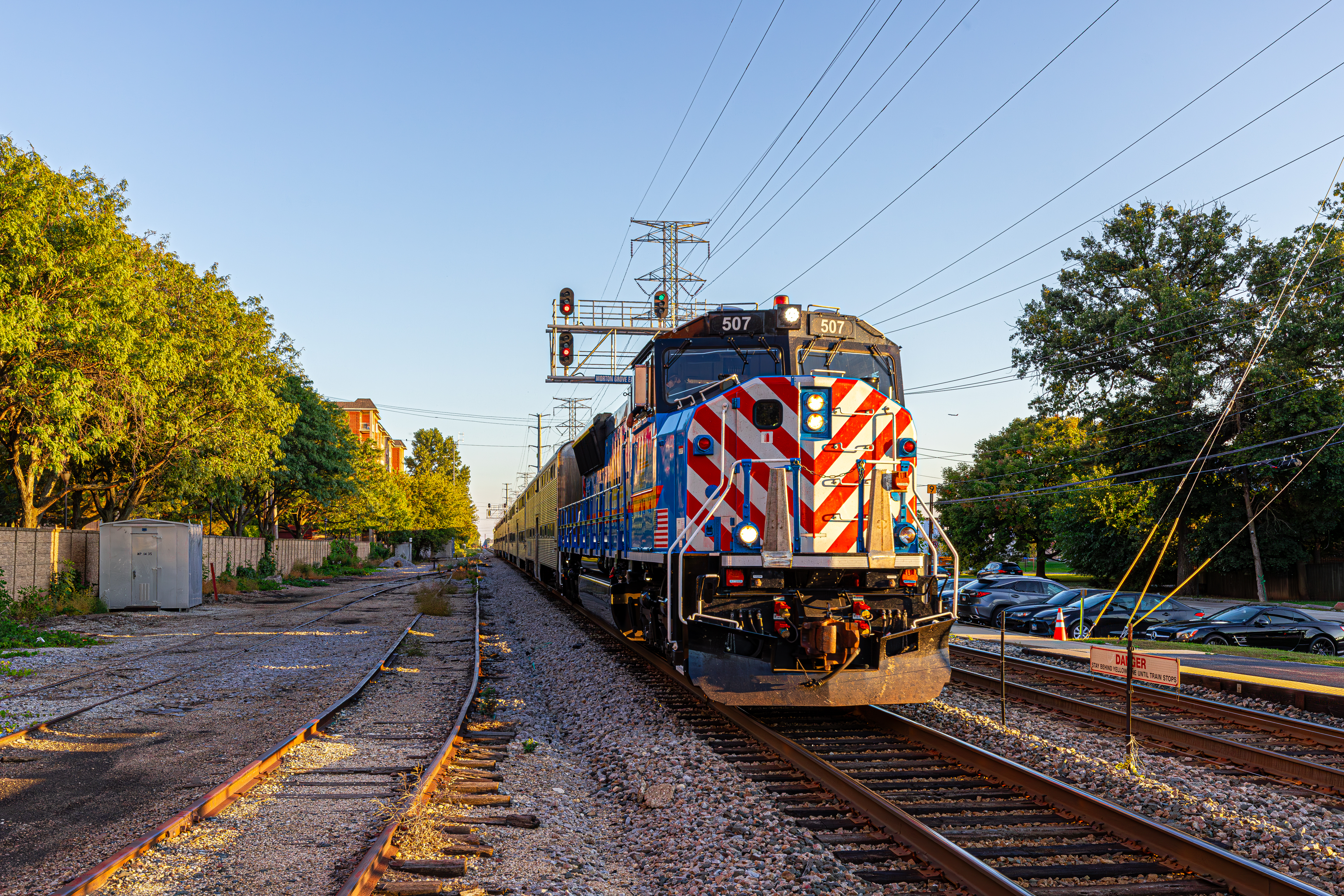
- An EMD SD70 leads an outbound train at Morton Grove

Overview
- Service type: Commuter rail
- Status: Operating
- Locale: Northern Chicago metropolitan area
- Predecessor: Milwaukee Road
- Current operator: Metra
- Ridership: 23,257 (Avg. Weekday 2014)
- Annual ridership: 3,478,934 (2025)
- Website: metra.com/train-lines/md-n

Route
- Termini: Union Station; Fox Lake
- Stops: 22
- Distance travelled: 49.7 miles (80.0 km)
- Average journey time: 97 minutes, stopping at all stops
- Lines used: C&M Subdivision, Fox Lake Subdivision

Technical
- Track gauge: 4 ft 8 1/2 in (1,435 mm) standard gauge
- Track owners: Metra (dispatched by Canadian Pacific Kansas City Railway between Rondout and Pacific Junction)
Route map
Milwaukee District North Line highlighted in orange
Key
- Mileage source All stations are accessible except Mayfair and Forest Glen.

The Milwaukee District North Line (MD-N) is a Metra commuter rail line in Chicago, Illinois and its northern suburbs, running from Union Station to Fox Lake. Although Metra does not refer to any of its lines by color, the timetable accents for the Milwaukee District North line are pale "Hiawatha Orange" in honor of the Milwaukee Road's Hiawatha passenger trains.

The line utilizes the Canadian Pacific Kansas City Railway's C&M Subdivision from Union Station to Rondout and Metra's Fox Lake Subdivision from Rondout to Fox Lake.

== Operations ==
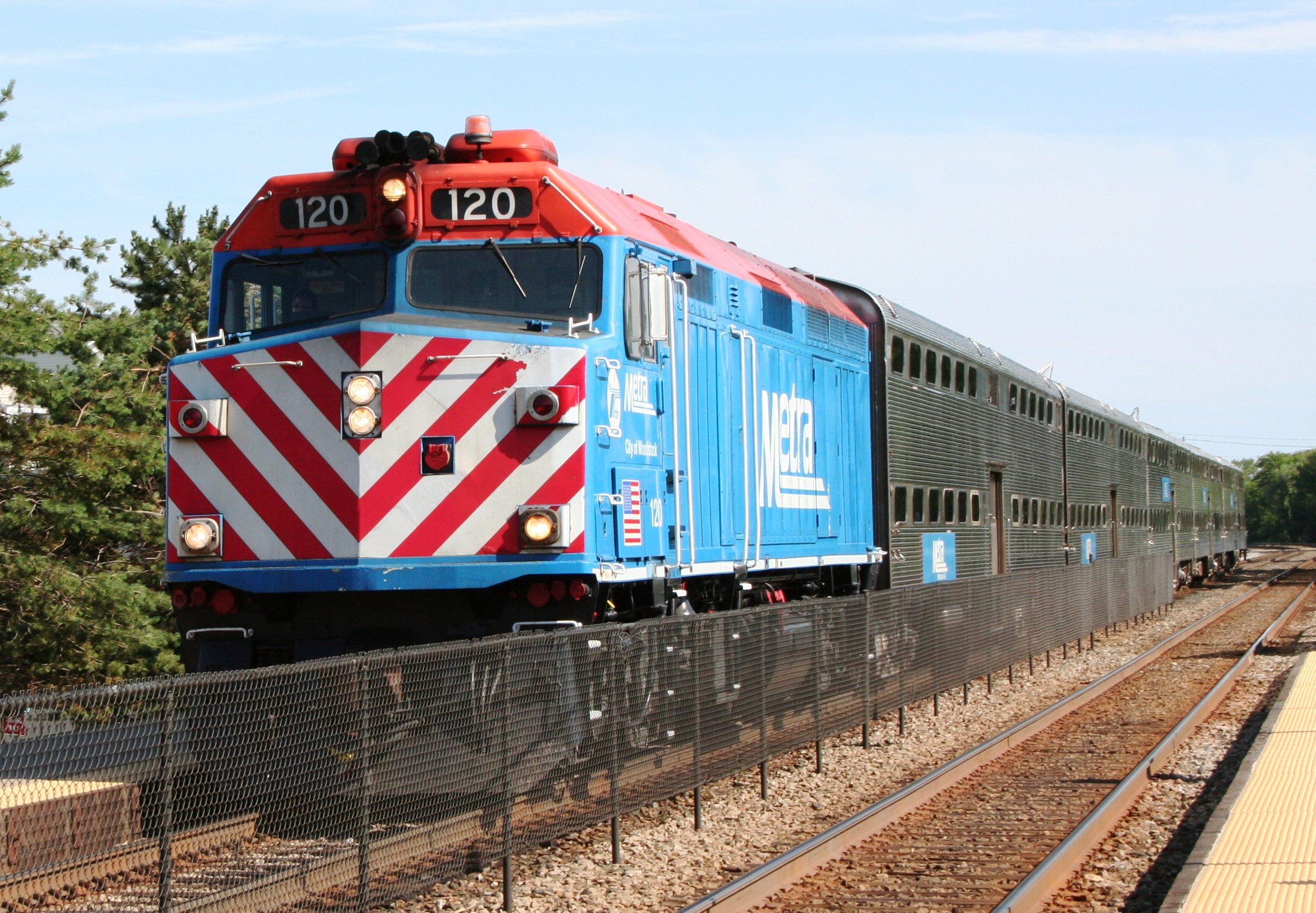
Metra F40PH #120 pulls an outbound train through Deerfield

Metra is the primary user of the C&M Subdivision, with commuter services operating between Union Station and Fox Lake. As of June 3, 2024, the public timetable shows 54 trains (27 in each direction) operating on weekdays, with 16 trains running to and from Fox Lake, five running to and from Grayslake, one running to and from Libertyville, four running to and from Lake Forest, and one running to and from Deerfield. Metra operates a reduced schedule on weekends, with nine trains operating between Union Station and Fox Lake, with an additional train on Saturday afternoons that short-turns at Lake Forest. This service is supplemented by Amtrak, whose Empire Builder, Hiawatha and Borealis inter-city trains operate on the line between Union Station and Rondout, and also stop at Glenview.

Metra began increased reverse commute service on the line on March 4, 2019. This service is part of a pilot-program funded under a two-year, public-private partnership between Metra and Lake County Partners. The increased reverse commute service was temporarily suspended during the COVID-19 pandemic, but was reinstated in December 2022. On June 3, 2024, Metra updated the timetable and stopping patterns for trains to better reflect current conditions, along with adding an additional late evening departure in each direction, with an inbound 10:30 p.m. train from Fox Lake to Union Station, and a 12:32 a.m. outbound train from Union Station to Fox Lake.

Metra has included the possibility of extending the Milwaukee District North Line along one of two routes in their Cost Benefit Analysis report. If this were to happen, the line could continue northwest via the Fox Lake branch to Richmond, with an additional stop in Spring Grove. Alternatively, the line could be extended north along the C&M Subdivision and continue from Rondout to Wadsworth, with additional stops in Green Oaks, Waukegan (separate from the Union Pacific North Line's station,) and Gurnee.

== History ==
Before 1982, this line was operated by the Chicago, Milwaukee, St. Paul and Pacific Railroad (Milwaukee Road). When the Milwaukee Road went bankrupt, the Regional Transportation Authority took over operation of the line. By 1984, the line passed to RTA's newly created Commuter Rail Division, which rebranded as Metra in 1985 (that same year, the Soo Line Railroad acquired controlling interest in the Milwaukee Road and absorbed it the following year). Metra acquired the line from the Soo Line in 1987. The Soo Line then ran freight trains on the line via trackage rights until it was absorbed into the Canadian Pacific Railway in 1990. CP Railway merged with the Kansas City Southern Railway in April 2023 into the Canadian Pacific Kansas City Limited, or CPKC Railway. Today this service is one of several Metra routes operated by Metra crews, but trains are dispatched under contract by the CPKC, which continues to hold trackage rights.

The Milwaukee District North Line route and Metra's track ownership diverge from the Chicago - Milwaukee - Minneapolis mainline at Rondout, Illinois and proceeds northwesterly toward Fox Lake. This secondary route, owned by Metra, was known as the Janesville Subdivision (J-Sub) of the Milwaukee Road. The mainline north of Rondout is owned by the CPKC through its American subsidiary Soo Line Railroad and sees Amtrak and freight traffic only. Metra service and track ownership end at Fox Lake. The tracks beyond Fox Lake are owned by the State of Wisconsin and operated for freight service by the Wisconsin and Southern Railroad. Commuter service beyond Fox Lake, abolished in 1982, served the communities of Spring Grove, Solon Mills, Zenda, and Walworth.

Until 1984, there was a stop in Rondout. The station building itself was demolished in the mid-1960s. The station was located at Rondout Junction, where the line crosses the Elgin, Joliet and Eastern Railway's tracks at a diamond junction. Before 1982, service ran as far north as Walworth, Wisconsin.

Metra has conducted studies on extending the Milwaukee District North Line to Richmond, Illinois, and constructing a second branch, running along the CPKC main line from Rondout north to Wadsworth. However, there are not any plans to construct the extension.

== Ridership ==
Between 2014 and 2019, annual ridership declined from 7,237,913 to 6,549,143, an overall decline of 9.5%. Due to the COVID-19 pandemic, ridership dropped to 1,556,783 passengers in 2020 and to 1,094,292 in 2021. Despite this overall annual decline, from April to December 2021, ridership was higher than in the same period in 2020. The line's 3,478,934 riders in 2025 made it the sixth busiest Metra line.

== Stations ==
State	County	Zone	Location	Station	Connections and notes
WI	Walworth		Walworth	Walworth	Closed October 1, 1982
WI	Walworth		Zenda	Zenda	Closed October 1, 1982
IL	McHenry				
IL	McHenry		Richmond	Richmond	Proposed new stop
IL	McHenry		Solon Mills	Solon Mills	Closed October 1, 1982
IL	McHenry		Spring Grove	Spring Grove	Closed October 1, 1982
IL	Lake	4	Fox Lake	Fox Lake	Pace: 570, 806
IL	Lake	4	Ingleside	Ingleside	Pace: 570
IL	Lake	4	Long Lake	Wilson Road	Closed 1984
IL	Lake	4	Long Lake	Long Lake	
IL	Lake	4	Round Lake	Round Lake	Pace: 570
IL	Lake	4	Grayslake	Grayslake	Pace: 570
IL	Lake	4	Libertyville	Prairie Crossing	Metra: North Central Service
IL	Lake	4	Libertyville	Libertyville	Pace: 574
IL	Lake	4	Rondout	Rondout	Closed 1984
IL	Lake	4	Lake Forest	Lake Forest	Formerly named Everett
IL	Lake	4	Deerfield	Deerfield	Pace: 471
IL	Cook	3	Deerfield	Lake Cook Road	Pace: 626
IL	Cook	3	Northbrook	Northbrook	Pace: 422
IL	Cook	3	Techny	Techny	Closed 1971
IL	Cook	3	Glenview	The Glen/North Glenview	Pace: 423
IL	Cook	3	Glenview	Glenview	Amtrak: Borealis, Empire Builder, Hiawatha; Pace: 210, 422, 423
IL	Cook	3	Golf	Golf	Pace: 208, 210
IL	Cook	2	Morton Grove	Morton Grove	Pace: 210, 250
IL	Cook	2	Chicago	Edgebrook	CTA buses: 84 85A; Pace: 225, 226
IL	Cook	2	Chicago	Forest Glen	CTA buses: 92
IL	Cook	2	Chicago	Mayfair	Chicago "L": Blue (at Montrose); CTA buses: 54 54A 78
IL	Cook	2	Chicago	Grayland	CTA buses: 56 152
IL	Cook	2	Chicago	Healy	CTA buses: 53 74; Formerly named Pennock
IL	Cook	2	Chicago	Western Avenue	Metra: Milwaukee District West, North Central Service; CTA buses: 49 X49 65
IL	Cook	1	Chicago	Union Station	Amtrak (long-distance): California Zephyr, Cardinal, City of New Orleans, Empire Builder, Floridian, Lake Shore Limited, Southwest Chief, Texas Eagle; Amtrak (intercity): Blue Water, Borealis, Hiawatha, Illini and Saluki, Illinois Zephyr and Carl Sandburg, Lincoln Service, Pere Marquette, Wolverine; Metra: BNSF, Heritage Corridor, Milwaukee District West, North Central Service, SouthWest Service; Chicago "L": Blue (at Clinton), Brown Orange Pink Purple (at Quincy); CTA buses: 1 7 J14 19 28 56 60 120 121 124 125 126 128 130 151 156 157 192; Pace: 755; Amtrak Thruway: Chicago–Madison and Chicago–Rockford (Van Galder), Chicago–Louisville (Greyhound)
