= Washington Street/Grayslake station =

Commuter rail station in Grayslake, Illinois

Washington Street

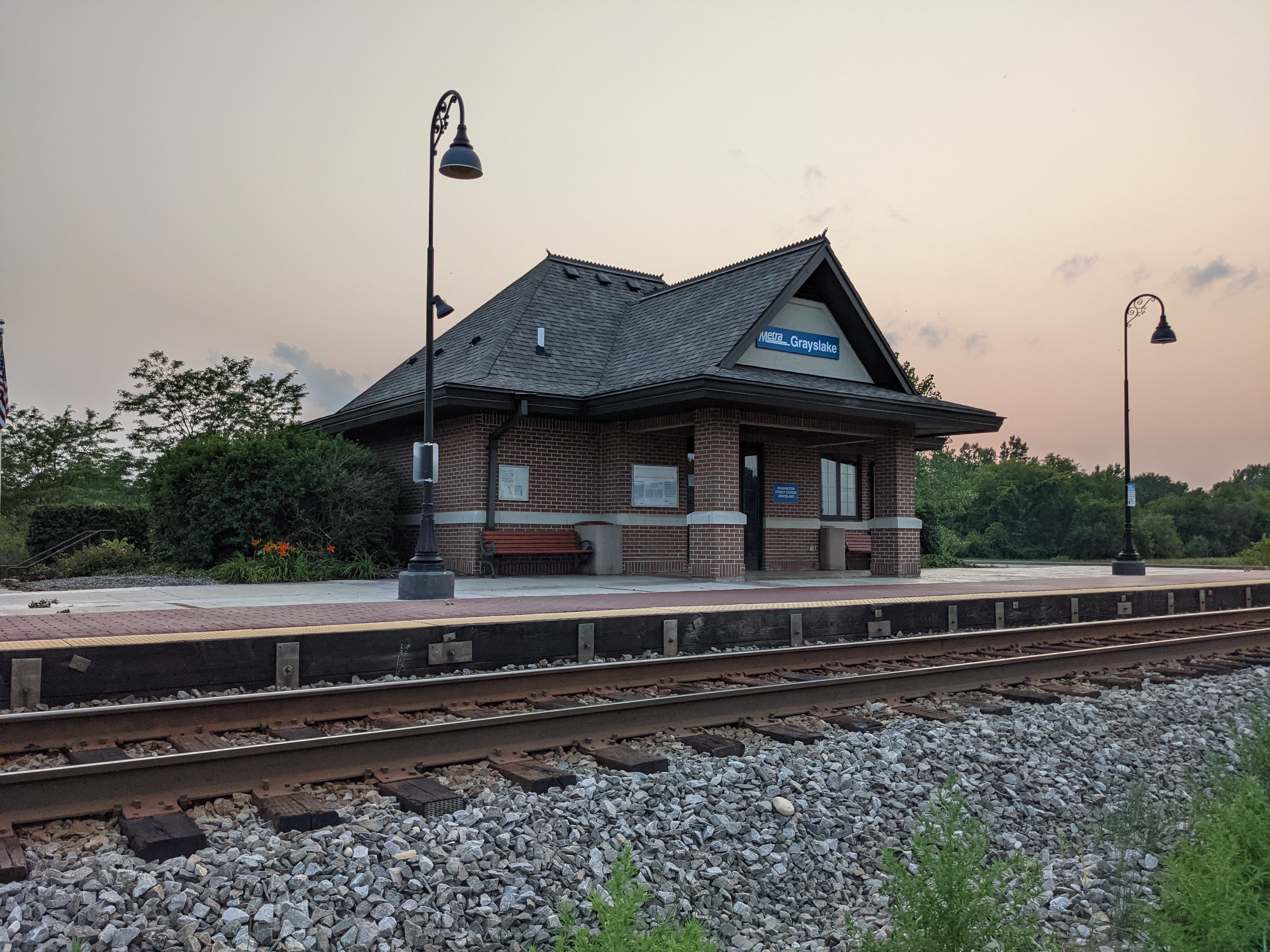
- Washington Street station in July 2021

General information
- Location: 330 West Washington Street; Grayslake, Illinois
- Coordinates: 42.3593°N 88.0504°W
- Owner: Metra
- Line: CN Waukesha Subdivision
- Platforms: 1 side platform
- Tracks: 1

Construction
- Parking: Yes
- Accessible: Yes

Other information
- Fare zone: 4

History
- Opened: January 30, 2006

Passengers
- 2018: 86 (average weekday) ▼21.8%
- Rank: 196 out of 236

Services
Preceding station	Metra	Following station
Round Lake Beach toward Antioch	North Central Service	Prairie Crossing toward Union Station
Former services
Preceding station	Soo Line	Following station
Lake Villa toward Portal	Main Line	Prairie Crossing toward Chicago
Track layout
Location

Washington Street/Grayslake is a station on Metra's North Central Service in Grayslake, Illinois. The station is 46.5 miles (74.8 km) away from Chicago Union Station, the southern terminus of the line. In Metra's zone-based fare system, Washington Street is in zone 4. As of 2018, Washington Street is the 196th busiest of Metra's 236 non-downtown stations, with an average of 86 weekday boardings. Washington Street was opened on January 30, 2006, along with three other stations on the North Central Service.

As of February 15, 2024, Washington Street is served by all 14 trains (seven in each direction) on weekdays.
