= Lake Villa station =

Commuter rail station in Lake Villa, Illinois

Lake Villa

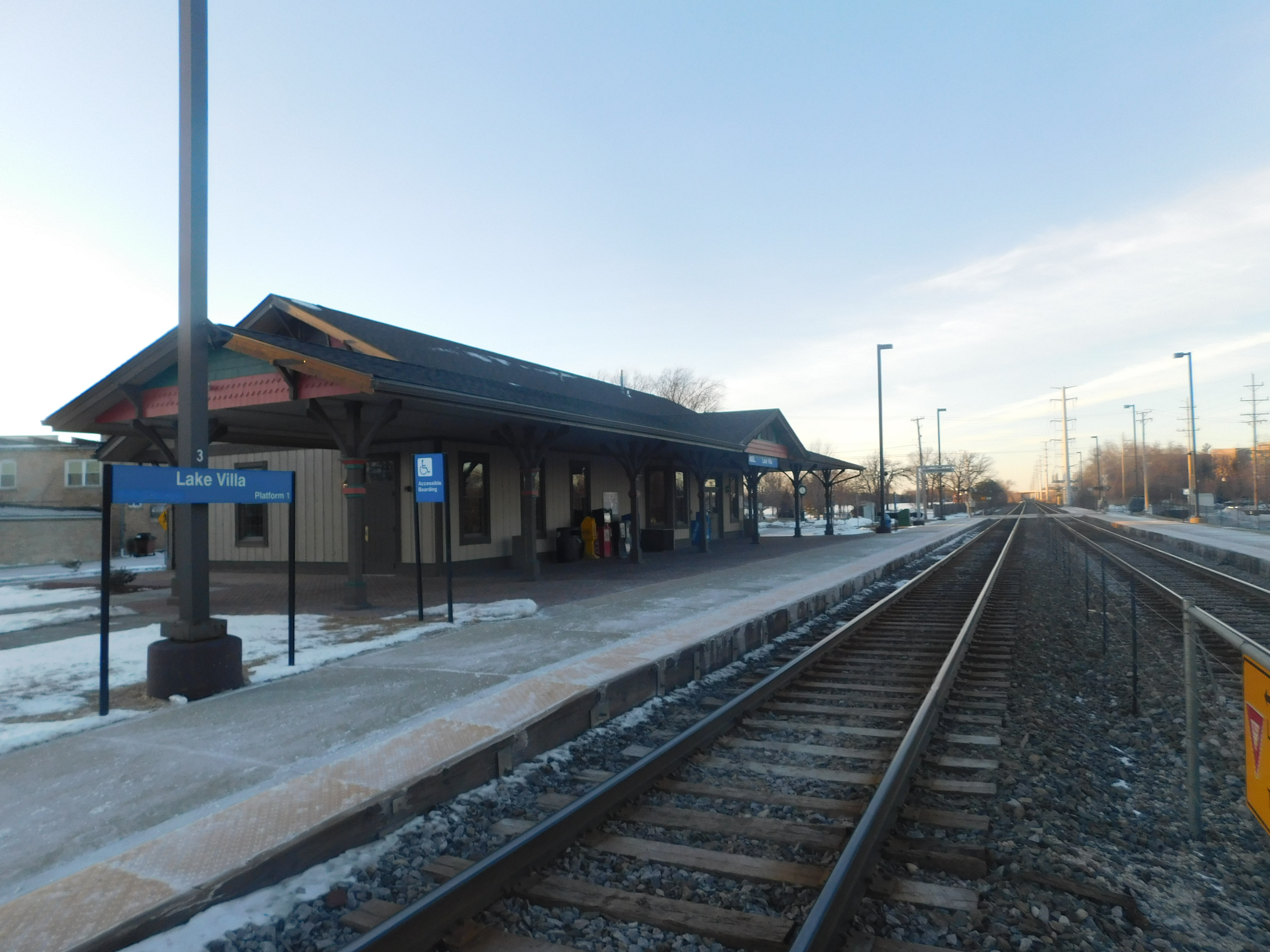
- Lake Villa station in February 2016

General information
- Location: 129 Railroad Avenue; Lake Villa, Illinois
- Coordinates: 42.4175°N 88.0795°W
- Owner: Metra
- Line: CN Waukesha Subdivision
- Platforms: 2 side platforms
- Tracks: 2

Construction
- Accessible: Yes

Other information
- Fare zone: 4

History
- Opened: July 26, 1886
- Rebuilt: August 19, 1996

Passengers
- 2018: 130 (average weekday) ▼12.2%
- Rank: 178 out of 236

Services
Preceding station	Metra	Following station
Antioch Terminus	North Central Service	Round Lake Beach toward Union Station
Former services
Preceding station	Soo Line	Following station
Antioch toward Portal	Main Line	Grays Lake toward Chicago
Track layout
Location

Lake Villa is a station on Metra's North Central Service in Lake Villa, Illinois. The station is 48.4 miles (77.9 km) away from Chicago Union Station, the southern terminus of the line. In Metra's zone-based fare system, Lake Villa is in zone 4. As of 2018, Lake Villa is the 178th busiest of Metra's 236 non-downtown stations, with an average of 130 weekday boardings.

As of February 15, 2024, Lake Villa is served by all 14 trains (seven in each direction) on weekdays.

The Lake Villa depot is a reconstruction of the original Minneapolis, St. Paul and Sault Ste. Marie Railroad depot from 1886. The depot was reconstructed in 1996.
