= Fox Lake Subdivision =

Railway line in Illinois

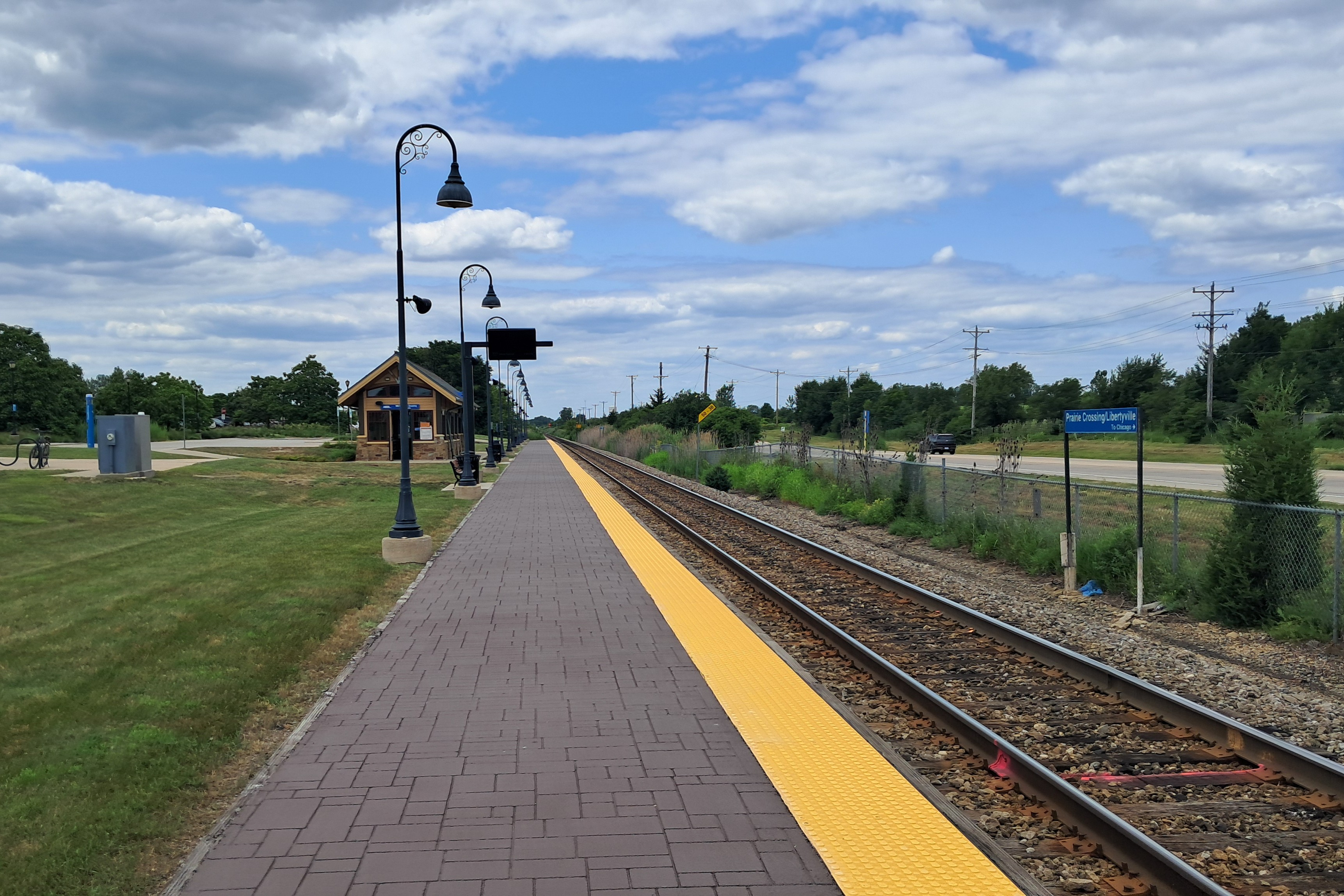
- Fox Lake Subdivision at Prairie Crossing station

Overview
- Owner: Metra (Wisconsin & Southern Railroad beyond Fox Lake)
- Termini: Rondout; Fox Lake
- Stations: 7

Service
- Services: Milwaukee District North Line

Technical
- Line length: 17.5 mi (28.2 km)
- Number of tracks: 1
- Track gauge: 1,435 mm (4 ft 8 1/2 in) standard gauge

The Fox Lake Subdivision is a railway line in the state of Illinois in the United States. It runs 17.5 miles (28.2 km) from a junction with the C&M Subdivision of the CPKC Railway at Rondout, Illinois, to a junction with the Wisconsin and Southern Railroad at Fox Lake, Illinois. Metra, the commuter rail authority for the Chicago area, owns and operates the line. The line hosts Milwaukee District North Line commuter trains. The entire line is single tracked, with the exception of a passing siding at Grayslake. The line is part of the former Milwaukee Road route between Chicago and Madison, Wisconsin. The Wisconsin & Southern owns the portion between Fox Lake and Janesville, Wisconsin, and has trackage rights over the Metra portion. The tracks north of Metra's Fox Lake station host exclusively freight traffic.
