= Rondout, Illinois =

Rondout, Illinois Sulphur Glen
- Unincorporated community
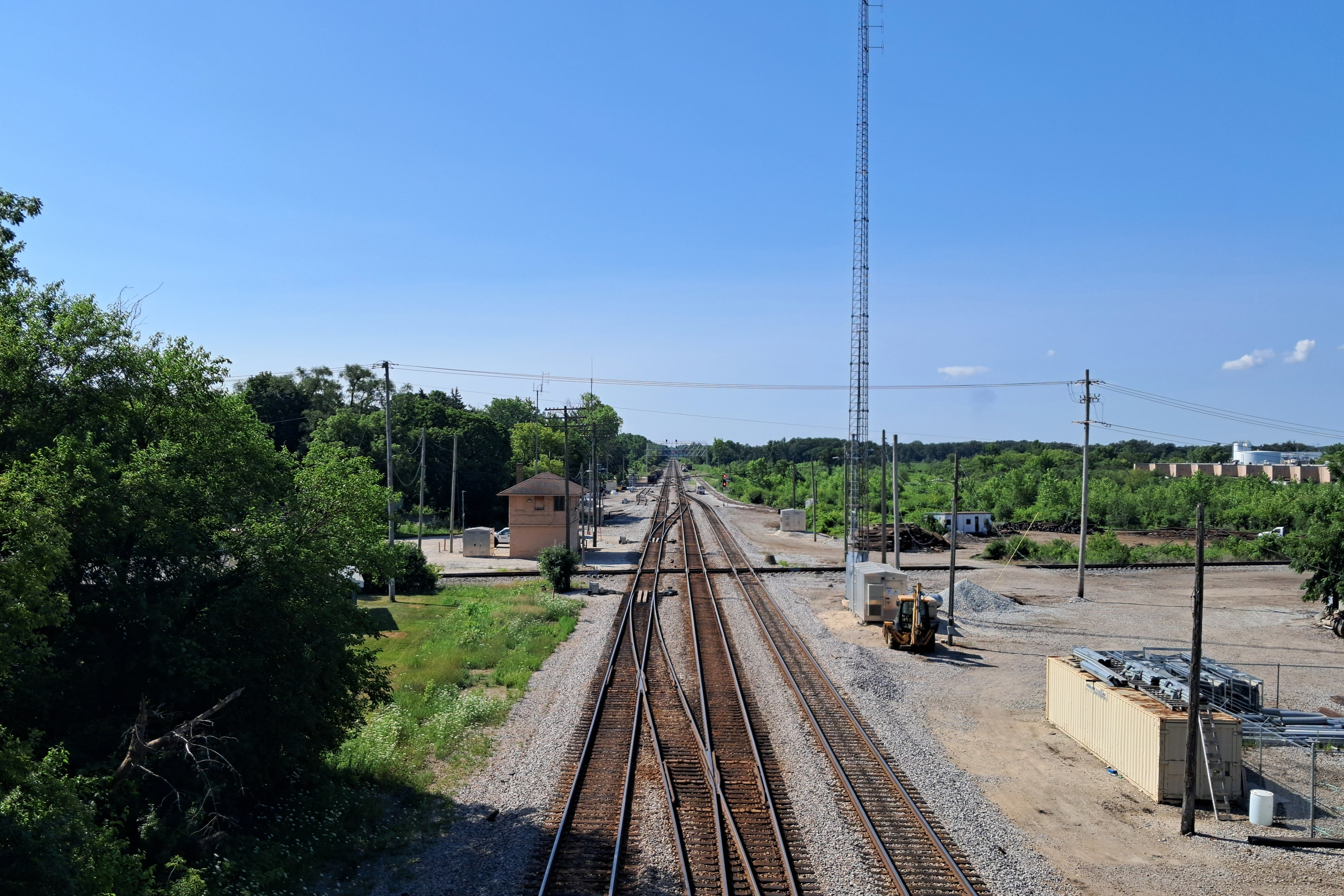
- C&M Subdivision at the EJ&E Railway

- Location in Illinois Location in the United States
- Coordinates: 42°16′48″N 87°53′43″W
- Country: United States
- State: Illinois
- County: Lake
- Township: Libertyville
- Time zone: UTC−6 (CST)
  - Summer (DST): UTC−5 (CDT)
- Postal code: 60044, 60045, 60048
- Area codes: 847, 224

Rondout is an unincorporated community in Lake County, Illinois, United States, that first formed around a railroad junction. The area is located within Libertyville Township. As Rondout is an unincorporated community rather than a municipality, it lacks clearly defined borders and shares postal codes with Lake Bluff, Lake Forest, and Libertyville, Illinois. It has its own elementary school which comes under Rondout School District 72. Illinois Route 176 passes east–west through Rondout, serving as the "main street" of the community, where it is also called "Rockland Road".

== History ==
=== Rondout Community ===
Between 1870 and 1872, the Milwaukee & St. Paul Railroad (later the Milwaukee Road; since 1986 the Canadian Pacific Railway - CPR) completed a railroad line between Chicago, Illinois and Milwaukee, Wisconsin. In 1880, a branch line was built to Libertyville, Illinois, and the new junction was known as Libertyville Junction. People referred to the community around the junction as Sulfur Glen, due to the high level of sulphur in the water nearby. In 1888, the community was renamed Rondout, after Rondout, New York. One account has the community renaming itself in an unsuccessful attempt to attract a business from the aforementioned town in New York. Another has a Sulfur Glen resident asking the railroad to rename the community after his former hometown.

In 1951, Peter Baker & Son Co. moved their asphalt plant from Lake Forest to Rondout, contributing to the development of the area.

=== History of Rondout and Railroads ===
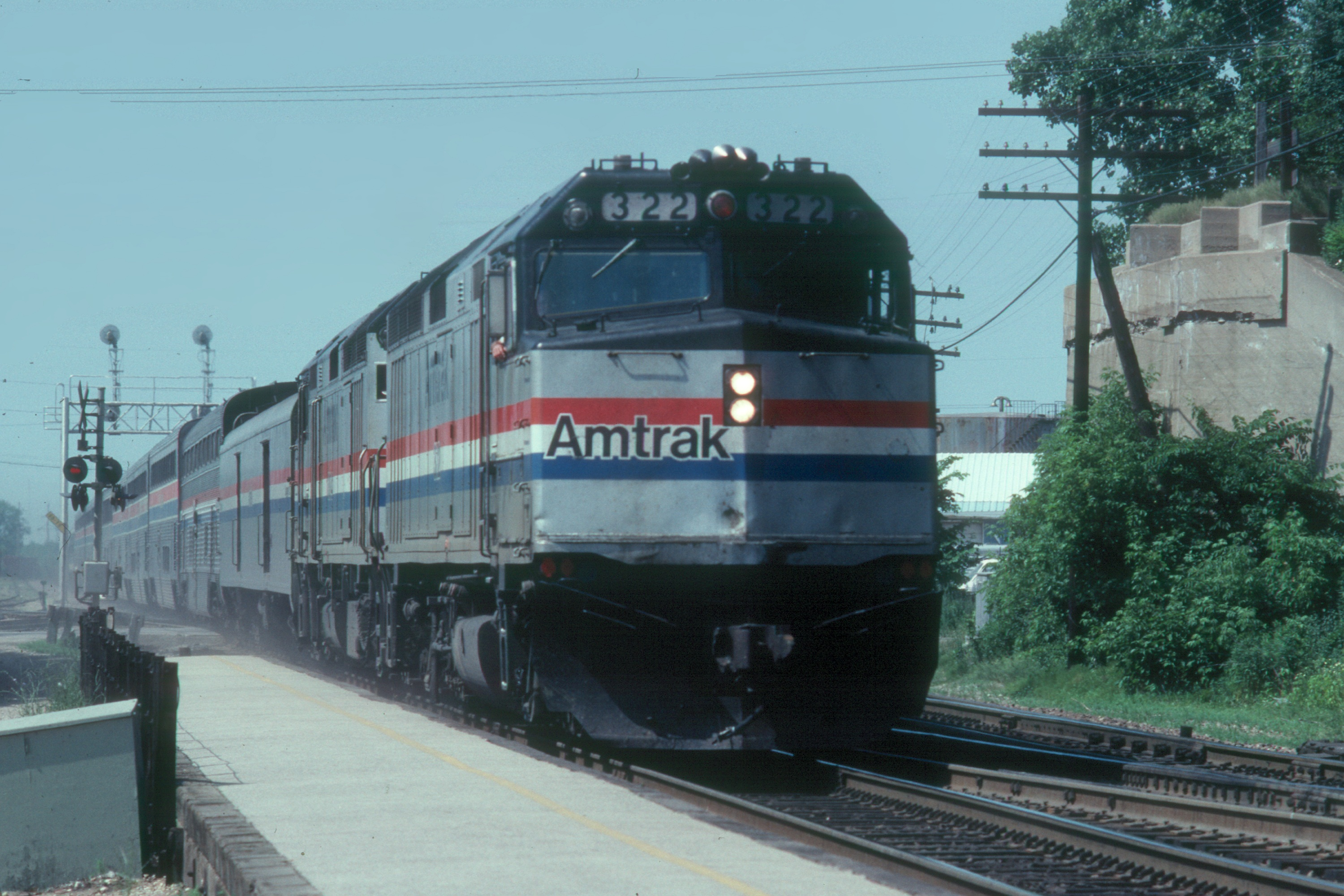
Amtrak Empire Builder at Rondout station in 1983

As noted above, the initial north-south and northwest three-way railroad junction was built in 1880 by a predecessor of the CPR, which still operates it.

In 1889, another railroad line was built that crossed the Milwaukee & St. Paul/CPR northeast-southwest at grade, just south of the first Rondout junction point. This new 1889 line was built by the Waukegan and Southwestern Railway, then acquired shortly thereafter by the Elgin, Joliet & Eastern Railway, which was in turn acquired in 2009 by the Canadian National Railway (CNR). The crossing and the freight interchange connecting the CNR a newer line to what is now the CPR still exist as of 2017. This new 1889 crossing necessitated the construction of an interlocking tower southeast of the expanded junction.

Then, in 1902, the Chicago & Milwaukee Electric Railway's branch to Mundelein was built, parallel to Rockland Road and passing over the EJ&E and Milwaukee Road above grade, almost directly above the existing Rondout junction. In 1916, Samuel Insull purchased and reorganized the Chicago & Milwaukee as the Chicago, North Shore and Milwaukee, often called the North Shore Line. The North Shore Line's freight interchange with the Milwaukee Road, and its above-grade Rondout Station passenger platforms and shelters, survived until the entire North Shore Line went out of business in January, 1963.

In the first decade of the 20th century, Rondout junction's original grade-level interlocking tower was replaced by a brick structure. By 2013, it was one of the few remaining railroad interlocking towers in Illinois. In early 2015, it was closed with control transferred to the CP dispatching center in St. Paul, MN. The structure remains in use as an office for Metra maintenance staff.

On June 12, 1924, Rondout was the site of the largest train robbery in United States history. Several outlaws, including the "Newton Gang" and a corrupt postal inspector, targeted Milwaukee Road's Fast Mail train and successfully carried out a robbery of more than $2 million of cash, jewelry and securities. All of the conspirators were caught and prosecuted shortly afterwards, all but $100,000 of the stolen goods were recovered, and a historical marker was built to commemorate the event.

As of 2017 commuter trains still pass through Rondout on the Milwaukee District North Line, and they formerly stopped there at the main Rondout Station located on Rockland Road, just south of the junction's split between the Libertyville/Fox Lake, Illinois, branch and the Chicago-Milwaukee main line at the diamond with the EJ&E. The station house was removed on January 1, 1979, but Regional Transportation Authority/Metra commuter trains continued stopping at Rondout station until November 22, 1984. The station platforms and signage remained for a time. Most of the platform was demolished in 1997, and access to the remaining platform was officially restricted on January 1, 2002.

Preceding station	Milwaukee Road	Following station
Wilson toward Milwaukee	Chicago – Milwaukee	West Lake Forest toward Chicago
Libertyville toward Walworth	Suburban Service North Line	West Lake Forest toward Chicago
Libertyville toward Madison	Madison – Rondout	Terminus

=== Rondout's Railroads Today ===
Metra's Milwaukee District North Line commuter trains, between Chicago and Fox Lake, via Lake Forest and Libertyville, continue to pass through Rondout junction to the present day (2017). So do Amtrak's Hiawatha, Borealis, and Empire Builder intercity passenger trains, using the Chicago-Milwaukee-Minneapolis/St. Paul main line.

At the Rondout railroad junction today (2017), just south of Rt. 176/Rockland Road, the CNR's single-track Waukegan Subdivision (operated by CNR's Wisconsin Central subsidiary) still crosses the north-south C&M (rail) Subdivision. The Union Pacific Railroad has trackage rights on the Waukegan Subdivision. The Fox Lake Subdivision still branches off to the northwest, through Libertyville. Metra now owns the Fox Lake Subdivision and the portion of the C&M Subdivision from Rondout south, while the CPR still owns the north portion, and the CPR's Soo Line dispatches all of both subdivisions. Railroads that have trackage rights over various parts of the two subdivisions include Amtrak, the CPR, Metra and the Wisconsin and Southern Railroad.

Since 2017, the former North Shore Line's Mundelein branch is now the North Shore Bike Path, a rail trail paralleling Rockland Road and still elevated over Rondout junction.

== Education ==
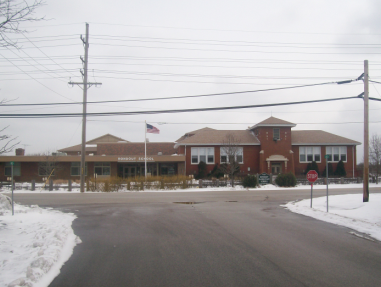
Rondout School

Rondout is served by Rondout School District 72, consisting of a lone elementary school, Rondout School. The school provides education from Kindergarten through Eighth Grade to students living in Rondout and several adjacent communities. Graduates of Rondout School attend Libertyville High School.

== Appearances in media ==
- The 1998 film The Newton Boys features a sequence depicting the 1924 train robbery.
