= C&M Subdivision =

Railway line in Wisconsin and Illinois

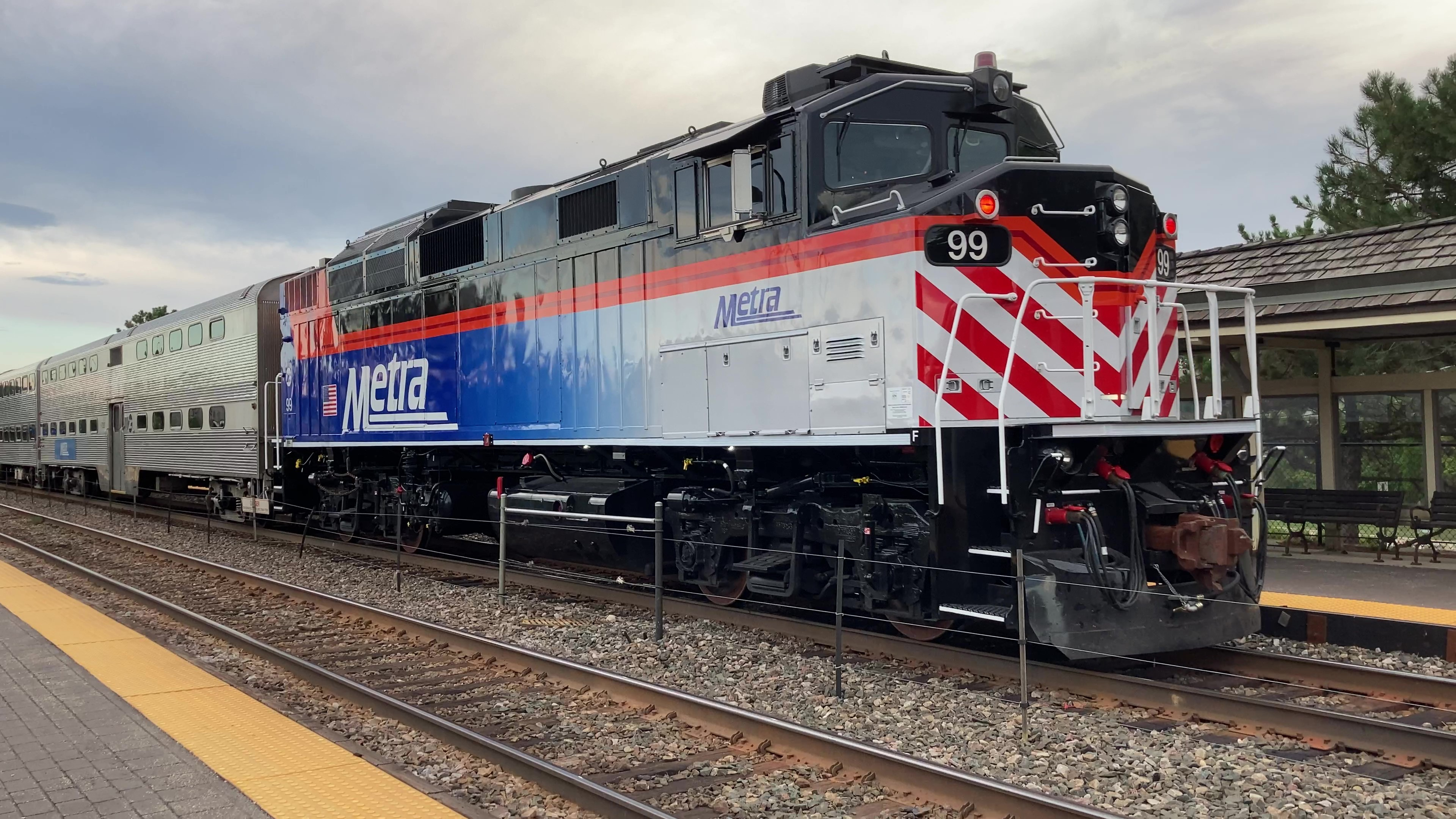
- Metra F59PH #99 At Deerfield Station

Overview
- Status: Active
- Owner: Canadian Pacific Kansas City Limited (north of Rondout, Illinois); Metra (Rondout, Illinois to Chicago Union Station)
- Locale: Northern Chicago metropolitan area, Milwaukee
- Termini: Chicago Union Station; Milwaukee Intermodal Station
- Continues from: Chicago Subdivision
- Continues as: Watertown Subdivision

Service
- Type: Commuter rail, Intercity rail, Freight rail
- Operator(s): Canadian Pacific Kansas City Limited, Amtrak, Metra

History
- Completed: 1873

Technical
- Line length: 85.5 mi (137.6 km)
- Number of tracks: 2, 3
- Track gauge: 4 ft 8 1/2 in (1,435 mm) standard gauge
- Signalling: Centralized traffic control

The Chicago and Milwaukee Subdivision (commonly referred to as the C&M Subdivision or C&M Sub) is a 85.5-mile (137.6 km) railway line running between Chicago, Illinois and Milwaukee, Wisconsin. It is mostly dispatched by Canadian Pacific Kansas City Limited (through its primary United States subsidiary, the Soo Line Railroad) from a CP Rail facility in Minneapolis. From Pacific Junction (Tower A-5) to Chicago Union Station, it is dispatched by Metra's Consolidated Control Facility. The C&M Subdivision is the primary of CPKC's two northern routes from Chicago. The Union Pacific Railroad operates its Milwaukee Subdivision, a former Chicago & Northwestern Railway line, parallel to the C&M (albeit to the east).

From Chicago Union Station to Pacific Junction (Tower A-5), the territory is triple tracked and primarily hosts Amtrak and Metra trains. From Pacific Junction (Tower A-5) to Milwaukee, it is double tracked. Freight trains do not go further south of Pacific Junction (Tower A-5) unless they are reversing to access the Belt Railway of Chicago at Cragin Junction (where the Milwaukee District West Line's Grand/Cicero station is located). This junction is the northernmost point of the Belt Railway.

The line carries Amtrak's Empire Builder, Borealis, and Hiawatha, while Metra operates trains on the Milwaukee District North Line between Union Station and Rondout. The Wisconsin & Southern Railroad runs freight services from Janesville, Wisconsin to Chicago WSOR using trackage rights south of Rondout. Canadian Pacific also runs frequent freight trains on this line.

== History ==
The line had previously been owned by the Chicago, Milwaukee, St. Paul and Pacific Railroad, commonly known as the Milwaukee Road. It once carried the Milwaukee Road's fast Hiawatha passenger trains, including trains that regularly exceeded 100 miles per hour (160 km/h). For several years in the 1940s and early 1950s, trains were scheduled to run along this stretch in 75 minutes or less. The line between Rondout, Illinois and Chicago Union Station fell under the control (not the ownership) of the Northeast Illinois Regional Commuter Rail Corporation in 1982, five years after the Milwaukee filed for its last bankruptcy (though the Milwaukee Road retained ownership of the line between Chicago Union Station and Rondout until 1986). Metra was formed in 1984 and bought the line from the Soo Line Railroad in 1987, with the latter continuing to operate freight trains thereafter via trackage rights. This continued until the Soo was usurped by the Canadian Pacific Railway in 1990. Thirty-three years later, CP amalgamated with the Kansas City Southern Railway to form Canadian Pacific Kansas City, or CPKC. While stricter regulations eventually reduced the speed limit to 79 miles per hour (127 km/h) along this stretch, plans are in place as of 2010 to improve the line to support speeds up to 110 miles per hour (180 km/h)—modestly faster than historic trains that used the route.
