= Fox Lake station =

Commuter rail station in Fox Lake, Illinois

Fox Lake

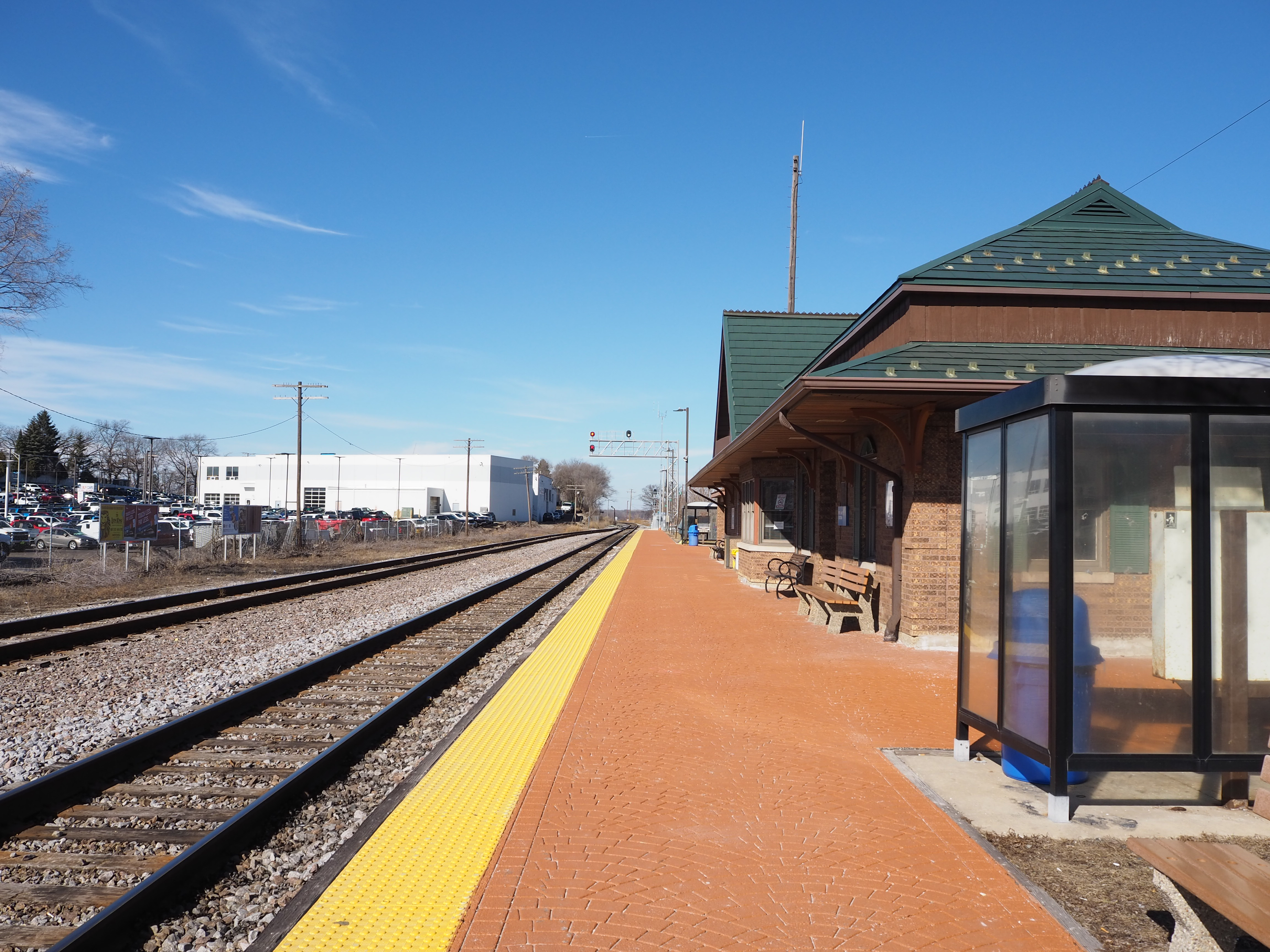

General information
- Location: 22 N Nippersink Boulevard; Fox Lake, Illinois
- Coordinates: 42.3984°N 88.1823°W
- Owner: Village of Fox Lake
- Line: Fox Lake Subdivision
- Platforms: 1 side platform
- Tracks: 3
- Connections: Pace Buses

Construction
- Parking: Yes
- Cycle facilities: Yes (Open sheltered bicycle rack)
- Accessible: Yes

Other information
- Fare zone: 4

History
- Opened: 1902
- Rebuilt: 2001

Passengers
- 2018: 322 (average weekday) ▼9.6%
- Rank: 141 out of 236

Services
Preceding station	Metra	Following station
Terminus	Milwaukee District North	Ingleside toward Union Station
Former services
Preceding station	Milwaukee Road	Following station
Spring Grove toward Madison	Madison – Rondout	Ingleside toward Rondout
Spring Grove toward Walworth	Suburban Service North Line	Ingleside toward Chicago
Track layout
Location

Fox Lake is a station on Metra's Milwaukee District North Line in Fox Lake, Illinois. The station is located on Nippersink Boulevard at Grand Avenue, is 49.5 miles (79.7 km) away from Chicago Union Station, the southern terminus of the line, and serves commuters from Fox Lake to Downtown Chicago. The station is the northern terminus of the Milwaukee District North Line. As of 2018, Fox Lake is the 141st busiest of Metra's 236 non-downtown stations, with an average of 322 weekday boardings.

As of February 15, 2024, Fox Lake is served by 32 trains (16 in each direction) on weekdays, by 18 trains (nine in each direction) on Saturdays, and by all 18 trains (nine in each direction) on Sundays and holidays. All Metra trains that serve Fox Lake originate and terminate here.

Until 1982 commuter trains continued to Walworth, Wisconsin and until the creation of Amtrak in 1971, inter-city trains like the Varsity and the Sioux, both operated by the Milwaukee Road, connected Fox Lake with Janesville, Wisconsin, Madison, Wisconsin, and Rapid City, South Dakota.

== Station layout ==
Fox Lake consists of a single platform serving in-service Metra trains. Two other tracks exist at the station, but they are only used for locomotives that pull out of the yard to switch onto the mainline. A coach yard used to store trains during off-peak hours and overnight is located just east of the station. The tracks north of Fox Lake are owned by the state of Wisconsin, are operated for freight service by the Wisconsin and Southern Railroad, and see freight traffic only. Also, commuter service beyond the station was abolished in the 1980s. From 2000 to 2001, Amtrak ran the Lake Country Limited over the WSOR trackage. This service did not stop in Fox Lake and was discontinued due to low ridership and bad conditions of the tracks north of Fox Lake.

== Bus connections ==
Pace

- 570 Fox Lake-CLC
- 806 Crystal Lake-Fox Lake
