= Mannheim station =

Mannheim station may refer to:

- Mannheim station (Illinois), a train station in Franklin Park, Illinois, US
- Mannheim Hauptbahnhof, a railway station in Mannheim, Baden–Würtemberg, Germany
- Mannheim-Handelshafen station, a railway station in Mannheim
- Mannheim-Waldhof station, a railway station in Mannheim
- Mannheim ARENA/Maimarkt station, a railway station in Mannheim
- Neu-Edingen/Mannheim-Friedrichsfeld station, a separation station in Mannheim
