= Franklin Park station =

Commuter rail station in Franklin Park, Illinois

Franklin Park

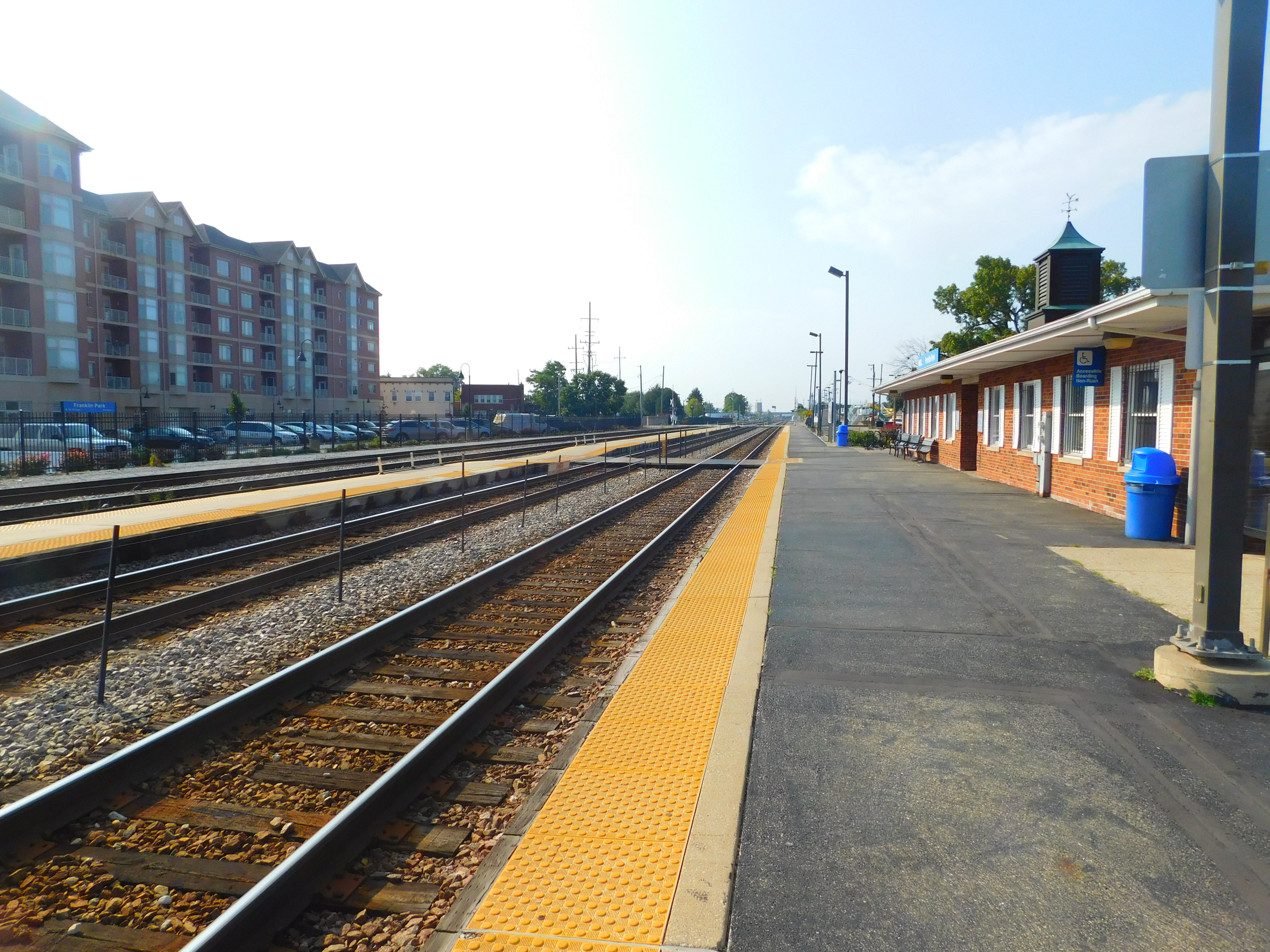
- Franklin Park station in September 2016

General information
- Location: 3148 Rose Street; Franklin Park, Illinois
- Coordinates: 41.9366°N 87.8664°W
- Owner: Village of Franklin Park
- Line: Elgin Subdivision
- Platforms: 1 side platform, 1 island platform
- Tracks: 4
- Connections: Pace Buses

Construction
- Parking: Yes
- Accessible: Yes

Other information
- Fare zone: 2

History
- Opened: 1950

Passengers
- 2018: 392 (average weekday) ▼14.4%
- Rank: 123 out of 236

Services
Preceding station	Metra	Following station
Mannheim Weekday Limited toward Big Timber/Elgin	Milwaukee District West	River Grove toward Union Station
Former services
Preceding station	Milwaukee Road	Following station
Mannheim toward Elgin	Suburban Service West Line	River Grove toward Chicago
Track layout
Location

Franklin Park is one of two stations on Metra's Milwaukee District West Line in Franklin Park, Illinois. The station is 13.2 miles (21.2 km) away from Chicago Union Station, the eastern terminus of the line. In Metra's zone-based fare system, Franklin Park is in zone 2. As of 2018, Franklin Park is the 123rd busiest of Metra's 236 non-downtown stations, with an average of 392 weekday boardings.

As of February 15, 2024, Franklin Park is served by 48 trains (23 inbound, 25 outbound) on weekdays, by all 24 trains (12 in each direction) on Saturdays, and by all 18 trains (nine in each direction) on Sundays and holidays. On weekdays, three inbound trains originate here, and three outbound trains terminate here.

Franklin Park is a centerpiece of the Milwaukee District West Line. Located adjacent to CPKC's Bensenville Yard, the station sees a large volume of freight traffic, and many trains on the MD-W line run express to and from this station. The two north tracks are used by Metra and the two south tracks are used for freight (CPKC) trains. The annual Railroad Daze festival is held at this station, and is a festival catered to railfans and celebrates the railroad's role in Franklin Park's history. The historic B-12 interlocking tower for the Milwaukee Railroad is situated one block west of the station in a small park, accompanied by a preserved Milwaukee Road caboose. This tower, constructed in the 1890s, was located at the intersection of the MD-W line and the Canadian National (ex-Soo Line/Wisconsin Central) tracks. It closed permanently in July 1996 and was relocated the following year. In late 2004, the state of Illinois, along with CP, CN, and the Indiana Harbor Belt, took part in and executed a major rail relocation plan. This project included the consolidation of the IHB roadbed with the CN's at Richard Avenue in neighboring River Grove, the closedown and demolition of IHB grade crossings at Schiller Boulevard, Chestnut Avenue, Franklin Avenue, Edgington Street, and Grand Avenue, and the demolition and replacement of the CN grade crossing on Grand Avenue with a new green underpass bridge. Following the project, the old IHB right-of-way north of the railroad's Norpaul Yard became Martens Street. The bridge was formally dedicated by the village of Franklin Park in September 2007. Although the Milwaukee system as a whole ceased to exist in 1986, the tower still dons the Milwaukee Road logo.

Franklin Park Station is the last station outbound along the Milwaukee District West Line to use three tracks. It is also the closest full service Metra station to O'Hare International Airport.

== Bus connections ==
Pace

- "Route 303 – Forest Park/Rosemont". PaceBus.com. Chicago: Pace Suburban Bus Service. (Weekdays Only)
