= Bensenville station =

Commuter rail station in Bensenville, Illinois

Bensenville

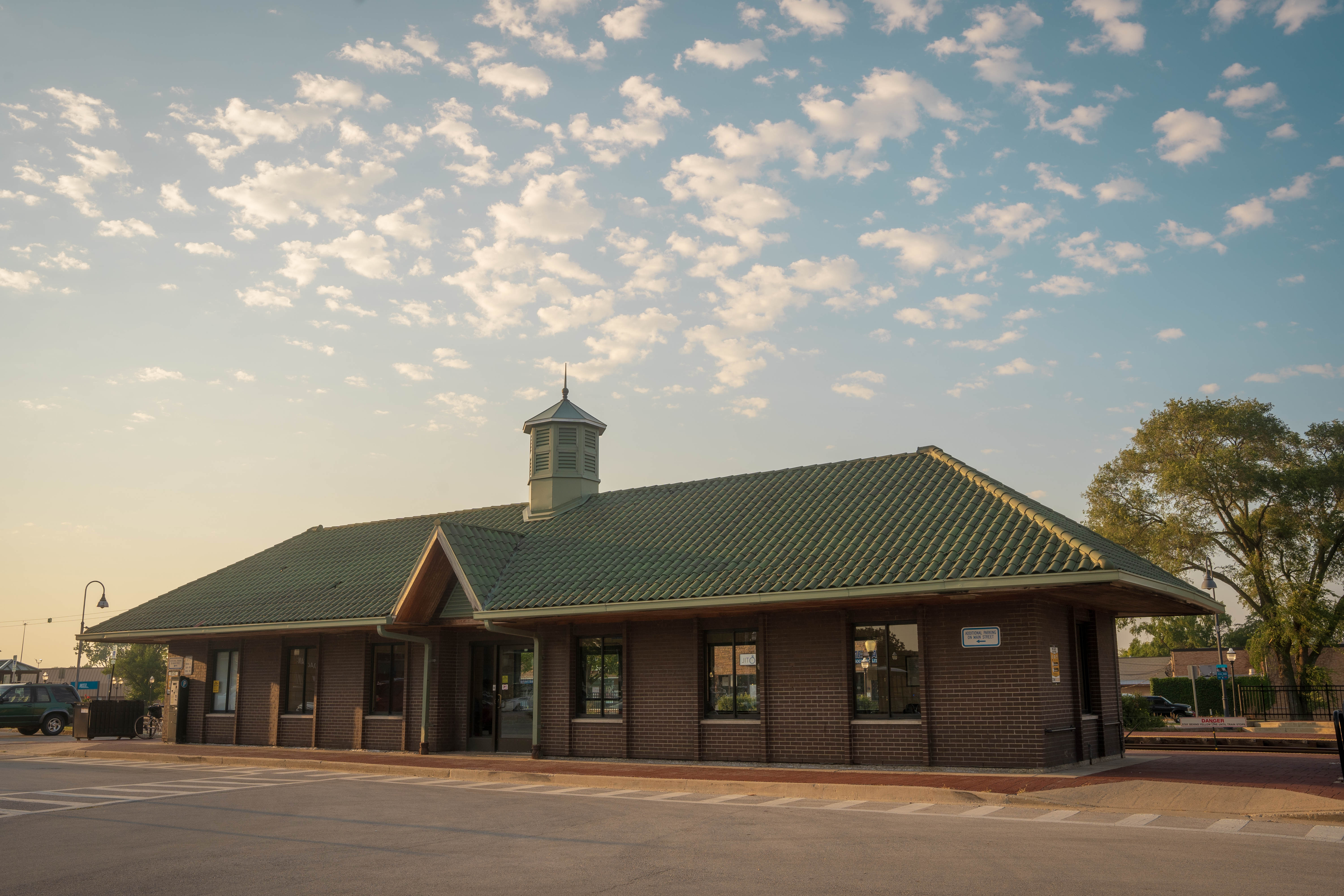
- Bensenville station in August 2023

General information
- Location: 110 West Main Street; Bensenville, Illinois
- Coordinates: 41.9569°N 87.9418°W
- Owner: Metra
- Line: Elgin Subdivision
- Platforms: 2 side platforms
- Tracks: 2
- Connections: Pace Buses

Construction
- Accessible: Yes

Other information
- Fare zone: 3

History
- Rebuilt: 1989

Passengers
- 2018: 414 (average weekday) ▲16%
- Rank: 115 out of 236

Services
Preceding station	Metra	Following station
Wood Dale toward Big Timber/Elgin	Milwaukee District West	Mannheim Weekday Limited toward Union Station
Former services
Preceding station	Milwaukee Road	Following station
Wooddale toward Elgin	Suburban Service West Line	Mannheim toward Chicago
Track layout
Location

Bensenville is a station on Metra's Milwaukee District West Line in Bensenville, Illinois. The station is 17.2 miles (27.7 km) away from Chicago Union Station, the eastern terminus of the line. In Metra's zone-based fare system, Bensenville is in zone 3. As of 2018, Bensenville is the 115th busiest of Metra's 236 non-downtown stations, with an average of 414 weekday boardings.

As of February 15, 2024, Bensenville is served by 42 trains (20 inbound, 22 outbound) on weekdays, by all 24 trains (12 in each direction) on Saturdays, and by all 18 trains (nine in each direction) on Sundays and holidays.

Bensenville station is located on the south side of Main Street across from the railroad tracks. A wide at-grade pedestrian crosswalk provides access between West Main Street and the station. Parking is available along the south side of West Main Street west of Addison Street, but also behind the station house at the intersection of Center & Railroad Streets. CPKC's Bensenville Yard is east of the station.

== Bus connections ==
Pace

- "Route 319 – Grand Avenue". PaceBus.com. Chicago: Pace Suburban Bus Service. (weekdays only)
- "Route 332 – River Road/York Road". PaceBus.com. Chicago: Pace Suburban Bus Service. (weekdays only)

== Gallery ==
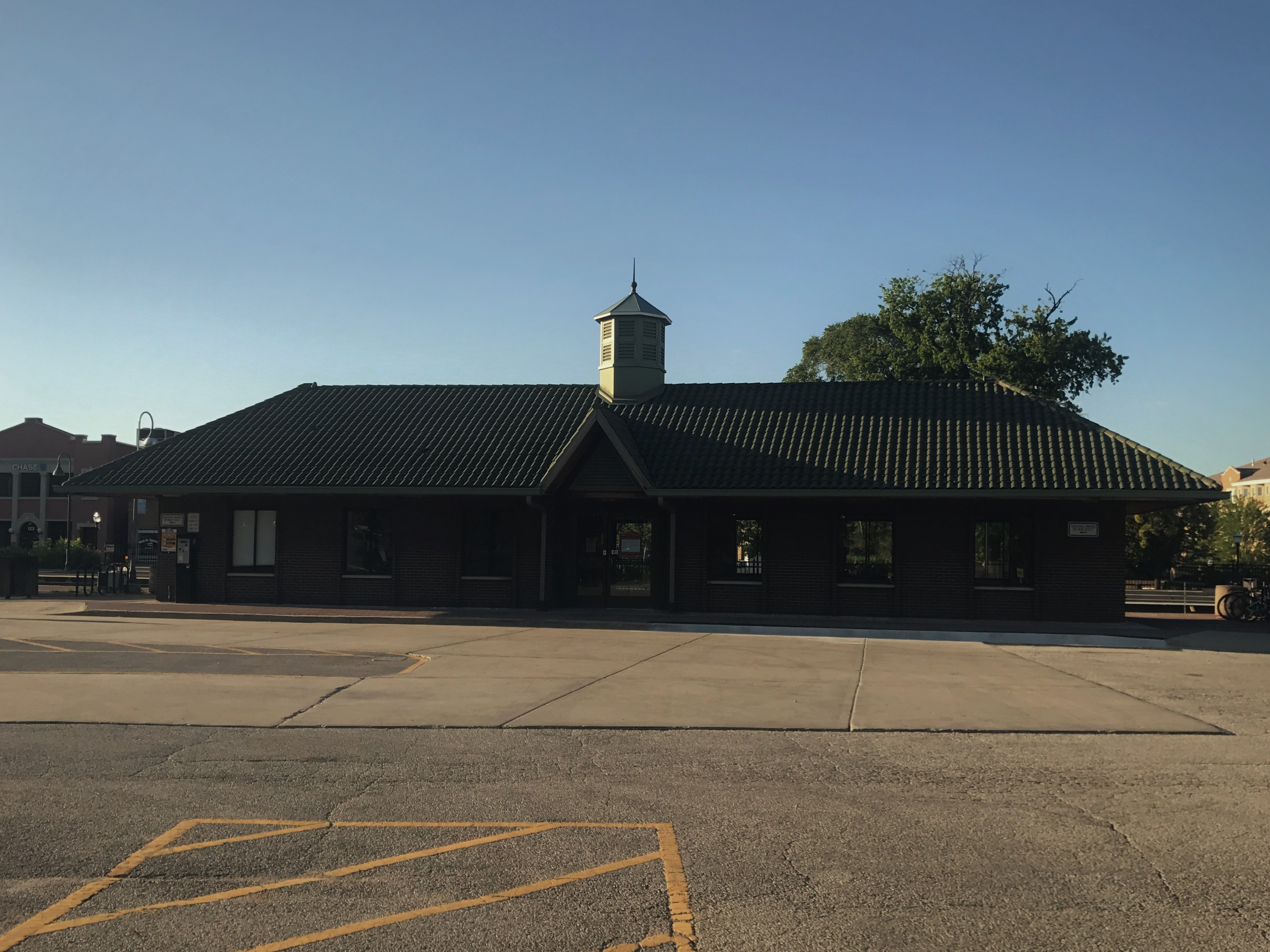
Bensenville station in June 2017.

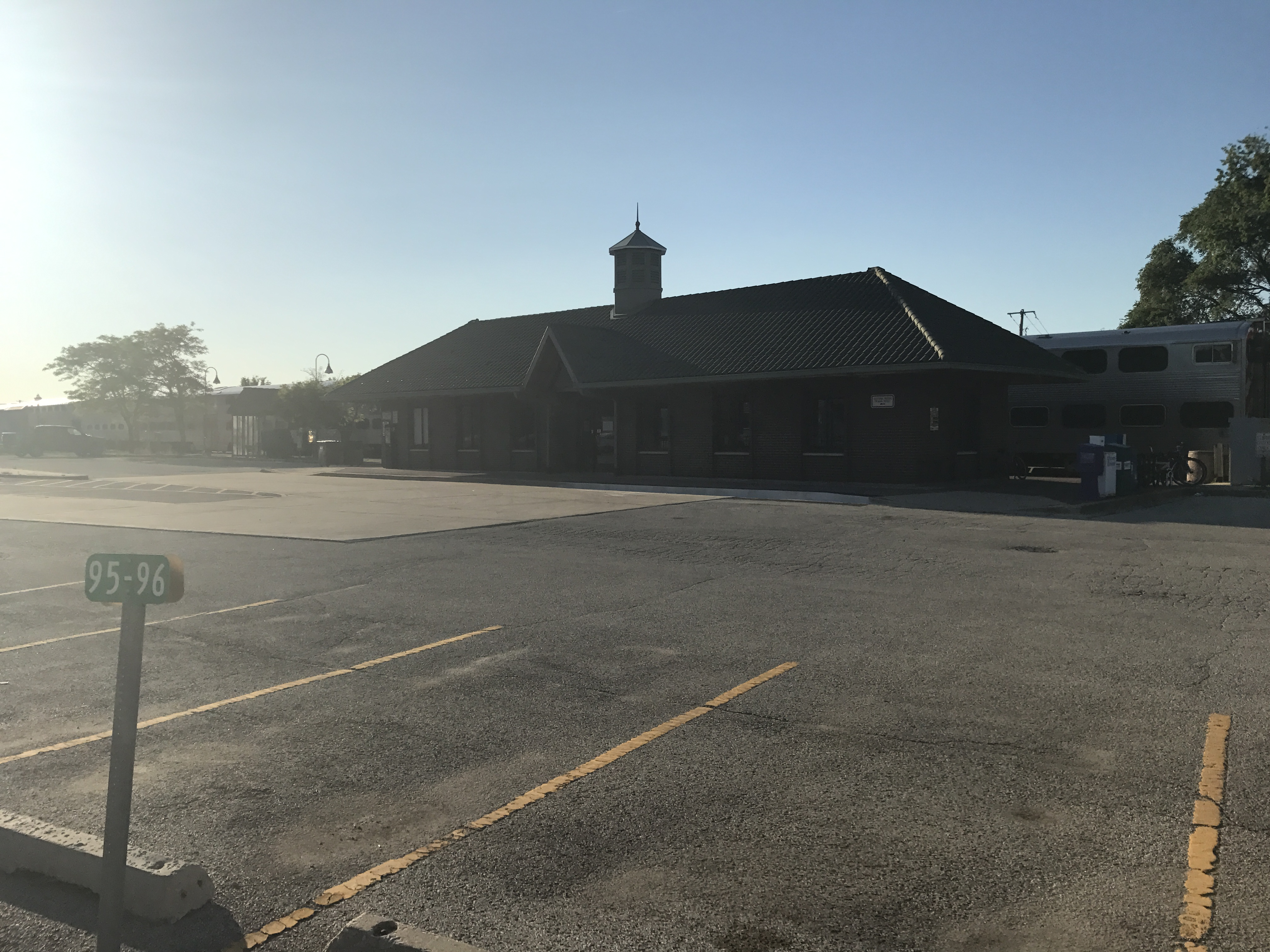
An east to west view of the station during the early evening.

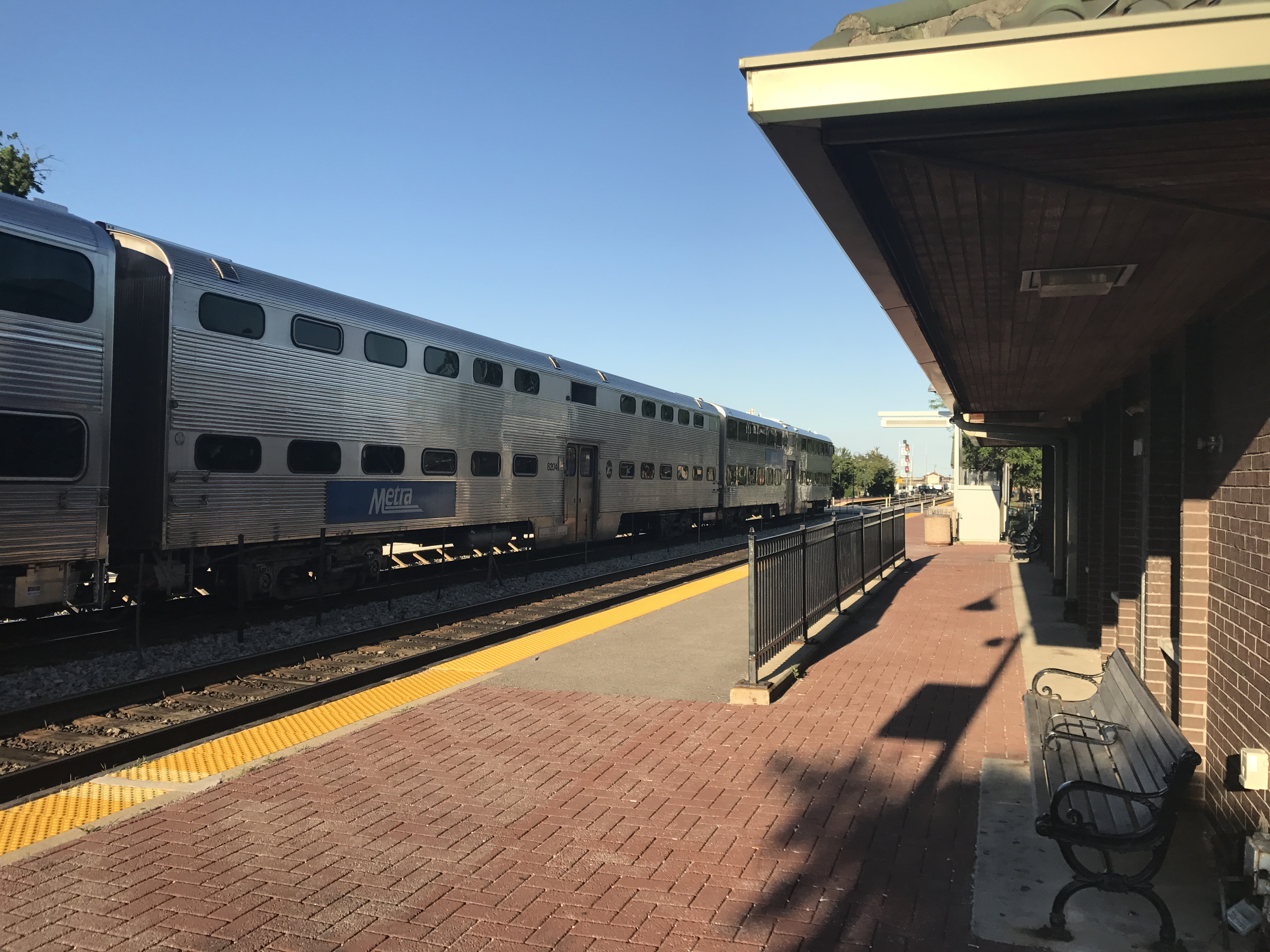
An outbound train towards Elgin stopped at the Bensenville Metra station.

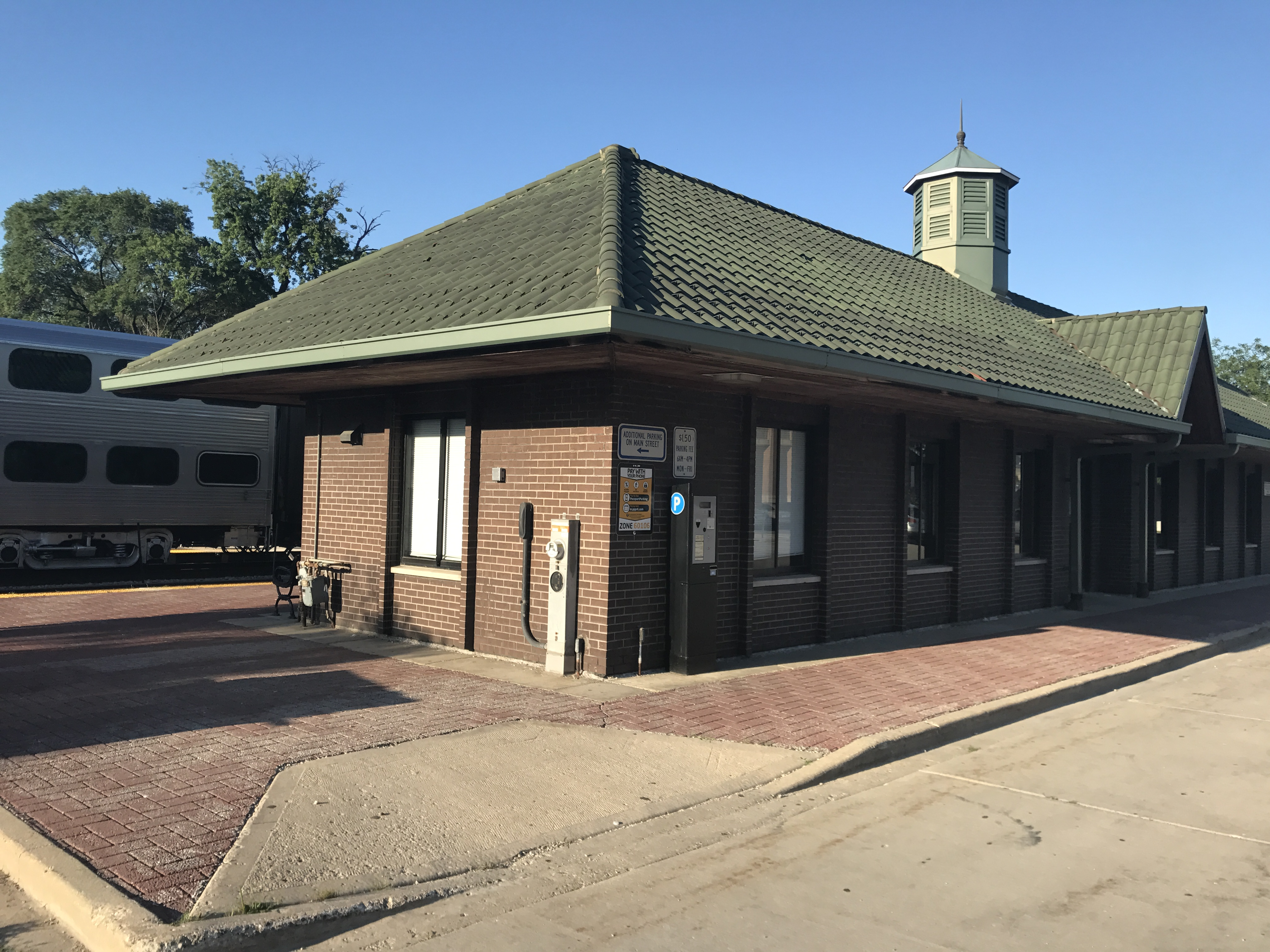
An outbound train towards Elgin stopped at the Bensenville Metra station.
