= Western Avenue station (Milwaukee District) =

Commuter rail station in Chicago, Illinois

Western Avenue

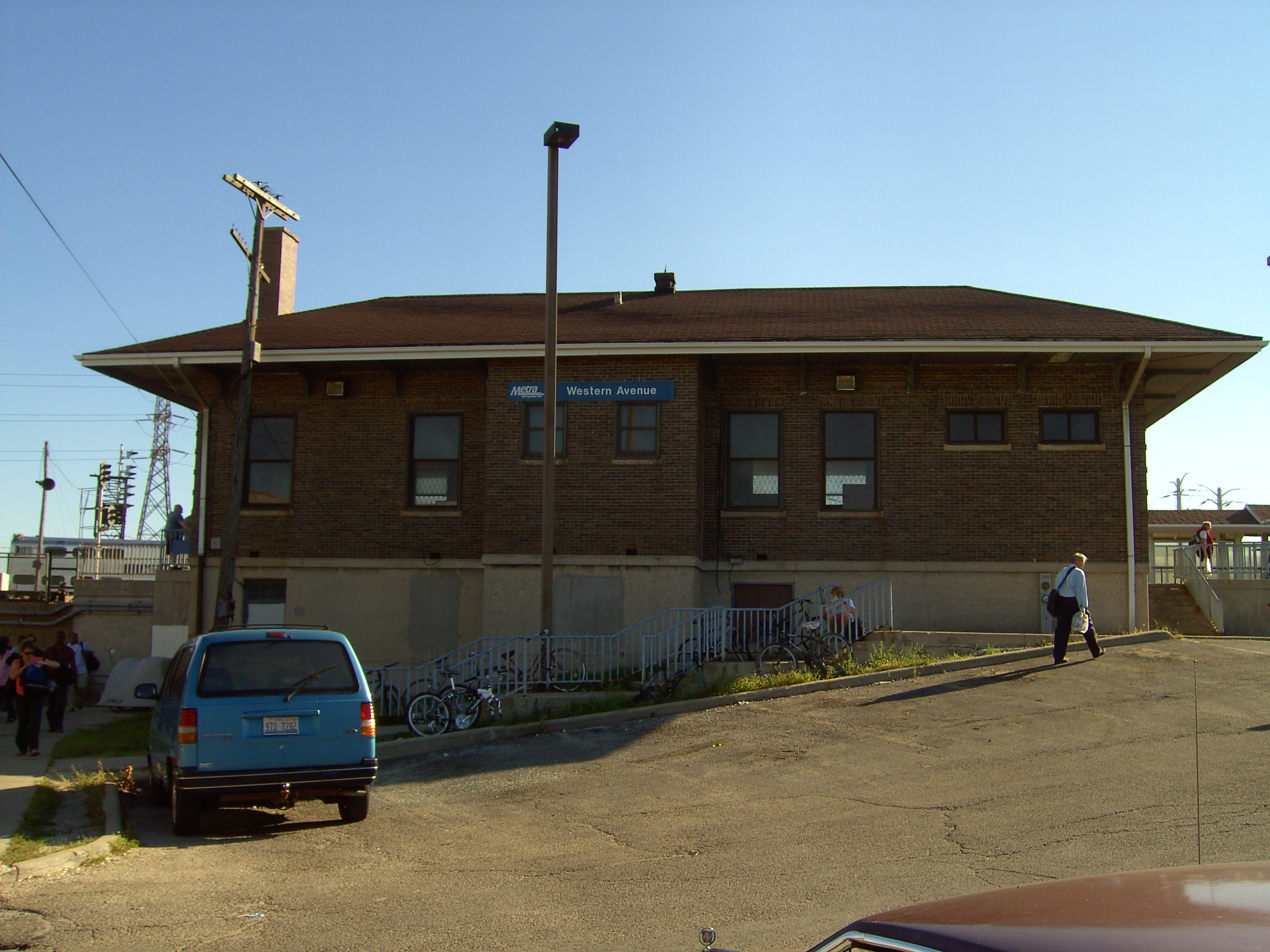
- Western Avenue station in September 2007.

General information
- Location: 420 North Artesian Avenue, near Grand Avenue; Chicago, Illinois 60612
- Coordinates: 41.8892°N 87.6881°W
- Owner: Metra
- Line: C&M Subdivision
- Platforms: 1 side platform, 1 island platform
- Tracks: 3
- Connections: Chicago Transit Authority

Construction
- Parking: Yes
- Accessible: Yes

Other information
- Fare zone: 2

History
- Opened: 1900

Passengers
- 2018: 836 (average weekday) ▲1.5%
- Rank: 61 out of 236

Services
Preceding station	Metra	Following station
Healy toward Fox Lake	Milwaukee District North	Union Station Terminus
Grand/Cicero Weekday Limited toward Big Timber/Elgin	Milwaukee District West	Union Station Terminus
River Grove toward Antioch	North Central Service	Union Station Terminus
Former services
Preceding station	Milwaukee Road	Following station
Deerfield toward Seattle or Tacoma	Main Line	Chicago Terminus
Elgin toward Omaha	Omaha – Chicago	Chicago Terminus
Healy toward Milwaukee	Chicago – Milwaukee	Chicago Terminus
Healy toward Walworth	Suburban Service North Line	Chicago Terminus
Hermosa toward Elgin	Suburban Service West Line	Chicago Terminus
Preceding station	Metra	Following station
Hermosa (Closed 2006) toward Big Timber/Elgin	Milwaukee District West	Chicago toward Union Station
Track layout
Location

Western Avenue is a railroad station owned by Metra, located in the West Town community area of Chicago, Illinois near Western Avenue. The station is 2.9 miles (4.7 km) away from Union Station, the inbound terminus of the line.

Western Avenue station serves the Milwaukee District West Line, North Central Service, and Milwaukee District North Line, and is the last inbound stop for these three lines before the terminus at Union Station. Although it is not a station stop, Amtrak's Hiawatha, Borealis, and the Empire Builder also pass through here. The station was previously used by the Chicago, Milwaukee, St. Paul and Pacific Railroad. Located near the station are the California Coach Yard, and the Western Avenue Rail Yard, the latter of which host to Metra's remaining EMD F40Cs. Just southeast of the station platforms is a diamond where the Milwaukee Road Metra routes cross the tracks of the Union Pacific West Line to Ogilvie Transportation Center, then turn to run parallel to them. This goes on for about a mile before they split, as the West Line tracks continue to Ogilvie. The junction is controlled by the nearby A-2 tower.

== Service ==
As of 2018, Western Avenue is the 61st busiest of Metra's 236 non-downtown stations, with an average of 836 weekday boardings.

Western Avenue is served by a total of 117 Metra trains on weekdays, by 44 trains on Saturdays, and by 36 trains on Sundays and holidays. This includes all inbound trains from the three lines, as well as all outbound trains save for one outbound Milwaukee District North Line train on weekdays.

== Bus connections ==
CTA

- 49 Western (Owl Service)
- X49 Western Express (weekday rush hours only)
- 65 Grand
