= Grand/Cicero station =

Commuter rail station in Chicago, Illinois

Grand/Cicero

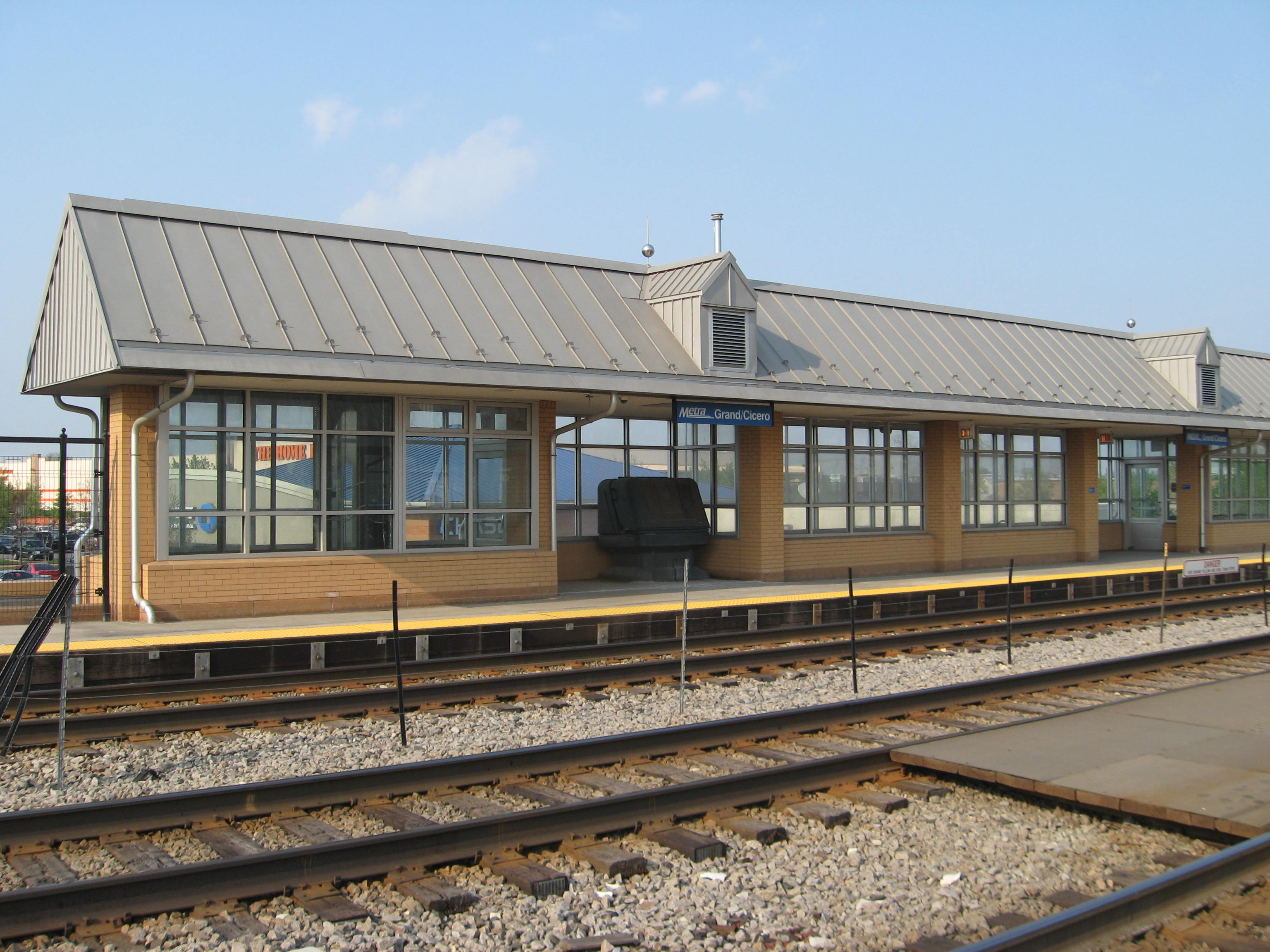
- Grand/Cicero station in May 2011

General information
- Location: 1833 North Cicero Avenue; Austin, Chicago, Illinois 60639
- Coordinates: 41.9144°N 87.7463°W
- Line: Elgin Subdivision
- Platforms: 2 side platforms
- Tracks: 4
- Connections: CTA Bus

Construction
- Accessible: Yes

Other information
- Fare zone: 2

History
- Opened: December 11, 2006

Passengers
- 2018: 80 (average weekday) ▼16.7%
- Rank: 199 out of 236

Services
Preceding station	Metra	Following station
Hanson Park Weekday Limited toward Big Timber/Elgin	Milwaukee District West	Western Avenue toward Union Station
North Central Service does not stop here
Track layout
Location

Grand/Cicero is a commuter railroad station in the Austin neighborhood on the West Side of Chicago and is 6.5 miles (10.5 km) away from Chicago Union Station, the eastern terminus of the line. As of 2018, Grand/Cicero is the 199th busiest of Metra's 236 non-downtown stations, with an average of 80 weekday boardings. The station is located at the corner of West Grand Avenue and North Cicero Avenue. Service to the station began on December 11, 2006. The station is served by the Milwaukee District West Line. Metra's North Central Service trains use these tracks but do not stop. Grand/Cicero station is closed on weekends, holidays, and after 6:30 P.M.

As of February 15, 2024, Grand/Cicero is served as a flag stop by 16 trains (10 inbound, six outbound) on weekdays only.

The opening of Grand/Cicero was accompanied by the closure of two other stations, Cragin and Hermosa. These stations were located nearby in residential neighborhoods. The station is also in the vicinity of a section of the Belt Railway of Chicago.

Chicago's first Walmart, at 4650 West North Avenue, opened just south of this station in September 2006.

== Bus connections ==
CTA

- 54 Cicero
- 65 Grand
- 73 Armitage
