= Cragin =

Cragin may refer to:

- Cragin station, a former transit station in Chicago, Illinois
- Aaron H. Cragin, United States Representative and Senator from New Hampshire
- Charles Cragin, American politician
- William Cragin, American tennis player

== See also ==
- Belmont Cragin, Chicago
