= Mars station (Illinois) =

Commuter rail station in Chicago, Illinois

Mars

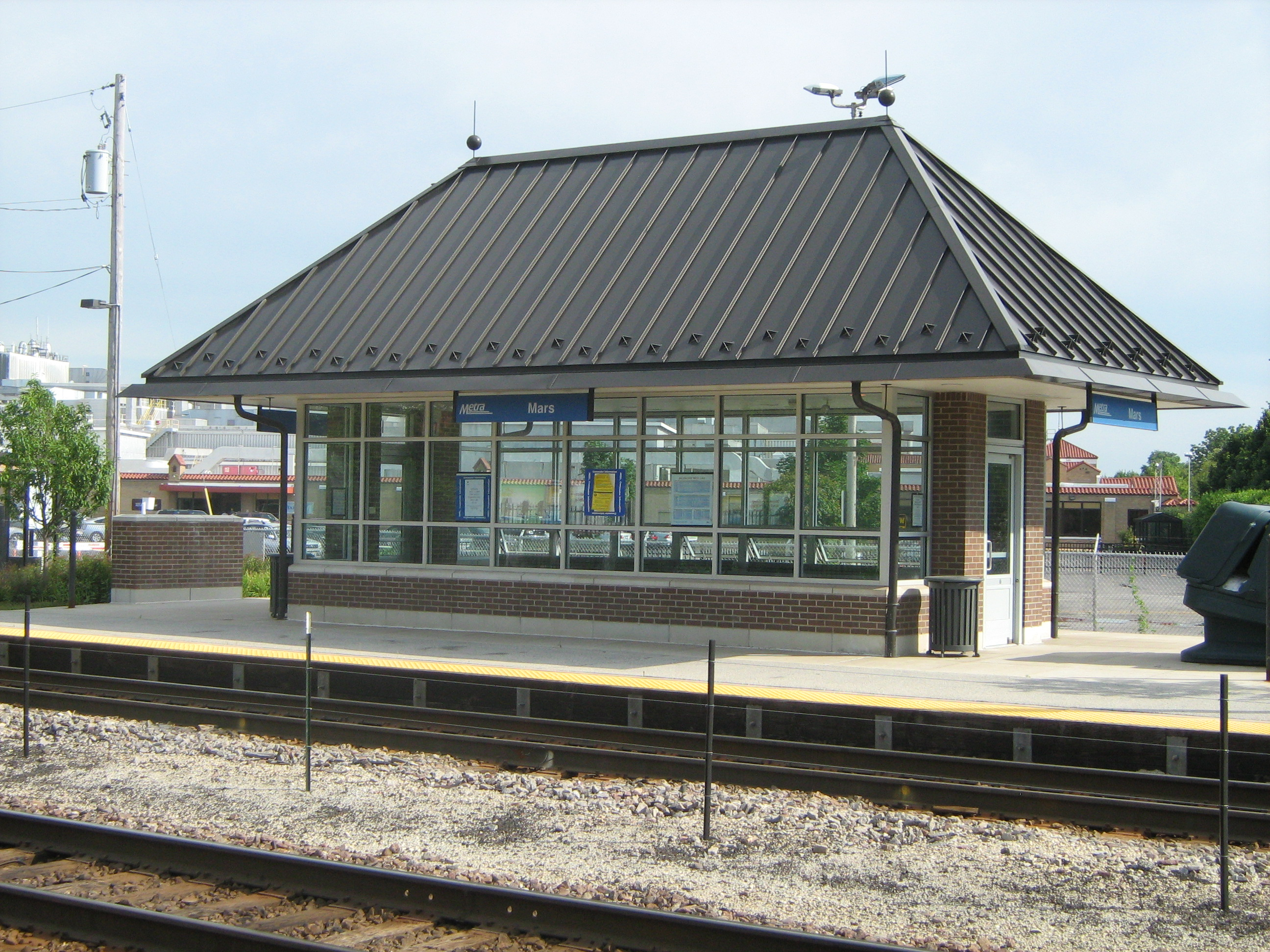
- The station building, with the Mars, Incorporated Factory in the Background

General information
- Location: 6801 West Shakespeare Avenue; Chicago, Illinois 60707
- Coordinates: 41.9191°N 87.7945°W
- Line: Elgin Subdivision
- Platforms: 2 side platforms
- Tracks: 3

Construction
- Parking: Yes
- Accessible: Yes

Other information
- Fare zone: 2

History
- Opened: 1956
- Rebuilt: 2001

Passengers
- 2018: 144 (average weekday) ▲1.4%
- Rank: 175 out of 236

Services
Preceding station	Metra	Following station
Mont Clare toward Big Timber/Elgin	Milwaukee District West	Galewood toward Union Station
North Central Service does not stop here
Former services
Preceding station	Milwaukee Road	Following station
Mont Clare toward Elgin	Suburban Service West Line	Galewood toward Chicago
Track layout
Location

Mars is a station on Metra's Milwaukee District West Line in Chicago, Illinois. The station is 9.1 miles (14.6 km) away from Chicago Union Station, the eastern terminus of the line. In Metra's zone-based fare system, Mars is in zone 2. As of 2018, Mars is the 175th busiest of Metra's 236 non-downtown stations, with an average of 144 weekday boardings.

As of February 15, 2024, Mars is served as a flag stop by 15 trains (nine inbound, six outbound) on weekdays only.

Mars station consists of three tracks and two side platforms. The middle track has no platform, so stopping trains must use the outer tracks. Metra's North Central Service trains use the tracks but do not stop.

The station is named for the now-closed Mars, Incorporated candy factory located on Oak Park Avenue in the Galewood neighborhood, right behind the station. The Chicago Park District's Rutherford Sayre Park immediately sits west of the station. A Shriners children's hospital sits to the north of the station.
