= Mannheim station (Illinois) =

Commuter rail station in Illinois

Mannheim

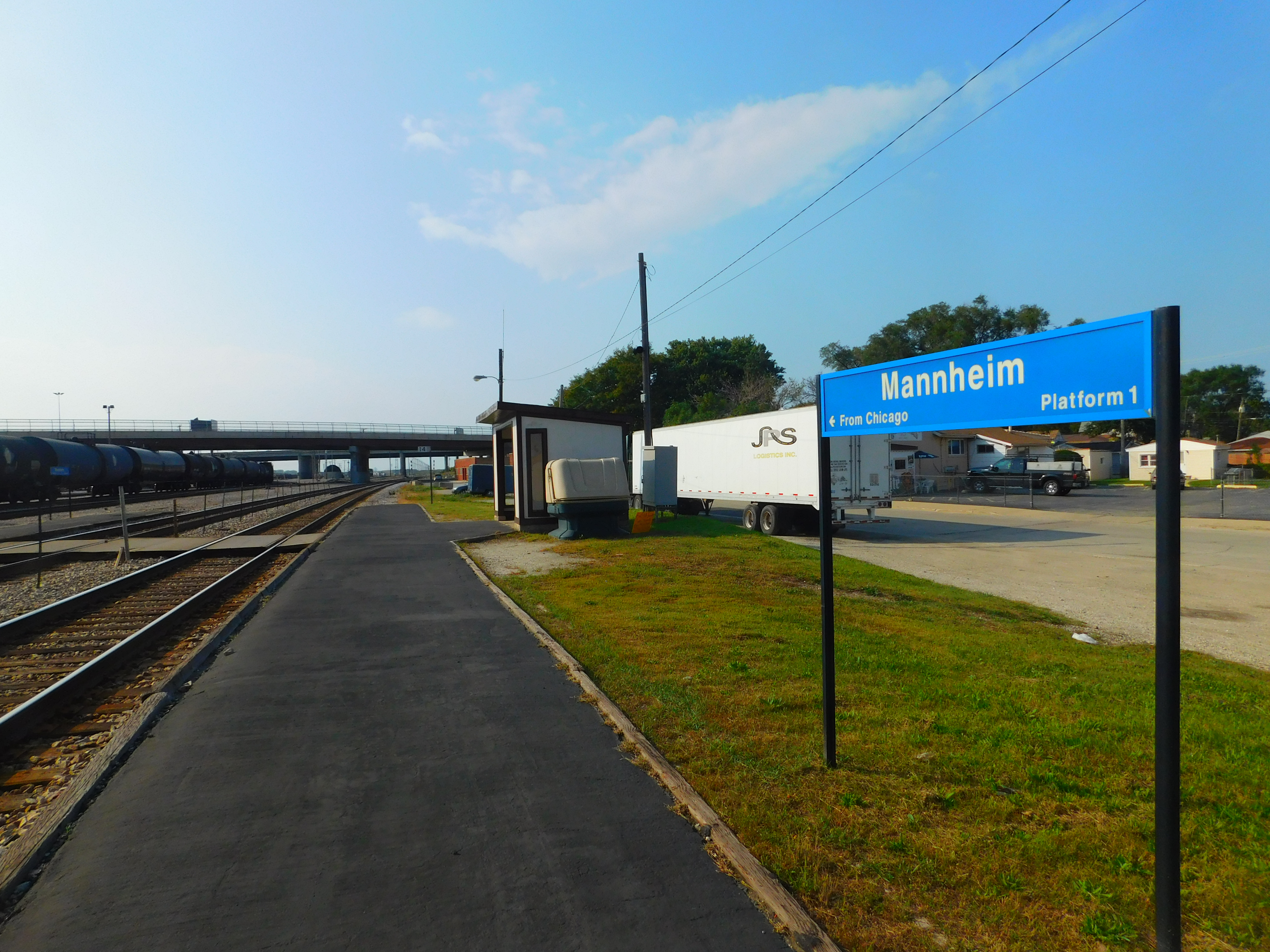
- Mannheim station in September 2016. Mannheim Road is in the background.

General information
- Location: Front Street and Lincoln Street; Franklin Park, Illinois
- Coordinates: 41.9416°N 87.8833°W
- Owner: CPKC Limited
- Line: Elgin Subdivision
- Platforms: 2 side platforms
- Tracks: 2
- Connections: Pace Buses

Construction
- Parking: Yes
- Accessible: No

Other information
- Fare zone: 2

History
- Opened: 1873

Passengers
- 2018: 35 (average weekday) ▲12.9%
- Rank: 218 out of 236

Services
Preceding station	Metra	Following station
Bensenville toward Big Timber/Elgin	Milwaukee District West	Franklin Park toward Union Station
Former services
Preceding station	Milwaukee Road	Following station
Bensenville toward Elgin	Suburban Service West Line	Franklin Park toward Chicago
Track layout
Location

Mannheim is a station on Metra's Milwaukee District West Line in Franklin Park, Illinois. The station is primarily served during rush hours as a flag stop. The station is 14.0 miles (22.5 km) away from Chicago Union Station, the eastern terminus of the line. In Metra's zone-based fare system, Mannheim is in zone 2. As of 2018, Mannheim is the 218th busiest of Metra's 236 non-downtown stations, with an average of 35 weekday boardings. It is the only non-ADA-accessible station on the Milwaukee District West Line. The Tri-State Tollway also runs adjacent to the Mannheim station.

As of February 15, 2024, Mannheim is served as a flag stop by 12 trains (eight inbound, four outbound) on weekdays only.

Mannheim station is little more than a wooden shelter, which is smaller than Hanson Park further east. The station lies on the south side of Front Street between Lincoln and Ernst Streets. Parking is available on the north side of Front Street along the same block. It is just east of the large CPKC Bensenville Yard, which sits to the south of O'Hare International Airport.

This station originally served as a milk stop for the village of Mannheim, Illinois. Mannheim was founded in the 1870s when the railroad was built through the area and was later annexed into Franklin Park.

== Bus connections ==
Pace

- "Route 319 – Grand Avenue". PaceBus.com. Chicago: Pace Suburban Bus Service.
- "Route 330 – Mannheim/LaGrange Roads". PaceBus.com. Chicago: Pace Suburban Bus Service.
