= Hermosa station =

Former commuter rail station in Chicago, Illinois

Hermosa

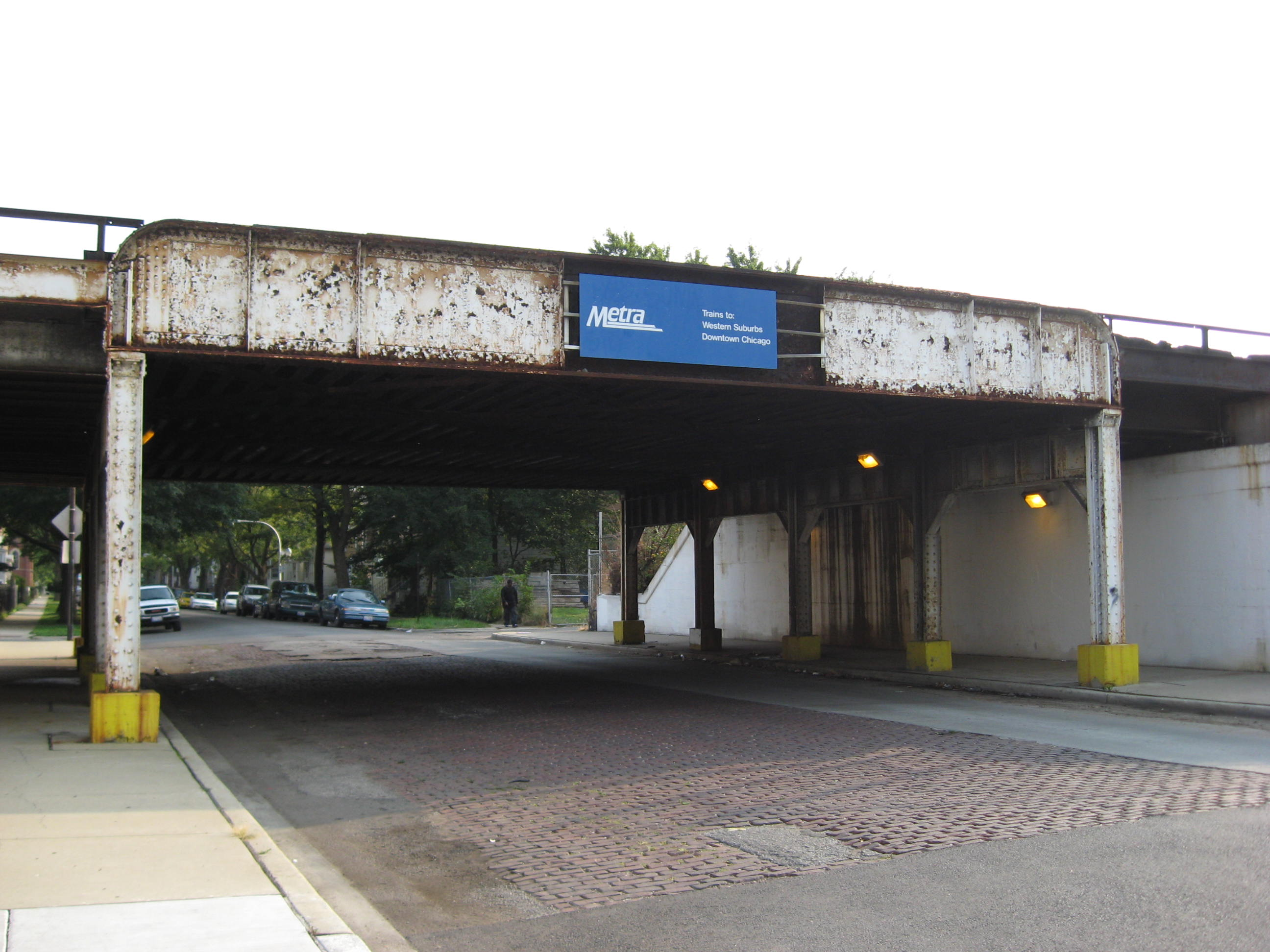
- Site of the former Hermosa Metra station

General information
- Location: 1800 North Keeler Avenue; Chicago, Illinois 60639
- Coordinates: 41.9136°N 87.7319°W

Other information
- Fare zone: B

History
- Opened: 1910
- Closed: December 11, 2006

Former services
Preceding station	Milwaukee Road	Following station
Cragin toward Elgin	Suburban Service West Line	Western Avenue toward Chicago
Preceding station	Metra	Following station
Cragin toward Big Timber/Elgin	Milwaukee District West	Western Avenue toward Union Station
Location

Hermosa was a station on Metra's Milwaukee District West Line. The station was located at 1800 North Keeler Avenue in the Hermosa neighborhood of Chicago, Illinois. Hermosa was 5.9 miles (9.5 km) from Union Station, the eastern terminus of the Milwaukee District West Line. In Metra's zone-based fare system, Hermosa was located in zone B. On December 11, 2006, Hermosa and the nearby Cragin station were closed and replaced by the Grand/Cicero station, which is located between both former stations. Hermosa station was also used by commuter trains of the Milwaukee Road, the predecessor to Metra. Walt Disney's birthplace is located three blocks north of this station on Tripp Avenue. Hermosa was also the first station west of Metra's Pacific Junction (where the MD-W line joins the Milwaukee District North Line) which is a few feet from the station itself. Pacific Junction contains four tracks (three for Milwaukee District West trains going south to Chicago Union Station and one going north for Canadian Pacific Kansas City trains.)
