= Galewood station =

Commuter rail station in Chicago, Illinois

Galewood

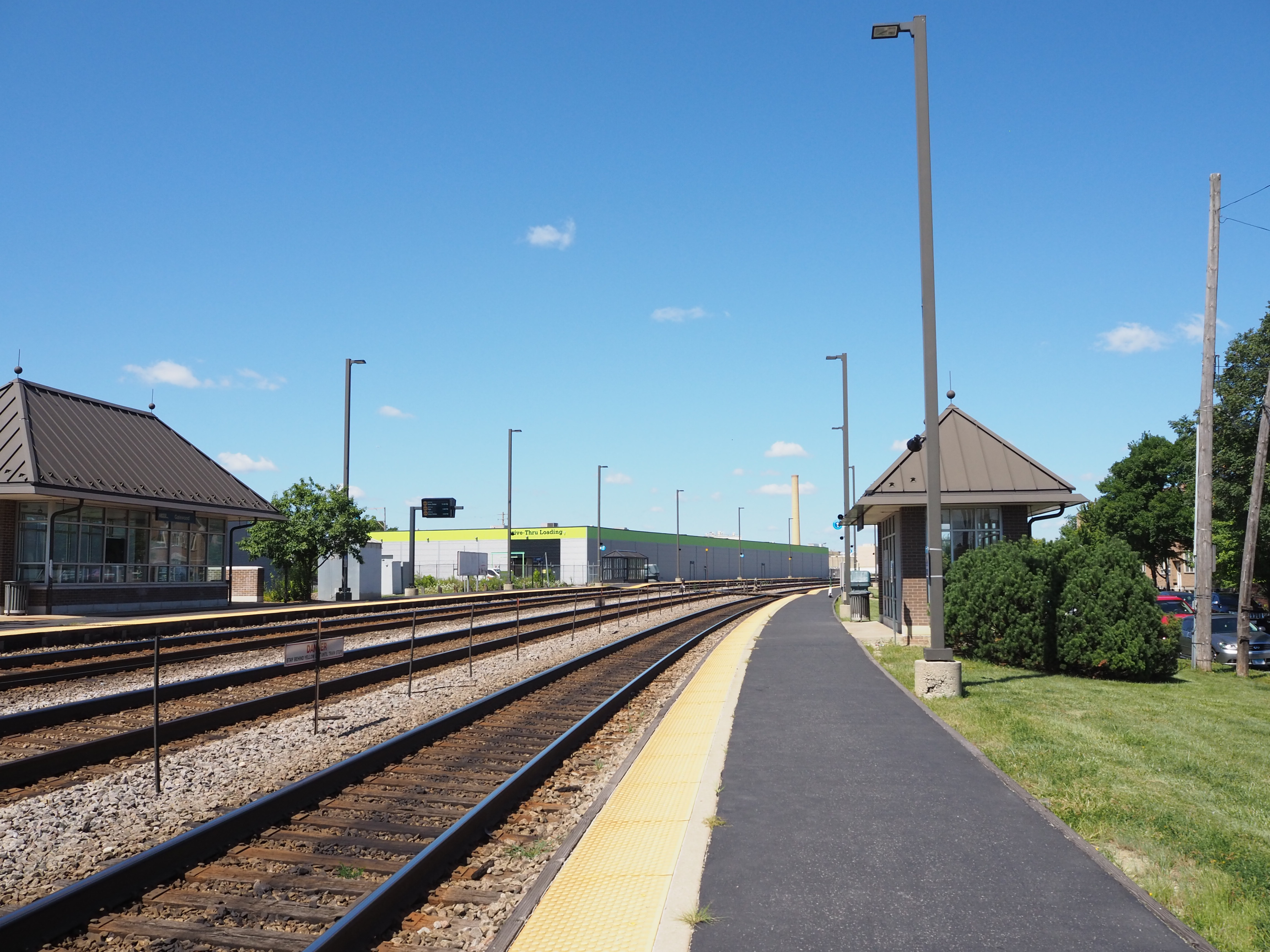
- Galewood station in August 2024.

General information
- Location: 2031 North Narragansett Avenue; Chicago, Illinois 60639
- Coordinates: 41.9163°N 87.7859°W
- Line: Elgin Subdivision
- Platforms: 2 side platforms
- Tracks: 3
- Connections: CTA Bus

Construction
- Parking: Yes
- Accessible: Yes

Other information
- Fare zone: 2

History
- Opened: 1910
- Rebuilt: 2001

Passengers
- 2018: 246 (average weekday) ▼11.8%
- Rank: 157 out of 236

Services
Preceding station	Metra	Following station
Mars Weekday Limited toward Big Timber/Elgin	Milwaukee District West	Hanson Park Weekday Limited toward Union Station
North Central Service does not stop here
Former services
Preceding station	Milwaukee Road	Following station
Mars toward Elgin	Suburban Service West Line	Hanson Park toward Chicago
Track layout
Location

Galewood is a station on Metra's Milwaukee District West Line in the Galewood neighborhood of Chicago, Illinois. The station is 8.6 miles (13.8 km) away from Chicago Union Station, the eastern terminus of the line. In Metra's zone-based fare system, Galewood is in zone 2. As of 2018, Galewood is the 157th busiest of Metra's 236 non-downtown stations, with an average of 246 weekday boardings.

As of February 15, 2024, Galewood is served by 40 trains (20 in each direction) on weekdays, by all 24 trains (12 in each direction) on Saturdays, and by all 18 trains (nine in each direction) on Sundays and holidays.

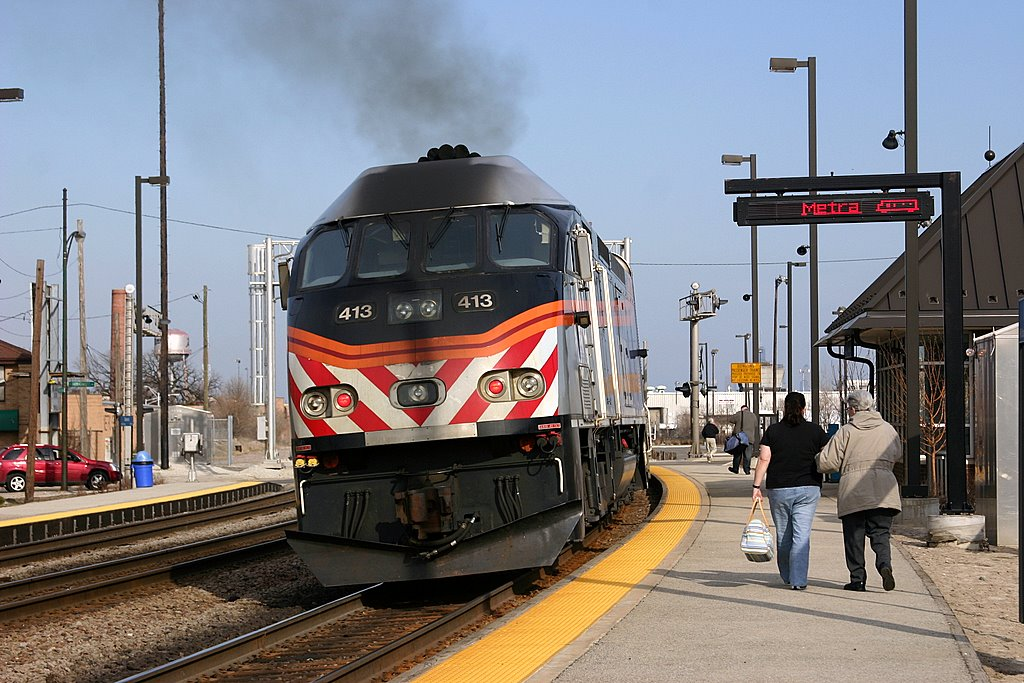
An MP36PH-3S pushing an inbound train in April 2008.

Galewood is located at grade level and consists of two side platforms which serve the outer two tracks. A third center track also runs through the station, to accommodate express trains. The tracks also carry Metra's North Central Service trains, though they do not stop at Galewood. A waiting room is available on the inbound side of Galewood station, but there is no ticket agent. This room has ample seating and is heated in the winter. An open shelter is on the outbound side of the station. Parking lots are located adjacent to and across the street from the station. Self storage businesses are located to the south of the station. A freight yard is located immediately east of the station. The land where the station now rests upon used to be where trackside utility poles were until circa 2000s when they were removed to construct the station, it was formerly located east of Narragansett Avenue.

== Bus connections ==
CTA

- 86 Narragansett/Ridgeland (weekdays only)
