= Western Entrance to the Riedbahn =

Railway line in Germany

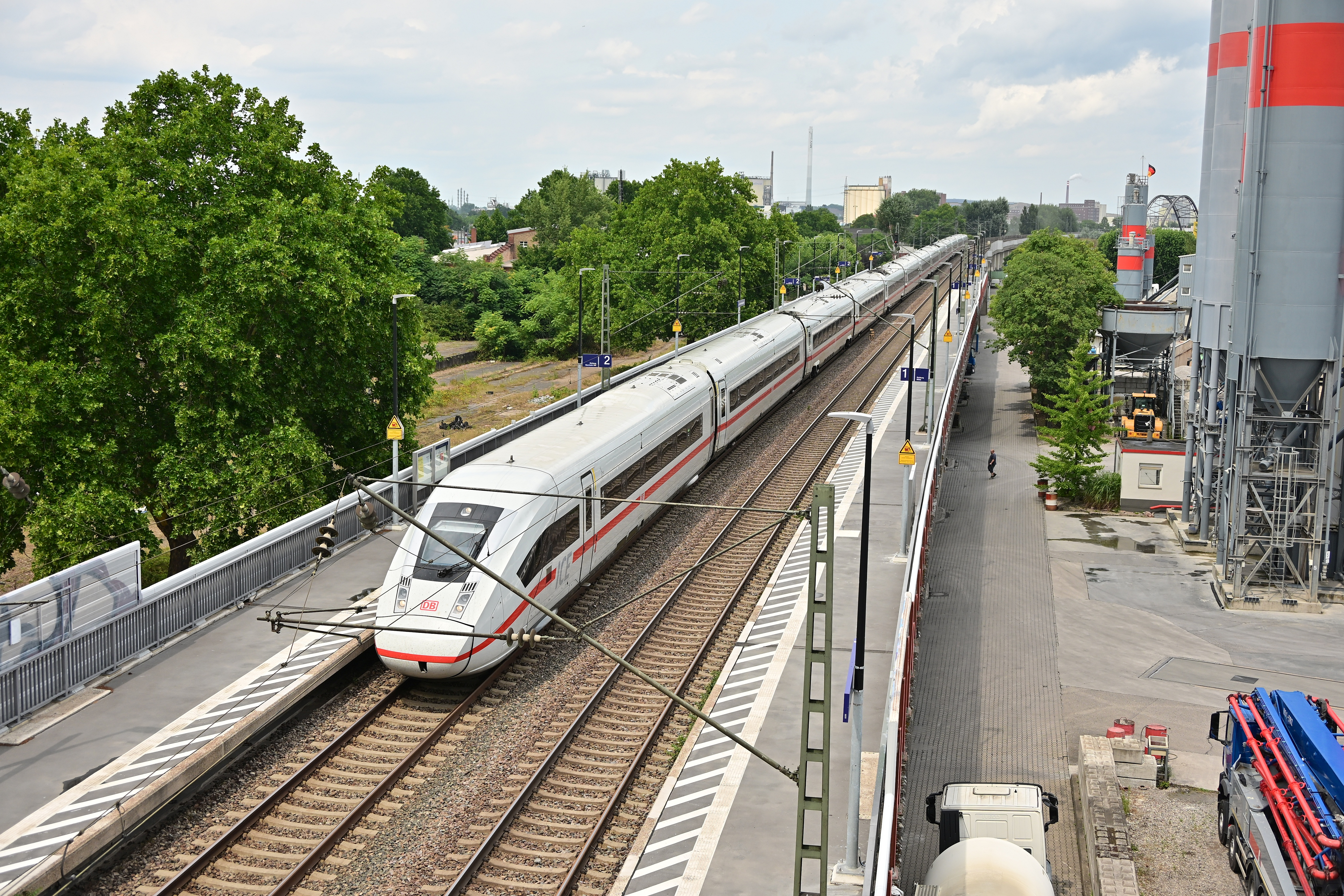
- ICE on the Western approach to the Riedbahn in Mannheim (2013)

Overview
- Native name: Westliche Einführung der Riedbahn
- Line number: 4011
- Locale: Baden-Württemberg, Germany
- Termini: Mannheim Hbf; Mannheim-Waldhof

Service
- Route number: 655

Technical
- Line length: 9.5 km (5.9 mi)
- Number of tracks: 2
- Track gauge: 1,435 mm (4 ft 8 1/2 in) standard gauge
- Electrification: 15 kV/16.7 Hz AC overhead catenary
- Operating speed: 160 km/h (99.4 mph) (maximum)
- Maximum incline: 1.3891%

The Western Entrance to the Riedbahn (Westliche Einführung der Riedbahn, WER) is a 9.5 km-long line in the German state of Baden-Württemberg, opened in 1985. It gives direct access from the Mannheim–Frankfurt railway (known as the Riedbahn) from the north to the western end of Mannheim central station, allowing trains to the east and the south (and vice versa) to continue without reversal.

== Description ==
The new line passes under the passenger and freight tracks of the Mannheim–Saarbrücken railway on the northwestern approach to Mannheim Hauptbahnhof and then runs over a 2,200 m long viaduct that crosses several intersecting roads in the port area. This viaduct is interrupted by two tied-arch bridges, one over a port channel, while the other is the Western Riedbahn bridge (Riedbahnbrücke West) over the Neckar. Adjoining the viaduct is an almost 2,000 m–long embankment, which is interrupted by a five-span prestressed concrete bridge; it lies partly on the route of the Riedbahn's approach to the original Riedbahnhof (Riedbahn Station) in Mannheim, which had been disused since 1971. It connects with the old Riedbahn (Mannheim–Frankfurt railway) at a level junction in Mannheim-Waldhof station, which was extensively adapted. Three new stations were built on the line to the west of Mannheim: Mannheim-Handelshafen, Mannheim-Neckarstadt and Mannheim-Luzenberg. The line follows the route of the Neckarstadtbahn (Neckar light railway), which was closed in the 1960s.

Heavy and slow freight trains still use the original (eastern) approach to the Riedbahn.

The line has been built for a top speed of 160 km/h. The maximum gradient is 1.25% (apart from a 1.39% ramp at Mannheim Hauptbahnhof). In cross-section it has been built with a distance between the two tracks of 4.00 m and a formation width of 10.0 m. The line is now operable in the region of Mannheim Hauptbahnhof (to kilometre 1.4) at 60 km/h, increasing on the way to Handelshafen station to 120 km/h and on the rest of the line at 160 km/h. It is equipped with the traditional H/V signalling system and PZB train control system and from kilometre 5 and beyond with the LZB in-cab signalling and train protection system.

== History ==
=== Background ===
In an international treaty contracted in 1843 by the former states of Baden, Hesse and the Free City of Frankfurt, it was agreed that the preferred route of the planned Main-Neckar Railway (Main-Neckar-Bahn) would end in neither Mannheim nor Heidelberg. Instead the new line would run to Friedrichsfeld, which is between them. The Riedbahn, which was opened later and eventually developed into a direct line from Frankfurt to Mannheim, was apparently designed for through traffic from Frankfurt via Mannheim to the Palatinate rather than for traffic from Frankfurt via Mannheim to Karlsruhe.

The Baden Mainline, the first railway line connecting to Mannheim, came from the southeast, and as a result the central station was built to the southeast of the city centre. This caused a problem of connecting to the Riedbahn, which was opened to Mannheim from the north by the Hessian Ludwig Railway in October 1879. This originally came from Darmstadt, although later a direct connection from Frankfurt was built. The company built its own station, the Riedbahnhof (Ried station), on the northern outskirts of Mannheim, north of the current Kurpfalz bridge. This had no connection to the Baden Mainline. Through traffic to Mannheim Hauptbahnhof was not possible until 1880 when a bypass was opened via Käfertal to the Rhine Valley Railway, so that the Riedbahn now reached Mannheim Hauptbahnhof from the southeast. Continuing to Karlsruhe and Stuttgart, however, required locomotives to be unhitched and moved to the back of trains so that they could reverse direction.

Shortly before the First World War and in the mid-1920s it has been proposed that the Riedbahn be rerouted through the port area to reach the Hauptbahnhof.

Before the Second World War the city of Mannheim suggested in an expert opinion that the Riedbahn's approach to Mannheim be rerouted to the west via Lampertheim, Frankenthal and Ludwigshafen. The time advantage from removing the reversal of train would have been lost as a result of the extra 10 km of this route. Both the 1943 B3 program developed just before World War II and the more limited remodeling plans of 1950/51 contained an approach of the Riedbahn from the west to Mannheim Hauptbahnhof. The latter plans envisaged a 9.5 km long new line from Mannheim-Waldhof with a grade-separated junction in the station area. For cost reasons, the project was abandoned gradually in the early 1950s. Finally, after 1953, the city of Mannheim deleted this proposal from its plan.

Direct access from the Riedbahn to the Mannheim node was proposed in a study for the Executive Board of Deutsche Bundesbahn (DB) in 1964. The project was resumed in 1970, initially as a regional transport project of the State of Baden-Württemberg and the city of Mannheim. The Board of Directors of Bundesbahn agreed to the proposal in August 1970. A quadruplication of the tracks between Mannheim-Waldhof and Groß-Gerau would have complemented the "Western Entrance to the Riedbahn." This would have connected with the proposed Cologne-Groß–Gerau railway. Neither project was realised.

The reversals (including change of locomotives) in the early 1980s took at least six minutes and required numerous shunting movements; up to 3000 shunting movements were counted at Mannheim Hauptbahnhof each day. These circumstances led to frequent delays. The reversal of the trains required all station tracks to be crossed. The Western Entrance to the Riedbahn project was developed to resolve these problems.

=== Planning ===
Planning approval process
Planning zone	1	2	3
Line kilometre	0.0–0.9	0.9–5.9	5.9–9.5
Commencement	20 July 1978	21 March 1978 (first introduction 24 May 1971)	19 December 1978
Number of objections	0	15	1022
Public hearing	(none)	26 April 1978	31 March 1980
Planning approval	25 October 1978	5 March 1979	19 June 1981
Number of complaints	0	17	0
Legal effect	20 December 1978	6 October 1980	7 August 1981

The new line was divided into three sections for planning: the approach to the northwestern end of Mannheim Hauptbahnhof (section 1: 0.0 to 0.9 km), the line between km 0.9 and 5.9 (section 2) and the integration into Mannheim-Waldhof station (section 3: 5.9 to 9.5 km).

The first planning approval process was initiated in mid 1971. In 1972 a heads of agreement was signed with the City of Mannheim. The project was later managed as part of the Frankfurt–Mannheim upgraded line (Ausbaustrecke) project. In March 1977, the Management of DB put the overall project to the Board for consideration and it was adopted in May 1977. The benefit-cost ratio of the overall project was estimated to be 6.73. The City of Mannheim approved the Western Entrance to the Riedbahn project in November 1977. Transport Minister Kurt Gscheidle approved the construction of the 9.1 km long overall project on 7 September 1978. The estimated cost amounted to Deutsche Mark (DM) 230 million in 1975 prices, of which DM 12 million was attributed to regional transport improvements.

Planning was approved for the first section on 25 October 1978. Construction of the first civil engineering structures began in February 1979. The grade-separated entry into Mannheim Hauptbahnhof caused an extensive remodeling of the western approaches to Mannheim Hauptbahnhof, including all bridges. Works on this section did not affect the public.

Between 5 February and 5 March 1979, plans for the (northern) section 3 were developed in the Mannheim town hall. A citizens' initiative against the project had formed. It demanded, among other things, the relocation of the existing and the new railway facilities, the adjacent federal highway and the tram tunnel; the associated costs were calculated by Deutsche Bundesbahn as around DM one billion. The lowering of the railway tracks and a later lowering of the federal highway, which was also demanded, would have improved the poor conditions in the centre of the Waldhof district. DB found that an underground route would be technically feasible but financially unacceptable. The public hearing on this section, which was initially scheduled for 15 January 1980, was postponed to 31 January 1980 at the insistence of the concerned citizens, who criticised the date and type of notification. It finally took place at the end of March 1980. DB again refused the demands of most objectors for an underground route. A common planning approach by the city, state, federal government and Deutsche Bundesbahn eventually emerged in response to the demands of the citizens' initiative. Despite maintaining the above ground route, improvements could be achieved. Among other things, street signage would be changed, pedestrian links would be separated from the railway by noise barriers and the construction of freight facilities would be delayed. DB presented this solution in detail to the public and it was explained and discussed. This compromise was not opposed.

Planning of the (middle) section 2, was finalised on 6 October 1980. Its construction began in mid 1980. With the adoption of the zoning decision for the Mannheim-Waldhof area, the planning approval process was completed in August 1981. A total of 1,037 objections were received against the construction of the line and 17 actions were taken in the administrative court. These 17 individual actions were launched by the citizens' initiative. According to DB information all actions were settled by consensus.

At the end of May 1979, the Mannheim City Council approved the project, after DB had agreed to extensive soundproofing.

In the projections developed for planning in the late 1970s, an annual average of about 35 express trains and 35 local trains as well as 55 to 60 long-distance trains were expected each workday in both directions. While the local trains would serve all three proposed new stations, express trains would only stop at the Westkreuz station (km 2.1), which would provide the best link to the urban transport network.

=== Construction ===
Work began on the full length of the project in 1981. All construction on the line was completed in 1983. As part of the works three new stations (Luzenberg, Neckarstadt, Handelshafen) were built. Waldhof station was completely rebuilt.

Bridges

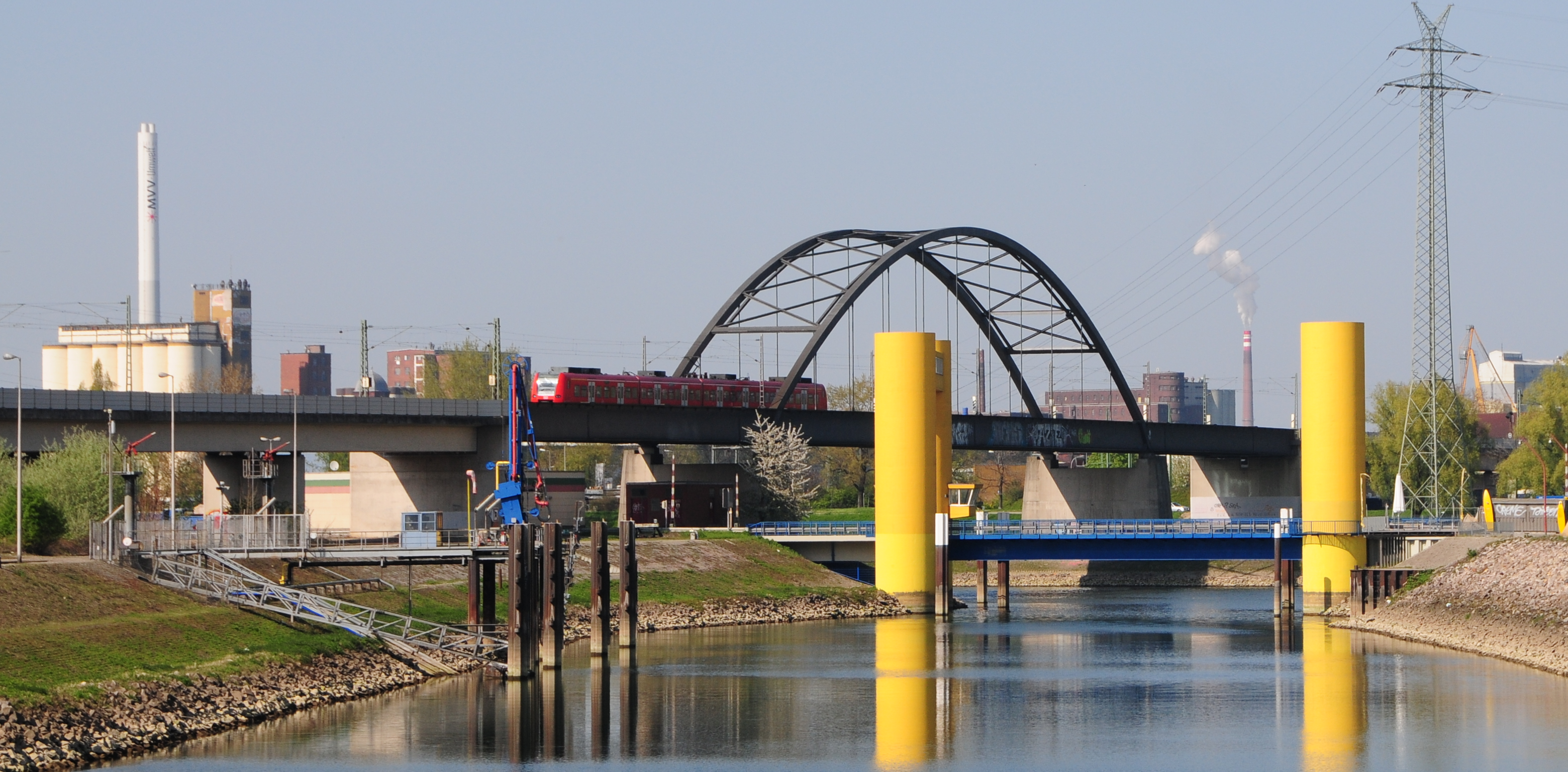
Across the Neckar

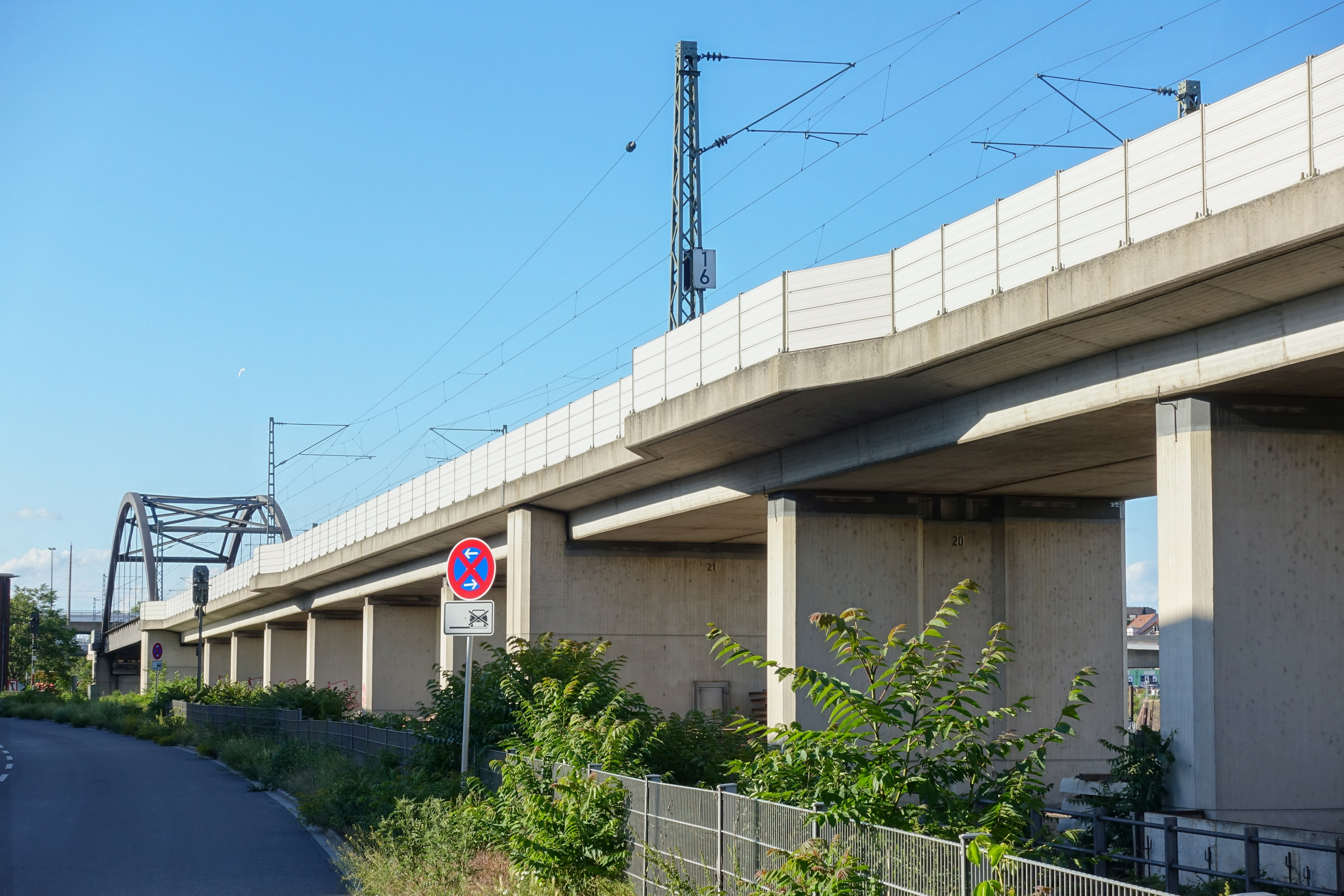
Elevated railway viaduct in the port area

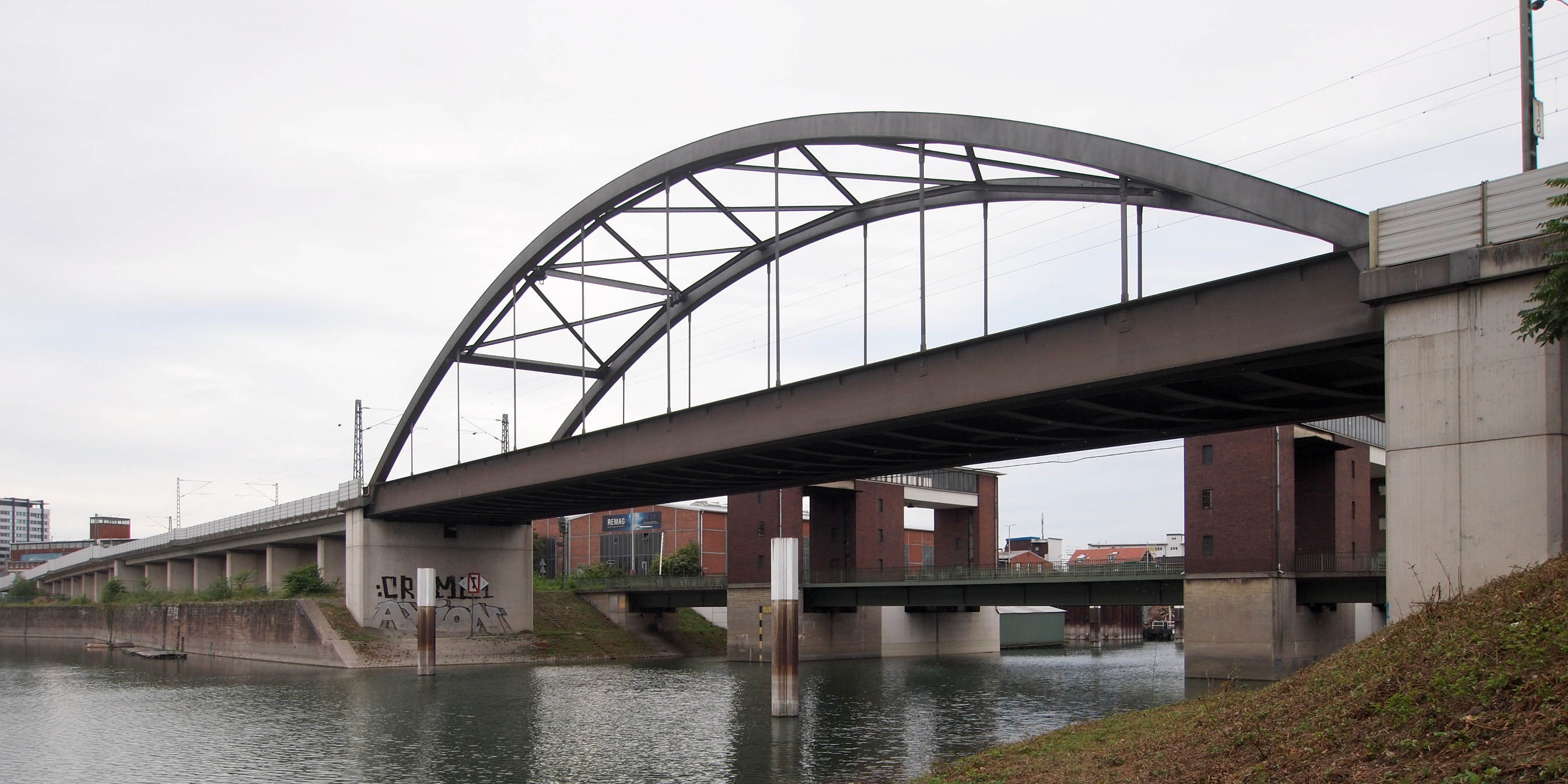
Bridge across the connecting canal

As part of the project, a new platform underpass equipped with escalators was built in Mannheim Hauptbahnhof and a new relay interlocking was put into operation in 1982.

=== Commissioning ===
Trial operations began in January 1985. In the spring of 1985, leaflets and films were issued on future operations on the line to help drivers acquire route knowledge.

The new line was inaugurated on 2 June 1985 by German Transport Minister Werner Dollinger.

With the commencement of operations, services were introduced at 20-minute intervals between Lampertheim and Mannheim Hauptbahnhof, operated with push–pull train; 36 to 38 trains ran daily to Schwetzingen or Hockenheim. Simultaneously, regional services on the eastern introduction of the Riedbahn were largely discontinued. A replacement bus service was established between Luzenberg and Käfertal.

With the commissioning of the Western Entrance to the Riedbahn, the journey time was reduced by around ten minutes. In combination with the new Mannheim–Stuttgart line to the south, the journey time between Frankfurt and Stuttgart was shortened by more than an hour.

=== Operations ===
Apart from regional services of the Verkehrsverbund Rhein-Neckar, the line is now served by three Intercity-Express routes connecting southern Germany with Berlin, Hamburg, Cologne and Dortmund. French TGV trains running between Frankfurt and Paris and Frankfurt and Marseille use the line.

== Costs ==
In the preliminary design, the construction costs (without planning costs) was estimated at DM 215 million at 1975 prices. 26 percent of this was for by land acquisition, compensation and preliminary work in Mannheim and another 31 percent was attributed to bridges. 20.5 percent attributed to substructure and superstructure, 3.5 percent for the local stations and 19 percent for railway technical equipment.

The planning cost was DM 260 million at the end of 1981. In mid-1982, the planning cost was DM 280 million (at 1981 prices), of which more than DM 140 million had been spent. Ultimately, the construction cost was DM 300 million. About DM 100 million had been spent by the autumn of 1981.

Almost DM 250 million had been spent by the end of 1984 out of a total of DM 290 million (1985 prices).
