= Cragin station =

Former commuter rail station in Chicago, Illinois

Cragin

General information
- Location: 1912 North LeClaire Avenue; Chicago, Illinois 60639
- Coordinates: 41.9154°N 87.7536°W

Other information
- Fare zone: B

History
- Opened: 1960
- Closed: December 11, 2006

Former services
Preceding station	Milwaukee Road	Following station
Hanson Park toward Elgin	Suburban Service West Line	Hermosa toward Chicago
Preceding station	Metra	Following station
Hanson Park toward Big Timber/Elgin	Milwaukee District West	Hermosa toward Union Station
Location

Cragin was a station on Metra's Milwaukee District West Line. The station was located at 1912 N. LeClaire St. in the Belmont Cragin neighborhood of Chicago, Illinois. Cragin was 7.0 miles (11.3 km) from Union Station, the eastern terminus of the Milwaukee District West Line. In Metra's zone-based fare system, Cragin was located in zone B. On December 11, 2006, Cragin and the nearby Hermosa station were closed and replaced by the Grand/Cicero station, which is located between both former stations. Cragin station was also used by commuter trains of the Milwaukee Road, the predecessor to Metra.
