= Hanson Park station =

Commuter rail station in Chicago, Illinois

Hanson Park

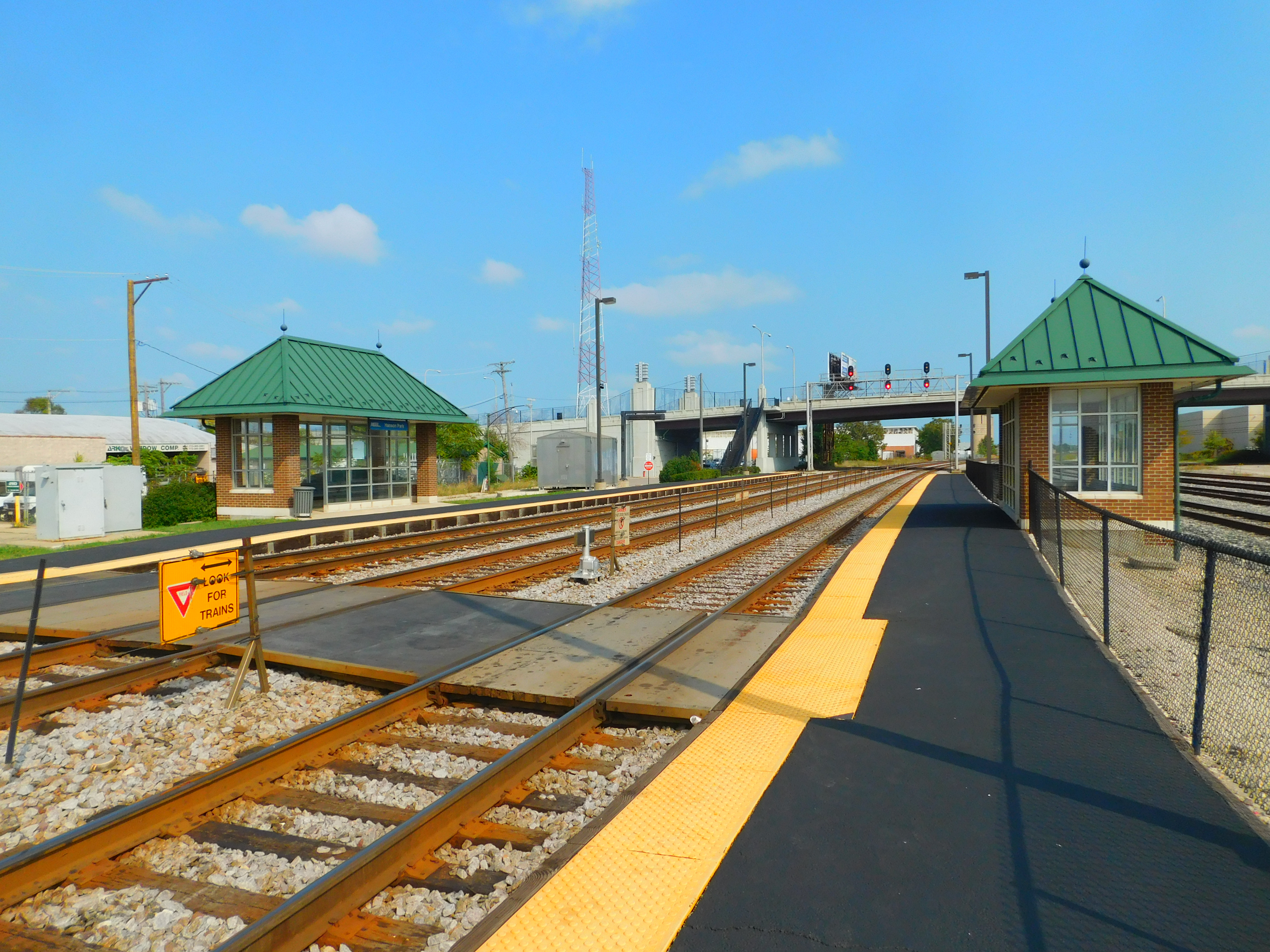
- Hanson Park station in September 2016. The bridge for N. Central Avenue is visible in the background. The holding freight railroad tracks are to the far right.

General information
- Location: 5621 West Armitage Avenue; Chicago, Illinois 60639
- Coordinates: 41.9168°N 87.7669°W
- Line: Elgin Subdivision
- Platforms: 2 side platforms
- Tracks: 3
- Connections: CTA Buses

Construction
- Parking: Yes
- Accessible: Yes

Other information
- Fare zone: 2

History
- Rebuilt: 1976, 2004

Passengers
- 2018: 58 (average weekday) ▼3.3%
- Rank: 207 out of 236

Services
Preceding station	Metra	Following station
Galewood toward Big Timber/Elgin	Milwaukee District West	Grand/Cicero Weekday Limited toward Union Station
North Central Service does not stop here
Former services
Preceding station	Milwaukee Road	Following station
Galewood toward Elgin	Suburban Service West Line	Cragin toward Chicago
Preceding station	Metra	Following station
Galewood toward Big Timber/Elgin	Milwaukee District West	Cragin (closed 2006) toward Union Station
Track layout
Location

Hanson Park is a station on Metra's Milwaukee District West Line in the Hanson Park neighborhood of Chicago, Illinois. The station is 7.7 miles (12.4 km) away from Chicago Union Station, the eastern terminus of the line. In Metra's zone-based fare system, Hanson Park is in zone 2. As of 2018, Hanson Park is the 207th busiest of Metra's 236 non-downtown stations, with an average of 58 weekday boardings. Metra's North Central Service trains use these tracks but do not stop.

As of February 15, 2024, Hanson Park is served as a flag stop by 15 trains (nine inbound, six outbound) on weekdays only.

Parking for the station is available on both sides of Armitage Avenue between Major and Parkside Avenues. The station is sandwiched between Metra's main line and several holding tracks for freight trains bound for either Bensenville Yard or the Belt Railway of Chicago at Cragin Junction where the Grand/Cicero station is located. Chicago Public School football games are held at Hanson Stadium, which sits north of the station. There is a bridge to the east of the station that carries Central Ave (5600 W.) To the far west of the station is the former (now abandoned) television factory for Zenith Electronics. Before this station was built, the area around it was mostly a gigantic railroad yard for the Milwaukee Road until circa 1970's when it was demolished and moved to Bensenville yard. However, the Glidden grain elevator, located east of North Central Ave., remained on the former site until the 2000s when it was demolished to make way for a new shopping complex, residential dwellings and government buildings. In the 1960s, Zenith Electronics purchased a site of the Galewood Yards from the Milwaukee Road to build its new headquarters.

== Bus connections ==
CTA

- 65 Grand
- 85 Central
