= Bensenville Yard =

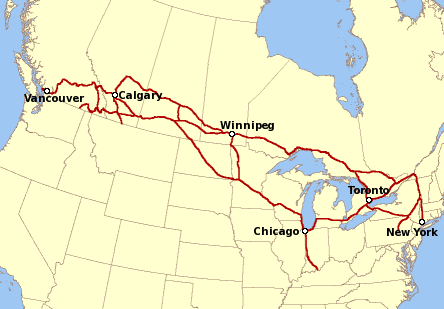
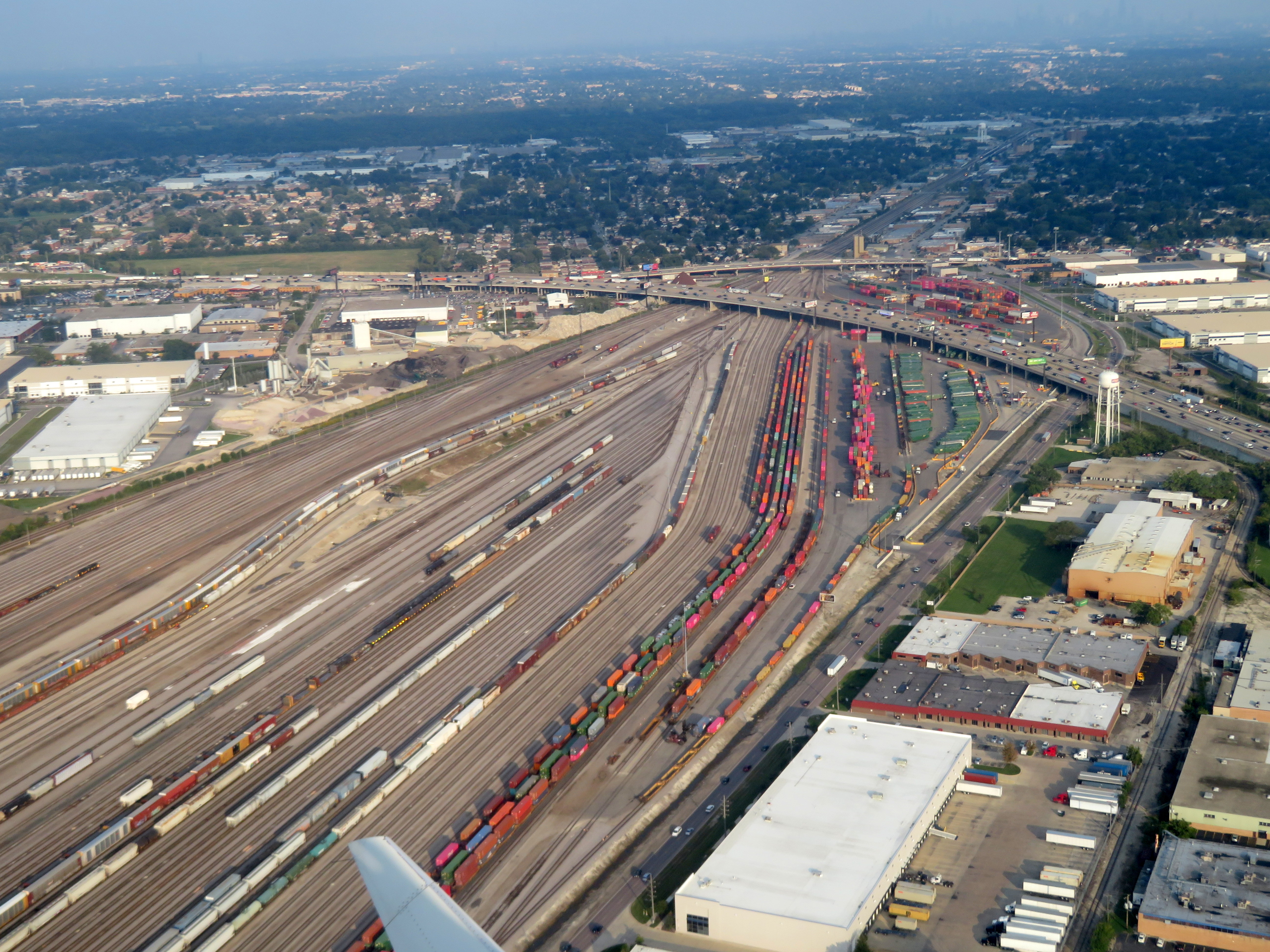
- Canadian Pacific Railway Eastern part of the marshaling yard with container terminal, 2019 (CPKC network top position, Chicago metropolitan area)

General information
- Location: Bensenville, Illinois, U.S. USA

History
- Opened: 1916
Location

Bensenville Yard is a Canadian Pacific Kansas City freight and switching yard located in Bensenville and Franklin Park, Illinois. It is located 15 miles (25 km) northwest of Chicago, below O'Hare International Airport. Its origins date back to the first freight yard of the Chicago, Milwaukee, St. Paul and Pacific Railroad (Milwaukee Road) in 1916, which by the early 1950s had grown into a large marshaling yard with 70 directional tracks. The Milwaukee Road was taken over by Canadian Pacific in the late 1980s, which rebuilt and modernized the facilities. Today, Bensenville Yard is CPKC's largest freight and marshaling yard (21 tracks on the western part and 34 on the eastern part; 55 tracks total) in the USA.

== History ==
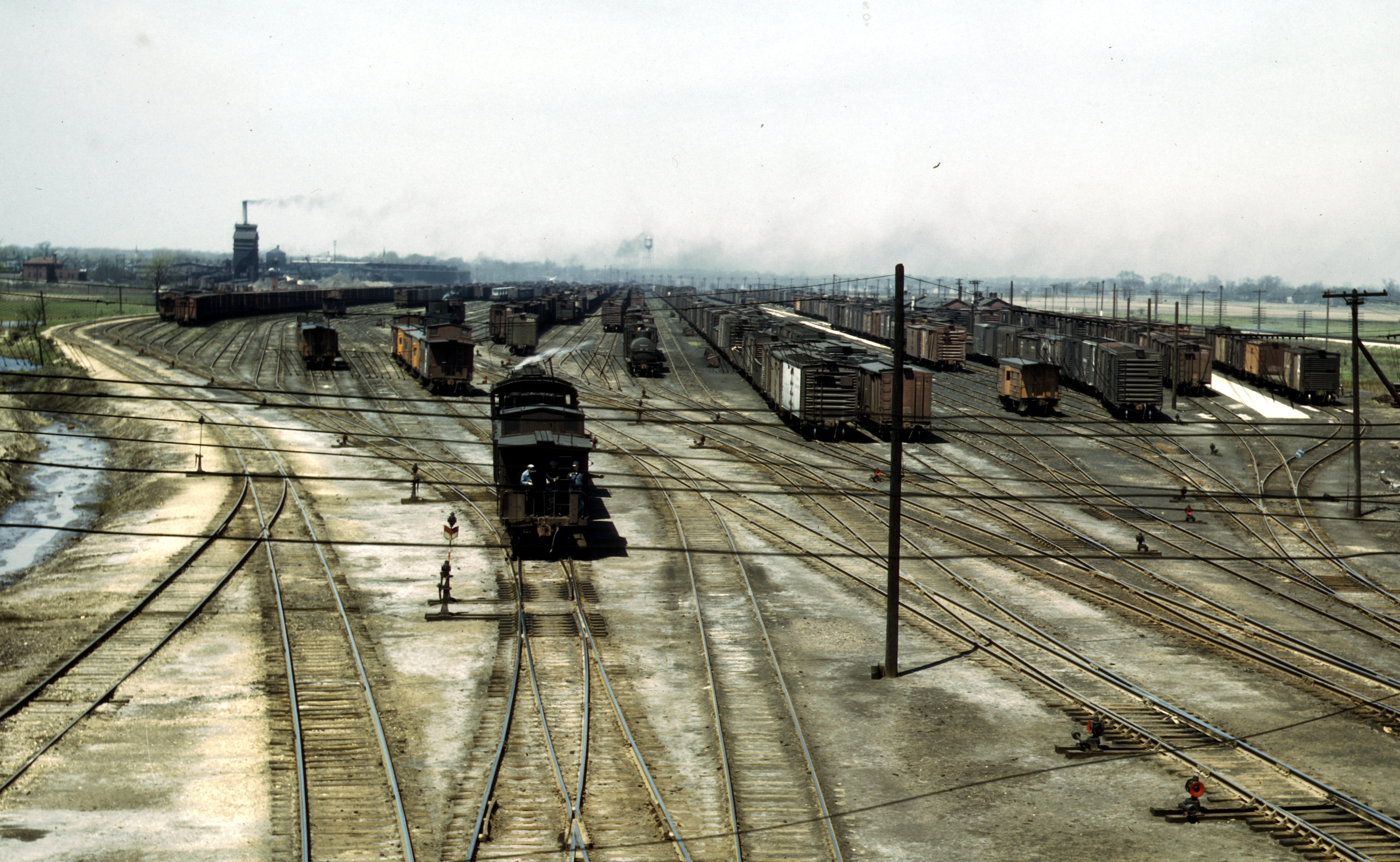
Bensenville Yard on the Milwaukee Road 1939 (Photo by Jack Delano)

As early as the 1870s, the Milwaukee Road, as it later became, operated a northwest connection from Chicago to Elgin. It passed through rural Bensenville. The first major freight station with an engine shed was built here by 1916, which was continuously expanded in the following years and made a significant contribution to the development of Bensenville. In addition, the Douglas Aircraft Company (later McDonnell Douglas) constructed an airfield and assembly plant north of the Bensenville Yard during the Second World War, which was subsequently developed into Chicago O'Hare International Airport.

Due to the strong increase in freight traffic during and after World War II, the Milwaukee Road expanded the Bensenville Yard into one of the world's largest marshaling yards with a total of 70 directional tracks by 1953. Covering an area of over 130 hectares, including the entry and exit group, it had around 200 km of track with a total capacity of almost 9,000 freight wagons. In 1958, the Milwaukee Road began piggyback transport of semi-trailers, which meant that the manual reloading of goods could be avoided. A loading station for flat wagons was built on the east side of Bensenville Yard for this purpose, covering an area of almost 19 hectares by the late 1960s. This type of handling in intermodal freight transport was later increasingly replaced by the emergence of ISO containers and the site was developed into a container terminal.

In 1986, the SOO Line Railroad took over the Milwaukee Road, which in turn was purchased by the Canadian Pacific Railway in 1990. The Bensenville Yard was rebuilt and modernized in the late 1990s. It is now Canadian Pacific's largest freight and marshaling yard in the USA with over 220,000 containers handled at the CP Rail Chicago Intermodal Terminal in 2016.

== Current system ==
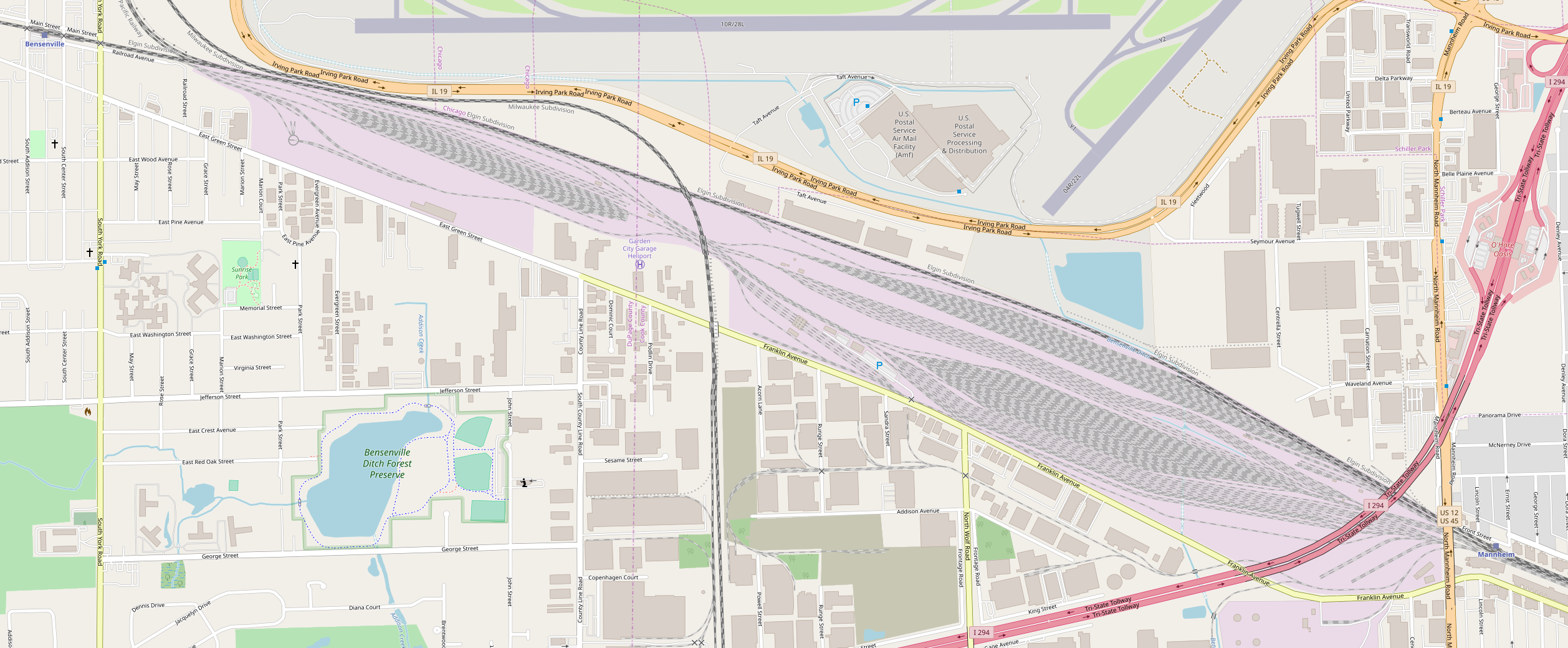
Location of the Bensenville Yard below Chicago O'Hare International Airport

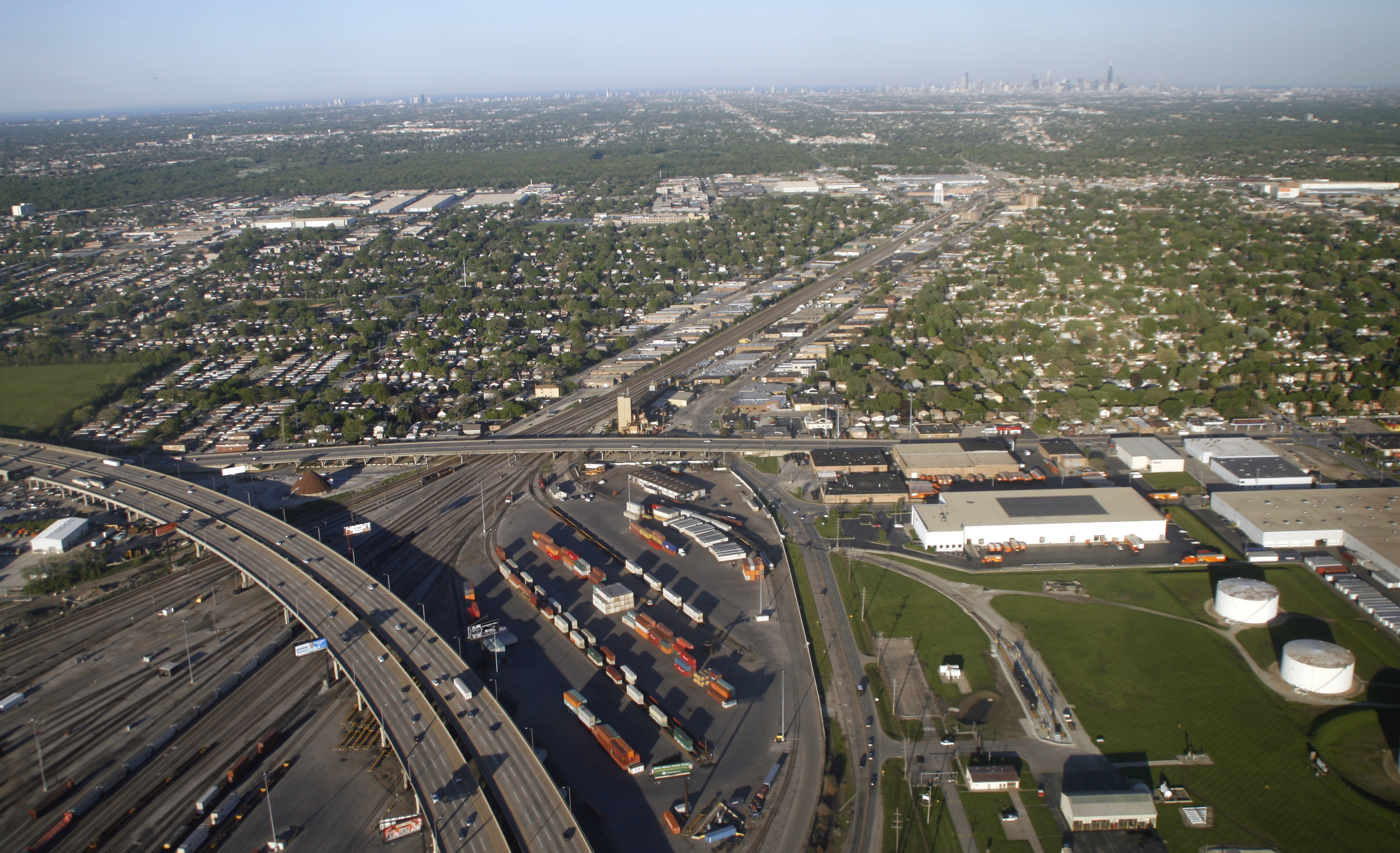
Container terminal on the east side in 2008; the Tri-State Tollway (I-294) has crossed the Bensenville Yard here since the 1960s

Today, the 5 km long Bensenville Yard is divided into an east and west section, between which the now-demolished hump and the signal box are located; two Union Pacific Railroad (formerly the Chicago & North Western Railway) tracks also cross the area here. In the western part, there is a marshaling yard with 21 directional tracks and the now-removed turntable of the old roundhouse with some access tracks. In the center of the larger eastern section is a marshaling yard with 34 directional tracks, flanked by tracks for incoming and outgoing trains and the tracks of the container terminal in the southeast, which together cover an equally large area with over 30 tracks. Running parallel to the yard is Metra's Milwaukee District West Line, which has a limited service station just east of the yard at Mannheim. The western half of the yard is in DuPage County while the eastern half of the yard is in Cook County.

Since the 1960s, the Tri-State Tollway (Interstate 294) has crossed the Bensenville Yard on the east side. As part of the planned expansion of the road network around O'Hare International Airport, a beltway (Interstate 490) will also run across the site of the old locomotive shed on the west side and cross the outer end of the rail yard there.

== See also ==
- List of marshaling yards
- Stations in Chicago
- CPR Toronto Yard

== Bibliography ==
- Engineering Department Employee’s Handbook. Chicago, Milwaukee, St. Paul and Pacific Railroad, 1969.
