= Mannheim-Handelshafen station =

Railway station in Mannheim, Germany

Mannheim Handelshafen
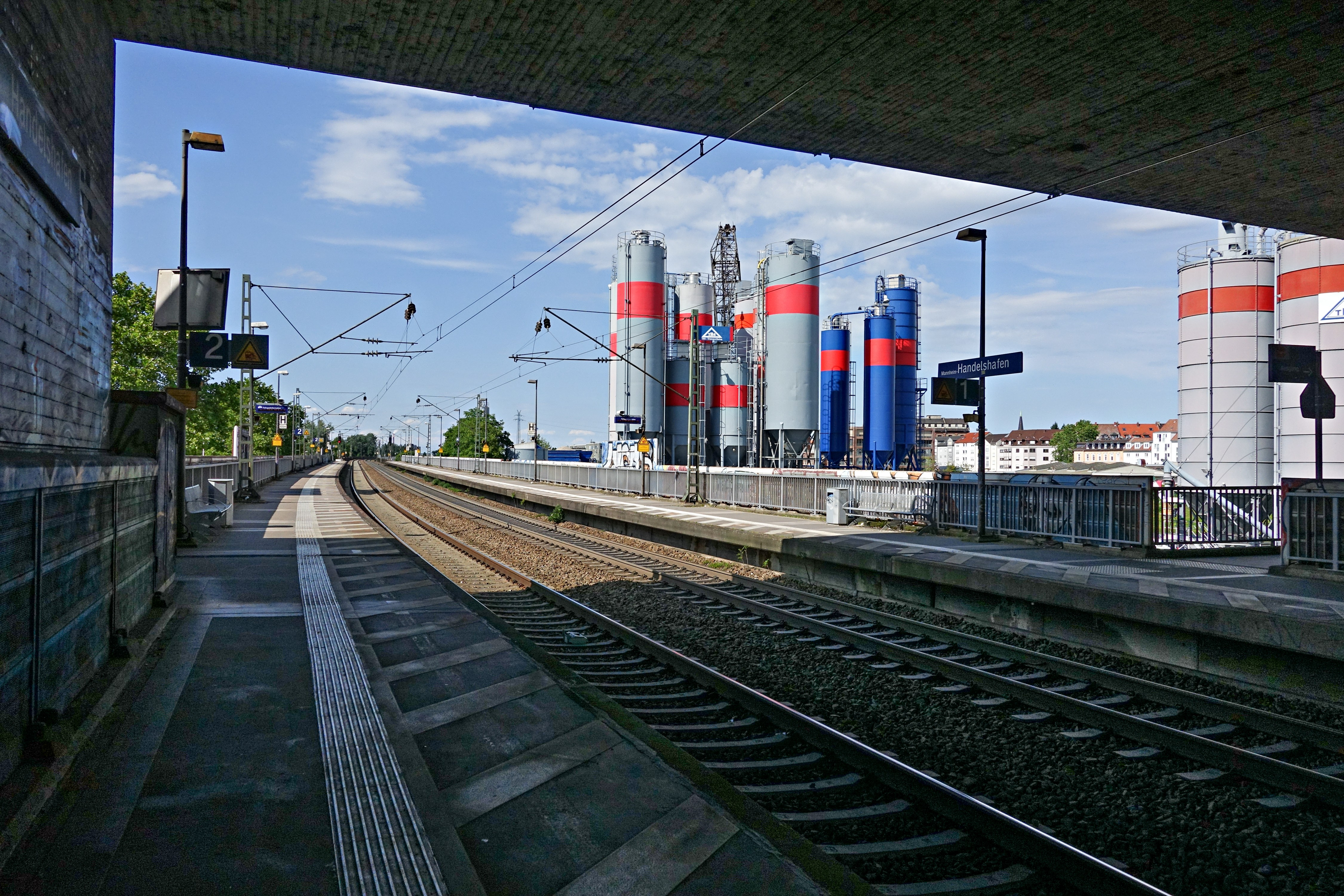
- 2019

General information
- Location: Verbindungskanal Linkes Ufer 10; 68159 Mannheim; Baden-Württemberg; Germany
- Coordinates: 49.4925°N 8.4539°E
- Owner: Deutsche Bahn
- Operator: DB Station&Service
- Lines: Western Entrance to the Riedbahn (KBS 655)
- Platforms: 2 side platforms
- Tracks: 2
- Train operators: DB Regio Mitte

Construction
- Parking: yes
- Cycle facilities: no
- Accessible: no

Other information
- Station code: 3929
- DS100 code: RMHH
- IBNR: 8006508
- Category: 6
- Fare zone: VRN: 94
- Website: www.bahnhof.de

History
- Opened: 2 June 1985; 41 years ago

Services
Preceding station	Rhine-Neckar S-Bahn	Following station
Mannheim Hbf towards Karlsruhe Hbf	S9	Mannheim-Neckarstadt towards Groß‑Rohrheim
Location

Mannheim-Handelshafen station is a railway station in the municipality of Mannheim, located in Baden-Württemberg, Germany.

== Notable places nearby ==
- Mannheim Harbour
