= Milwaukee District West Line =

Commuter rail line in Illinois

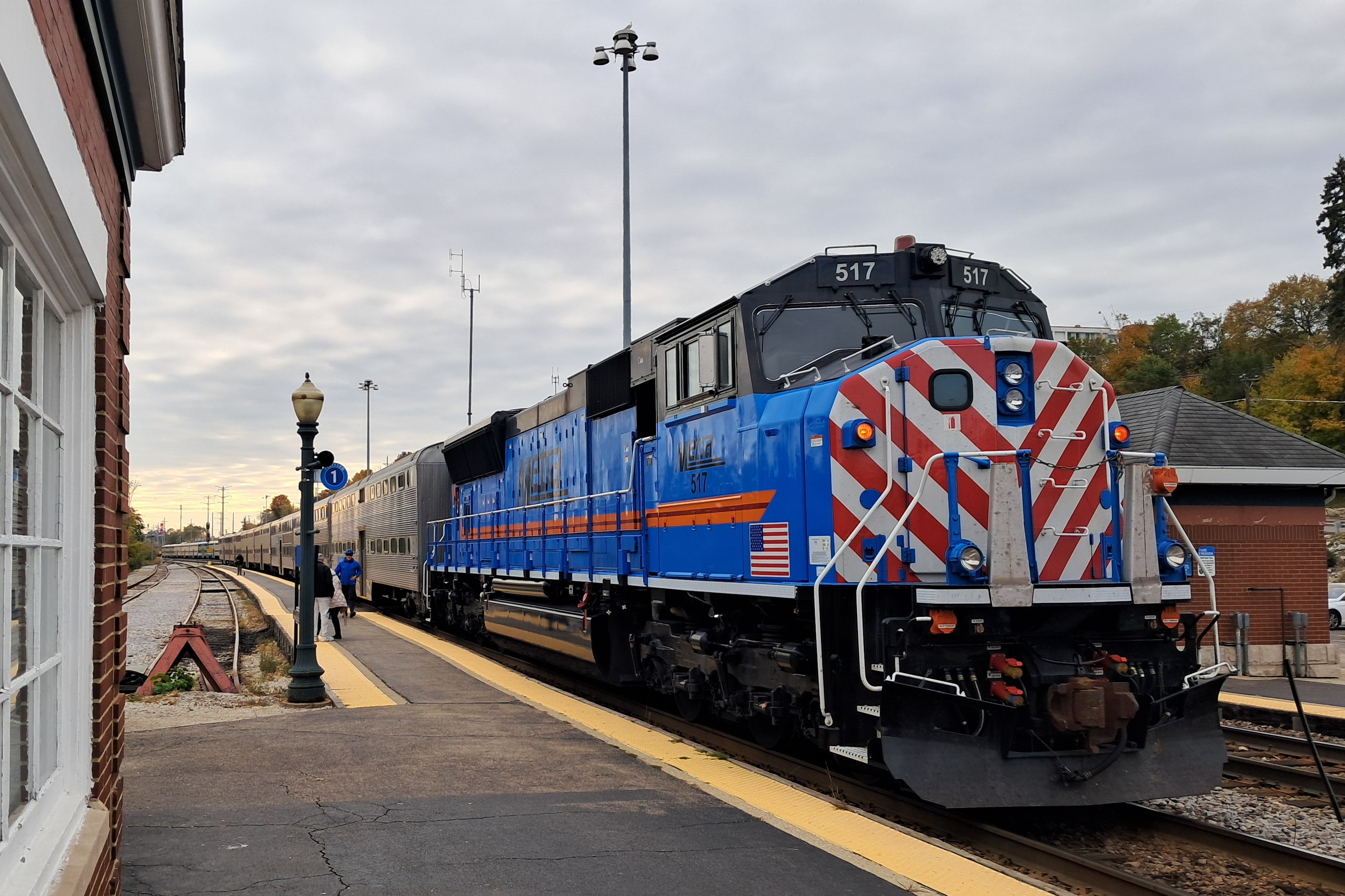
- A Milwaukee District West train departing Elgin bound for Chicago in 2025.

Overview
- Owner: Metra (Dispatched by Canadian Pacific Kansas City)
- Termini: Chicago Union Station; Big Timber Road (weekdays) Elgin (weekends/holidays)
- Stations: 22
- Website: metra.com/train-lines/md-w

Service
- Type: Commuter rail
- System: Metra
- Operator(s): Metra, CPKC Railway
- Daily ridership: 22,100 (average weekday; 2009)
- Ridership: 2,781,293 (2025)

Technical
- Line length: 39.8 mi (64.1 km)
- Track gauge: 4 ft 8 1/2 in (1,435 mm) standard gauge
Route map
Milwaukee District West Line highlighted in orange
Key
- Mileage source All stations are accessible except Mannheim.

The Milwaukee District West Line (MD-W) is a Metra commuter rail line in Chicago, Illinois, and its western suburbs. Metra does not refer to any of its lines by a particular color, but the timetable accents for the Milwaukee District West line are dark "Arrow Yellow," honoring the Milwaukee Road's Arrow passenger train. Trains are dispatched from the Canadian Pacific Kansas City Railway's American headquarters in Minneapolis.

The line runs from Chicago Union Station through the western suburbs to Elgin, Illinois. As of February 15, 2024, the public timetable shows 52 trains (26 in each direction) operating on weekdays. Of these, 19 inbound trains originate from Big Timber Road, three from Elgin, one from National Street, and three from Franklin Park. Three outbound trains terminate at Franklin Park, one at National Street, and the remainder terminate at Big Timber Road.

On weekends, Metra operates 12 roundtrips on Saturdays and nine on Sundays and holidays, all running between Union Station and Elgin. There is no weekend or holiday service to Big Timber Road.

The line runs on the CPKC Railway's Elgin Subdivision (ex-Milwaukee Road line to Omaha).

== History ==
In 1982, the Milwaukee Road Elgin Line was sold to the newly created Northeast Illinois Regional Commuter Rail Corporation which ran commuter trains for the Milwaukee Road while the latter underwent reorganization. The Milwaukee Road retained ownership of the line until 1986. Metra formally purchased the Milwaukee District (the only other being the Milwaukee District North Line) from the Soo Line Railroad (which took the bankrupt Milwaukee Road under its wing in 1985) in 1987. The Soo Line then ran freight trains on the line via trackage rights until it was absorbed into the Canadian Pacific Railway in 1990. CP Railway merged with the Kansas City Southern Railway in April 2023 into the Canadian Pacific Kansas City, or CPKC.

== Future ==
Metra has included the possibility of extending the Milwaukee District West Line along one of two routes in their Cost Benefit Analysis report. If this were to happen, the line could continue west via CPKC trackage to Hampshire, with an additional stop in Pingree Grove. Alternatively, the line could switch to the Union Pacific Railroad's Belvidere line (ex-Chicago & North Western line to Freeport) and travel northwest from Big Timber Road to Marengo, with additional stops in Gilberts, Huntley, and Union. In 2023, Governor J. B. Pritzker selected Metra to operate new intercity passenger rail beyond Big Timber Road to Rockford using the Milwaukee District West Line, with intermediate stops in Belvidere, Huntley, and at one of the three existing Metra stations in Elgin. The service would provide additional capacity to the existing line; introducing express reverse commute and expanded weekend options between Elgin and Union Station. The village of Huntley withdrew its support of the project in October 2025. The extension is scheduled to open in 2027, making it the first passenger rail service to connect Chicago and Rockford after the discontinuation of Amtrak's Black Hawk service in 1981.

== Ridership ==
Between 2014 and 2019, annual ridership declined 15% from 6,946,268 to 5,904,808. Due to the COVID-19 pandemic, ridership dropped to 1,480,973 passengers in 2020. The line's 2,781,293 riders in 2025 made it the eighth busiest Metra line.

== Rolling stock ==
The MD-W line's locomotive fleet consists of mainly MPI MP36PH-3C diesel-electric locomotives, with some EMD F40PH locomotives. The line also operates ex-GO Transit EMD F59PH locomotives. The fleet is pooled with the fleets for the North Central Service and the Milwaukee District North Line. As of 2016, three of these locomotives are in operation.

Coaches, or passenger railcars, consist mostly of Nippon Sharyo railcars built in the early 2000s. Cab cars are Nippon Sharyo built. Budd-built railcars also operate on the line, but the cab cars built by Budd have not been in use since the delivery of the newer railcars.

== Stations ==
County	Zone	Location	Station	Connections and notes
Kane	4	Elgin	Big Timber Road/Elgin	Pace: 550
Kane	4	Elgin	Elgin	Pace: 541, 542, 543, 546, 547, 548, 549, 550, 552, 554, 603, 801 (at Elgin Transportation Center)
Kane	4	Elgin	National Street/Elgin	Pace: 546, 801; Formerly named Hammond
Cook
Cook		Elgin/Bartlett	Spaulding	Closed 1971
Cook	4	Bartlett	Bartlett	
DuPage/ Cook	4	Hanover Park	Hanover Park	Pace: 554; Formerly called Ontarioville
DuPage/ Cook	4	Schaumburg	Schaumburg	
DuPage	4	Roselle	Roselle	
DuPage	3	Medinah	Medinah	
DuPage	3	Itasca	Itasca	
DuPage	3	Wood Dale	Wood Dale	
DuPage	3	Bensenville	Bensenville	Pace: 319, 332
Cook	2	Franklin Park	Mannheim	Pace: 319, 330
Cook	2	Franklin Park	Franklin Park	Pace: 303, 319
Cook	2	River Grove	River Grove	Metra: North Central Service; Pace: 319, 331
Cook	2	Elmwood Park	Elmwood Park	Pace: 319
Cook	2	Chicago	Mont Clare	CTA buses: 65 74
Cook	2	Chicago	Mars	
Cook	2	Chicago	Galewood	CTA buses: 86
Cook	2	Chicago	Hanson Park	CTA buses: 65 85
Cook	2	Chicago	Cragin	Closed in 2006, replaced by Grand/Cicero
Cook	2	Chicago	Grand/Cicero	CTA buses: 54 65 73
Cook	2	Chicago	Hermosa	Closed in 2006, replaced by Grand/Cicero
Cook	2	Chicago	Western Avenue	Metra: Milwaukee District North, North Central Service; CTA buses: 49 X49 65
Cook	2	Chicago	Ashland–Ogden	Proposed station; to open in 2032
Cook	1	Chicago	Union Station	Amtrak (long-distance): California Zephyr, Cardinal, City of New Orleans, Empire Builder, Floridian, Lake Shore Limited, Southwest Chief, Texas Eagle; Amtrak (intercity): Blue Water, Borealis, Hiawatha, Illini and Saluki, Illinois Zephyr and Carl Sandburg, Lincoln Service, Pere Marquette, Wolverine; Metra: BNSF, Heritage Corridor, Milwaukee District North, North Central Service, SouthWest Service; Chicago "L": Blue (at Clinton), Brown Orange Pink Purple (at Quincy); CTA buses: 1 7 J14 19 28 56 60 120 121 124 125 126 128 130 151 156 157 192; Pace: 755; Amtrak Thruway: Chicago–Madison and Chicago–Rockford (Van Galder), Chicago–Louisville (Greyhound)
