= Big Timber Road/Elgin station =

Commuter rail station in Elgin, Illinois

Big Timber Road/Elgin

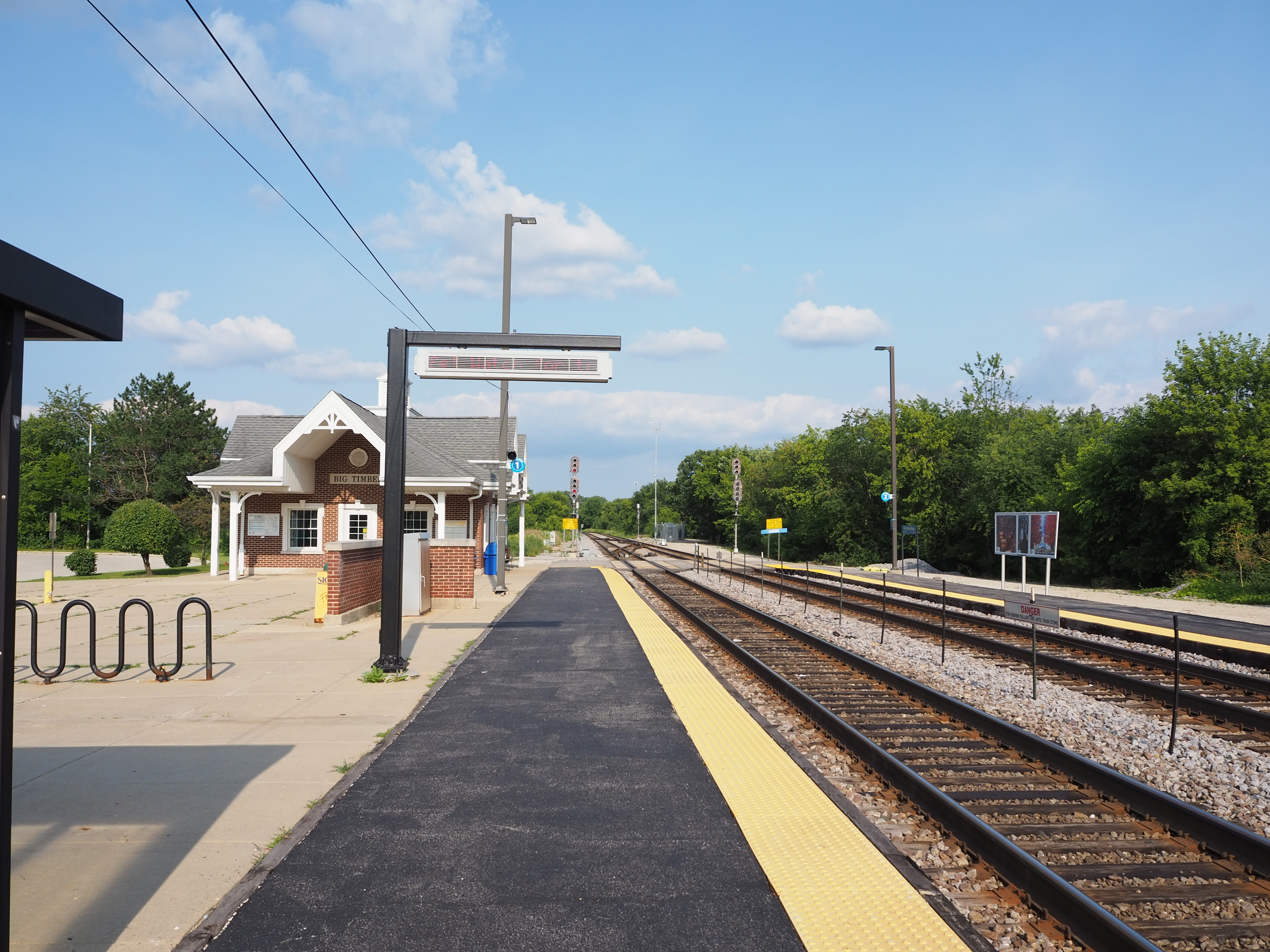
- Big Timber Road station in July 2024

General information
- Location: 2025 Big Timber Road; Elgin, IL
- Coordinates: 42.0587°N 88.3278°W
- Owner: Metra
- Line: Elgin Subdivision
- Platforms: 2 side platforms
- Tracks: 2

Construction
- Parking: Yes; Vendors
- Accessible: Yes

Other information
- Fare zone: 4

History
- Opened: 1986

Passengers
- 2018: 699 (average weekday) ▼11.4%
- Rank: 75 out of 236

Services
Preceding station	Metra	Following station
Terminus	Milwaukee District West	Elgin toward Union Station
Track layout
Location

Big Timber Road is a commuter railroad station in the Kane County portion of Elgin, Illinois, a western suburb of Chicago. The station is the western terminus of Metra's Milwaukee District West Line. It is 39.8 miles (64.1 km) away from Chicago Union Station, the eastern terminus of the line. In Metra's zone-based fare system, Big Timber Road is in zone 4. As of 2018, Big Timber Road is the 75th busiest of Metra's 236 non-downtown stations, with an average of 699 weekday boardings. When it opened in 1986 (the same year the Milwaukee Road ceased operations), the surrounding area mostly consisted of farmland. Since then, numerous residential subdivisions have been built.

Big Timber Road presently does not have service on weekends or holidays. As of February 15, 2024, there are a total of 41 trains serving the station, with 19 inbound trains originating from here and 22 outbound trains terminating here on weekdays. Travel time to Union Station ranges from 1 hour and 7 minutes to 1 hour and 28 minutes, depending on the train.

== Connections ==
- Pace Bus route 550
