= Elgin station (Illinois) =

Commuter rail station in Elgin, Illinois

Elgin

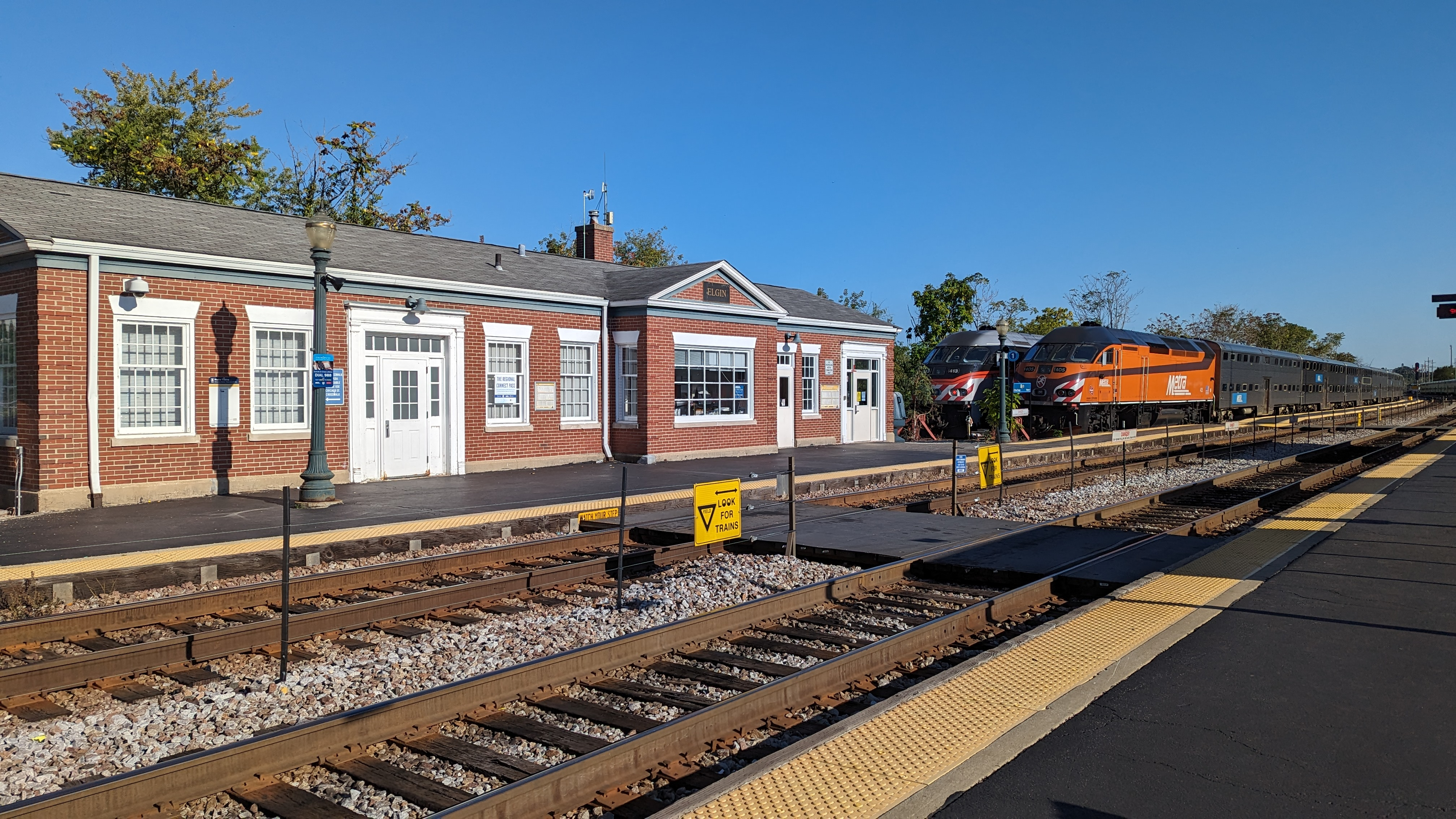
- Elgin station in October 2023

General information
- Location: 109 West Chicago Street; Elgin, Illinois 60120
- Coordinates: 42.0362°N 88.2861°W
- Owner: City of Elgin
- Line: Elgin Subdivision
- Platforms: 2 side platforms (1 becomes an island platform)
- Tracks: 4 (2 end at the station)
- Connections: Pace Buses at Elgin Transportation Center

Construction
- Parking: Yes
- Accessible: Yes

Other information
- Fare zone: 4

History
- Opened: 1947

Passengers
- 2018: 411 (average weekday) ▼5.7%
- Rank: 116 out of 236

Services
Preceding station	Metra	Following station
Big Timber/Elgin Terminus	Milwaukee District West	National Street toward Union Station
Former services
Preceding station	Milwaukee Road	Following station
Almora toward Omaha	Omaha – Chicago	Western Avenue toward Chicago
Terminus	Suburban Service West Line	National Street toward Chicago
Services at Elgin (West Side) station
Preceding station	Chicago and North Western Railway	Following station
Gilberts toward Freeport	Freeport Branch	South Elgin toward West Chicago
Future services
Preceding station	Metra	Following station
Belvidere toward Rockford	Rockford Intercity Passenger Rail	Union Station Terminus
Track layout
Location

Elgin is one of three stations on Metra's Milwaukee District West Line in Elgin, Illinois. The station is 36.6 miles (58.9 km) away from Chicago Union Station, the eastern terminus of the line. In Metra's zone-based fare system, Elgin is in zone 4. As of 2018, Elgin is the 116th busiest of Metra's 236 non-downtown stations, with an average of 411 weekday boardings.

As of February 15, 2024, Elgin is served by 44 trains (22 in each direction) on weekdays, by all 24 trains (12 in each direction) on Saturdays, and by all 18 trains (nine in each direction) on Sundays and holidays. All weekend trains originate and terminate here, in addition to three inbound trains originating from here on weekdays.

The station was built by The Milwaukee Road and was a stop on numerous intercity trains, such as the Midwest Hiawatha, Arrow, and Southwest Limited. It was also the terminus station for by more frequent commuter trains to Chicago Union Station, until Metra took over service.

The Elgin Metra station is also proposed as a stop on the Black Hawk, a proposed revival of a former Amtrak train of the same name. However, service to Rockford, Illinois is planned to begin operations in late 2027 with Metra instead of Amtrak.

== Notable places nearby ==
- Fox River Trolley Museum
- Pace Elgin Transportation Center

== Bus connections ==
Pace

- "Route 541 – Northeast Elgin". PaceBus.com. Chicago: Pace Suburban Bus Service.
- "Route 542 – Bluff City". PaceBus.com. Chicago: Pace Suburban Bus Service.
- "Route 543 – Dundee/Carpentersville". PaceBus.com. Chicago: Pace Suburban Bus Service.
- "Route 546 – Orange/Walnut". PaceBus.com. Chicago: Pace Suburban Bus Service.
- "Route 547 – Wing Park". PaceBus.com. Chicago: Pace Suburban Bus Service.
- "Route 548 – Highland". PaceBus.com. Chicago: Pace Suburban Bus Service.
- "Route 549 – South Randall". PaceBus.com. Chicago: Pace Suburban Bus Service.
- "Route 550 – Elgin Transportation Center/Crystal Lake". PaceBus.com. Chicago: Pace Suburban Bus Service.
- "Route 552 – North State/Spring Hill Mall". PaceBus.com. Chicago: Pace Suburban Bus Service.
- "Route 554 – Elgin/Woodfield". PaceBus.com. Chicago: Pace Suburban Bus Service.
- "Route 603 – Elgin Transportation Center/Rosemont Express". PaceBus.com. Chicago: Pace Suburban Bus Service.
- "Route 801 – Elgin/Geneva". PaceBus.com. Chicago: Pace Suburban Bus Service.
