= Rockford Intercity Passenger Rail =

Proposed Metra inter-city rail service

Overview
- Service type: Inter-city rail
- Status: Planning
- Predecessor: Black Hawk
- First service: 2027
- Current operator: Metra
- Website: https://chicagotorockfordrail.org/

Route
- Termini: Chicago Union Station; Rockford
- Stops: 4 (2 existing, 2 proposed)
- Distance travelled: 86.8 miles (139.7 km)
- Average journey time: 95 minutes
- Service frequency: Two daily roundtrips
- Lines used: Elgin Subdivision, Belvidere Subdivision

Technical
- Track gauge: 4 ft 8 1/2 in (1,435 mm) standard gauge
- Operating speed: 79 mph (127 km/h) (top)
- Track owners: Metra, CPKC, Union Pacific Railroad

The Rockford Intercity Passenger Rail is a future Metra inter-city rail service between Chicago and Rockford, Illinois. The project is being led by the Illinois Department of Transportation (IDOT) funded with $275 million through the Rebuild Illinois capital plan. The route is expected to begin by 2027, reinstating rail service to Rockford for the first time in over 40 years after the discontinuation of Amtrak's Black Hawk in 1981.

The service will operate without stops along the Milwaukee District West Line between Chicago Union Station and Elgin, with a stop at one of the three existing Metra stations. The route will continue west beyond Big Timber Road station on a new connection to the Union Pacific Railroad's Belvidere Subdivision. The service will have an intermediate stop in Belvidere before terminating in downtown Rockford.

The route has yet to receive an official name, with Metra interested in branding the service to distinguish it from its existing commuter rail network.

In a late 2025 update, the project administrators confirmed the necessary construction/track upgrades were slated to begin in spring 2026, with passenger service still set for 2027.

As of August 2026, the service is likely to open in early 2027, although Metra's president is uncertain whether it would actually meet that deadline. The Rockford service will most likely use three trainsets of existing Metra locomotives and coaches, although leased IDOT-owned Siemens Charger and Siemens Venture sets already used by Amtrak Midwest might also be used for this service.

== Stations and fares ==
The route will service five stations at two existing and three new facilities. Existing stations will be located at Chicago Union Station, the line's east terminal, and at an existing station in downtown Elgin. Station locations and designs in Huntley, Belvidere, and Rockford need to be determined, with preliminary plans expected by November 1, 2023. The station at Chicago Street in downtown Elgin offers a connection to Pace's Elgin Transportation Center. The village of Huntley withdrew its support of the project in October 2025. The city of Marengo has proposed that the station be opened there instead.

Fares are yet to be determined, and are expected to be structured differently than existing commuter rail fares. IDOT and Metra are working together to determine appropriate pricing. One reason Metra was selected as an operator over Amtrak was existing fare integration with other Chicago area transit authorities.

County	Location	Station	Connections	Notes
Winnebago	Rockford	Rockford	Future station; to open by 2027	Station to be located downtown, west of Main Street on or near the site of the previous CNW station
Boone	Belvidere	Belvidere	Future station; to open by 2027	Station to be located downtown, east of State Street near the Boone County Museum of History
McHenry	Marengo	Marengo	Potential future station, proposed by the city of Marengo.	
Kane	Elgin	Elgin	Metra: Milwaukee District West; Pace Bus	National Street and Big Timber Road were originally considered as other options for this service's Elgin stop, although Elgin has ultimately been chosen for this service.
Cook	Chicago	Union Station	Amtrak (long-distance): California Zephyr, Cardinal, City of New Orleans, Empire Builder, Floridian, Lake Shore Limited, Southwest Chief, Texas Eagle; Amtrak (intercity): Blue Water, Borealis, Hiawatha, Illini and Saluki, Illinois Zephyr and Carl Sandburg, Lincoln Service, Pere Marquette, Wolverine; Metra: BNSF, Heritage Corridor, Milwaukee District North, Milwaukee District West, North Central Service, SouthWest Service; Chicago "L": Blue (at Clinton), Brown Orange Pink Purple (at Quincy); CTA buses: 1 7 J14 19 28 56 60 120 121 124 125 126 128 130 151 156 157 192; Pace Bus: 755; Amtrak Thruway: to Madison and Rockford (Van Galder), and to Louisville (Greyhound)	

== See also ==
- Quad Cities, an under construction Amtrak service funded through Rebuild Illinois
- Amtrak Black Hawk, the last intercity train to serve Rockford (1974–1981)
