= Harlem station (CTA Blue Line O'Hare branch) =

Chicago "L" station

Harlem 7200W 5600N
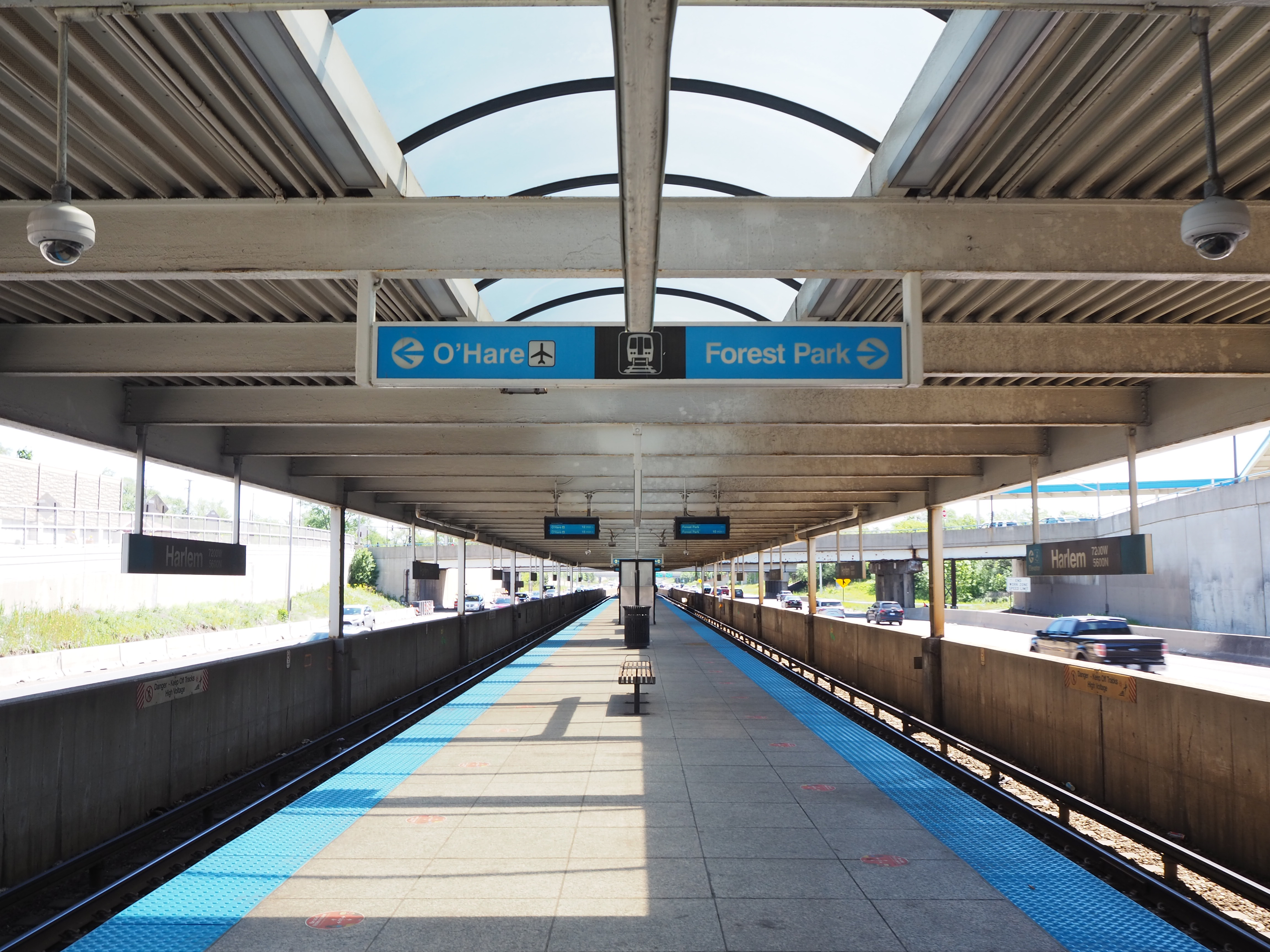

General information
- Location: 5550 North Harlem Avenue; Chicago, Illinois 60656
- Coordinates: 41.982456°N 87.80705°W
- Owner: Chicago Transit Authority
- Line: O'Hare Branch
- Platforms: 1 Island platform
- Tracks: 2
- Connections: CTA and Pace Buses

Construction
- Structure type: Expressway median
- Parking: 53 Spaces
- Cycle facilities: Yes
- Accessible: Yes

History
- Opened: February 27, 1983; 43 years ago
- Rebuilt: 2016 (platform renovation, station house repainting), 2024–26 (bus bridge)

Passengers
- 2025: 489,923 ▲5%

Services
Preceding station	Chicago "L"	Following station
Cumberland toward O'Hare	Blue Line	Jefferson Park toward Forest Park
Track layout
Location

Harlem is a Chicago "L" station serving the Blue Line's O'Hare branch in Chicago's Norwood Park neighborhood. It is not to be confused with the other Harlem Blue Line station. Trains run from Harlem every 2–7 minutes during rush hour, and take approx. 30 minutes to travel to the Loop. O'Hare-bound trains take 10 minutes to reach the airport from Harlem. The station is located in the median of the Kennedy Expressway.

Harlem station opened on February 27, 1983 as part of the 7.9-mile extension of the West-Northwest Route from Jefferson Park to River Road. Similar to the 1970-built stations on the previous Kennedy Extension (Addison to Jefferson Park), Harlem station sits in the median of the Kennedy Expressway (Interstate 90). Where the previous Kennedy stations were all designed by Skidmore, Owings and Merrill (SOM) to be aesthetically similar in appearance, stations on the O'Hare Extension beyond Jefferson Park were designed by four different firms in a variety of architectural styles. The Harlem station, the only one designed by SOM, shares a similar boxy, open design of the previous 1970 Kennedy Extension (and the 1969-built Dan Ryan stations), except the newer Harlem station has an enclosed platform canopy where the support frame was designed on the highway median walls, thus providing an unobstructed platform, free of column supports. An almost identical canopy frame was also employed at the Cumberland station, however, it was designed another architectural super-giant, Perkins + Will.

== Bus connections ==
CTA

- 88 Higgins
- 90 Harlem

Pace

- 209 Busse Highway (weekdays only)
- 423 Linden CTA/The Glen/Harlem CTA (weekdays only)

== Gallery ==
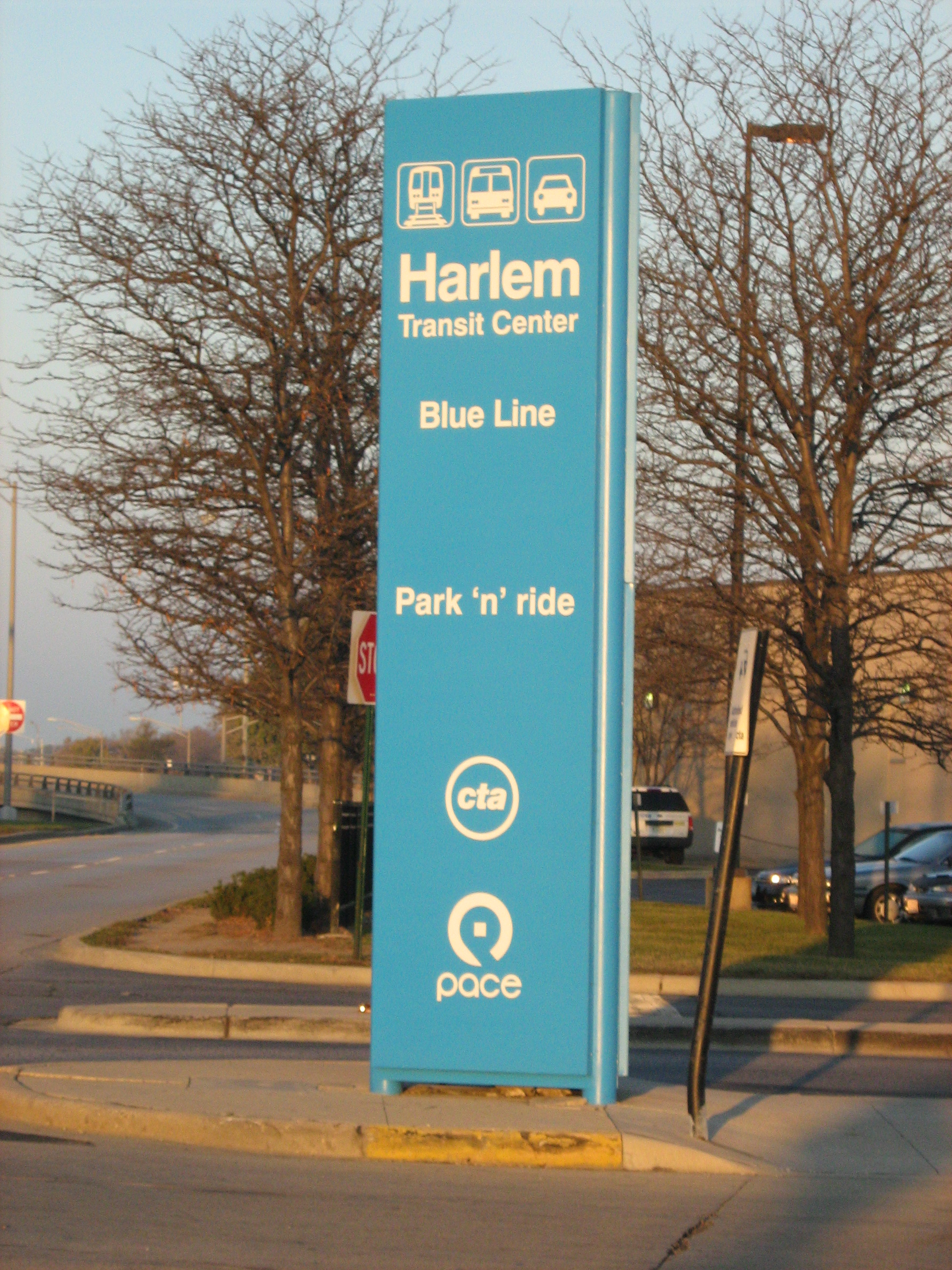
Harlem Transit Center Sign, November 2007

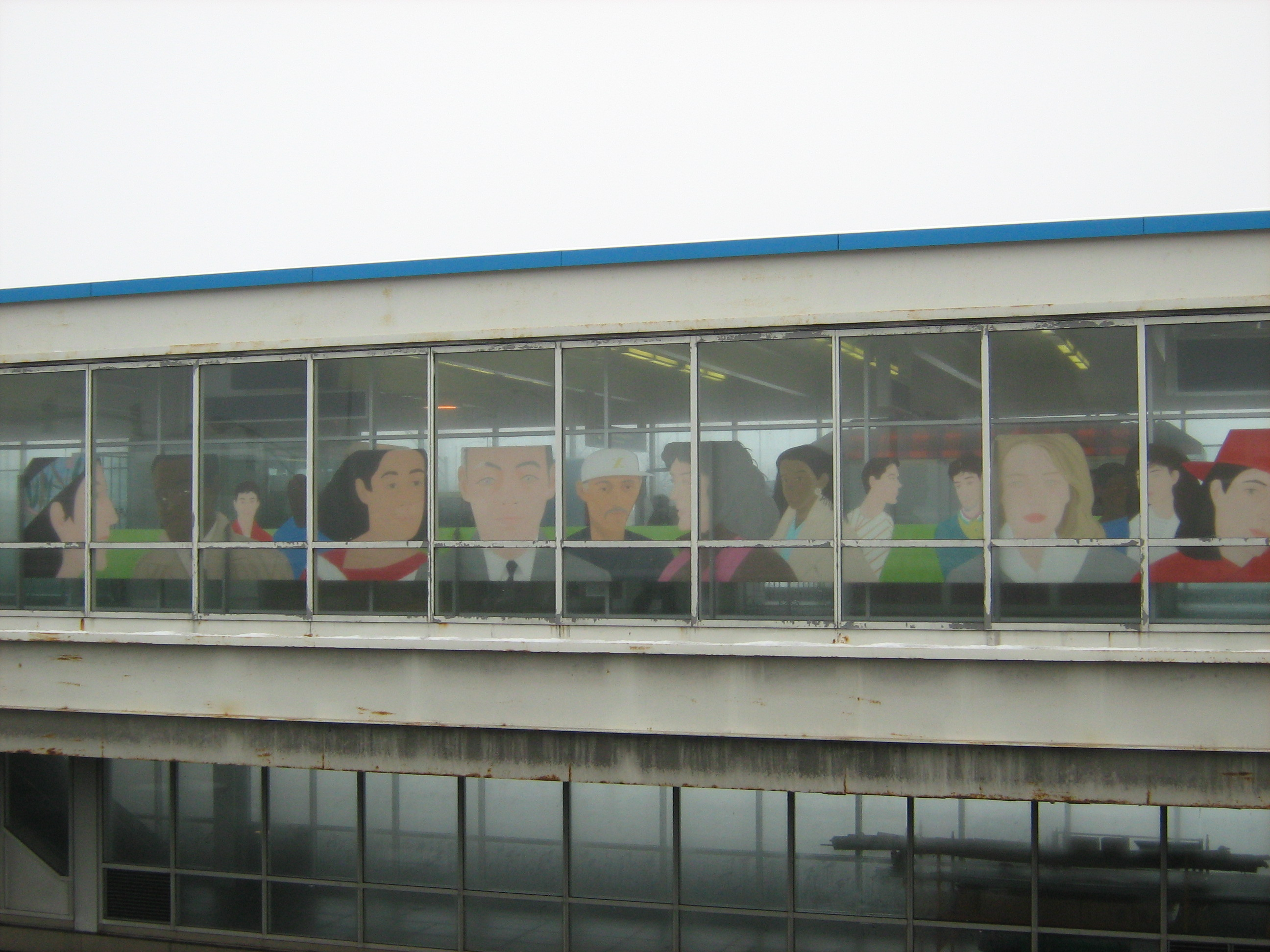
Harlem Station Mural, February 2008

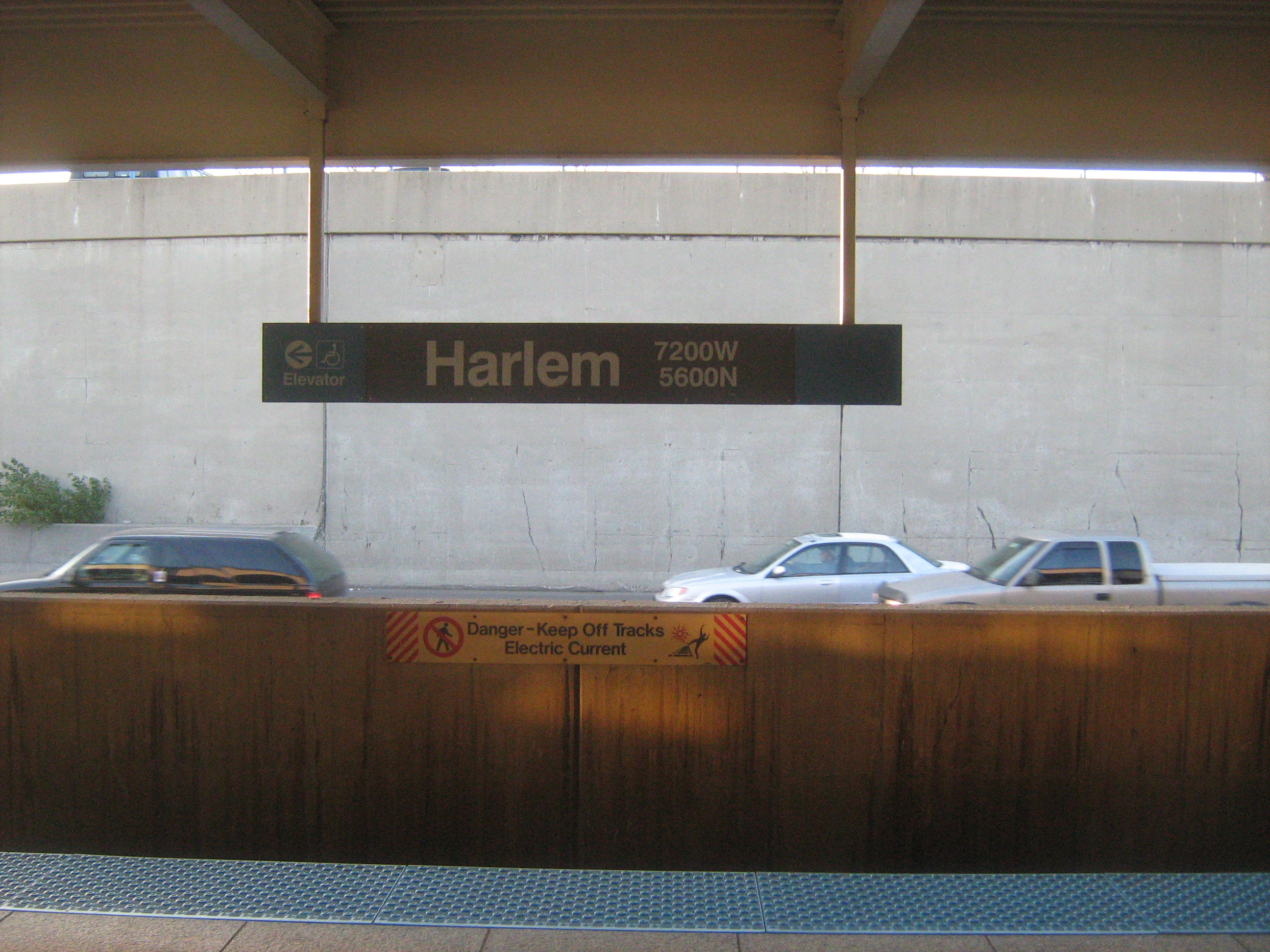
View of the Kennedy Expressway from the platform, November 2007

== See also ==
- Harlem (CTA Blue Line Congress branch)
- Harlem/Lake (CTA Green Line)
