= Southwest Limited =

Southwest Limited or Southwestern Limited refers to several American passenger trains:

- Southwest Limited (Amtrak train) (1974–1984), a Chicago–Los Angeles train now known as the Southwest Chief
- Southwest Limited (Milwaukee Road train) (1903–1958), a Milwaukee Road train between Chicago and Kansas City
- Southwestern Limited (IC train) (1934–1967), an Illinois Central train between Meridian, Mississippi, and Shreveport, Louisiana
- Southwestern Limited (New York Central train) (1889–1966), a train between New York City and St. Louis
