= Cumberland station (CTA) =

Chicago "L" station

Cumberland 8400W 5700N
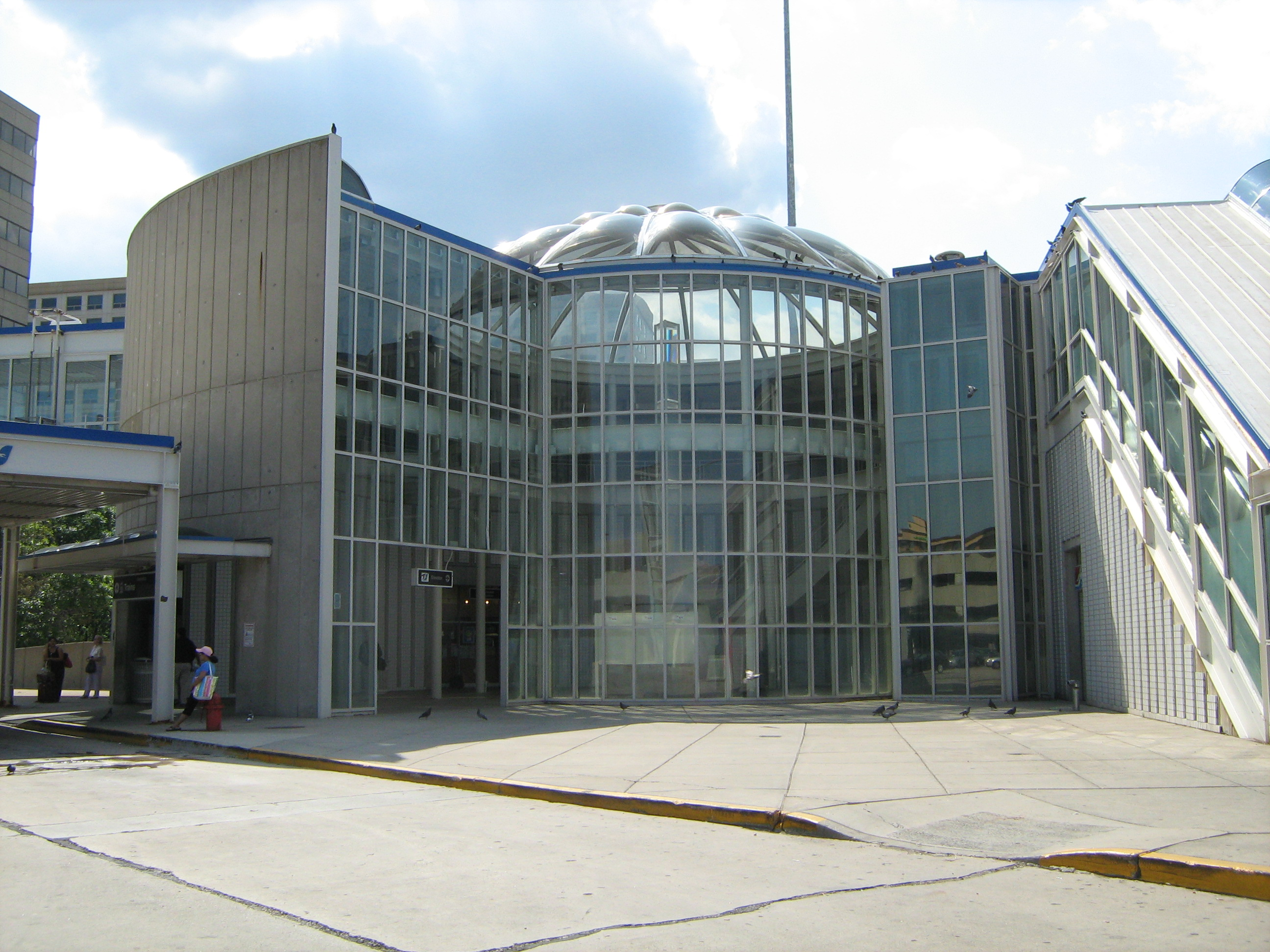
- The exterior of the station building at Cumberland

General information
- Location: 5800 North Cumberland Avenue; Chicago, Illinois 60631
- Coordinates: 41.984246°N 87.838028°W
- Owner: Chicago Transit Authority
- Line: O'Hare Branch
- Platforms: 1 Island platform
- Tracks: 2
- Connections: CTA; Pace; Greyhound Buses; Burlington Trailways Buses

Construction
- Structure type: Expressway median
- Parking: 1633 spaces
- Cycle facilities: Yes
- Accessible: Yes

History
- Opened: February 27, 1983; 43 years ago
- Rebuilt: 2016

Passengers
- 2025: 717,981 ▲8.4%

Services
Preceding station	Chicago "L"	Following station
Rosemont toward O'Hare	Blue Line	Harlem toward Forest Park
Track layout
Location

Cumberland is a station on the Chicago Transit Authority's 'L' system. Situated on the Blue Line between Rosemont and Harlem, the station is located in the median of the Kennedy Expressway at Cumberland Avenue in the O'Hare community area’s Schorsch Forest View neighborhood on Chicago's Northwest Side. It is also in close proximity to both the Norwood Park neighborhood and the city of Park Ridge as well as the village of Norridge. The area surrounding the station consists of mixed commercial and residential development.

The Cumberland station was first proposed in 1972 as part of an extension of the Blue Line from Logan Square to O'Hare International Airport. The station opened on February 27, 1983, along with Harlem and River Road. The three new stations brought 6,000 new riders to the northwest CTA line in the following month, and Cumberland became especially attractive to suburban commuters. The station at Cumberland consists of a single island platform; a pedestrian overpass connects the platform to a station building to the south and an exit stairway to the north. The station also includes a bus terminal and a park and ride lot. Trains serve Cumberland 24 hours a day every day; the headway between trains is 2–7 minutes during peak periods, with less frequent service at other times. In addition to trains, Cumberland also serves CTA buses, Pace buses, Burlington Trailways buses, and Greyhound buses.

== Location ==
Cumberland is located at the junction of Cumberland Avenue and the Kennedy Expressway (I-90, exit 79). The station is located on a border between O'Hare and Norwood Park. It is the closest 'L' station to the city of Park Ridge, which borders Chicago along Higgins Road north of the station. The area surrounding the station consists of a mixture of planned development, commercial, and residential areas. Citicorp Plaza, an office building which houses the headquarters of telecommunications provider U.S. Cellular, is located to the south of Cumberland at 8410 W. Bryn Mawr. North of Cumberland at 8725 W. Higgins Rd. is the headquarters of mapmaker Rand McNally. The Renaissance Chicago O'Hare Suites Hotel is also located near the station at 8500 W. Bryn Mawr.

== History ==
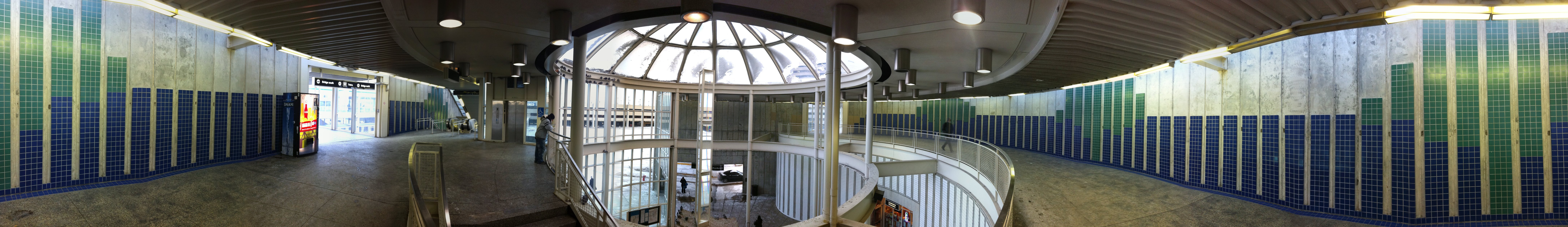
Panorama of the station interior.

The extension of the CTA line in the median of the Kennedy Expressway from Jefferson Park to O'Hare Airport, which included the construction of the Cumberland station, was first proposed by Mayor Richard J. Daley in 1972 by the Chicago Public Works Commission. The cost of this project was initially estimated at $80 million. The Chicago Plan Commission approved the project on August 8, 1974; by this point, the estimated cost of the project had risen to $174 million. The federal government approved the project and agreed to provide 80 percent of the funds for its construction in 1978, and construction on the 7.9-mile (12.7 km) extension began in March 1980. The extension was originally planned to open in 1982; however, its opening was delayed after a series of incidents including two strikes by workers on the line. The section of the extension from Jefferson Park to River Road, including Cumberland, opened on February 27, 1983; the CTA ran free shuttle trains between the new stations at River Road, and Harlem, the day before their opening so riders could "get acquainted" with the new line. The final cost of the extension was $198.9 million, with the Cumberland station costing approximately $10 million.

In the month following the opening of the three new stations, 6,000 additional commuters used the northwest service. The Cumberland station became particularly attractive to suburban commuters from Des Plaines and Park Ridge; a study commissioned shortly after the station's opening found that only 12.4% of commuters parking in the Cumberland and Rosemont stations were Chicagoans. The influx of suburban commuters to the new Blue Line stops led to a fall in ridership on the Chicago & North Western's Northwest Line, which traditionally served the northwest suburbs near the new stops.

== Facilities ==
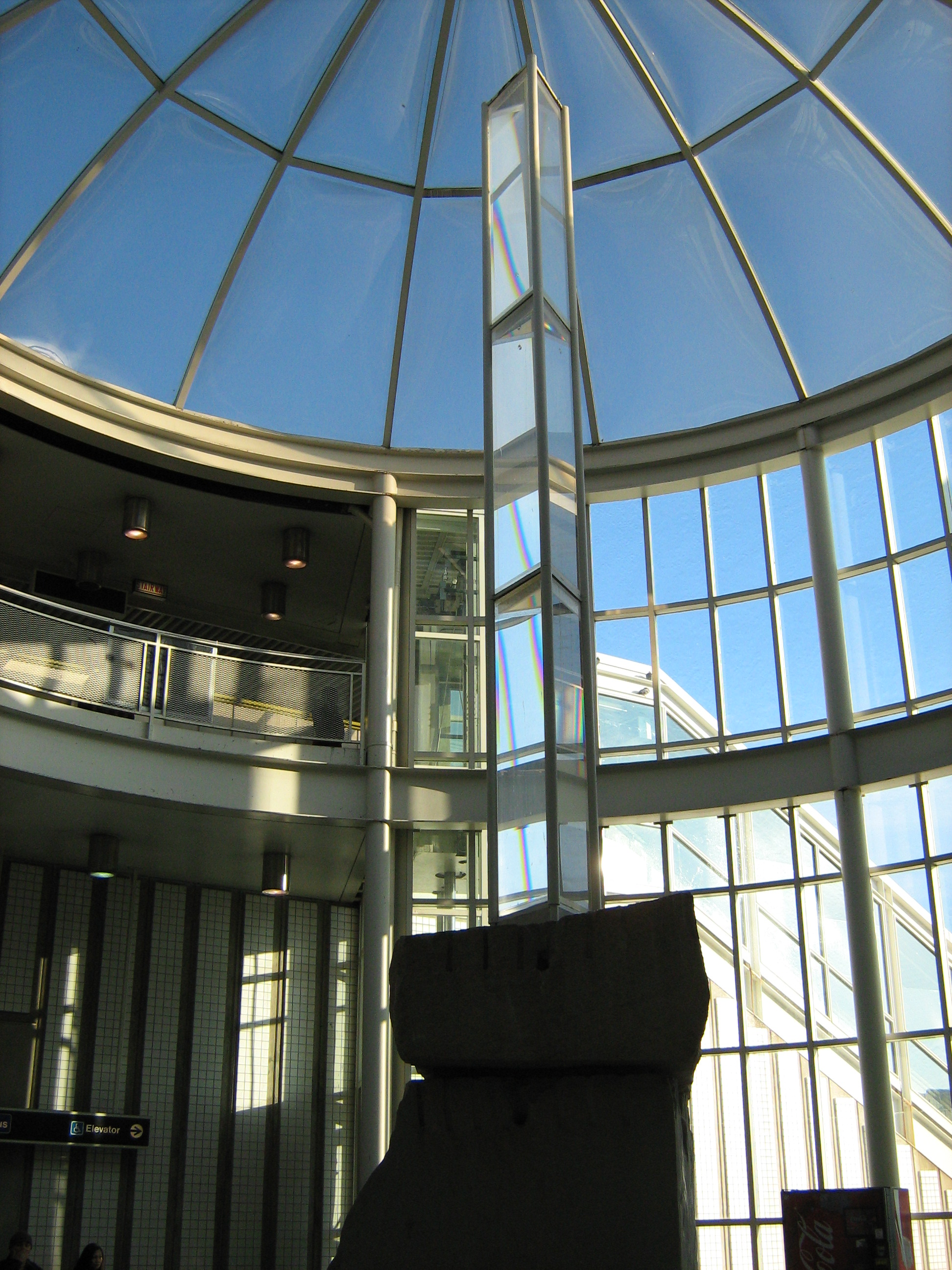
Rock Bow in the Cumberland station building

The Cumberland station was designed by Wojciech M. Madeyski of the architectural firm Perkins and Will. Cumberland's island platform is located in the median of the Kennedy Expressway to the west of Cumberland Avenue. It serves the Blue Line's two tracks; the northern track serves trains to O'Hare, while the southern track serves trains to Forest Park. Electronic signs on the platform offer real-time information about train arrivals and service alerts; Cumberland is one of four 'L' stations with these signs, which were installed in 2002 as part of a pilot program. A pedestrian overpass connects the platform to entrances on the north and south sides of the expressway. The north side of the overpass leads to an exit stairway, while the south side leads to the main station building. The station building houses a public art sculpture, Rock Bow by Charles Ross; the sculpture consists of a 40 feet (12 m) high metal-cased prism set in a limestone base. Cumberland's bus terminal and park and ride lot are also located south of the platform. The park and ride lot has 1633 spaces and is operated by CPS Parking; the lot originally had 706 spaces and expanded to its current capacity in 1992. The facilities at Cumberland are handicapped accessible.

== Train Service ==
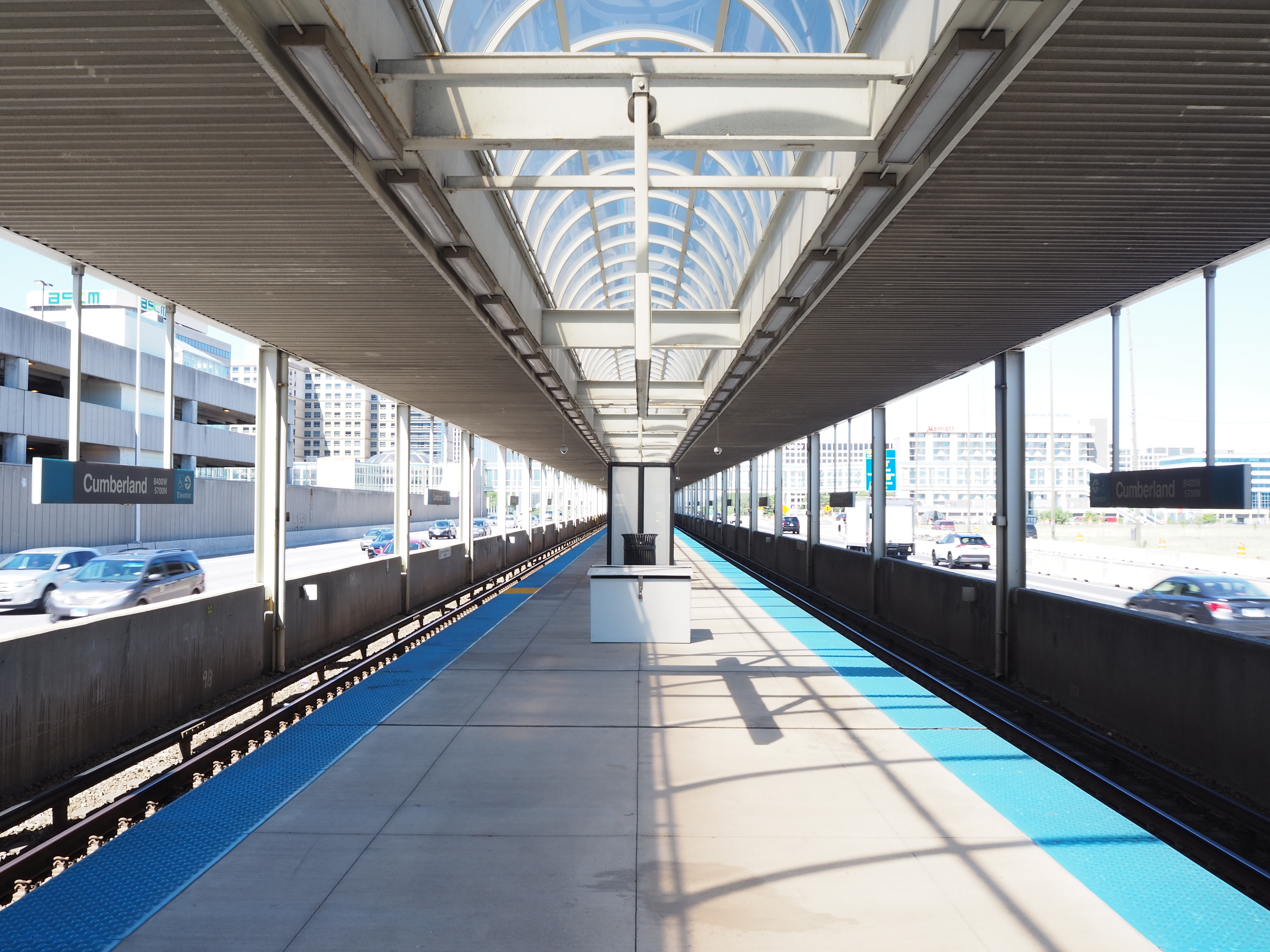
Platform at Cumberland, 2021

Cumberland is part of the CTA's Blue Line, which runs from O'Hare Airport to downtown Chicago and Forest Park. It is the third inbound station from O'Hare on the Blue Line and is situated between the Rosemont and Harlem stations. Blue Line trains serve Cumberland 24 hours a day every day; trains operate roughly every 7 to 10 minutes during rush hour and midday operation, with longer headways of up to 30 minutes at night. The station is approximately seven minutes from O'Hare, 31 minutes from Clark/Lake in the Loop, and 52 minutes from Forest Park. 1,304,280 passengers boarded at Cumberland in 2011.

== Bus connections ==
CTA

- 81W West Lawrence

Pace

- 240 Dee Road (weekday rush hours only)
- 241 Greenwood/Talcott (weekday rush hours only)
- 290 Touhy Avenue
- 331 Cumberland/5th Avenue

Greyhound

Cumberland services several bus routes in addition to 'L' trains. One CTA bus route terminates at the station, the 81W West Lawrence; this route provides service to Cumberland Avenue, Lawrence Avenue, East River Road, and the Jefferson Park Transit Center. Four Pace bus routes also terminate at Cumberland: the 240 Dee Road, the 241 Greenwood/Talcott, the 290 Touhy Avenue, and the 331 Cumberland/5th Avenue. These routes connect to the Golf Mill Shopping Center, the Howard 'L' station, and the communities of Park Ridge, Niles and Brookfield. Intercity bus routes operated by Greyhound and by Burlington Trailways also make stops at this station.
