= Elgin Transportation Center =

Bus station in Illinois

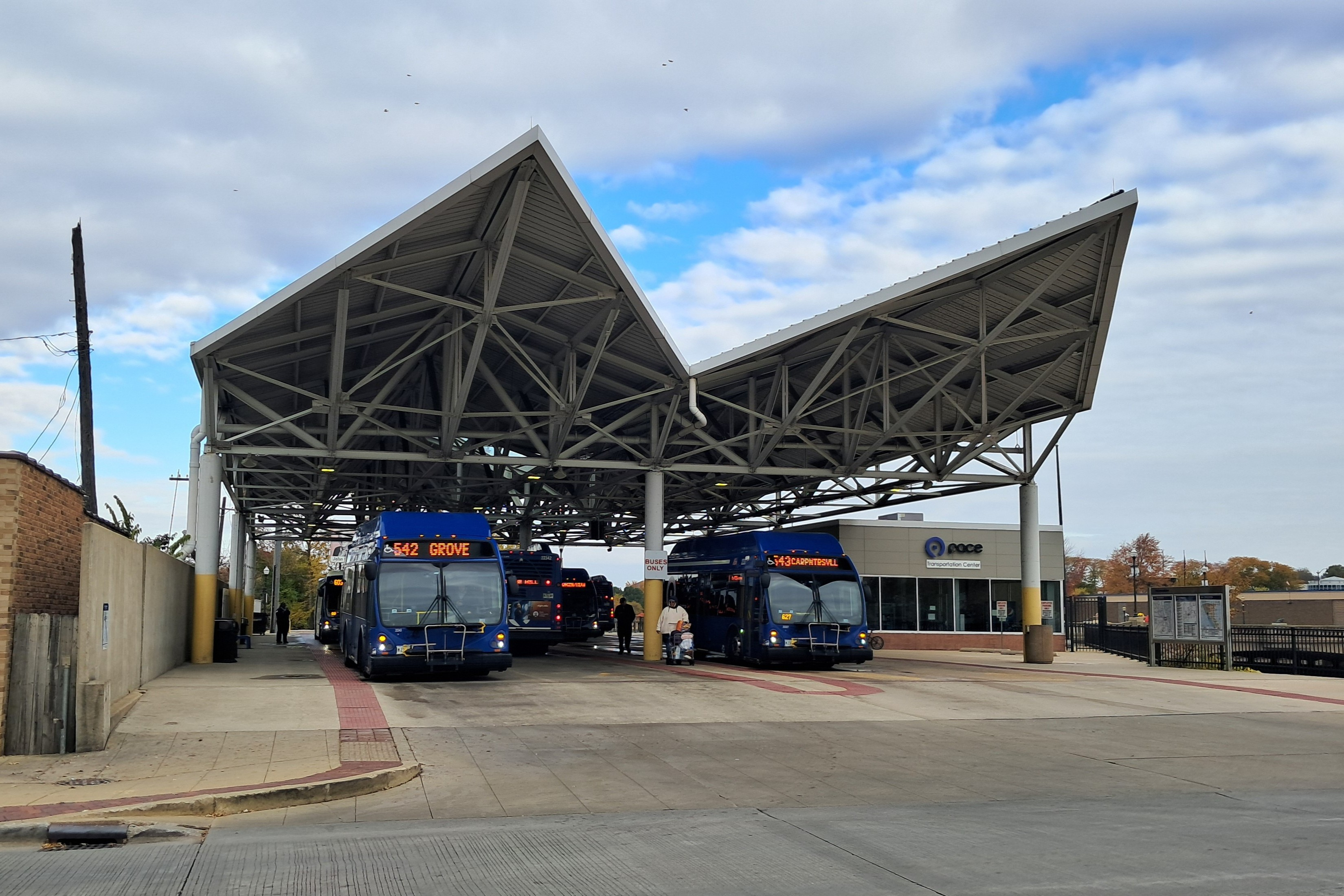

General information
- Location: 102 West Chicago Street; Elgin, Illinois 60123
- Coordinates: 42.037159°N 88.286748°W
- Bus operators: Pace
- Connections: at Elgin

Construction
- Structure type: at-grade
- Parking: None
- Cycle facilities: Yes
- Accessible: Yes

History
- Rebuilt: 2016

Passengers
- 2009: 2,994/weekday

Services
Preceding station	Metra	Following station
Big Timber Road toward Big Timber/Elgin	Milwaukee District West transfer at Elgin	National Street toward Union Station
Location

The Elgin Transportation Center is the main local bus station in Elgin, Illinois, serving as the central hub for the Pace bus system in the Elgin area. The station is located adjacent to the Elgin Metra station on the west bank of the Fox River.

== Bus routes ==
Pace

- 541 Northeast Elgin
- 542 Bluff City
- 543 Dundee/Carpentersville
- 546 Orange/Walnut
- 547 Wing Park
- 548 Highland
- 549 South Randall
- 550 Elgin Transportation Center/Crystal Lake
- 552 North State/Spring Hill Mall
- 554 Elgin/Woodfield
- 603 Elgin Transportation Center/Rosemont Express (I-90 Express)
- 801 Elgin/Geneva

== Train connection ==
Metra

- Elgin
