= Suburban Transit Access Route =

Proposed Chicago commuter rail line

Overview
- Status: Canceled
- Locale: Cook County, DuPage County, Will County
- Termini: O'Hare, Chicago; Joliet, Illinois
- Stations: 17

Service
- Type: Suburb-to-suburb commuter rail
- System: Metra

Technical
- Line length: 55 mi
- Track gauge: 4 ft 8 1/2 in (1,435 mm)

The Suburban Transit Access Route (or STAR Line) was a proposed railway project in northwest and outer suburban Chicago, Illinois, United States. On January 30, 2003, Metra announced plans to build a new service line that would introduce a new fleet of Diesel multiple unit trains (DMUs) to connect nearly 100 communities in the region and form Metra's only suburb-to-suburb service. Currently all of Metra's services are oriented on suburb-to-city travel.

The route of the STAR line was planned to travel along the EJ&E right of way and in the median of the Northwest Tollway (Interstate 90). The tollway median was a proposed extension of the CTA Blue Line westward to Schaumburg, but construction plans of the Suburban Transit Access Route caused the extension to be canceled. Very high ridership was expected due to its unique travel theme: around 80,000 passengers a day. The line was to be 55 miles in length.

The cost estimate for the STAR Line was $1.1 billion. The project was authorized under what was, in 2005, the most recent federal transportation funding bill: SAFETEA-LU. The project underwent Alternatives Analysis before cancellation.

== Project ==
The 55-mile (89 km) Metra route would have been the first suburb-to-suburb train line in the Chicago area since 1943. Chicagoland has had at least three suburb to suburb lines in its early history. There was the New York Central line between Gary, Indiana and Joliet (Until 1925), the Chicago & North Western line between Kenosha, Wisconsin and Harvard (Until 1939), and the Burlington Route line between Aurora and West Chicago (Until 1943). The line would have started at O'Hare International Airport, run west along Interstate 90 towards Hoffman Estates, then south along the Elgin, Joliet and Eastern Railway towards Joliet. The line would have connected almost 100 communities in Will, DuPage, and Cook County. The route would have used a new fleet of European-style trains running at 79 miles per hour (127 km/h), providing service at 15-minute intervals during peak periods.

In June 2003, the Regional Transportation Authority board unanimously signaled their support for the proposed STAR Line. The project would have cost $1.1 billion and would have taken 10 years to build, depending on funding.

In January 2012, the Daily Herald reported that Metra was no longer actively studying the project, partly due to a lack of funding from federal and state governments. Other transport modes, such as bus rapid transit, offered a cheaper alternative to the STAR Line.

== See also ==
- Pace I-90 Express
