= Pace I-90 Express =

Bus service in Chicago area

600, 603, 605, 607
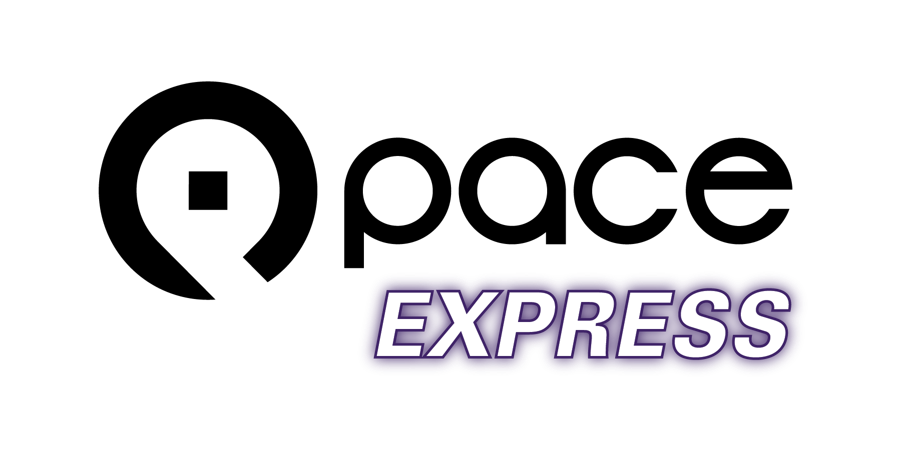

Overview
- Operator: Pace
- Garage: River
- Vehicle: ElDorado National Axess BRT

Route
- Route type: Express bus
- Locale: Golden Corridor
- Communities served: Rosemont, Schaumburg, Hoffman Estates, Elgin
- Start: Rosemont Transportation Center
- Via: Jane Addams Memorial Tollway
- End: Elgin Transportation Center, Randall Road Station
- Length: 27 mi (43 km)
- Stations: Northwest Transportation Center, Barrington Road Station, IL 25 Station
- Other routes: 606

Service
- Frequency: Peak: 15 minutes Off-peak: 30 minutes/1 hour
- Weekend frequency: Saturday: 30 minutes/1 Hour
- Transfers: Blue (Rosemont); MDW (Elgin)
- Map: https://www.pacebus.com/sites/default/files/2020-07/Express-services-brochure-web_0.pdf

Pace I-90 Express Bus Service is an on highway express bus service between Rosemont Transportation Center and Elgin operated by Pace. The buses operate on the Jane Addams Memorial Tollway and use "flex lanes" to avoid traffic, similar to a bus on shoulder service.

== History ==
Planning for an extension of the Blue Line past O'Hare began in 1998. However, after a series of proposals were presented in 2003, local leaders preferred Metra's STAR Line. When Metra started planning for the STAR Line, surveying revealed natural gas lines that Metra would have to pay to relocate. The project failed to get federal funding.

After the STAR Line failed to get funding, Pace began planning for its I-90 Express service as part of its Vision 2020. The transit proposal was part of a larger Illinois Tollway project to rebuild and widen a portion of the Jane Addams Memorial Tollway from I-39/US 51 in Rockford to I-190/I-294 near O'Hare Airport. The $2.5 billion tollway project, backed by the "Move Illinois" program, mainly took place from 2012 to November 2016.

Service between Rosemont and Elgin, and Schaumburg and Elgin, began in December 2016. On September 5, 2017, the Illinois Tollway activated its SmartRoad technology along a portion of the Jane Addams Memorial Tollway from Barrington Road to the Kennedy Expressway. Along with incorporating active traffic management for other drivers, SmartRoad

allowed Pace buses to use the shoulder ("flex lanes") during times of traffic congestion. In December 2017, the IL 25 Station opened. In August 2018, Barrington Road Station, the on-highway train station like stop, opened, finishing the project.

The Pace Express service has been described as a "mini STAR Line."

== Service ==
The service primarily hosts four routes: 600, 603, 605, and 607. The 606 also travels along I-90 between IL 83 (Elmhurst Road) and Rosemont station.

=== 600: Rosemont - Schaumburg Express ===
Exclusivity operates nonstop between Rosemont Transportation Center and Northwest Transportation Center in Schaumburg. This was a peak-only route before the introduction of the I-90 Express service.

=== 603: Elgin Transportation Center - Rosemont Express ===
Operates between Rosemont Transportation Center and Elgin Transportation Center, stopping at Barrington Road and IL 25.

=== 605: I-90/Randall Rd. Station - Rosemont Express ===
Same route as 603 until IL 25 where it splits and continues on I-90 to Randall Road Station.

=== 607: I-90/Randall Rd. Station - Schaumburg Express ===
Operates between Randall Road and Northwest Transportation Center stopping at IL 25 and Barrington Road.
