= Rosemont station (CTA) =

Chicago "L" station

Rosemont 5800N 10500W
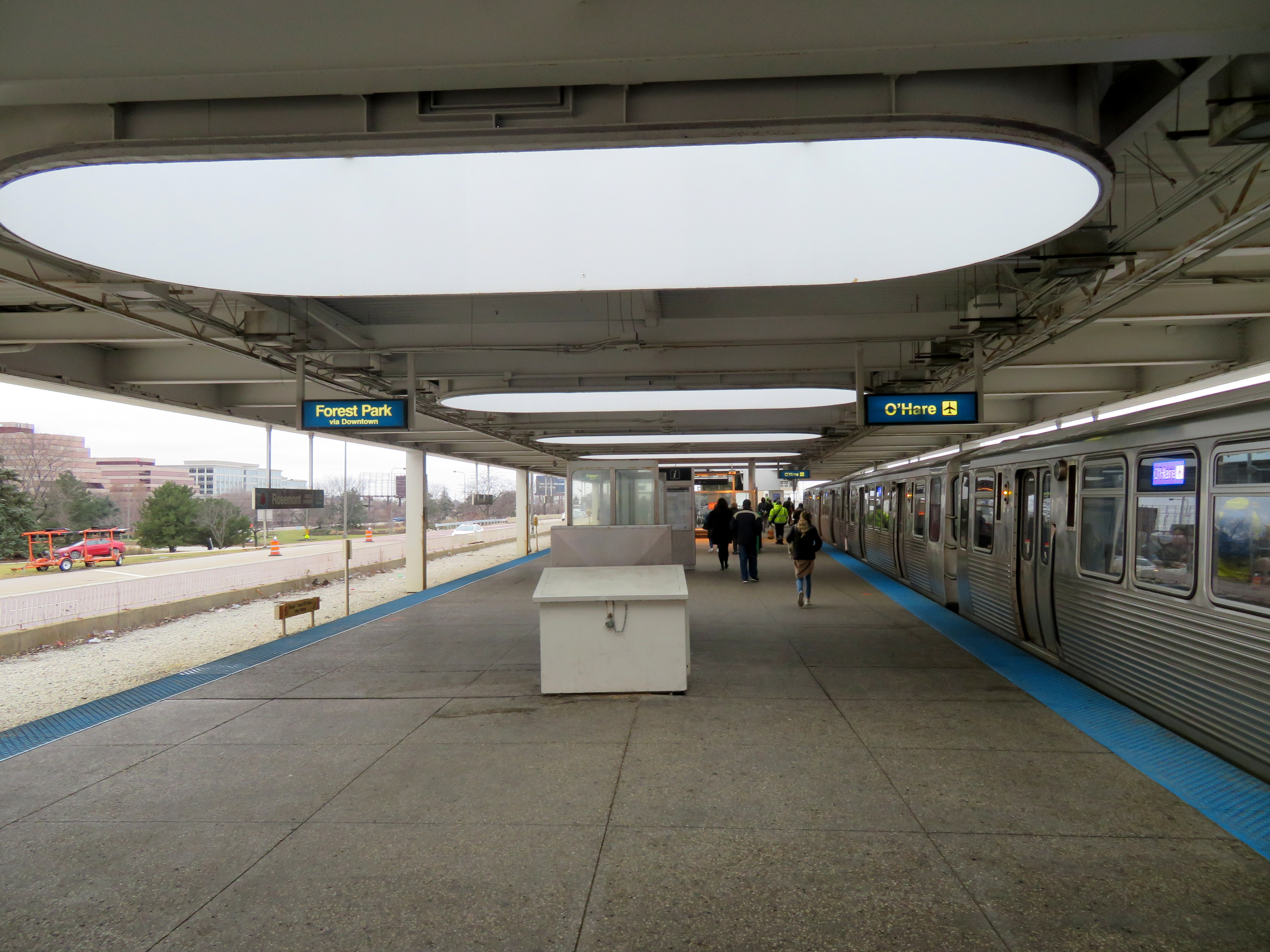
- An O'Hare-bound train stops at the outbound track

General information
- Location: 5801 North River Road; Rosemont, Illinois 60018
- Coordinates: 41.983507°N 87.859388°W
- Owner: Chicago Transit Authority
- Line: O'Hare Branch
- Platforms: 1 island platform
- Tracks: 2
- Connections: Pace Buses

Construction
- Structure type: Expressway median
- Parking: 798 Spaces
- Cycle facilities: Yes
- Accessible: Yes

History
- Opened: February 27, 1983; 43 years ago
- Former names: River Road

Passengers
- 2025: 1,253,057 ▲0.8%

Services
Preceding station	Chicago "L"	Following station
O'Hare Terminus	Blue Line	Cumberland toward Forest Park
Track layout
Location

Rosemont, formerly River Road, is a Chicago "L" station at the intersection of River Road and I-190 in the suburb of Rosemont, Illinois. It is located in the median of I-190 with one island platform serving two tracks, 16 miles (26 km) northwest of The Loop. Trains are scheduled to depart from Rosemont every 2–7 minutes during rush-hour periods, and take about 36 minutes to travel to the Loop. The station is 7 blocks east and 2 blocks north of O'Hare International Airport. Rosemont is the busiest station outside the city limits of Chicago, with 2,090,977 passenger entries in 2014.

== History ==
The Rosemont station opened on February 27, 1983, as the terminus of an extension of the West-Northwest route from its former terminal at Jefferson Park. It was built to a design by the architectural firm Murphy/Jahn. The station served as the temporary terminal for the West-Northwest route until the terminal at O'Hare opened a year later. Prior to the 1990s, the station was known as River Road, as the CTA did not feel that the names of stations should advertise cities outside Chicago limits. The station name was changed in the mid-1990s, around the same time that the Dempster–Skokie and Des Plaines terminals on the Yellow and Blue Lines were renamed to reflect the suburb they serviced rather than the cross street.

The platform is wedge-shaped, with the width increasing from east to west, due to the Rosemont Yard sitting immediately west of the station, between the inbound and outbound tracks.

== Services ==
Rosemont is the terminus to many Pace bus routes. In addition, there is a parking lot for commuters that costs $7 USD for 14 hours of allowed time. Due to the station's close proximity to many airport hotels, a visitors pass machine is also found in the station. Just west of the station is a maintenance facility built in a wide spot of the freeway's median. The station contains a Dunkin' Donuts doughnut stand, which was installed in September 2004.

Rosemont serves as the eastern terminus for Pace I-90 Express service. This BRT provides on-highway express service all the way to Elgin.

It is located only 1 mile from the City of Des Plaines at its westernmost border. The Rosemont station handles more suburban commuters from Des Plaines than any other suburb, including Rosemont itself.

== Bus connections ==
Pace

- 221 Wolf Road (weekdays only)
- 223 Elk Grove/Rosemont CTA Station
- 230 South Des Plaines (weekdays only)
- 303 Forest Park/Rosemont (weekdays only)
- 330 Mannheim/LaGrange Roads
- 332 River Road/York Road
- I-90 Express:
  - 600 Rosemont/Schaumburg Express (Monday–Saturday only)
  - 603 Elgin Transportation Center/Rosemont Express (Monday–Saturday only)
  - 605 I-90/Randall Road Park-n-Ride/Rosemont Express (Monday–Saturday only)
- 606 Rosemont/Schaumburg Limited
- 811 Rosemont Entertainment Circulator

== Image gallery ==
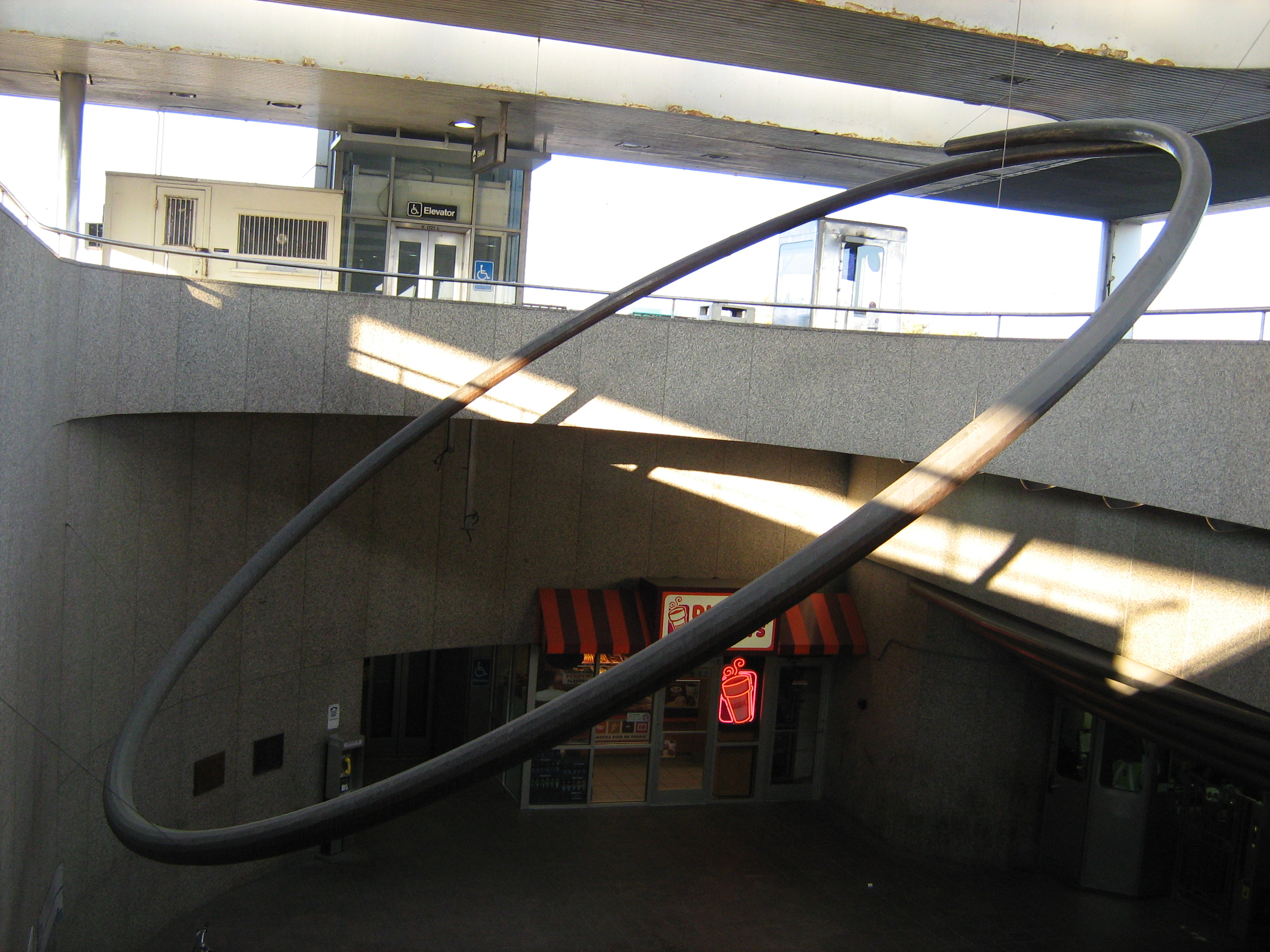
River Road Ring, November 2007

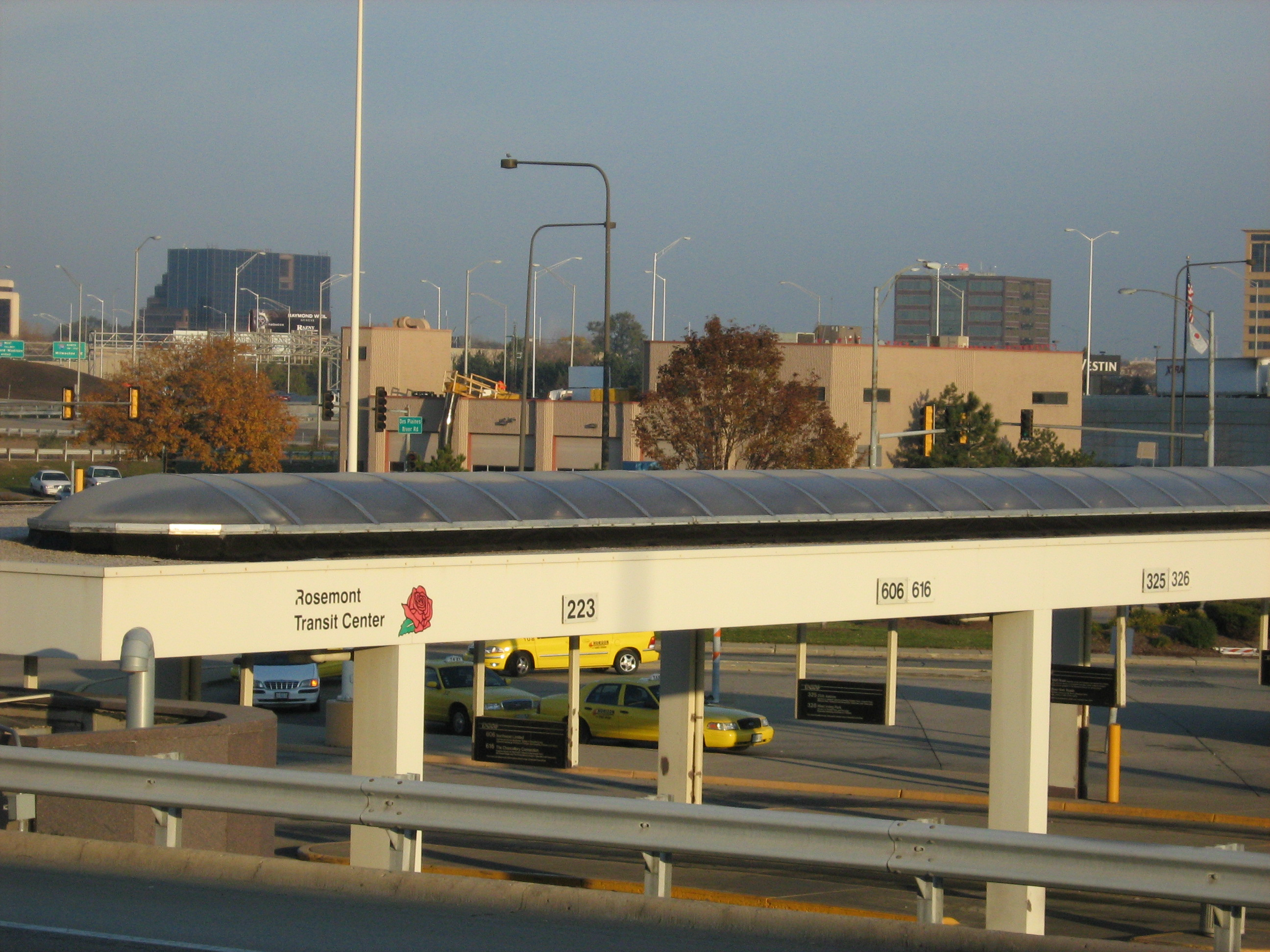
Bus Terminal, November 2007

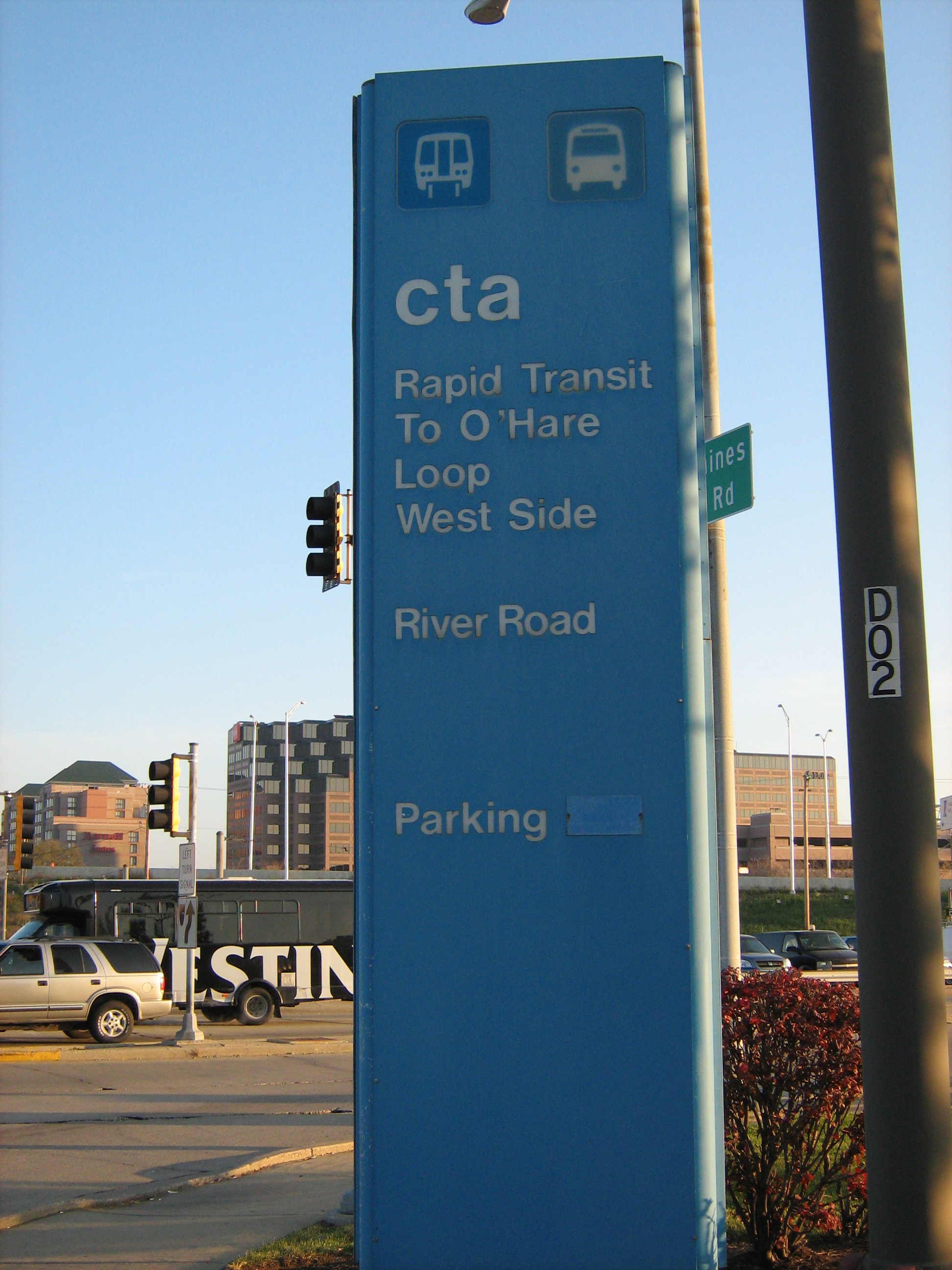
Rosemont Transit Center Sign, November 2007
