= National Street/Elgin station =

Commuter rail station in Elgin, Illinois

National Street

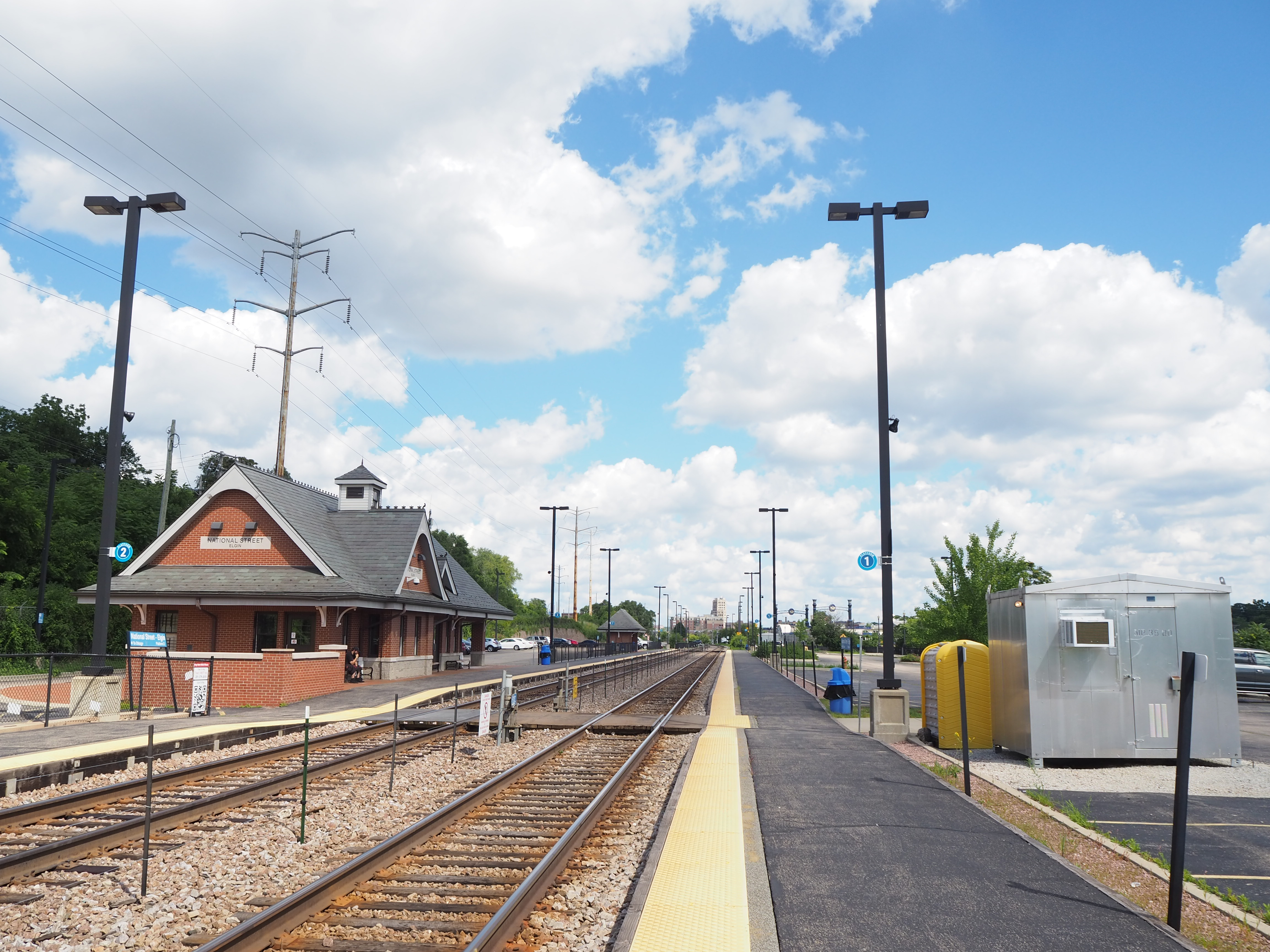
- National Street station in July 2022

General information
- Location: 85 National Street; Elgin, Illinois 60121
- Coordinates: 42.0264°N 88.2788°W
- Owner: Metra
- Line: Elgin Subdivision
- Platforms: 2 side platforms
- Tracks: 2
- Connections: Pace Buses

Construction
- Accessible: Yes

Other information
- Fare zone: 4

History
- Opened: 1950

Passengers
- 2018: 584 (average weekday) ▼9%
- Rank: 89 out of 236

Services
Preceding station	Metra	Following station
Elgin toward Big Timber/Elgin	Milwaukee District West	Bartlett toward Union Station
Former services
Preceding station	Milwaukee Road	Following station
Elgin Terminus	Suburban Service West Line	Spaulding toward Chicago
Track layout
Location

National Street is one of three stations on Metra's Milwaukee District West Line in Elgin, Illinois. The station is 36.0 miles (57.9 km) away from Chicago Union Station, the eastern terminus of the line. In Metra's zone-based fare system, National Street is in zone 4. As of 2018, National Street is the 89th busiest of Metra's 236 non-downtown stations, with an average of 584 weekday boardings. National Street was also used by commuter trains of the Milwaukee Road, the predecessor to Metra.

As of February 15, 2024, National Street is served by 45 trains (23 inbound, 22 outbound) on weekdays, by all 24 trains (12 in each direction) on Saturdays, and by all 18 trains (nine in each direction) on Sundays and holidays. On weekdays, one inbound train originates from here, and one outbound train terminates here.

The station is adjacent to the site of the former Elgin National Watch Company.

== Bus connections ==
Pace

- "Route 546 – Orange/Walnut". PaceBus.com. Chicago: Pace Suburban Bus Service.
- "Route 801 – Elgin/Geneva". PaceBus.com. Chicago: Pace Suburban Bus Service.
