= Arrow (Milwaukee Road train) =

Former passenger train

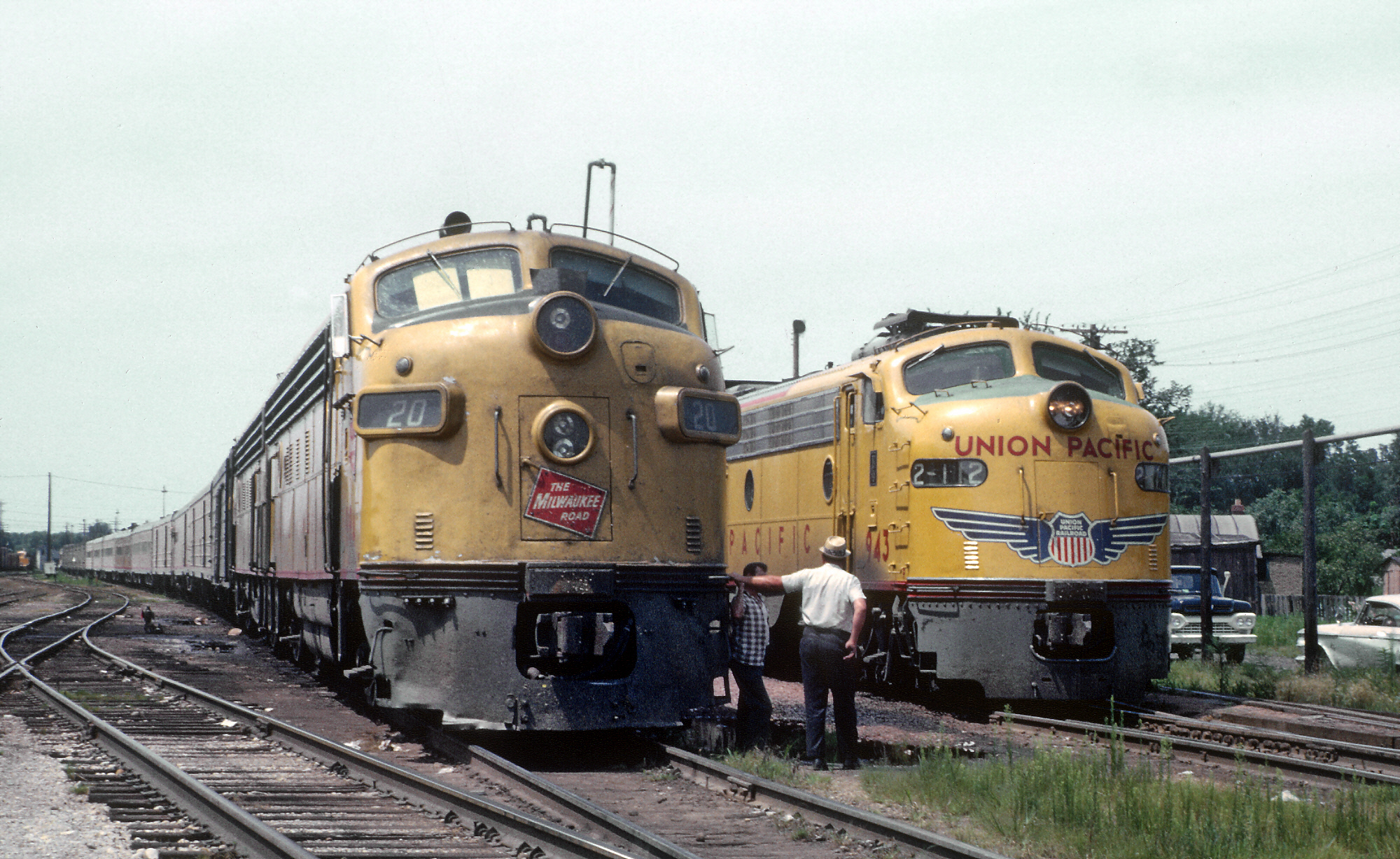
- The Arrow (left) alongside the Union Pacific's City of Denver (right) in Savanna, Illinois in 1963

Overview
- Predecessor: Omaha Limited, Sioux City Limited
- First service: August 1926
- Last service: October 5, 1967
- Former operator: Chicago, Milwaukee, St. Paul and Pacific Railroad

Route
- Termini: Chicago, Illinois; Omaha, Nebraska or Sioux Falls, South Dakota
- Distance travelled: 488 miles (785 km) (Chicago-Omaha), 604 miles (972 km) (Chicago-Sioux Falls)
- Service frequency: Daily
- Train numbers: 19/20 (Chicago-Omaha), 219/220 (Chicago-Sioux Falls)

The Arrow was a passenger train operated by the Chicago, Milwaukee, St. Paul and Pacific Railroad (the "Milwaukee Road") between Chicago, Illinois and Omaha, Nebraska. It operated from 1926 until 1967. The Arrow provided overnight service between the two cities and included through cars for other destinations in Iowa and South Dakota.

== History ==
The Milwaukee Road introduced the Arrow in August 1926, replacing two previous services: the Omaha Limited (Chicago–Omaha) and Sioux City Limited (Chicago–Sioux City). The new train served both Omaha and Sioux City (for Sioux Falls, South Dakota), splitting in Manilla, Iowa. Through connections with other trains the Arrow also carried Chicago–Des Moines, Iowa and Milwaukee, Wisconsin–Omaha sleeping cars (via the Southwest Limited). The train made the run between Chicago and Omaha in 13 hours and 20 minutes. In 1934 the Milwaukee Road extended the Arrow over the Big Sioux River to Sioux Falls.

The Omaha sleeping car ended in early 1955, but was reinstated later that year when the Milwaukee Road took over the handling and operations of the Union Pacific Railroad's Overland Route trains between Chicago and Omaha from the latter's would-be merger mate the Chicago & North Western Railway, and ended for good in 1958. Between 1956 and 1959 the Arrow carried a Chicago–Los Angeles coach which it exchanged in Omaha. The Sioux Falls section, including the train's last sleeping cars, ended on September 17, 1965. All that remained of the Arrow was a Chicago–Omaha coach train, which the Milwaukee Road discontinued on October 5, 1967. Today, its route is being used by Metra as its Milwaukee District West Line, shared by the Milwaukee Road's successor, Canadian Pacific through its Soo Line Railroad subsidiary.
