= Southwest Limited (Milwaukee Road train) =

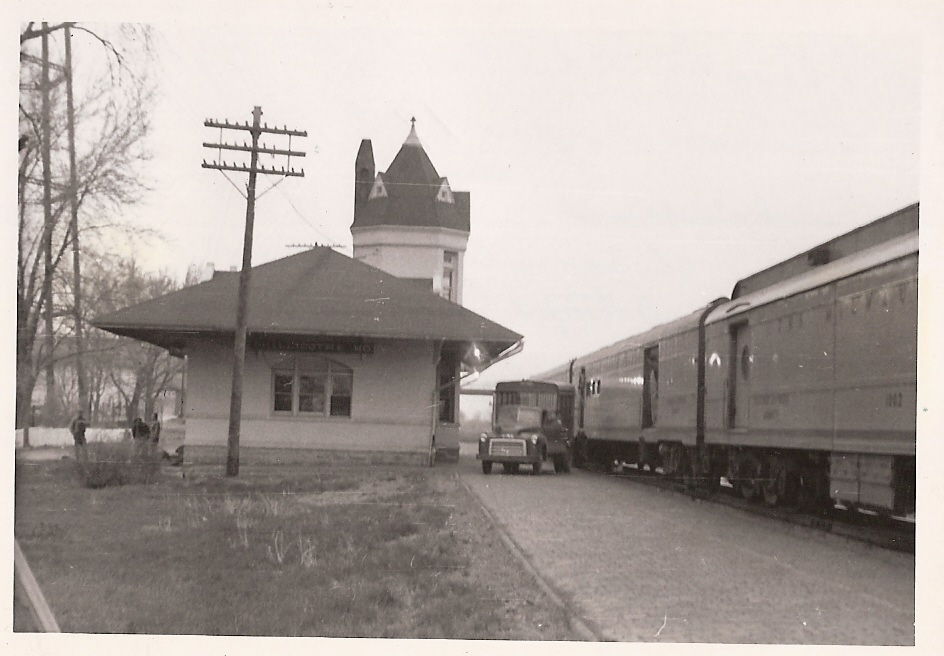
- The Southwest Limited at Chillicothe, Missouri in 1958

Overview
- Last service: April 26, 1958
- Former operator: Chicago, Milwaukee, St. Paul and Pacific Railroad

Route
- Termini: Chicago, Illinois or Milwaukee, Wisconsin; Kansas City, Missouri
- Distance travelled: 504 miles (811 km) (Chicago-Kansas City); 523 miles (842 km) (Milwaukee-Kansas City)
- Service frequency: Daily

Technical
- Timetable number: 25/26

The Southwest Limited was a named passenger train operated by the Chicago, Milwaukee, St. Paul and Pacific Railroad (the "Milwaukee Road") on an overnight schedule between Chicago, Illinois, and Kansas City, Missouri. The westbound train (to Kansas City) was Milwaukee Road train No. 25, and the eastbound train (to Chicago) was train No. 26. For much of the train's history, a section of the Southwest Limited also operated between Kansas City and Milwaukee, Wisconsin.

== History ==
The Milwaukee Road completed its first Chicago-Kansas City route in 1887, and began operating through passenger service between those cities soon after. The Milwaukee's route became more competitive in 1903, with the completion of a cutoff line in Iowa that reduced Kansas City travel time by some three hours. In conjunction with this improvement, the railroad inaugurated the Southwest Limited passenger train on the Kansas City route, utilizing new equipment and a faster schedule.

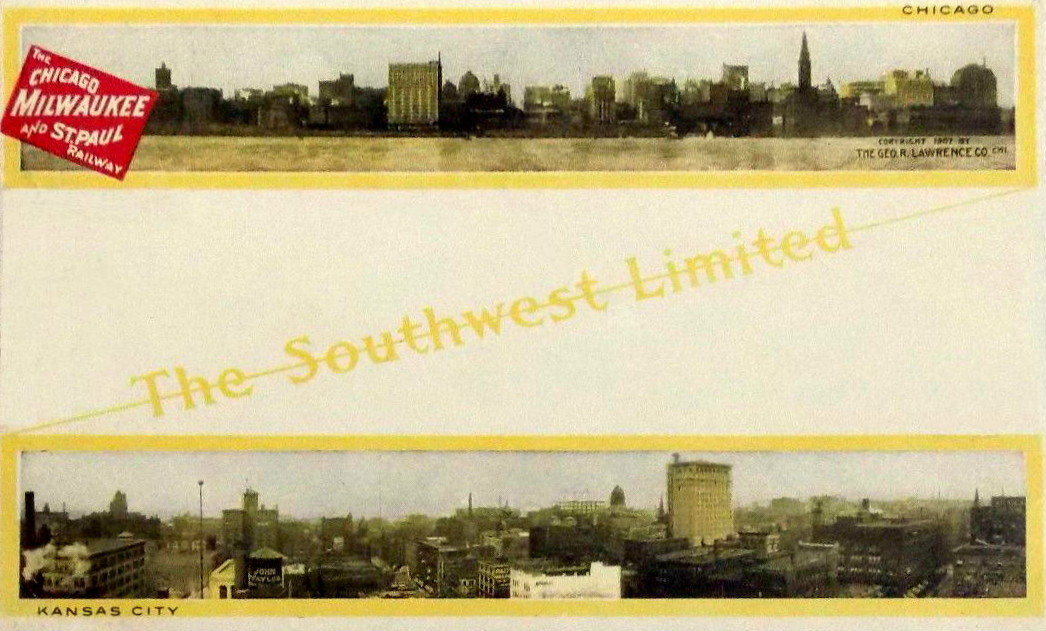
1908 postcard for the train.

The Southwest Limited prospered for the next three decades. The 1920s were reportedly the glory years for the train, when it featured a variety of sleeping car and coach accommodations, a dining car, and an observation-lounge. Service standards were high, and the Southwest Limited was considered one of the premier trains of the Milwaukee.

About 1932, the Southwest Limited began offering through-car service between Kansas City and Milwaukee. The Milwaukee section connected with the main train at Savanna, IL. At the same time, due to traffic declines caused by the Great Depression, the Southwest Limited was combined with the Chicago-Omaha Arrow between Chicago and Savanna. The Milwaukee section of the Southwest Limited also carried through cars to and from the Arrow's western destinations.

By the early 1950s, the Southwest Limited was clearly in decline. The train no longer carried sleeping or dining cars, and its 13-1/2 hour schedule was at least four hours slower than that of new Chicago-Kansas City streamliners then operated by the competing Burlington and Santa Fe railroads. The increasing popularity of air and automobile travel during the 1950s also negatively impacted the train. The final runs of the Southwest Limited took place on April 26, 1958, marking the end of Milwaukee Road passenger service to Kansas City. The Milwaukee-Savanna section of the train was retained until 1965, serving as a connection to the Arrow.
