= Pace Suburban Bus =

Transit system in northeastern Illinois

- A Pace Bus New Flyer XD40 on Route 313 in Oak Park
- Parent: Northern Illinois Transit Authority
- Founded: 1984; 42 years ago
- Headquarters: Arlington Heights, Illinois
- Locale: Northeastern Illinois
- Service area: Cook, Lake, Will, Kane, McHenry, and DuPage Counties
- Service type: Transit bus, Bus rapid transit, Paratransit, Demand response, Vanpool
- Routes: 134
- Fleet: 733 fixed-route buses 401 Vanpools; 11 On Demand services 1,230 Paratransit vehicles 37 Dial-a-Ride services
- Daily ridership: 81,800 (weekdays, Q2 2026)
- Annual ridership: 20,085,800 (2025)
- Fuel type: CNG, Battery-electric, Diesel, Diesel-Electric Hybrid
- Executive Director: Melinda Metzger
- Website: pacebus.com

Pace Suburban Bus, officially the Suburban Bus Division of the Northern Illinois Transit Authority, is a public transit agency serving suburban communities in the Chicago metropolitan area of Illinois, United States. The agency was founded in 1984 and provides transportation services for residents of 274 municipalities located throughout Cook, DuPage, Kane, Lake, McHenry, and Will counties. One of the largest suburban transit providers in North America, Pace covers 3,677 square miles and serves approximately 127,000 daily riders.

Pace operates the only public paratransit service in northeastern Illinois. In 2025, Pace reported ridership of approximately 16.4 million, representing 67% of pre-pandemic levels.

Like Metra and the Chicago Transit Authority (CTA), Pace forms part of the Northern Illinois Transit Authority (NITA).

== Operations ==
Pace serves the northeastern Illinois region, including Cook County (where the City of Chicago is located), and the region's collar counties, which include DuPage, Kane, Lake, McHenry, and Will counties. Additionally, some of Pace's bus routes serve parts of Northwest Indiana. In areas like Evanston, River Forest, Oak Park, Cicero, and Skokie, both Pace and the CTA provide bus service.

Many of Pace's route terminals are located at CTA rail stations, bus terminals, and Metra stations. Pace, CTA, and Metra use a shared ride payment system called Ventra. Passengers paying their fare through a Ventra connected account can obtain interservice transfers.

== Services ==
=== Fixed Bus Routes ===
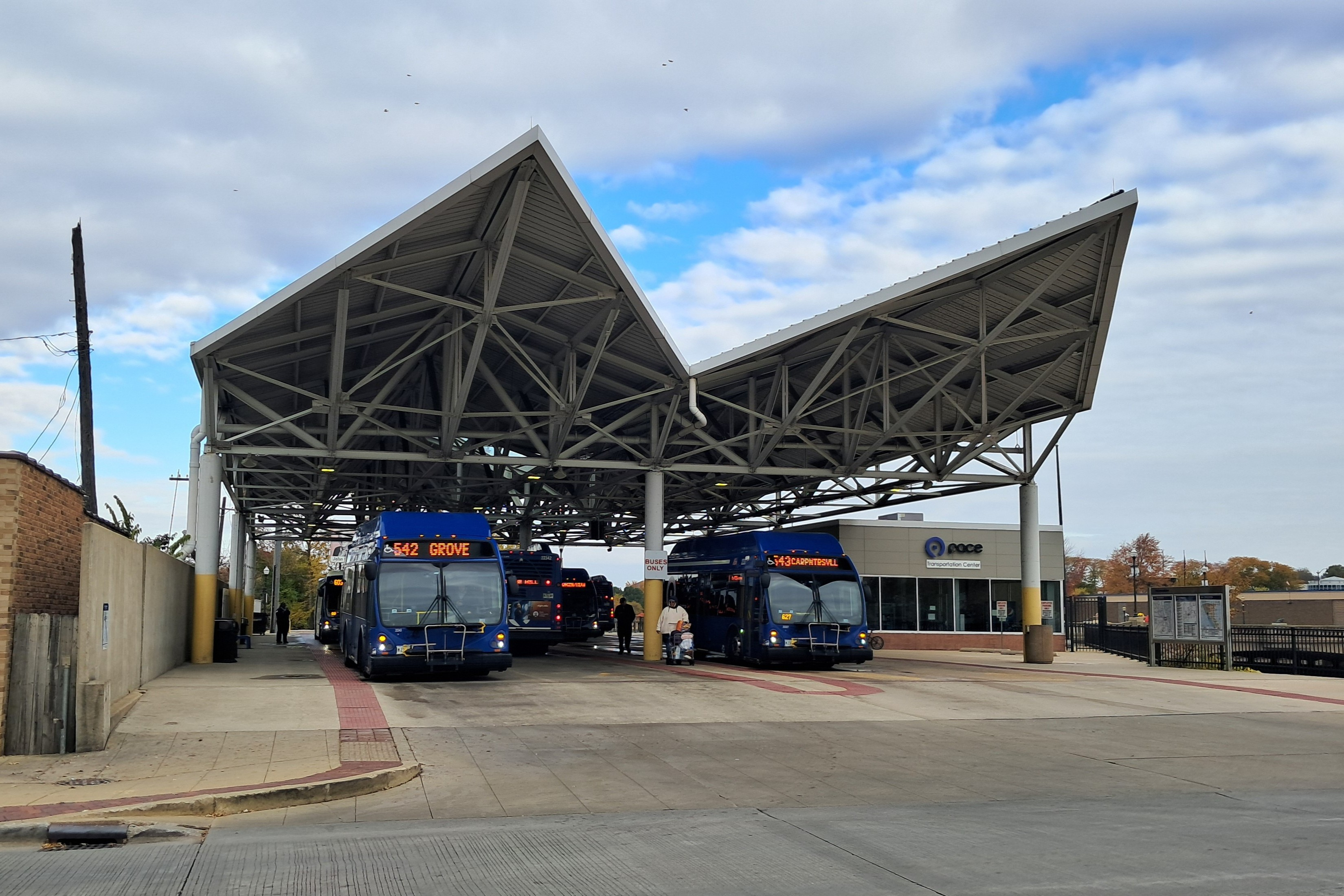
Pace buses at the Elgin Transportation Center

Pace's bus services operate on fixed routes; many run seven days a week, while others operate only during peak hours.

=== Pulse Rapid Transit ===
Pace Pulse Bus at Jefferson Park Transit Center

In 2019, Pace began operating a rapid transit line called Pulse, intended to connect riders to population and business centers along the major transit corridors. Current Pulse Rapid Transit lines include the Milwaukee line and the Dempster Line, with future lines planned to expand the rapid transit network.

=== Expressway-based routes ===
Pace operates many routes on expressways throughout northeastern Illinois. These expressway-based routes allow Pace buses to bypass traffic either on the shoulders of the expressways or in designated flex lanes. Pace partners with the Illinois Department of Transportation (IDOT) and the Illinois Tollway to provide express service without expensive infrastructure projects.

Pace currently operates three expressway-based routes, with work underway to add a fourth express bus service along I-290/I-88 that would connect riders in the western suburbs of the region to the City of Chicago.

==== I-55 Express ====
Passengers boarding an I-55 express bus in downtown Chicago

Due to a change in Illinois law, Pace implemented bus-on-shoulder service in 2011 along the Stevenson Expressway (I-55) as part of a multi-year demonstration project. In 2014, the Illinois General Assembly and the Illinois Governor enacted legislation that permanently allowed bus-on-shoulder service and expanded the transit option to all expressways and tollways within northeastern Illinois.

Since 2011, Pace has expanded its service along the I-55 corridor several times. The agency additionally established a pilot program in August 2024 to expand weekday service along routes that make up the I-55 Express service. The response from riders has caused Pace to propose making the service expansion permanent. As a result of these expansions, service along the I-55 corridor saw a nearly 8 percent increase in year-over-year ridership from January 2024 to January 2025.

==== I-90 Express ====
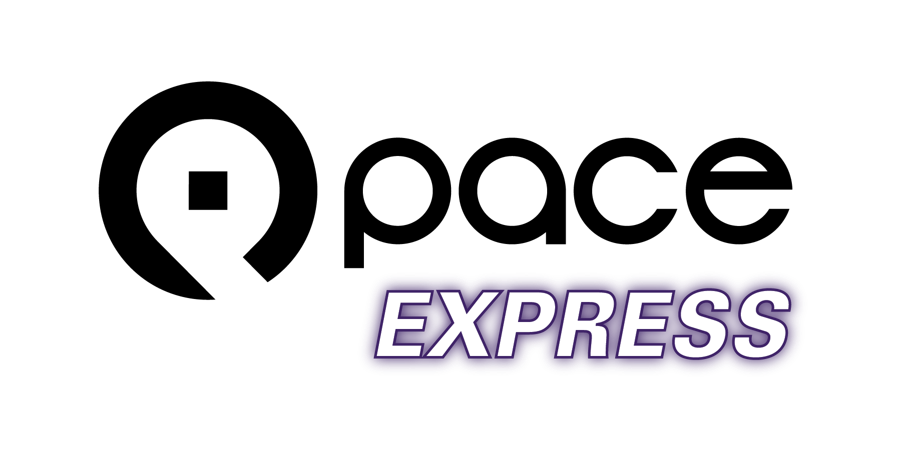
Pace Express Logo

In December 2016, Pace began offering I-90 Express service along the Jane Addams Memorial Tollway (I-90), providing express service between the Rosemont Transportation Center and the Elgin Transportation Center. The service uses "flex lanes" located along the left-hand side shoulders of the road when traffic congestion slows speeds. Pace coordinates with the Illinois Tollway when deciding to use flex lanes, which are also used for regular emergency purposes.

As part of the Illinois Tollway's Central Tri-State construction project, flex lanes will be constructed along the Tri-State Tollway (I-294), allowing Pace to expand its use of expressway-based routes to more areas in northeastern Illinois.

==== I-94 Express ====
In April 2018, Pace launched bus-on-shoulder operations on the Edens Expressway (I-94). The operations serve riders in the northwest suburbs and provide commuters from Chicago and North Shore communities with additional access to destinations within the Lake Cook Road corridor.

=== Paratransit ===
In 2006, Pace became responsible for providing paratransit services throughout the Chicagoland region. Pace's paratransit services are provided for eligible customers whose conditions prevent them from using CTA or Pace fixed-route services for some or all of their travel. Trips are provided only at the same times and within the same geographic areas as fixed-route service. Riders also have access to other reservation-based services and Pace's fixed-route service, which includes free fares for eligible individuals. Pace fixed-route buses are also equipped with accessibility features. Several Pace demand-response programs operate throughout the suburbs of northeastern Illinois, including countywide services and local dial-a-rides. In most cases, Pace has a financial partnership with a county, city, or township to pay for and operate the service. These demand-response programs have different rules on fares, geographic boundaries, and passenger eligibility.

=== Vanpool Incentive Program ===
The Pace Vanpool Incentive Program allows groups of commuters to travel together to destinations and reduce the number of vehicles on the road as a result. The program is available to commuters throughout the six counties of northeastern Illinois. Vanpool riders pay a monthly fare to Pace based on distance, participation, and group size. Pace offers flexible fares for various commuting patterns. Riders are also eligible for tax benefits and employer subsidies.

In 2022, Pace released VanGo, a vanpool alternative that allows commuters to reserve a van for a day to travel to destinations within a defined zone based around rail stations in the region. VanGo was released with the intent of being used by commuters without access to a personal vehicle to travel to and from their destinations from the train station and complete other trips within the defined zone. There are four VanGo zones near train stations in Deerfield, Itasca, nd Rosemont, Lake Forest, and Palatine.

Under the Municipal Vanpool Program, Pace provides a van to a municipality for any public transportation purpose, such as demand response service for senior citizens.

== Facilities ==
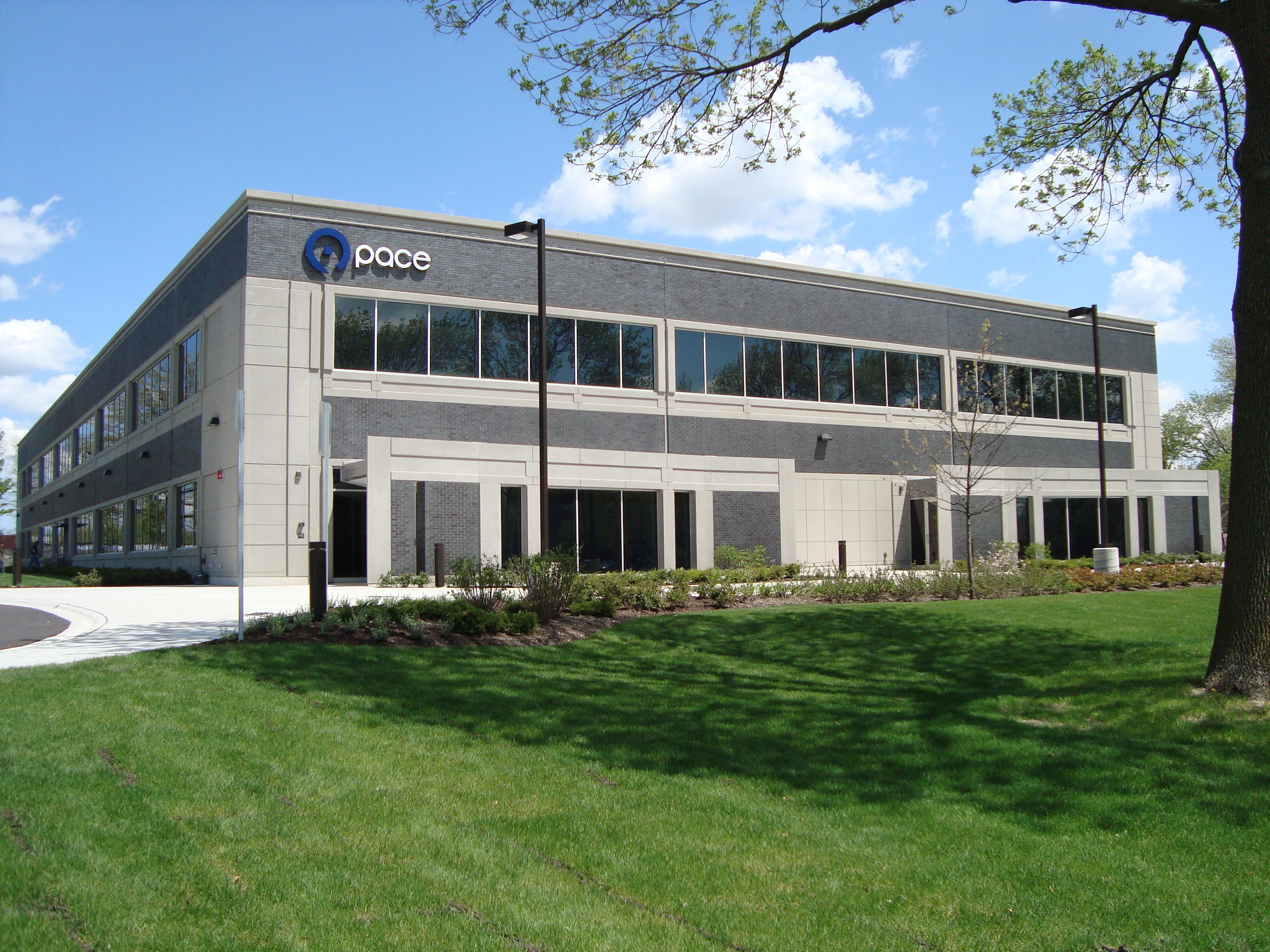
Pace Headquarters in Arlington Heights, Illinois

Pace owns 12 facilities, including ten bus garages (also called operating divisions), a paratransit office in Chicago, and its headquarters in Arlington Heights.

In July 2024, Pace formally opened its South Campus in Markham, Illinois, which contains administrative offices and a bus acceptance facility for intaking new vehicles to its fleet.

Operating Division	Garage Location	Areas Served
Fox Valley	North Aurora	Aurora and Naperville areas
Heritage	Plainfield	Will County, Joliet, and southwest suburbs
North	Waukegan	Lake County
North Shore	Evanston	North Cook County and southeast Lake County
Northwest	Des Plaines	Northwest Cook County
River	Elgin	Greater Elgin Area and far western suburbs
South	Markham	South Cook County, South Side of Chicago, and DuPage County
Southwest	Bridgeview	Southwest Cook County and South Side of Chicago
West	Melrose Park	West Cook County and DuPage County

== Fleet ==
Photos	Year	Type	Quantity
	2006-2011	EZ-Rider II MAX 30	234
	2012-2022	ENC Axess BRT series	514
	2014-2017	MCI D-Series	37
	2020	New Flyer Xcelsior XD40	84
	2021	Gillig Low Floor EV 40	48
