= Chicago, Burlington and Quincy Railroad Depot =

Chicago, Burlington and Quincy Depot, Chicago, Burlington, and Quincy Station, or Burlington Route Depot is the name of several railway stations or depots, including:

- Any one of many railroad stations of the Chicago, Burlington and Quincy Railroad

== Colorado ==
- Brush Depot, located on the main line between Chicago and Denver
- Denver Union Station, western terminus of Chicago-Denver main line, terminal for Colorado & Southern trains
- Fort Morgan Depot, located on the main line between Chicago and Denver
- Sterling Depot, located on the line between Alliance and Brush

== Illinois ==
- Halsted Street station, located on the commuter line between Chicago and Aurora
- Riverside station (Illinois), located on the commuter line between Chicago and Aurora
- Downers Grove station, located on the commuter line between Chicago and Aurora
- Naperville station, located on the commuter line between Chicago and Aurora
- Aurora station (Illinois), located on the commuter line between Chicago and Aurora
- Batavia station, listed on the NRHP in Illinois, located on the line between Aurora and West Chicago
- Canton station, listed on the NRHP in Illinois, located on the line between St. Louis and Savanna
- Yates City station, located on the line between St. Louis and Savanna
- Fulton station (Illinois), located on the line between St. Louis and Savanna, Illinois
- Oregon station, listed on the NRHP in Illinois, located on the mainline between Minneapolis and Chicago
- East Dubuque station, located on the mainline between Minneapolis and Chicago
- Plano (Amtrak station), also known as Chicago, Burlington and Quincy Railroad Depot, listed on the NRHP in Plano, Illinois, located on the mainline between Chicago and Denver
- Earlville station, located on the mainline between Chicago and Denver in Earlville, Illinois
- Mendota station, located on the main line between Chicago and Denver
- Princeton station, located on the main line between Chicago and Denver
- Yorkville station, located on the branch line between Montgomery and Streator
- Ottawa station (Illinois), located on the branch line between Montgomery and Streator
- Streator station, located on the branch line between Montgomery and Streator
- La Moille station, located on the line between Mendota and Denrock, Illinois
- Tampico station, located on the line between Mendota and Denrock
- Sterling station, located on the line between Shabbona and Sterling, Illinois
- Wyoming station, listed on the NRHP in Illinois, located on the line between St. Louis and Savanna
- Macomb station located on the line between Kansas City and Galesburg

== Iowa ==
- Burlington station, listed on the NRHP in Iowa, located on the main line between Chicago and Denver
- Chicago, Burlington and Quincy Railroad Depot (Centerville, Iowa), listed on the NRHP in Iowa
- Chicago, Burlington, and Quincy Freight House-Chariton, Chariton, IA, listed on the NRHP in Iowa
- Clinton station (Iowa), located on the line between Barstow and Clinton
- Council Bluffs station, located on the main line between Chicago and Denver
- Chicago, Burlington and Quincy Railroad-Creston Station, Creston, IA, listed on the NRHP in Iowa
- Des Moines Union Station, located on a secondary line connection with Chicago-Denver main line at Albia
- Keokuk station, located on the line between St. Lous and Burlington
- Chicago, Burlington and Quincy Depot (Osceola, Iowa), listed on the NRHP in Iowa
- Ottumwa station, located on the main line between Chicago and Denver
- Red Oak station, listed on the NRHP in Iowa
- Sioux City station, located on the line between Ashland and Sioux City
- Davenport station (Iowa), located in Iowa

== Missouri ==
- Alexandria station (Missouri), located on the line between St. Louis and Burlington
- Canton station (Missouri), located on the line between St. Louis and Burlington
- Clarksville station (Missouri), located on the line between St. Louis and Burlington
- Elsberry station, located on the line between St. Louis and Burlington
- Ely station (Missouri), located on the line between Kansas City and Galesburg
- Hannibal station, located on the line between St. Louis and Burlington
- Kansas City Union Station, hub for Burlington lines in Western Missouri
- Louisiana station, located on the line between St. Louis and Burlington
- Mexico station (Missouri), located on the line between Kansas City and St. Louis
- Monroe City station, located on the line between Kansas City and Galesburg
- Mound City Depot, listed on the NRHP in Missouri
- Old Monroe station, located on the line between St. Louis and Burlington
- Palmyra station (Missouri), located on the line between Kansas City and Galesburg
- St. Joseph station (Missouri), located on the line between Kansas City and Omaha
- St. Louis Union Station, hub for Burlington lines in Eastern Missouri
- West Alton station, located on the line between St. Louis and Burlington
- West Quincy station, located on the line between Kansas City and Galesburg

== Nebraska ==
- Alliance Depot, located on the line between Billings and Table Rock
- Grand Island Depot, located on the line between Billings and Table Rock
- Hastings Depot, located on the main line between Chicago and Denver
- Holdrege Depot, located on the main line between Chicago and Denver
- Lincoln Depot (Nebraska), located on the main line between Chicago and Denver
- McCook Depot, located on the main line between Chicago and Denver
- Nebraska City Depot, located on the line between Lincoln and Payne
- Northport Depot, located on the line between Alliance and Brush
- Omaha Burlington Station, major hub for Burlington lines in Plains states
- Oxford Depot, located on the main line between Chicago and Denver
- Scottsbluff Depot, located on the line between Wendover and Northport
- Superior Depot, located on the line between Napier and Oxford

== Wisconsin ==
- Alma Depot (Wisconsin), located on the line between Chicago and Minneapolis
- Cassville Depot, located on the line between Chicago and Minneapolis
- East Winona Depot, located on the line between Chicago and Minneapolis
- Genoa Depot, located on the line between Chicago and Minneapolis
- La Crosse Depot, located on the line between Chicago and Minneapolis
- Maiden Rock Depot, located on the line between Chicago and Minneapolis
- North La Crosse Depot, located on the line between Chicago and Minneapolis
- Prairie du Chien Depot, located on the line between Chicago and Minneapolis
- St. Croix Depot, located on the line between Chicago and Minneapolis
- Trempealeau Depot, located on the line between Chicago and Minneapolis

== See also ==
- Chicago, Burlington, & Quincy Roundhouse and Locomotive Shop, Aurora, IL, listed on the NRHP in Illinois
- Chicago, Burlington & Quincy Steam Locomotive No. 710, Lincoln, NE, listed on the NRHP in Nebraska
