= Plano station (Illinois) =

Amtrak intercity train station in Plano, Illinois

Plano, IL
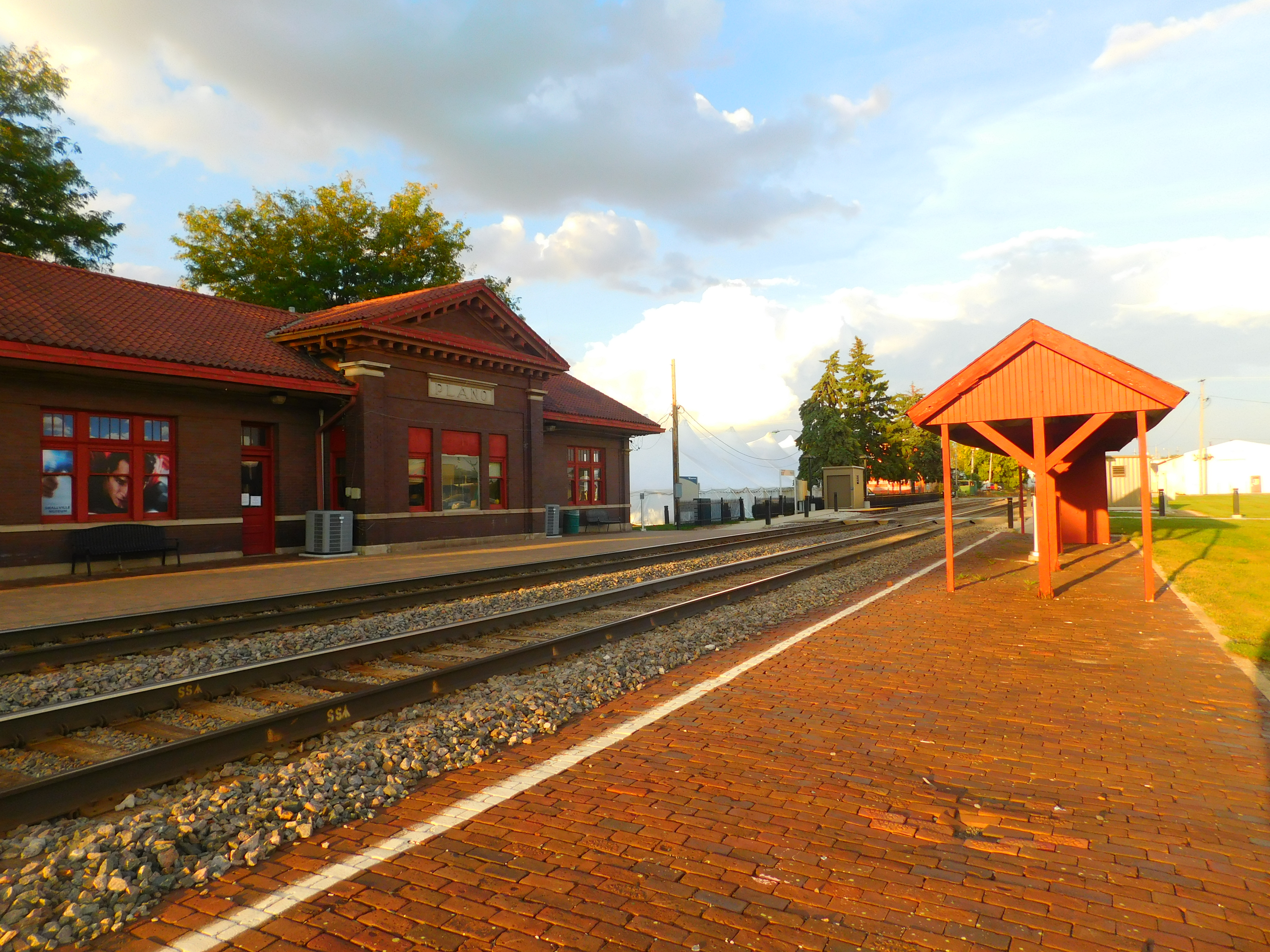
- The station at Plano in September 2016. The former Chicago, Burlington and Quincy Railroad (CB&Q) station is on the left.

General information
- Location: 101 West Main Street; Plano, Illinois
- Coordinates: 41.6621°N 88.5407°W
- Owner: BNSF Railway
- Line: BNSF Mendota Subdivision
- Platforms: 2 side platforms
- Tracks: 2
- Connections: KAT (dial-a-ride)

Construction
- Parking: Yes

Other information
- Station code: Amtrak: PLO

History
- Opened: 1913

Passengers
- FY 2025: 5,725 (Amtrak)

Services
Preceding station	Amtrak	Following station
Mendota toward Quincy	Illinois Zephyr and Carl Sandburg	Naperville toward Chicago
California Zephyr does not stop here
Southwest Chief does not stop here
Former services
Preceding station	Burlington Route	Following station
Sandwich toward Denver	Main Line	Bristol toward Chicago
Future services
Preceding station	Amtrak	Following station
Mendota toward Moline	Quad Cities Proposed	Naperville toward Chicago
- Chicago, Burlington and Quincy Railroad Depot
- U.S. National Register of Historic Places
- Interactive map of Chicago, Burlington and Quincy Railroad Depot
- Area: less than one acre
- Architect: Eidelgeorge Reuter and Company
- NRHP reference No.: 93001238
- Added to NRHP: November 12, 1993
Location

Plano station, also known as the Chicago, Burlington and Quincy Railroad Depot, is an Amtrak intercity train station in Plano, Illinois, United States. The station was added to the U.S. National Register of Historic Places on November 12, 1993.

Currently, four Amtrak trains stop at Plano per day. These serves are the Illinois Zephyr and the Carl Sandburg. The Illinois Zephyr stops in the morning (to Chicago Union Station) and in the evening (to Quincy). The Carl Sandburg stops in the morning (to Quincy) and the evening (to Chicago). The Southwest Chief and California Zephyr pass through the station but do not stop.

Metra has explored extending the BNSF Line to Sandwich, Illinois in the future, and originally proposed the Plano Amtrak station as one of the stops on the proposed extension. However, the proposed station location was changed to near Little Rock road in Plano's city limits, over 1 mile west of the current station.

== Architecture ==
The rectangular Chicago, Burlington and Quincy Railroad Depot in Plano is constructed in a combination of Classical Revival and American Craftsman architectural styles.

== History ==
The building currently being used as the Amtrak station in Plano, Illinois was constructed in 1913 by Eidelgeorge Reuter and Company of Aurora, Illinois. Amtrak service began here on April 30, 1972.

The Plano Amtrak station was added to the U.S. National Register of Historic Places on November 12, 1993 due to its association with Plano's history of rail transportation. The history of the city of Plano is tied to the railroad, the Kendall County city grew around the tracks unlike its neighbors of Yorkville, and Oswego. The Amtrak station at Plano is one of the smallest station houses in the United States.

== In popular culture ==
The movie, "Witless Protection" was filmed in Plano, using the train station as the Police Headquarters in the movie. The station was also featured in the 2013 Superman movie, "Man of Steel", which was filmed in Plano. The station was used as the Village Hall for Superman's hometown of Smallville, Kansas.

== See also ==
- Chicago, Burlington and Quincy Railroad Depot
- National Register of Historic Places listings in Kendall County, Illinois
