= Rock Island station (Rock Island Line) =

Building in Rock Island, Illinois, United States

Rock Island
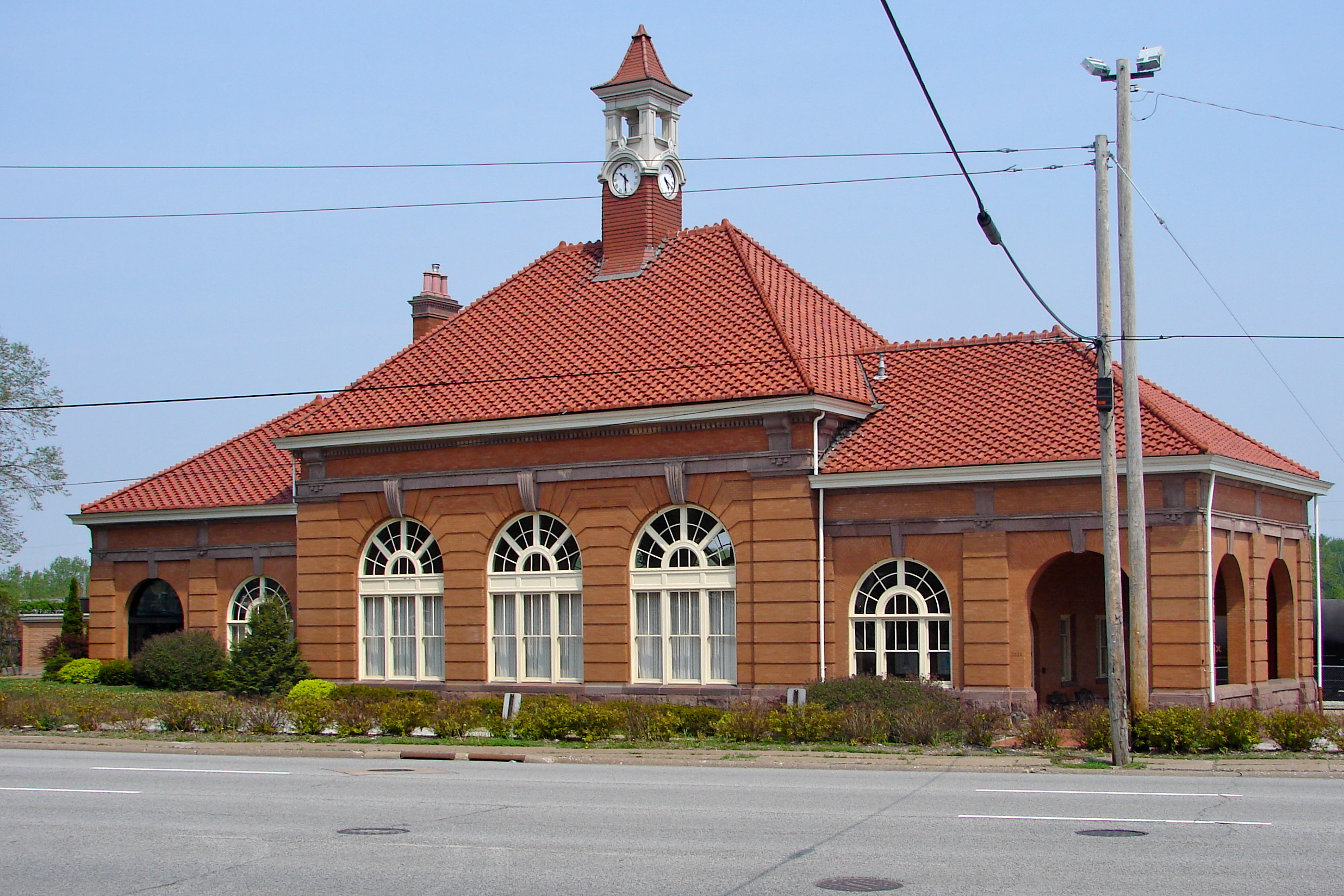
- Rock Island station in May 2011

General information
- Location: 3031 Fifth Avenue, Rock Island, Illinois 61244
- System: Former Rock Island Line passenger rail station

Construction
- Structure type: at-grade

History
- Opened: 1854
- Closed: May 31, 1978
- Rebuilt: 1901

Former services
Preceding station	Chicago, Rock Island and Pacific Railroad	Following station
Davenport toward Colorado Springs	Main Line	Moline toward Chicago
Davenport toward Tucumcari	Tucumcari – Rock Island	Terminus
- Rock Island Lines Passenger Station
- U.S. National Register of Historic Places
- Rock Island Landmark
- Location within Illinois Location within the United States
- Location: 3031 5th Ave. Rock Island, Illinois
- Coordinates: 41°30′29″N 90°33′20″W
- Area: less than one acre
- Built: 1901
- Built by: John Volk
- Architect: Frost & Granger
- Architectural style: Late 19th and early 20th Century Revivals
- NRHP reference No.: 82002596

Significant dates
- Added to NRHP: June 3, 1982
- Designated RIL: 1987
Location

The Rock Island Lines Passenger Station, also known as Abbey Station, is a historic building located in Rock Island, Illinois, United States. It ceased operating as a railway station in 1980. The building was listed on the National Register of Historic Places in 1982, and it was designated a Rock Island landmark in 1987.

== History ==
In 1845 local civic leaders began planning the construction of the railroad to Rock Island. The Chicago, Rock Island & Pacific Railroad finally reached the city from Chicago on February 22, 1854. It was the first time the railroad had reached the Mississippi River. In order to expand further west, the river needed to be crossed. The first railroad bridge across the Mississippi was built between Rock Island and Davenport, Iowa, opening on April 21, 1856. Rock Island became a pivotal location for the movement of people, commodities and raw materials.

The former depot was built in 1901 to serve as the third Rock Island passenger depot. The building was designed by Charles S. Frost of Frost & Granger of Chicago. He had designed over 200 depots in his career for the Chicago & Northwestern Railroad, Milwaukee Road, Great Northern Railroad as well as the Chicago, Rock Island & Pacific. The depot was built by Rock Island contractor John Volk for $75,000 and featured Conosera tiles produced by Ludowici. For many years the depot had as many as 32 arrivals and departures daily, and 21 ticket agents who worked around the clock.

Changes in transportation habits led to the decline in railway travel. The last passenger train left the station on May 31, 1978. The depot itself was closed in April 1980. The building deteriorated until 1994 when the city of Rock Island bought the property from the Iowa Interstate Railroad. In 1996 the city restored the exterior and replaced the clock tower. The deteriorated freight house, which was built of the same materials as the depot, was torn down in 1997. Its bricks and tiles were used in the depot renovations. The depot was sold in 1999 to Abbey Station LLC, which now operates a banquet facility in the building. It is the last railway depot still standing in Rock Island.
