= Mendota station =

Railway station in Illinois, US

Mendota, IL
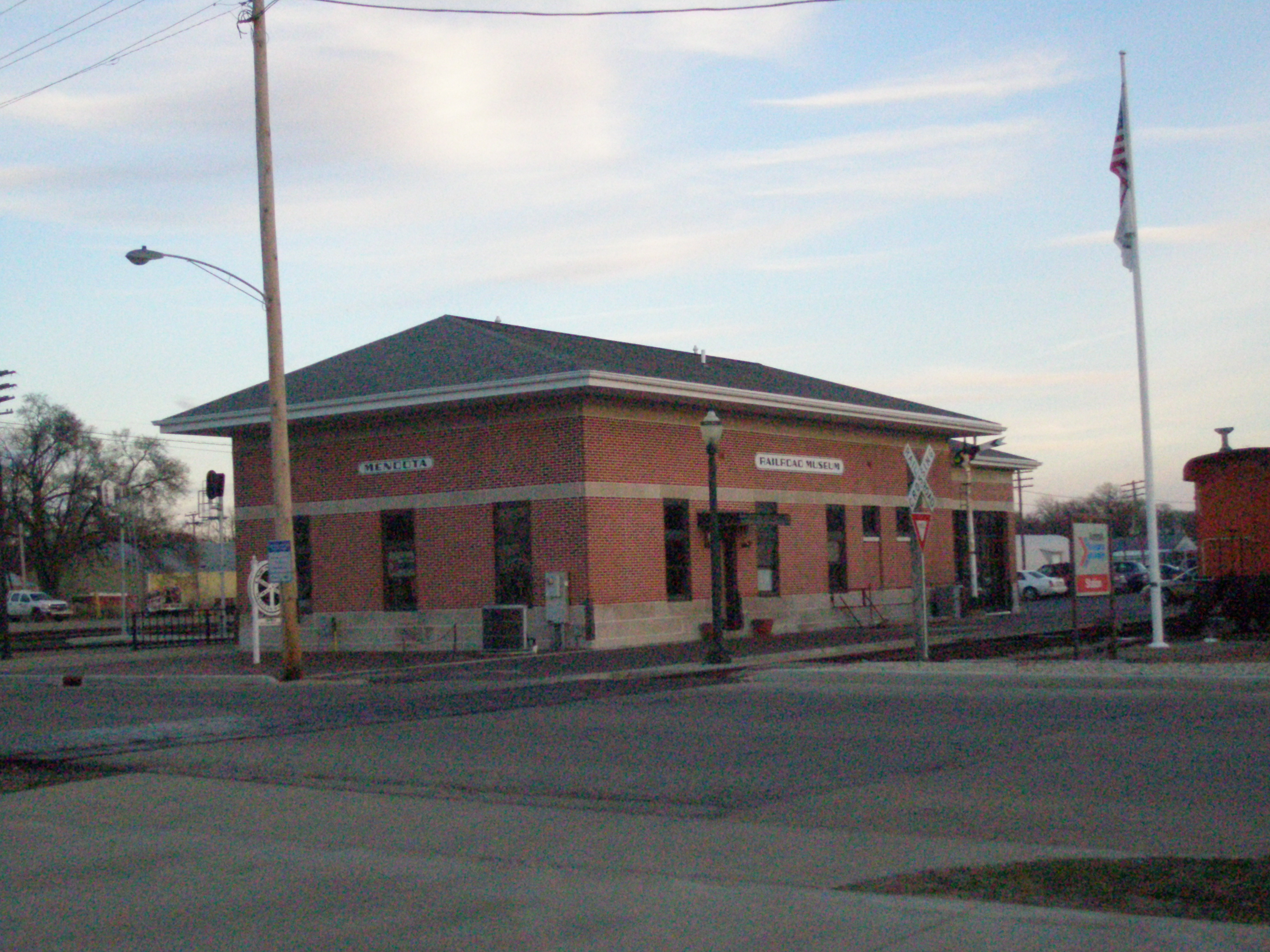
- The station building

General information
- Location: 8th Street and 6th Avenue; Mendota, Illinois
- Coordinates: 41.5498°N 89.1171°W
- Owner: Mendota Museum and Historical Society
- Line: BNSF Mendota Subdivision
- Platforms: 1 side platform
- Tracks: 2
- Connections: NCAT (dial-a-ride)

Other information
- Station code: Amtrak: MDT

History
- Opened: October 20, 1853
- Rebuilt: February 23, 1888

Passengers
- FY 2025: 18,178 (Amtrak)

Services
Preceding station	Amtrak	Following station
Princeton toward Quincy	Illinois Zephyr and Carl Sandburg	Plano toward Chicago
Princeton toward Los Angeles	Southwest Chief	Naperville toward Chicago
California Zephyr does not stop here
Former services
Preceding station	Burlington Route	Following station
Arlington toward Denver	Main Line	Meriden toward Chicago
Kewanee toward Oakland	California Zephyr	Aurora toward Chicago
Preceding station	Illinois Central Railroad	Following station
Sublette toward Freeport	Freeport – Centralia	Dimmick toward Centralia
Future services
Preceding station	Amtrak	Following station
Princeton toward Moline	Quad Cities Proposed	Plano toward Chicago
Location

Mendota station is an Amtrak intercity train station at 783 Main Street, Mendota, Illinois, United States.

The station was originally built on February 23, 1888, by the Chicago, Burlington and Quincy Railroad, as a replacement for the former Union Depot that was built in 1853 and burned down in 1885. It originally contained a hotel, restaurants and waiting rooms for passengers, and rooms for railroad employees. In 1942, much of the station was torn down, with little more than the waiting room and ticket office remaining intact.

Today the building is owned and preserved by the Mendota Museum and Historical Society as the Union Depot Railroad Museum. The station is a regular stop for the state-supported Illinois Zephyr and Carl Sandburg trains, and the long-distance Southwest Chief. The California Zephyr also uses these tracks, but does not stop in Mendota. BNSF Railway also has a small freight yard and office adjacent to the station. This yard is used to store trains and locomotives that do local runs along the Mendota Subdivision (which are usually pulled by four axle road switchers).

== Bibliography ==
- Hubbart, Gerald Wesley (1922). History of the Chicago, Burlington, and Quincy Railroad. Indiana University.
