= Galesburg Railroad Museum =

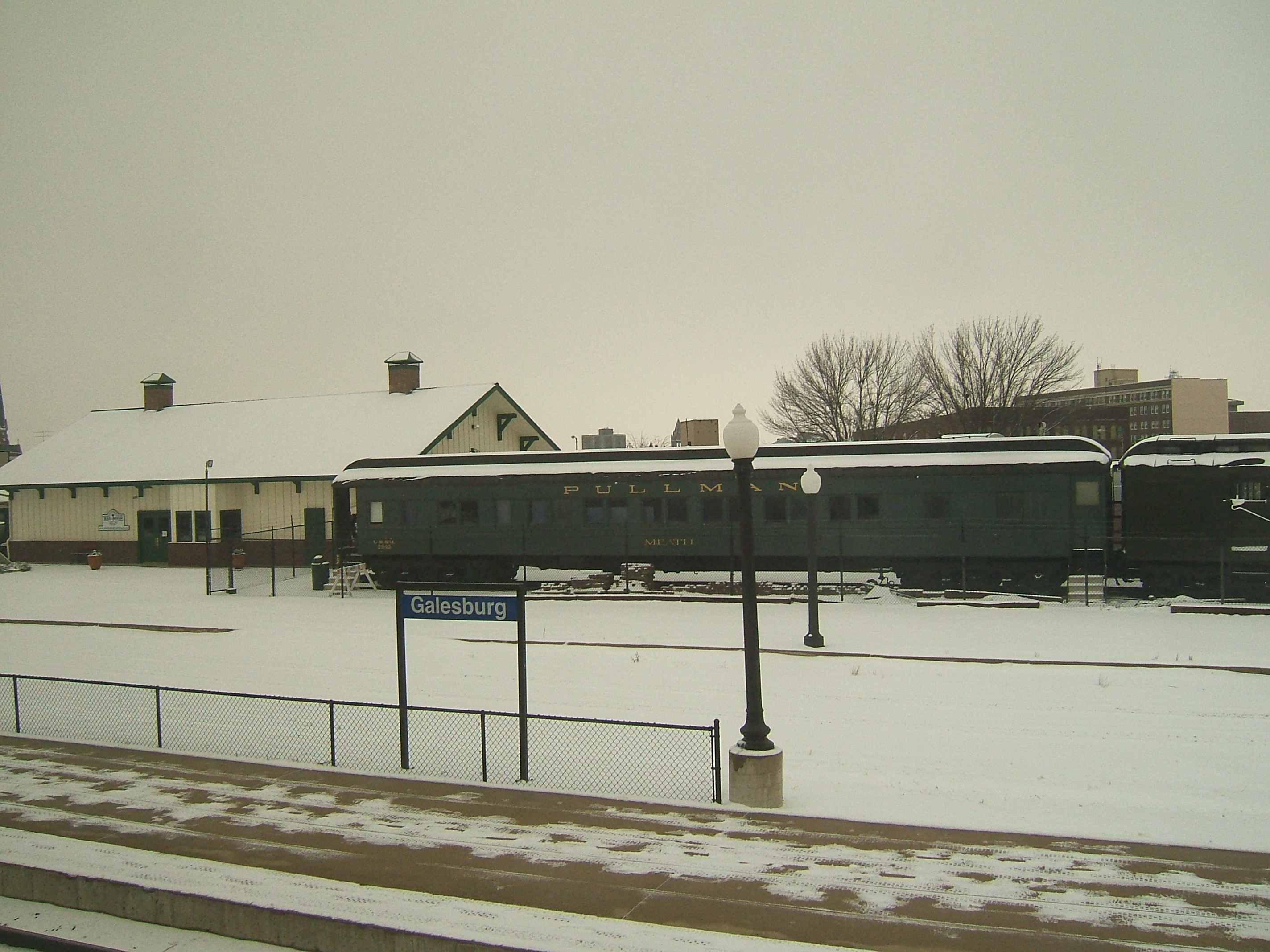
- The Pullman sleeping car viewed from an Amtrak train
- Established: 1982
- Location: 211 South Seminary Street; Galesburg, Illinois
- Coordinates: 40.9449°N 90.3637°W
- Type: Natural history
- Public transit access: Galesburg Transit
- Website: www.galesburgrailroadmuseum.org

The Galesburg Railroad Museum is a railroad museum in Galesburg, Illinois, United States. The museum is located at 211 South Seminary Street.

Its collection includes CB&Q 4-6-4 3006, a Pullman "Meath" car, Railway Express RPO Combination Mail & Baggage Car, CB&Q Burlington Route Way Car and a museum building housing a large collection of railroad history in pictures, on paper and items donated to the museum by railroad workers and their families.

Parking is available in the city parking lots on Seminary & Mulberry Streets.

== See also ==
- List of heritage railroads in the United States
- Galesburg (Amtrak station)
- The Galesburg Railroad Museum home page
- Galesburg Railroad Museum North Camera 1 live stream channel YouTube
