= Kewanee station =

Amtrak intercity train station in Kewanee, Illinois

Kewanee, IL
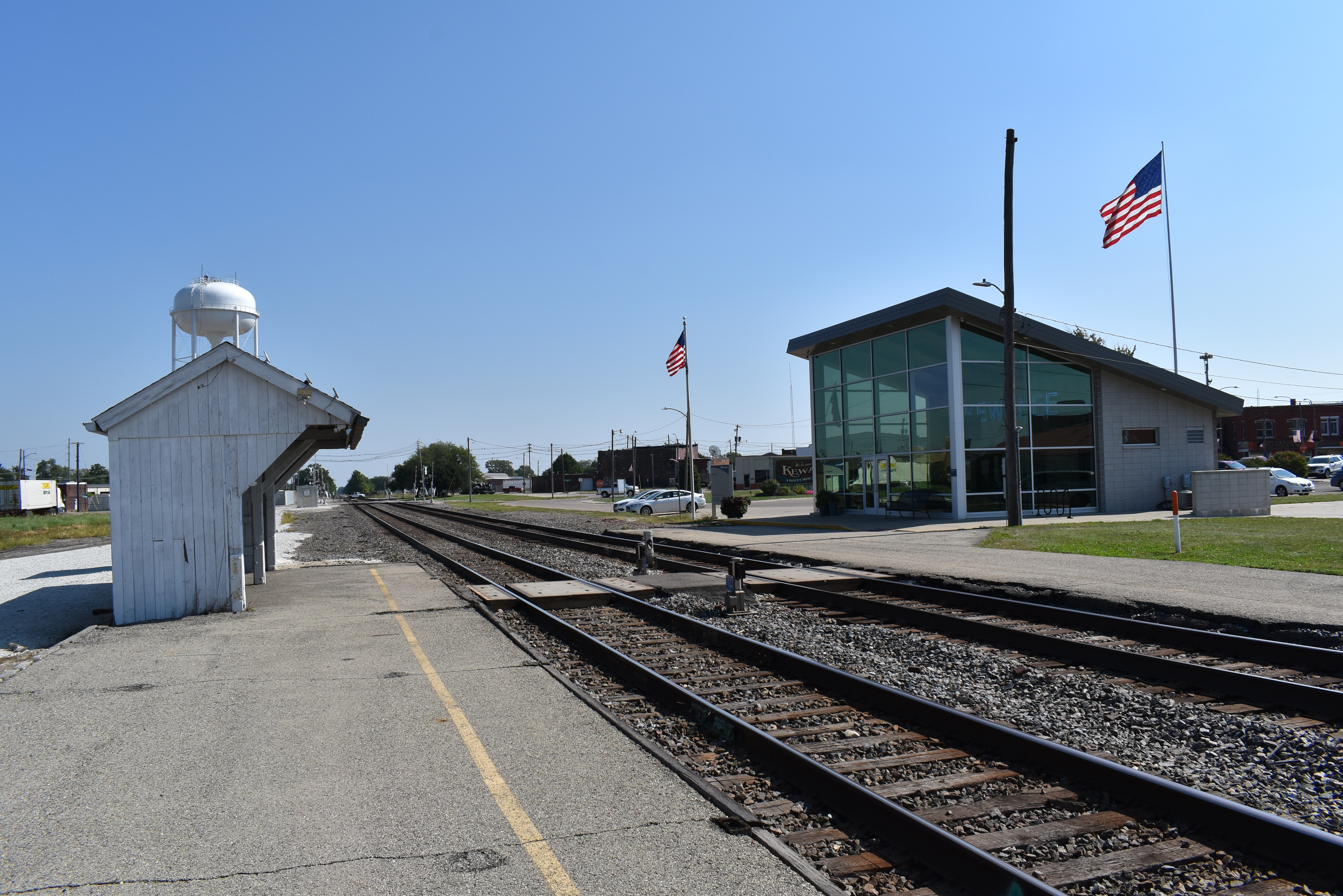
- Kewanee station in September 2021

General information
- Location: West Third and Loomis Streets; Kewanee, Illinois
- Coordinates: 41.2459°N 89.9278°W
- Line: BNSF Railway Mendota Subdivision
- Platforms: 2 side platforms
- Tracks: 2
- Connections: Henry County Public Transportation (dial-a-ride)

Other information
- Station code: Amtrak: KEE

History
- Opened: 1986
- Rebuilt: 2012

Passengers
- FY 2025: 13,172 (Amtrak)

Services
Preceding station	Amtrak	Following station
Galesburg toward Quincy	Illinois Zephyr and Carl Sandburg	Princeton toward Chicago
California Zephyr does not stop here
Southwest Chief does not stop here
Former services
Preceding station	Burlington Route	Following station
Galva toward Denver	Main Line	Neponset toward Chicago
Galesburg toward Oakland	California Zephyr	Mendota toward Chicago
Location

Kewanee station is an Amtrak intercity train station in Kewanee, Illinois. A new station opened on April 13, 2012, replacing a smaller brick structure built in 1986. In addition to the waiting room, the depot houses a regional office of the Henry County Tourism Bureau. The station is serviced by the Illinois Zephyr and Carl Sandburg. The California Zephyr and Southwest Chief also use these tracks but do not stop in Kewanee. Demolition of the historic Chicago, Burlington and Quincy Railroad (CB&Q) station occurred in 1985.

== New station ==
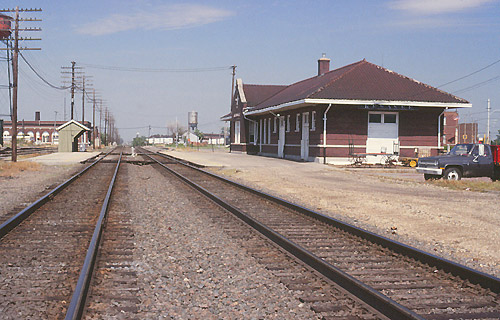
The now demolished CB&Q Depot seen on June 28, 1981.

Designed by the Peoria-based Farnsworth Group, the new $485,000 station has a sloping roof and great wall of glass. The primary decoration is a large neon sign, placed high on the waiting room wall, that spells out "KEWANEE." In 2009, town officials set aside $300,000 in capital funds for the project; additional funds came from the city's economic development fund. The city later applied for two state grants to help cover approximately half of the depot's cost. A total of $163,000 was gained through "Illinois Jobs Now!", a six-year, $31-billion statewide capital program supported by 20 year state bonds and federal and local matching funds. An additional $75,000 came through a state grant obtained by State Senator Darin LaHood and State Representative Don Moffitt. The new station opened in 2012.
