= Galesburg station =

Amtrak intercity train station in Galesburg, Illinois

Galesburg, IL
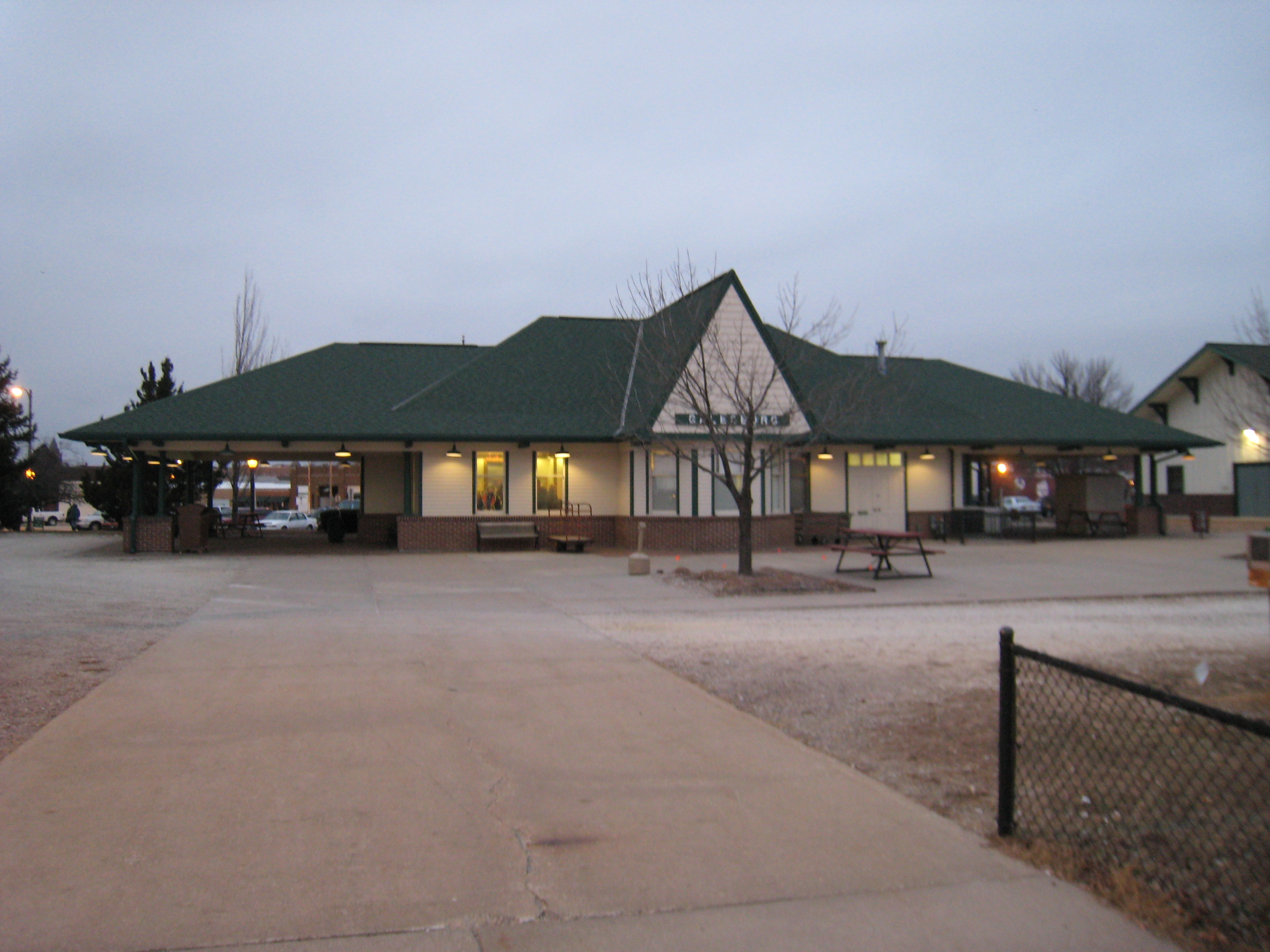
- The station house.

General information
- Location: 225 South Seminary Street, Galesburg, Illinois
- Coordinates: 40.9446°N 90.3640°W
- Owner: City of Galesburg
- Lines: BNSF Mendota Subdivision, Ottumwa Subdivision
- Platforms: 1 side platform, 1 island platform
- Tracks: 3
- Connections: Galesburg Transit; Burlington Trailways

Construction
- Parking: Yes
- Cycle facilities: Yes
- Accessible: Yes

Other information
- Station code: Amtrak: GBB

History
- Opened: December 7, 1854
- Rebuilt: –May 10, 1884; April 1912– –June 9, 1984

Key dates
- March 3, 1881: 1854 station depot burned
- April 27, 1911: 1884 station depot burned

Passengers
- FY 2025: 71,850 (Amtrak)

Services
Preceding station	Amtrak	Following station
Burlington toward Emeryville	California Zephyr	Princeton toward Chicago
Fort Madison toward Los Angeles	Southwest Chief	Princeton toward Chicago
Macomb toward Quincy	Illinois Zephyr and Carl Sandburg	Kewanee toward Chicago
Former services
Preceding station	Amtrak	Following station
Burlington toward Los Angeles	Desert Wind Discontinued in 1997	Princeton toward Chicago
Burlington toward Seattle	Pioneer Discontinued in 1997	Princeton toward Chicago
Monmouth toward Oakland-16th Street	San Francisco Zephyr	Kewanee toward Chicago
Preceding station	Burlington Route	Following station
Cameron toward Denver	Main Line	Wataga toward Chicago
Burlington toward Oakland	California Zephyr	Kewanee toward Chicago
Abingdon toward Kansas City	Kansas City – Galesburg	Terminus
Terminus	Galesburg – Peoria	Knoxville toward Peoria
Terminus	Galesburg – Rushville	Henderson toward Rushville
Knoxville toward St. Louis	St. Louis – Savanna	Bouhan toward Savanna
Location

Galesburg is an Amtrak intercity train station in Galesburg, Illinois, United States. The station was originally built in 1984, after the razing of the large depot just south of the current site. It is located north of the large BNSF Railway classification yard. Just south the Illinois Zephyr and Carl Sandburg diverge via the Quincy main line which bypasses the yard on the east side. The California Zephyr and the Southwest Chief continue to the southwest side of Galesburg near Knox College.

There are three tracks with one island platform and one side platform. Trains to California normally arrive on the track closest to the depot, known as track one. Trains between Quincy and Chicago arrive on track two and platform on the island platform as trains divert from the main line just south of the station and eventually on to the Brookfield Subdivision. In the early 2010s, the island platform received a yellow tactile warning strip that complies with the Americans with Disabilities Act. The project was funded by the American Recovery and Reinvestment Act of 2009 at an estimated cost of $75,000. The side platform already had a tactile warning strip.

It is the main area for Galesburg Railroad Days when it runs during the last weekend of June as bus tours of the rail yards originate from here. A GE Evolution Series locomotive is also put on a side track for visitors to look at. The Galesburg Railroad Museum is next to the property.

== History ==
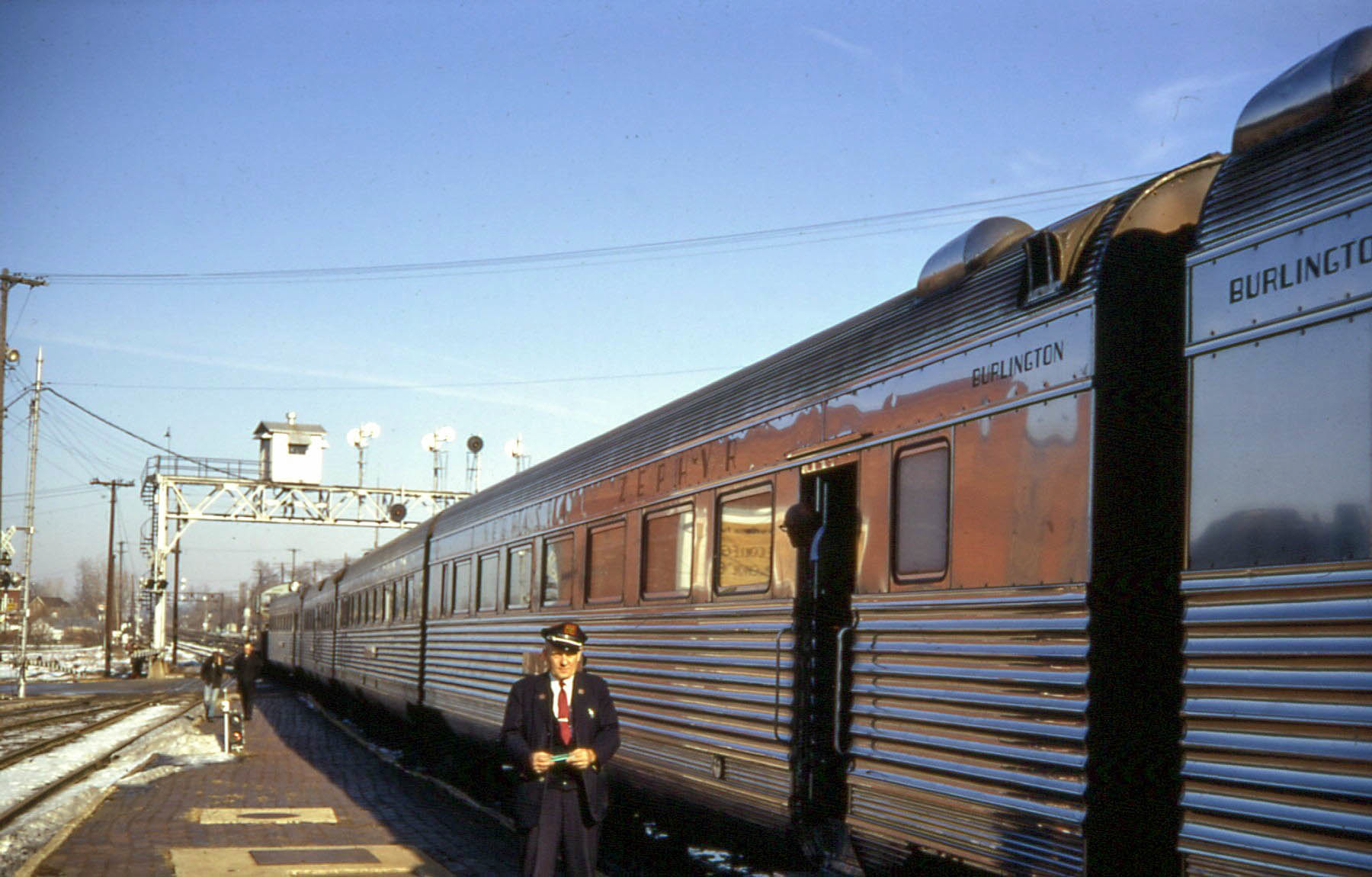
The Nebraska Zephyr stopping at the depot in 1968

The Chicago, Burlington & Quincy Railroad was established in 1849 to rival the Galena & Chicago Union Railroad. Five years later, in 1854, the CB&Q reached Galesburg and a depot was constructed in the "Five Points" area, near Knox College. The wooden building had two stories, with offices on the second floor, and was connected to a hotel. In 1858, Stephen A. Douglas traveled through this station on his way to debate future president Abraham Lincoln. On March 3, 1881, the depot fell victim to a fire.

1884 saw the construction of a new CB&Q depot on Seminary Street in Galesburg. The station, unlike the station at Five Points, was made of red brick. The structure was two stories tall, and included a clock tower in the center, with a steam locomotive weather-vane. It also had several platforms and tracks. Soon after the completion of the new depot, the Atchison, Topeka and Santa Fe Railway arrived in Galesburg and a Santa Fe depot was built just blocks away from the CB&Q depot, a depot, which, by the mid-20th century, would see such notable trains as the Super Chief and El Capitan. Ironically, despite being built of brick, unlike its predecessor, it wound up falling victim to a similar fate almost exactly 30 years later. On May 27, 1911, a fire began in the attic of the building and the structure burned to the ground.

Work began on a third structure soon after, and the building opened the following year. The third depot was 16,000 square feet, of reddish-brown brick and white limestone trim. Extra buildings would be added for freight and restaurants at each end of the main station house. Beginning in the mid-1930s, the CB&Q introduced their famous Zephyr trains this depot became a station on several of the trains, including the Nebraska Zephyr, Ak-Sar-Ben Zephyr and Denver Zephyr. It was also a station on the Exposition Flyer, operated jointly between the CB&Q, Denver & Rio Grande Western and Western Pacific railroads between Chicago and Oakland, a train which would later be replaced by the famed California Zephyr. The depot eventually would serve Burlington Northern trains between 1970 and 1971 and later Amtrak trains post 1971. By the early 1980s, however, Burlington Northern officials began to question the necessity and practicality of having such a large depot in the face of declining passenger service. Following a study that stated that it would cost $1.5 million to renovate the building, the building was demolished overnight on May 13, 1983.

In 1984, a one-story Amtrak station was built with funding split by the passenger railroad and the Illinois Department of Transportation.

== Connections ==
- Burlington Trailways (Indianapolis, IN—Burlington, IA)
- Galesburg Transit: Route 2 (Green)

== Gallery ==
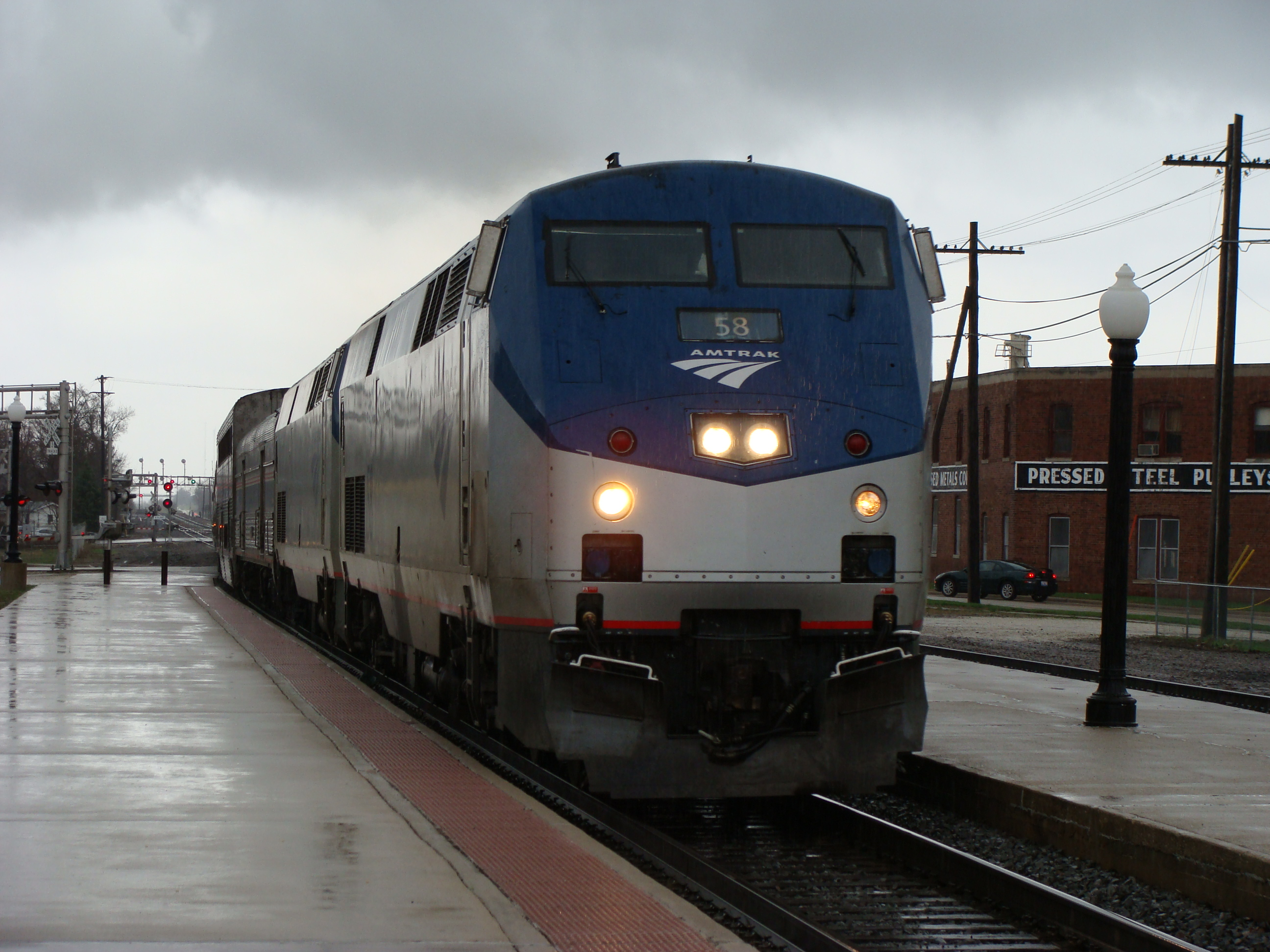
Amtrak #5, the westbound California Zephyr arriving on track 1

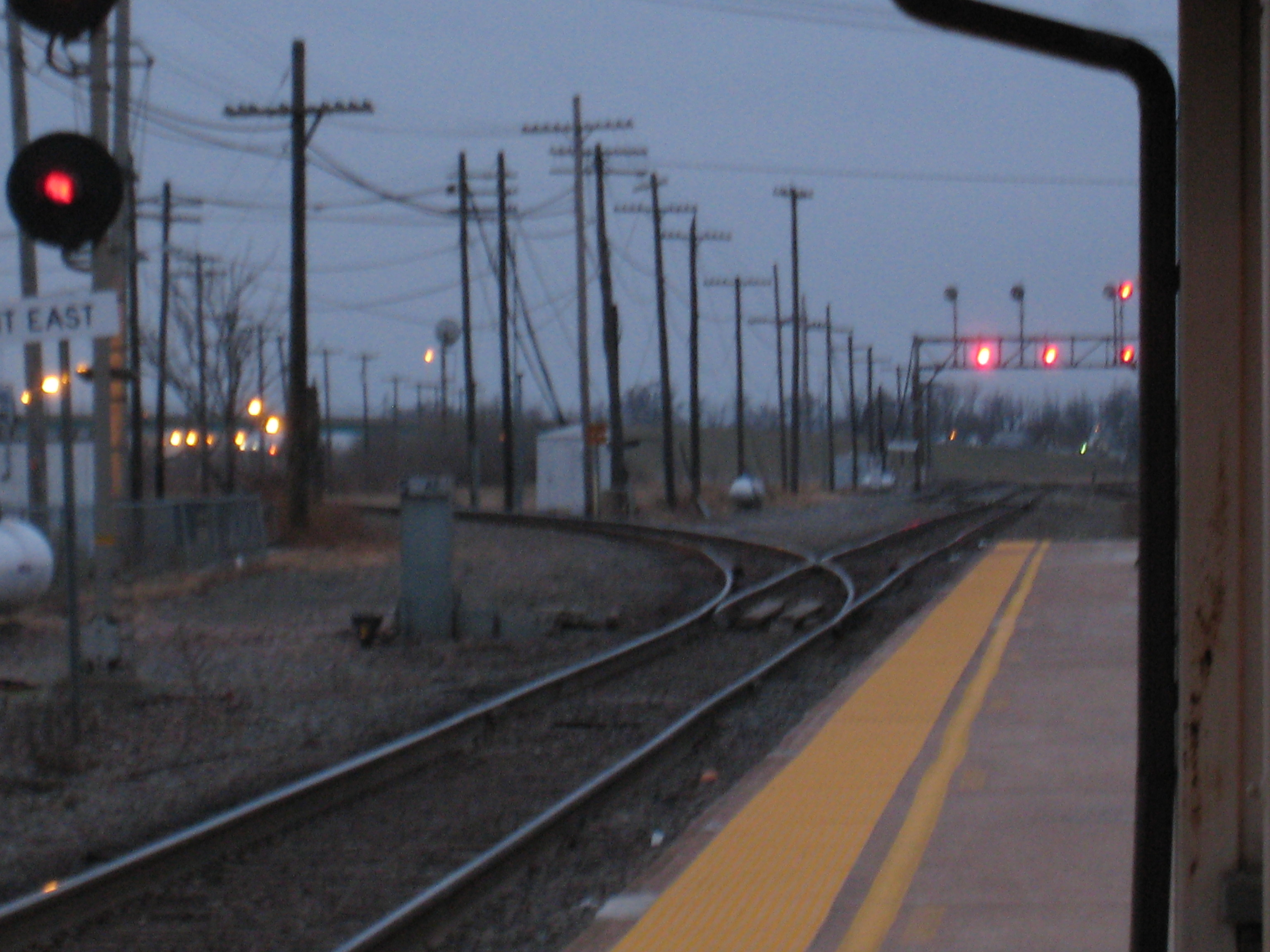
View down former CB&Q tracks towards Quincy. Trains to Quincy divert from the main line at this point.

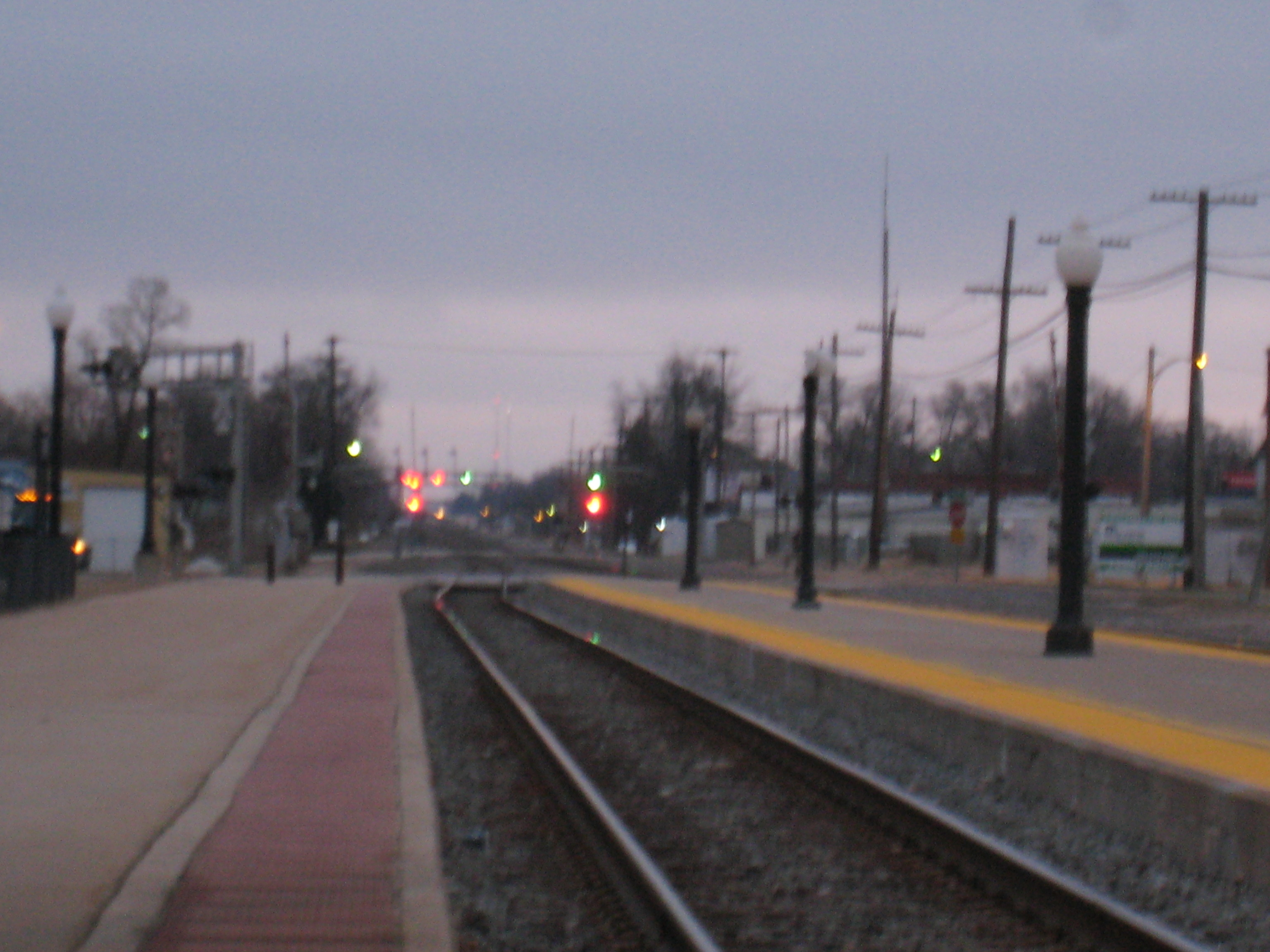
View down the tracks towards Chicago

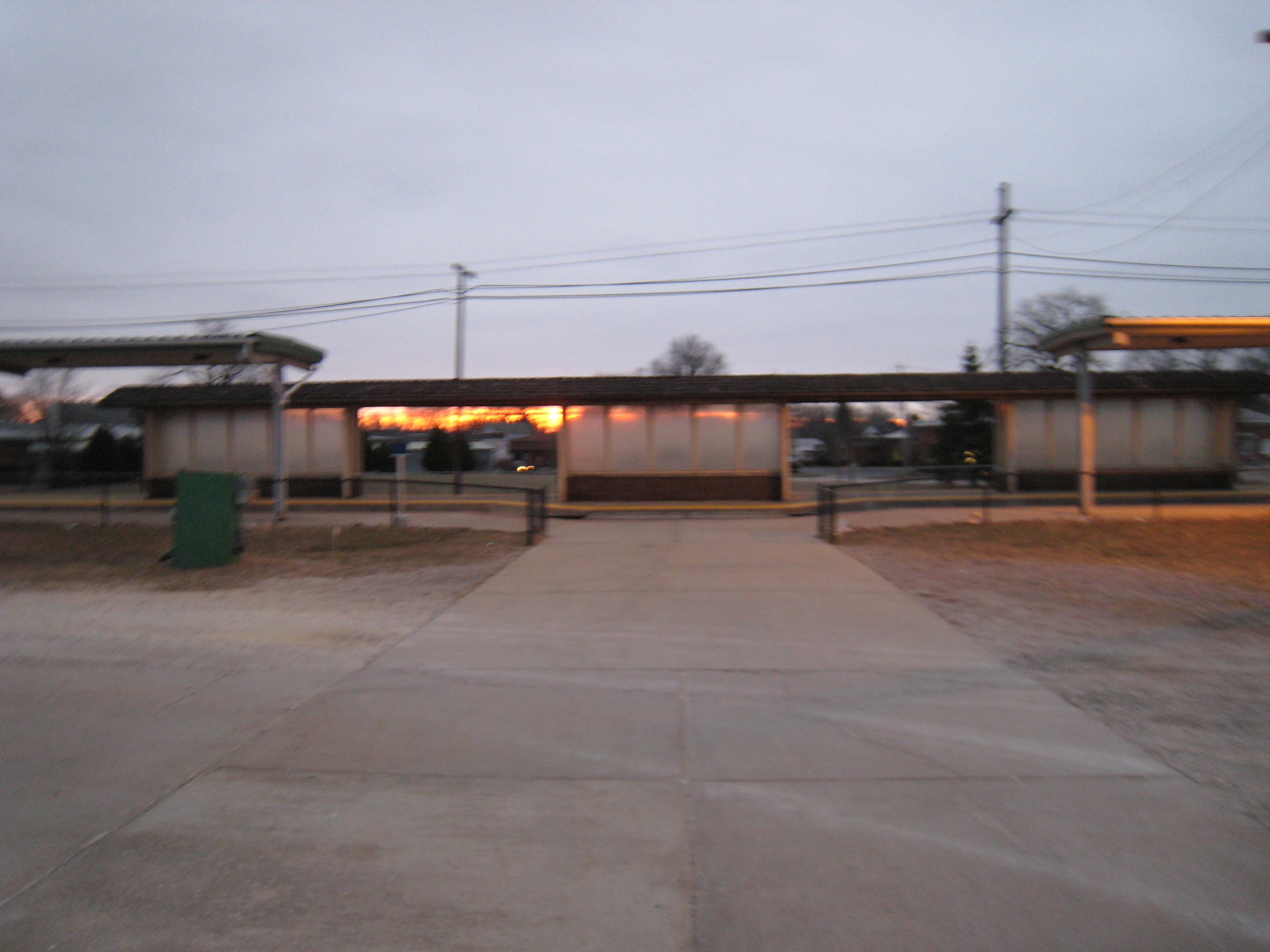
View of the platforms from the station house

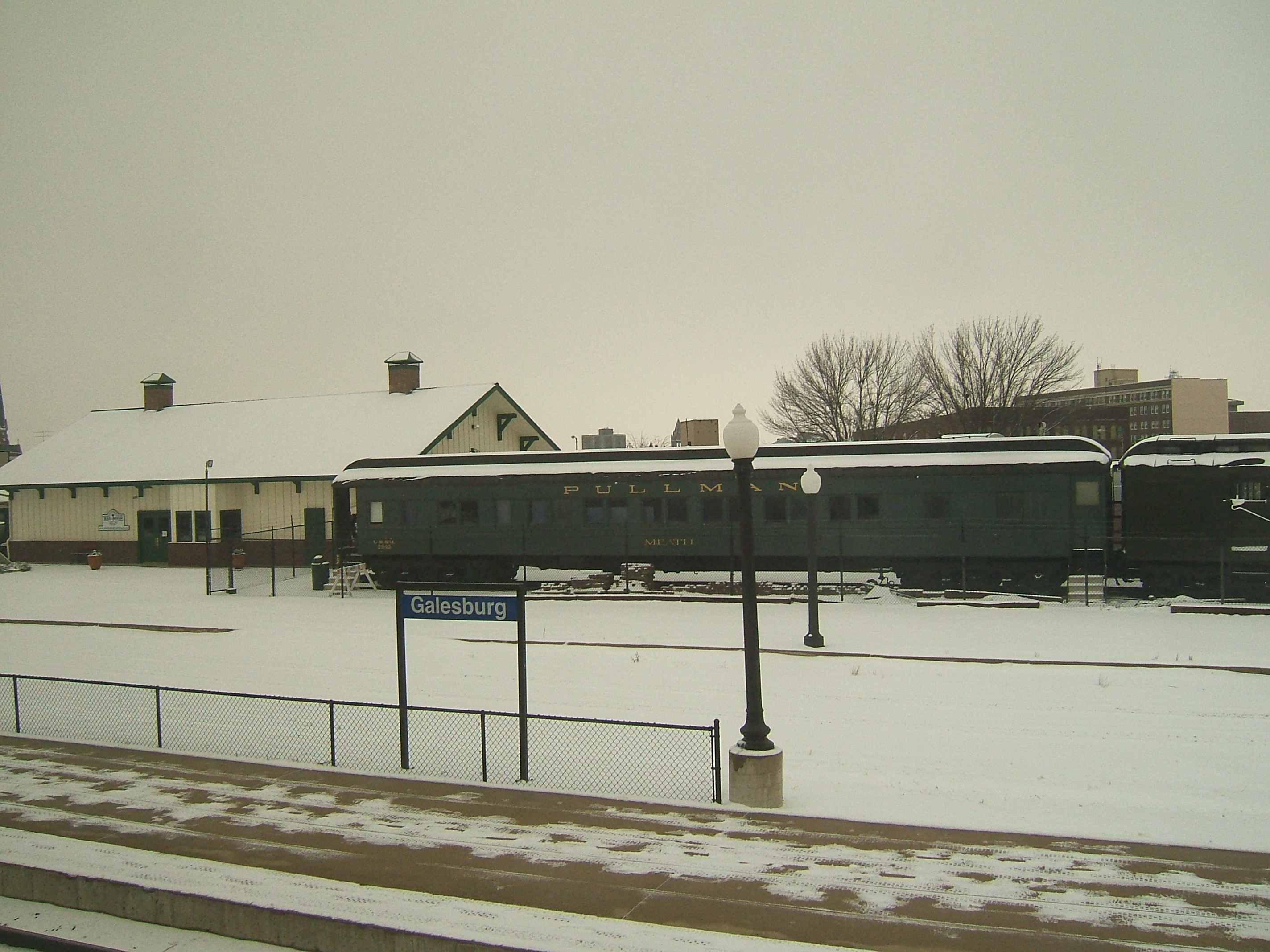
A Pullman sleeping car at the Galesburg Railroad Museum
