= Princeton station (Illinois) =

Train station in Princeton, Illinois

Princeton, IL
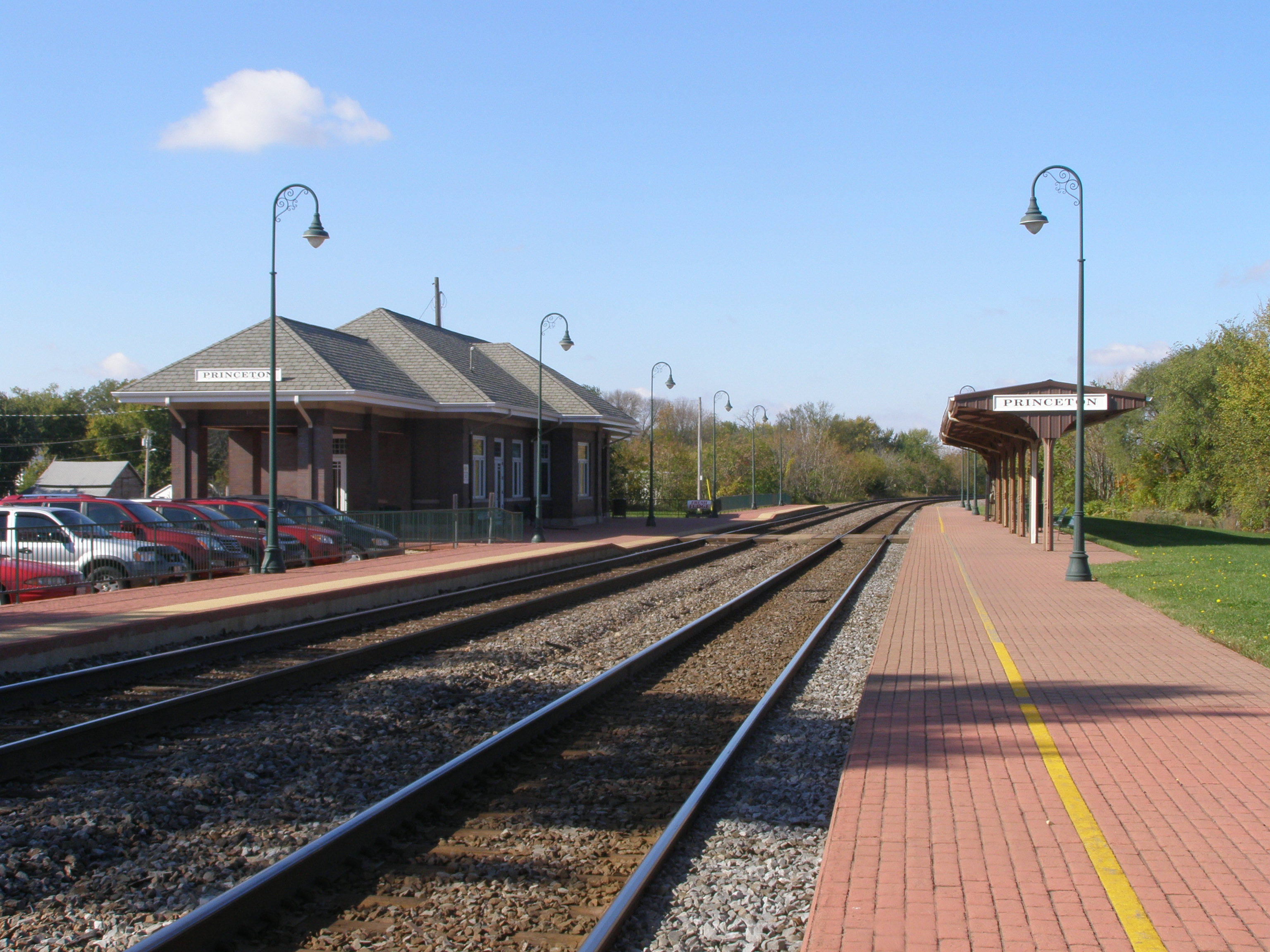
- Princeton station in October 2011

General information
- Location: 107 Bicentennial Drive; Princeton, Illinois
- Coordinates: 41.3852°N 89.4669°W
- Owner: BNSF Railway
- Line: BNSF Mendota Subdivision
- Platforms: 2 side platforms
- Tracks: 2
- Connections: BPART (dial-a-ride)

Other information
- Station code: Amtrak: PCT

History
- Opened: 1911
- Rebuilt: 1998

Passengers
- FY 2025: 29,018 (Amtrak)

Services
Preceding station	Amtrak	Following station
Galesburg toward Emeryville	California Zephyr	Naperville toward Chicago
Kewanee toward Quincy	Illinois Zephyr and Carl Sandburg	Mendota toward Chicago
Galesburg toward Los Angeles	Southwest Chief	Mendota toward Chicago
Former services
Preceding station	Amtrak	Following station
Galesburg toward Los Angeles	Desert Wind Discontinued in 1997	Naperville toward Chicago
Galesburg toward Seattle	Pioneer Discontinued in 1997	Naperville toward Chicago
Preceding station	Burlington Route	Following station
Wyanet toward Denver	Main Line	Zearing toward Chicago
Future services
Preceding station	Amtrak	Following station
Geneseo toward Moline	Quad Cities Proposed	Mendota toward Chicago
Location

Princeton station is an Amtrak intercity train station at 107 Bicentennial Drive in Princeton, Illinois. The station was built in 1911 by the Chicago, Burlington and Quincy Railroad and is listed as "Princeton City" on the Amtrak website and the List of Amtrak stations. Amtrak, the Illinois Department of Transportation and the city worked together to renovate the depot in 1998. Over the following six years, a new roof and gutters were installed, brickwork was repaired and the restrooms were upgraded.

The station is adjacent to Darius Miller Park, which was named in honor of Darius Miller, president of the Chicago, Burlington and Quincy Railroad (CB&Q) from 1910 to 1914; officials from the CB&Q donated the land for the park following Miller's death.
