= Naperville station =

Railroad station in Naperville, Illinois

Naperville, IL
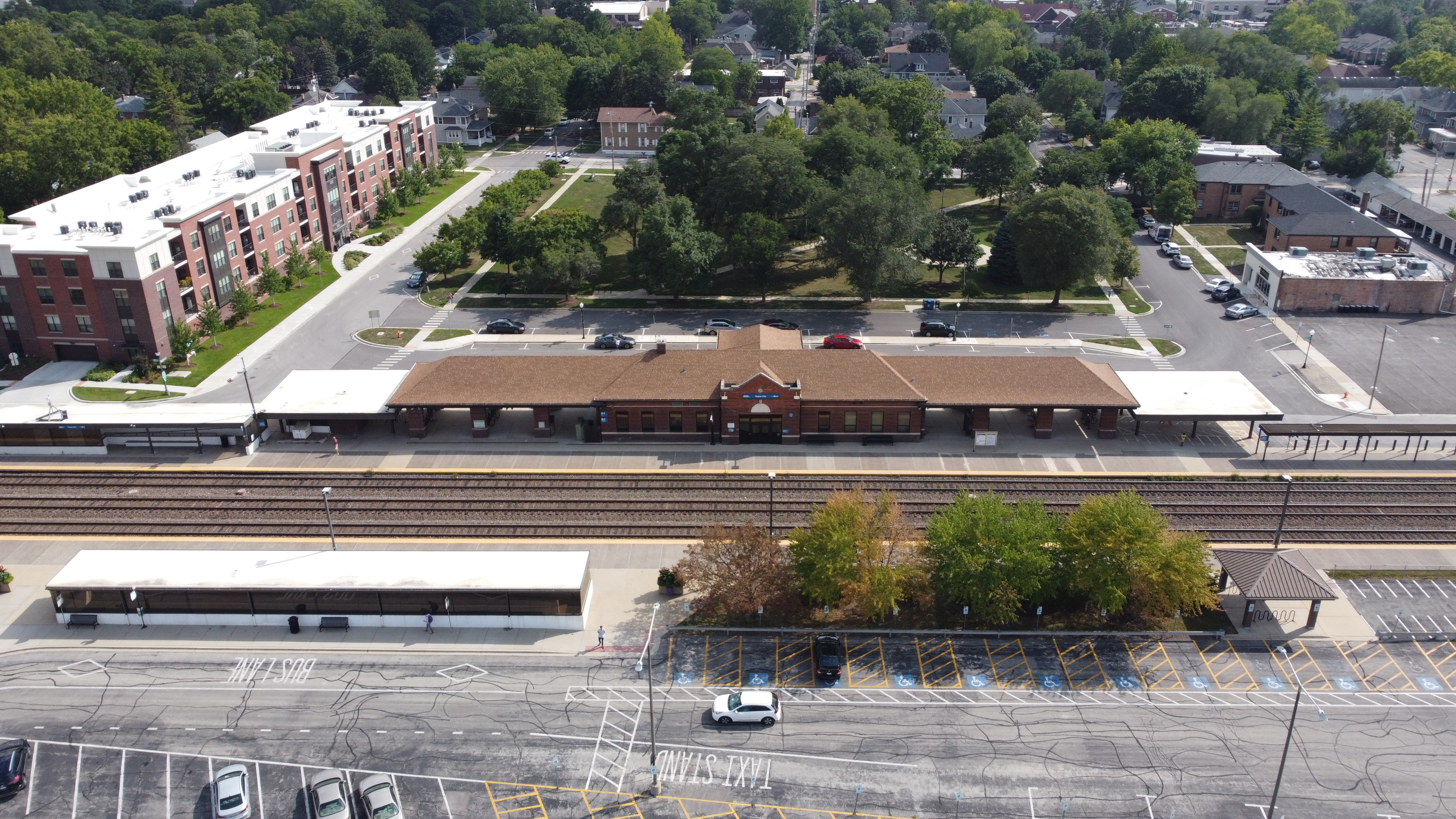
- Bird's-eye view of Naperville station

General information
- Location: 105 East Fourth Avenue; Naperville, Illinois; United States
- Coordinates: 41.7796°N 88.1455°W
- Owner: City of Naperville
- Line: BNSF Chicago Subdivision
- Platforms: 2 side platforms (1 island platform demolished)
- Tracks: 3
- Connections: Pace

Construction
- Accessible: Yes

Other information
- Station code: Amtrak: NPV
- Fare zone: 4 (Metra)

History
- Opened: 1910

Passengers
- FY 2025: 34,737 annually (Amtrak)
- October 2025: 2,290 (average weekday) (Metra)
- Rank: 2 out of 236 (Metra)

Services
Preceding station	Amtrak	Following station
Princeton toward Emeryville	California Zephyr	Chicago Terminus
Mendota toward Los Angeles	Southwest Chief	Chicago Terminus
Plano toward Quincy	Illinois Zephyr and Carl Sandburg	La Grange toward Chicago
Preceding station	Metra	Following station
Route 59 toward Aurora	BNSF	Lisle toward Union Station
Former services
Preceding station	Amtrak	Following station
Princeton toward Los Angeles	Desert Wind Discontinued in 1997	Chicago Terminus
Aurora closed 1983 toward Los Angeles	Desert Wind Discontinued in 1997	Chicago Terminus
Princeton toward Seattle	Pioneer	Chicago Terminus
Preceding station	Burlington Route	Following station
Eola toward Aurora	Suburban Service	Lisle toward Chicago
Eola toward Minneapolis	Minneapolis – Chicago	Lisle toward Chicago
Future services
Preceding station	Amtrak	Following station
Plano toward Moline	Quad Cities Proposed	La Grange Road toward Chicago
Track layout
Location

Naperville is a train station in Naperville, Illinois, served by Amtrak, the national railroad passenger system. Amtrak trains stopping at the Naperville station include the California Zephyr, Illinois Zephyr, Carl Sandburg, and Southwest Chief. It is also one of two stations in Naperville that serves Metra's BNSF commuter line, and an abundance of Pace bus routes. Naperville station was originally built in 1910 by the Chicago, Burlington and Quincy Railroad. On April 25, 1946, the station was the site of a collision between the CB&Q's Exposition Flyer and Advance Flyer. On April 26, 2014, a memorial entitled Tragedy to Triumph was dedicated at the train station. The sculpture by Paul Kuhn is dedicated not only to the crash victims but also to the rescuers at the site.

As of October 2025, Naperville has an average of 2,290 weekday boardings for Metra trains. This makes the station the second busiest of Metra's 236 non-downtown stations, after Route 59 station. The station served about 27,000 Amtrak passengers in 2022.

As of September 8, 2025, Naperville is served by 70 Metra trains (32 inbound, 38 outbound) on weekdays, and by all 40 trains (20 in each direction) on weekends and holidays. On weekdays, three Metra trains terminate at Naperville.

== Bus connections ==
Pace

- 530 West Galena–Naperville Metra Station
- 714 College of DuPage–Naperville–Wheaton Connector
- 722 Ogden Avenue
