= Quad Cities (train) =

Planned intercity passenger train to operate between Chicago and Moline, Illinois

Overview
- Service type: Inter-city rail
- Status: Planned
- Locale: Illinois
- First service: TBD
- Current operator: Amtrak

Route
- Termini: Chicago, Illinois; Moline, Illinois
- Stops: 8
- Distance travelled: 162 miles (261 km)
- Service frequency: Twice-daily

Technical
- Track gauge: 4 ft 8 1/2 in (1,435 mm)
- Track owners: BNSF, IAIS

The Quad Cities is a planned Amtrak Illinois Service intercity passenger train that will operate between Chicago and Moline in the US state of Illinois. The train will duplicate the route and stations of the Illinois Zephyr and Carl Sandburg between Chicago and Wyanet using track owned by BNSF. On the Wyanet–Moline segment, which will include a station at Geneseo, the train will use track owned by Iowa Interstate Railroad.

== History ==
Originally, the Rock Island Railroad provided passenger service in the Quad Cities via the Quad Cities Rocket train. The railroad initially declined to hand passenger operations over to Amtrak, and service to Chicago continued until December 31, 1978.

In 2008, United States Senators Tom Harkin and Chuck Grassley of Iowa and Dick Durbin and Barack Obama of Illinois sent a letter to Amtrak asking them to begin plans to bring rail service to the Quad Cities. In October 2010, a $230 million federal fund was announced that will bring Amtrak service to the Quad Cities, with a new line running from Moline to Chicago. They had hoped to have the line completed in 2015, and to offer two daily round trips to Chicago. In December 2011, the federal government awarded $177 million in funding for the Amtrak connection.

In 2015, Illinois Republican governor Bruce Rauner announced a spending freeze that placed both the proposed train service and the Black Hawk to Dubuque, Iowa, under review by the Illinois Department of Transportation (IDOT). After being on hold for over a year, IDOT moved forward with the project in order to prevent losing the $177 million in federal funding for the passenger service.

In July 2019, a new transportation bill was passed by the Illinois state legislature, supported by Governor J.B. Pritzker, with $225 million was appropriated to begin this service. In its 2020–2025 service plan, Amtrak forecast that the Chicago–Moline route will begin in fiscal year 2024 and attract 165,600 riders that year.

In February 2023, State Senator Mike Halpin, State Representative Gregg Johnson, and Moline Mayor Sangeetha Rayapati asked IDOT and Amtrak to request intervention from the Surface Transportation Board against the Iowa Interstate Railroad for holding up the project.

In December 2023, the Federal Railroad Administration accepted an application by IDOT to enter the Chicago–Moline route into its Corridor Identification and Development Program. The program grants $500,000 toward service planning and prioritizes the route for future federal funding.

Passage of Illinois Senate Bill 2111 Illinois People Over Parking Act in late 2025 appropriated the remaining funds required for the project. A new connection between BNSF and Iowa Interstate Railway trackage at Wyanet, IL will be required and negotiations with the Iowa Interstate Railway to upgrade to positive train control on their 53 mile portion of the route are not yet finalized.

In June 2026, Senators Dick Durbin and Tammy Duckworth, alongside Representative Eric Sorensen, called on the FRA to extend the deadline for using federal funds on the Quad Cities route. They also mentioned how after years of negotiations, IDOT and the Iowa Interstate Railroad were on board with the project.

That September, Illinois secured federal funds for the project, allowing it to continue. Although it would take "a few more years" for the project to open, due to the need to repair infrastructure and finalize agreements with the freight railroads, it now has the needed funding. Current plans call for two round trips a day from Chicago to the Quad Cities, with the possibility of adding further round trips if demand warrants it, as well as possible extensions to Iowa City, Des Moines, and Omaha.

== Stations ==
The entire route is in Illinois.

Town/City	Station	Connections
Chicago	Chicago Union Station	Amtrak: Blue Water, Borealis, California Zephyr, Cardinal, City of New Orleans, Empire Builder, Floridian, Hiawatha, Illini and Saluki, Illinois Zephyr and Carl Sandburg, Lake Shore Limited, Lincoln Service, Pere Marquette, Southwest Chief, Texas Eagle, Wolverine; CTA Buses; Amtrak Thruway, Megabus; Metra: North Central Service, Milwaukee District North Line, Milwaukee District West Line, BNSF Line, Heritage Corridor, SouthWest Service
La Grange	La Grange	Amtrak: Illinois Zephyr and Carl Sandburg; Metra: BNSF Line; Pace
Naperville	Naperville	Amtrak: California Zephyr, Illinois Zephyr and Carl Sandburg, Southwest Chief; Metra: BNSF Line; Pace
Plano	Plano	Amtrak: Illinois Zephyr and Carl Sandburg
Mendota	Mendota	Amtrak: Illinois Zephyr and Carl Sandburg, Southwest Chief
Princeton	Princeton	Amtrak: California Zephyr, Illinois Zephyr and Carl Sandburg, Southwest Chief
Geneseo	Geneseo	
Moline	Moline	Amtrak Thruway, Burlington Trailways, Greyhound Lines; Quad Cities MetroLINK
