= Tucumcari station =

Former train station in Tucumcari, New Mexico

Tucumcari
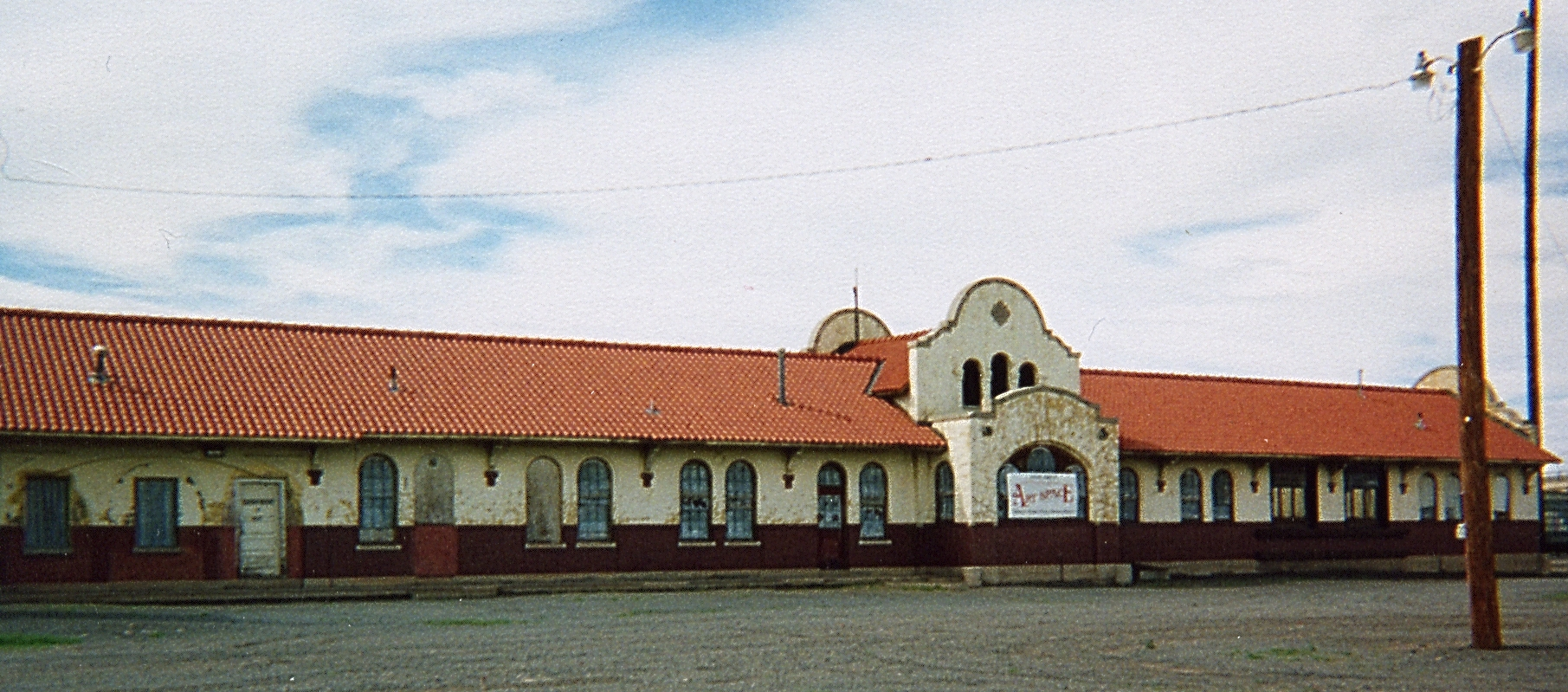
- Former Union Station, now Tucumcari Railroad Museum, July 2008.

General information
- Location: 100 West Railroad Street; Tucumcari, New Mexico, 88401
- Coordinates: 35.18053°N 103.72653°W
- System: Former Rock Island Line and Southern Pacific passenger rail station
- Owner: Tucumcari Railroad Museum
- Lines: Chicago, Rock Island and Pacific Railroad, Southern Pacific Railroad
- Platforms: 2 (formerly)
- Tracks: 2 (formerly)

History
- Opened: 1901
- Closed: 1968
- Rebuilt: 1926

Former services
| Preceding station | Chicago, Rock Island and Pacific Railroad | Following station |
|---|---|---|
| Terminus | Tucumcari – Memphis | San Jon toward Memphis |
| Terminus | Tucumcari – Rock Island | Logan toward Rock Island |
| Preceding station | Southern Pacific Railroad | Following station |
| Montoya toward El Paso | Golden State Route | Terminus |
Location

Tucumcari Union Station is a train station in Tucumcari, New Mexico, United States. The current station building was erected in 1926. Today, the Tucumcari Railroad Museum occupies the station building. It formerly served the Chicago, Rock Island and Pacific Railroad and the Southern Pacific Transportation Company as a division point and transfer stop on the joined transcontinental services until these trains were discontinued in 1968.

== History ==
Originally, Tucumcari was a construction camp on the Chicago, Rock Island and Pacific Railroad when the line was being built in 1901, called Ragtown. Before Tucumcari was created, the Golden State Limited and other trains ran through the area. Around the time when the town was formed on the line, it was named "Six Shooter Siding" due to many gunfights happening at the camp. The town and station was formally called Douglas until the name changed to Tucumcari in 1908.

== Current station building ==
In 1926, the Rock Island constructed a new Mission Revival station that still stands today to meet the demands of the passenger ridership growth as well as the city growing. It had a ticket counter, station agent, and baggage area along with a waiting room.

== Trains that stopped at the station ==
- Arizona Limited
- Californian
- Cherokee
- Golden State
- Golden Rocket (cancelled)
- Imperial

== Decline and current operations ==
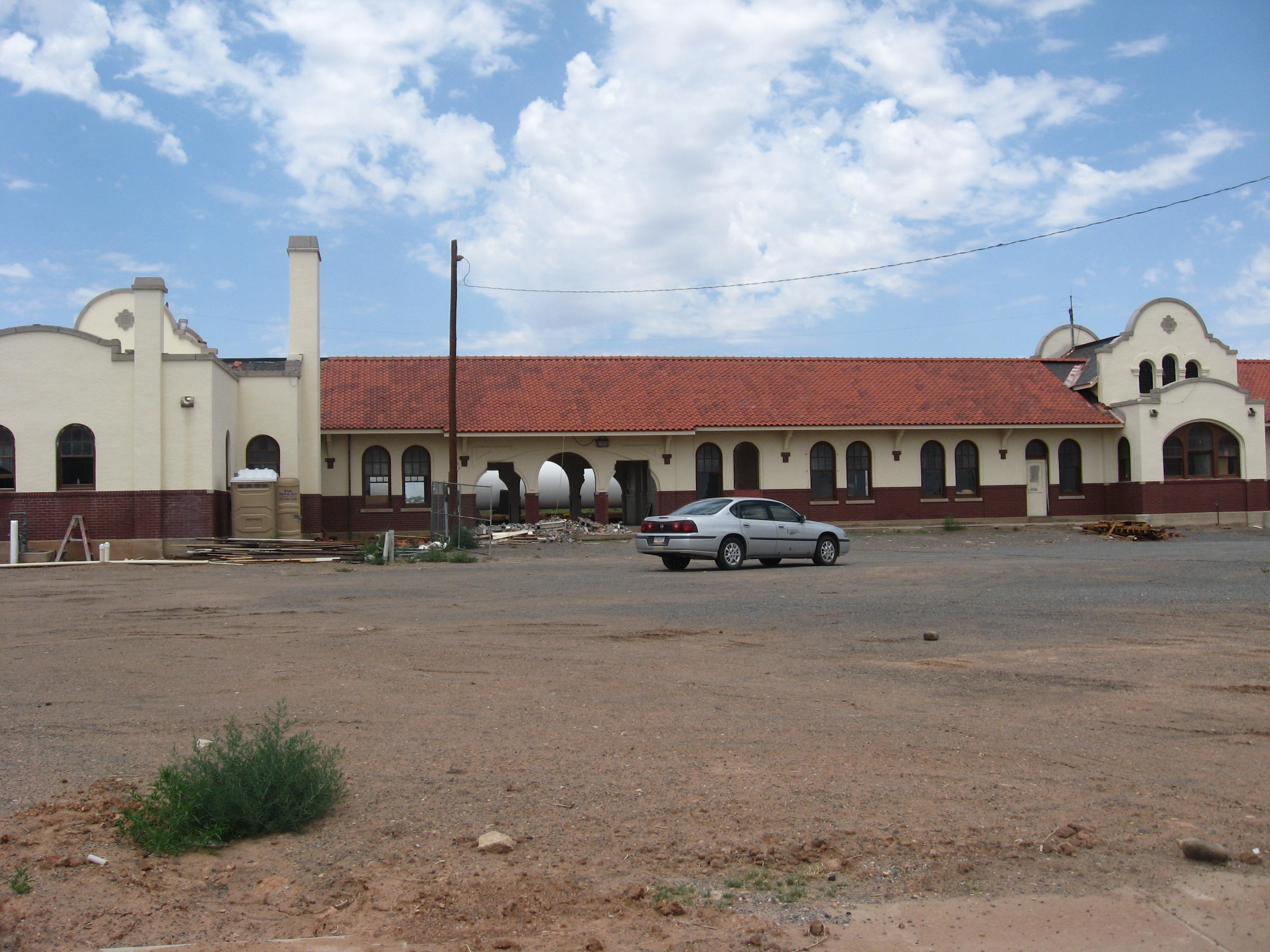
The station while under restoration on July 28, 2011.

Starting in the 1950s and 1960s, the number of passengers going through the station declined as with the popularity of rail transport due to the car and airlines. This affected the Rock Island heavily and the number of trains going through the station went down. In 1967, the Imperial, which has stopped at the station along with the Cherokee, were discontinued. This meant the only train serving the station was the Golden State, which was discontinued a year later and ending passenger service to Tucumcari. After the passenger trains left, it was still used by the railroads as a yard office and division point office. However, in 1980, the Rock Island was broken up due to bankruptcy and the Southern Pacific gained full responsibility of the station building. The station building deteriorated slowly during the 1980s.

In 1996, the Southern Pacific was acquired by the Union Pacific Railroad, which donated the building to the city of Tucumcari in 2002. Restoration work on the station began and was completed in 2015, and the Tucumcari Railroad Museum now occupies the station building.

== In Film ==
In the classic 1965 Sergio Leone western, For A Few Dollars More, the film opens with Mortimer (Lee Van Cleef), a bounty hunter, riding a train and pulling the emergency brake (cord) to force it to stop at the Tucumcari station.
