= Galesburg Transit =

Provider of mass transportation in Knox County, Illinois

- Founded: 1972
- Locale: Galesburg, Illinois
- Service area: Knox County, Illinois
- Service type: Bus service, paratransit
- Routes: 4
- Fleet: 4 buses
- Website: Galesburg Transit

Galesburg Transit is the primary provider of mass transportation in Knox County, Illinois with routes serving the Galesburg area. As of 2019, the system provided 160,712 rides over 23,487 annual vehicle revenue hours with 4 buses and 8 demand response vehicles.

== History ==
Public transit in Galesburg began in 1867 with horsecars operated by the Galesburg Horse Railway Company. The horsecars were replaced with electric streetcars in 1892, run by the Galesburg Electric Motor & Power Company. The Illinois Traction Company began operations in 1915 and introduced the first buses in 1926. The last streetcar ran in 1931. Private bus companies continued operating the transit system in Galesburg until 1972, when the city of Galesburg took over operations.

== Service ==
Galesburg Transit operates on a pulse system with Routes 1, 2 and 3 departing the Prairie and Main transfer hub at on the hour, with Route 4 departing at 15 and 45 past the hour. Hours of operation for regular routes are Monday through Saturday from 7:00 A.M. to 6:15 P.M. There is no Sunday service.

Connections to intercity public transit are available via Route 2 (Green) at Galesburg station. There, passengers may transfer to Amtrak trains and Burlington Trailways buses.

As of 2022, fares are set at $0.60 for adults, $0.40 for students and free for children, seniors and local college students and staff at Carl Sandburg College and Knox College. Fares for Carl Sandburg College students and faculty have been free since 2017, with yearly service contracts covering the cost of service.

== Transfer points ==
- Prairie and Main — Route #1 (Blue); Route #2 (Green), Route #3 (Red), and Route #4 (Gold) - serves as the primary transfer hub in downtown.
- Target — Route #2 (Green), Route #3 (Red) and Route #4 (Gold)
- Walmart — Route #1 (Blue) and Route #4 (Gold)

== Fixed Route Ridership ==
The ridership statistics shown here are of fixed route services only and do not include demand response.

== See also ==
- List of bus transit systems in the United States
- Go West Transit
