= Mound City station =

Former railway station in Missouri, U.S.

Mound City
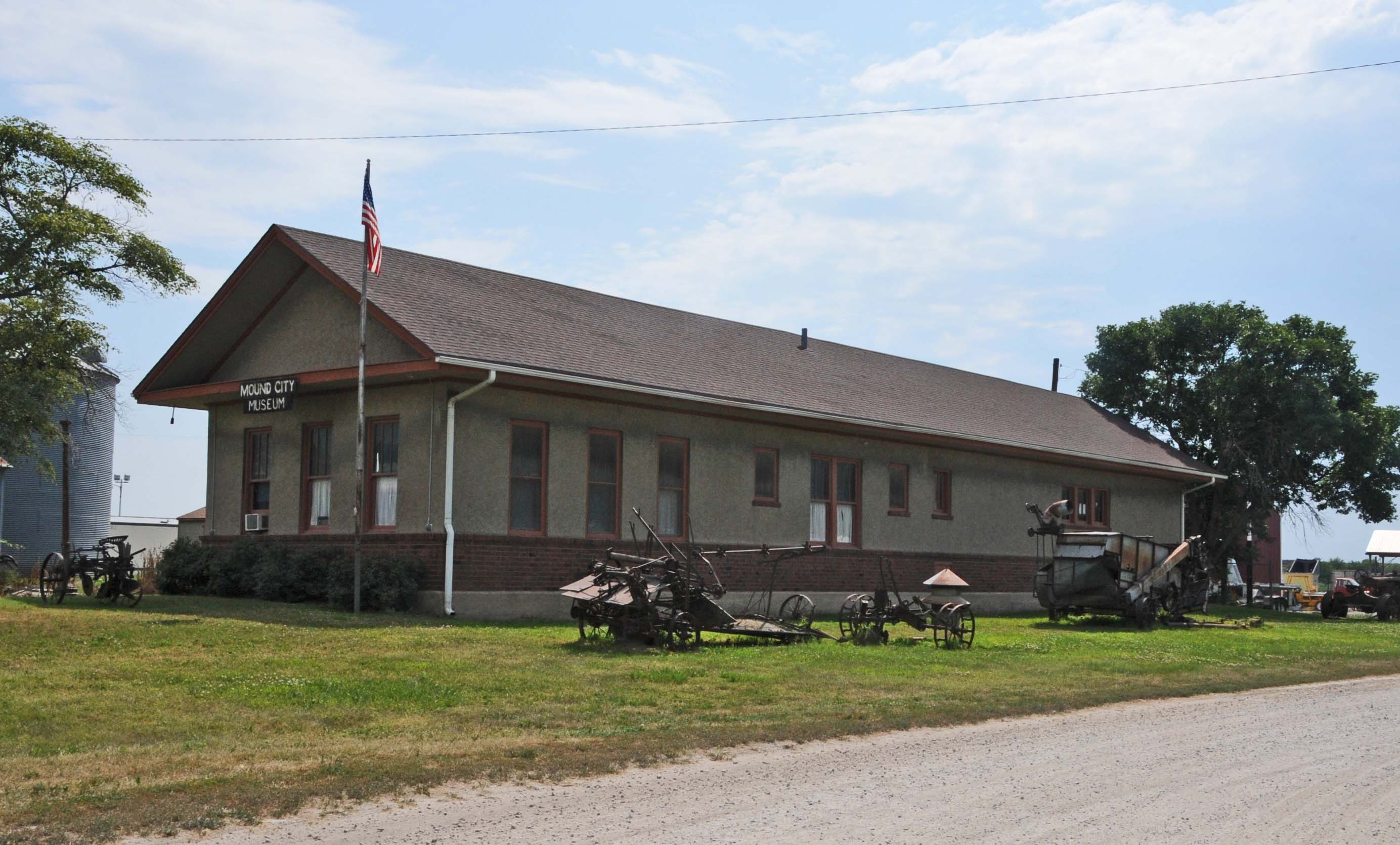
- Chicago, Burlington and Quincy Depot, July 2013

General information
- Location: 239 State Street, Mound City, Missouri 64470
- System: Former Burlington Route passenger station
- Platforms: 1

History
- Rebuilt: 1921

Services
Preceding station	Burlington Route	Following station
Bigelow Terminus	Bigelow – Clearmont	Maitland toward Clearmont
- Chicago, Burlington and Quincy Depot
- U.S. National Register of Historic Places
- Location within Missouri Location within the United States
- Location: S. State St., Mound City, Missouri
- Coordinates: 40°7′43″N 95°13′52″W
- Area: 0.3 acres (0.12 ha)
- Built: 1921
- Built by: C.B. & Q.
- NRHP reference No.: 78001648
- Added to NRHP: December 12, 1978
Location

Mound City station, also known as the Mound City Museum, is a historic train station located at Mound City, Holt County, Missouri. It was built in 1921 by the Chicago, Burlington and Quincy Railroad, and is a simple one-story, hollow tile and red brick building measuring 100 feet by 25 feet. It sits on a concrete foundation and has a gable roof. It houses a local history museum.

It was listed on the National Register of Historic Places in 1978 as the Chicago, Burlington and Quincy Depot.
