= Iowa Interstate Railroad =

United States railroad subsidiary company

Overview
- Headquarters: Cedar Rapids, Iowa
- Reporting mark: IAIS
- Locale: Illinois, Iowa, Nebraska
- Dates of operation: 1984–present
- Predecessor: Chicago, Rock Island & Pacific Railroad

Technical
- Track gauge: 4 ft 8 1/2 in (1,435 mm) standard gauge
- Length: 580 miles (930 km)

Other
- Website: iaisrr.com

The Iowa Interstate Railroad (reporting mark IAIS) is a Class II regional railroad operating in the central United States. The railroad is owned by Railroad Development Corporation of Pittsburgh, Pennsylvania.

== History ==
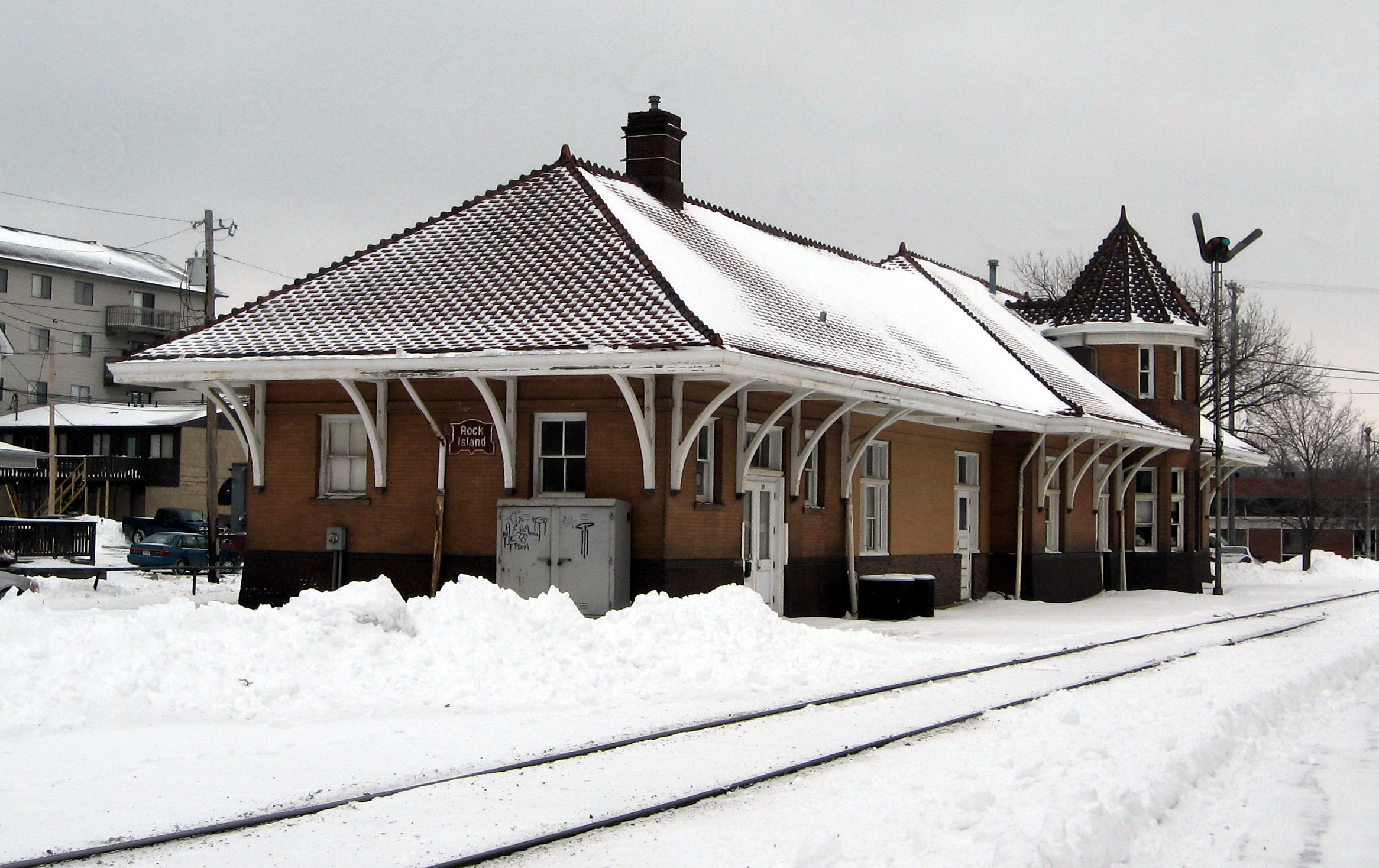
Iowa City Depot, once part of the Chicago, Rock Island & Pacific Railroad, now on IAIS line.

The railroad was formed on November 2, 1984, using former Chicago, Rock Island & Pacific Railroad tracks between Chicago, Illinois, and Omaha, Nebraska, four years after the Rock Island folded. It was in partnership with real estate firm Heartland Rail Corporation that the IAIS was able to operate. Heartland purchased the right-of-way and infrastructure for $31 million (of which, $15 million was a loan from the Iowa Railway Finance Authority), and then leased it to IAIS for operations.

The IAIS and the railroad infrastructure were purchased from Heartland by Railroad Development Company of Pittsburgh, Pennsylvania, in 2003.

In recognition of the railroad's Rock Island Railroad heritage, the IAIS logo uses a shape similar to the original railroad's logo and has also painted two of its General Electric ES44AC locomotives (513 and 516) in Rock Island inspired paint schemes.

== Operations ==
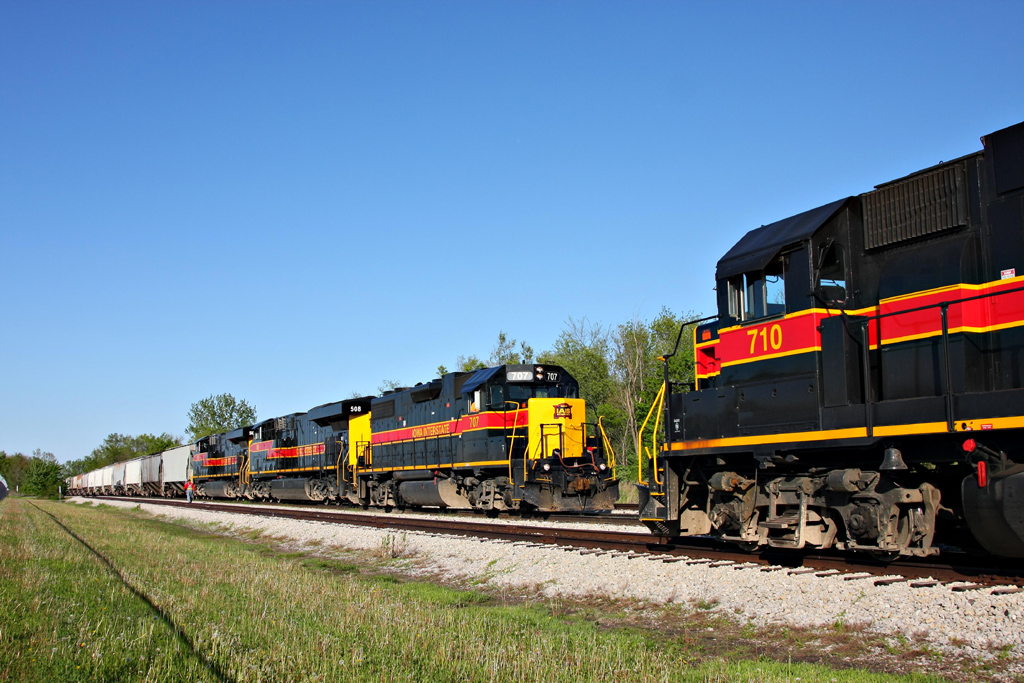
Two trains meet near Altoona, Iowa. At left, train 707 is led by an EMD GP38-2. At right, train 710 is also led by a GP38-2.

The company operates over 580 miles of track. The railroad's mainline is roughly a straight line between Council Bluffs, Iowa, and Chicago, Illinois, with a branch line connecting Bureau to Peoria, Illinois. The mainline is separated into 4 Subdivisions:

- Council Bluffs Subdivision (Council Bluffs to Des Moines, Iowa)
- Newton Subdivision (East Des Moines to South Amana, Iowa)
- Iowa City Subdivision (South Amana to Silvis, Illinois)
- Blue Island Subdivision (Silvis to Bureau Junction, Illinois)

The railroad also includes the:

- Peoria Subdivision (Bureau Junction to Peoria, Illinois)
- Cedar Rapids Subdivision (South Amana to Cedar Rapids, Iowa). This line is owned by the Cedar Rapids and Iowa City Railroad, but dispatched and operated by the Iowa Interstate.

The Iowa Interstate operates from Bureau to Chicago over the former Rock Island tracks controlled by CSX and Metra. In Chicago the IAIS owns two yard facilities, Burr Oak Yard and Evans Yard (the site of former rail car builder Evans), both in Blue Island, Illinois.

Trains are dispatched from the company's HQ in Cedar Rapids, Iowa, where a new dispatching office was completed in 2016. IAIS uses Wabtec's Train Management and Dispatching System (TMDS), the same dispatching software used by several Class I railroads, including the BNSF and KCS. When the IAIS took control of the track, the former Rock Island signal system was already damaged beyond repair due to sitting dormant for several years. Operations on the railroad are primarily controlled by track warrants rather than signals as a result.

The Iowa Interstate is unique in that it is the only Class II railroad in the US that has connections to every Class I railroad, affording its customers a reach not offered by other regional railroads.

The railroad also maintains two intermodal operations at either end of its line in Chicago and Council Bluffs. The operation in Council Bluffs is also used by the Union Pacific, with IAIS crews interchanging with UP several times a day.

IAIS subsidiary Rail Traffic Control formerly provided consulting services for dispatching and operating small- to medium-sized railroads worldwide.

In 2004, IAIS was awarded the E. H. Harriman Award for its safe operational record.

== Amtrak ==
Beginning in the mid-1990s, the IAIS mainline has been identified as a potential route for high speed passenger train service between Wyanet, Illinois (where the IAIS could be connected to the BNSF Railway), the Quad Cities and Iowa City, as part of the Midwest Regional Rail Initiative (MRRI). The ultimate goal of the MRRI is to establish passenger train routes in a hub-and-spoke formation with Chicago as the hub that allows for speeds up to and above 110 mph (177 km/h).

In July 2019, a new transportation bill was passed by the Illinois state legislature, supported by Governor J.B. Pritzker, $225M was appropriated to begin Amtrak service from Chicago to Moline, IL. A rail connector (junction) will be built between BNSF and IAIS to permit the Quad Cities service to use BNSF mainline from Wyanet to Chicago Union Station. This Amtrak route will use the IAIS main line between Wyanet and Moline, IL. Upgrades to IAIS rail crossings, track, and signaling for Amtrak's 79-mph requirements will be performed.

== Motive power ==
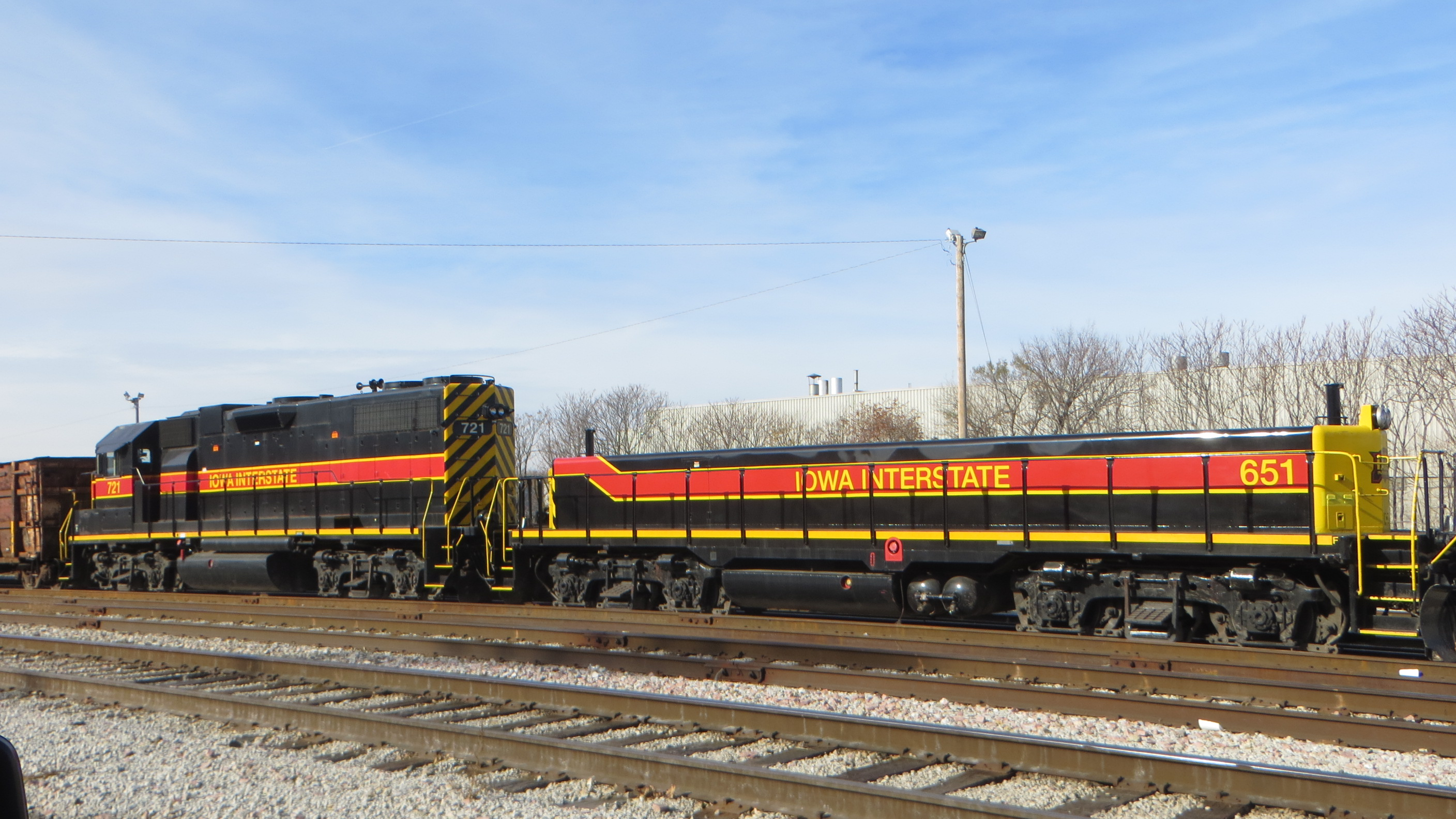
Slug #651 coupled to GP38-2 #721

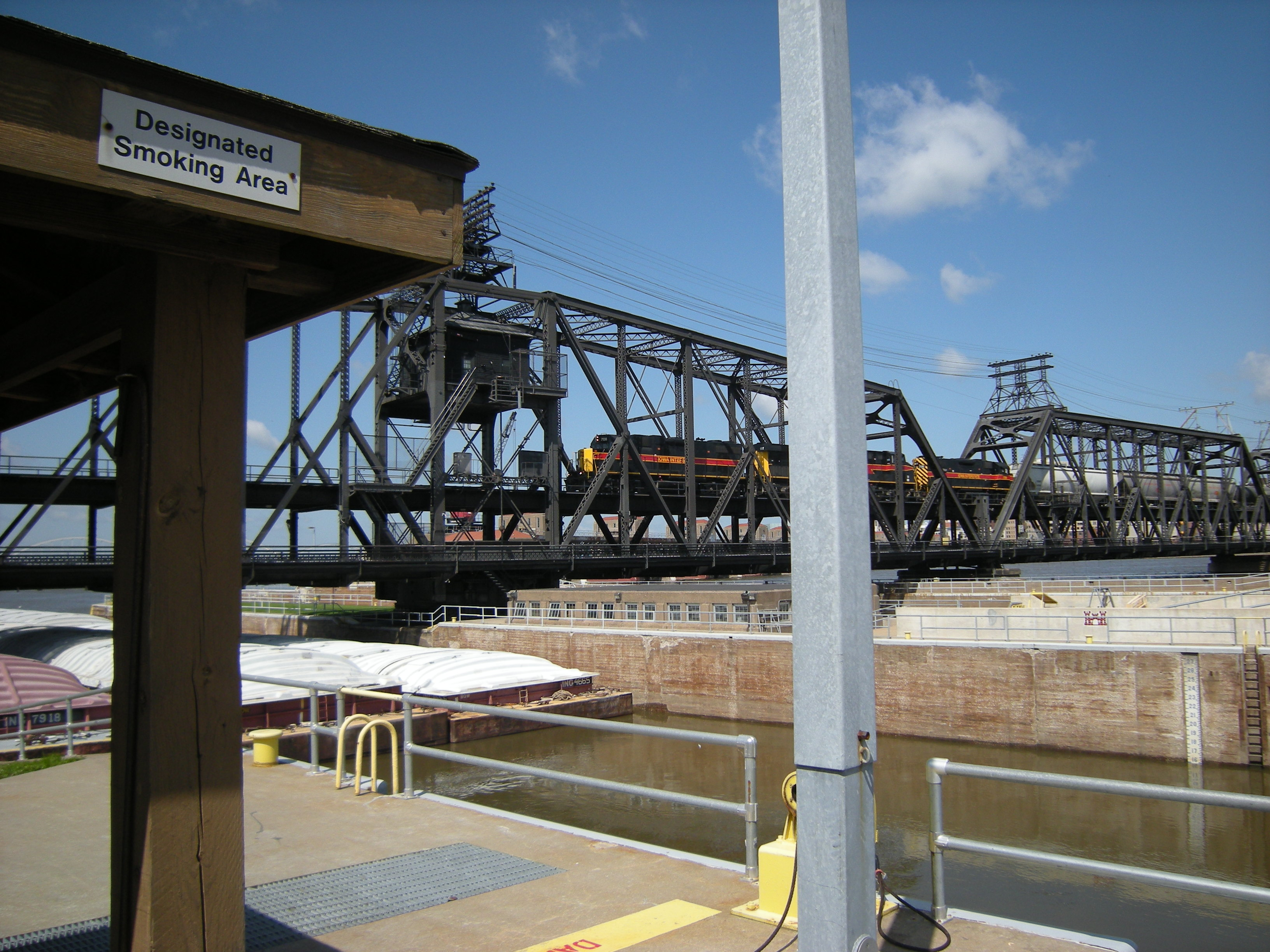
IAIS #708 crossing the Government Bridge at the Mississippi River, southbound from Davenport, Iowa into Rock Island, Illinois

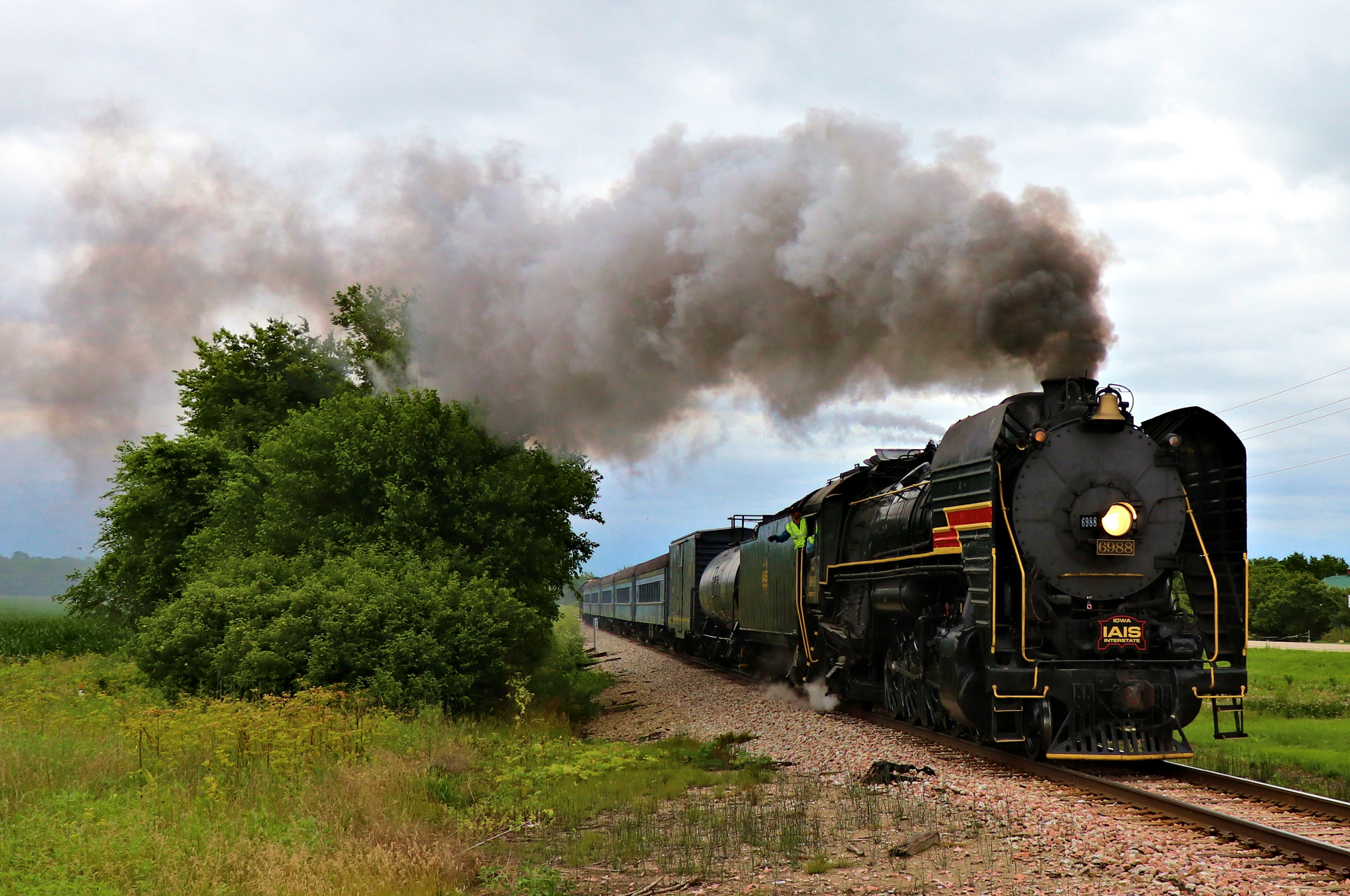
IAIS #6988 hauling an excursion train through West Des Moines, Iowa

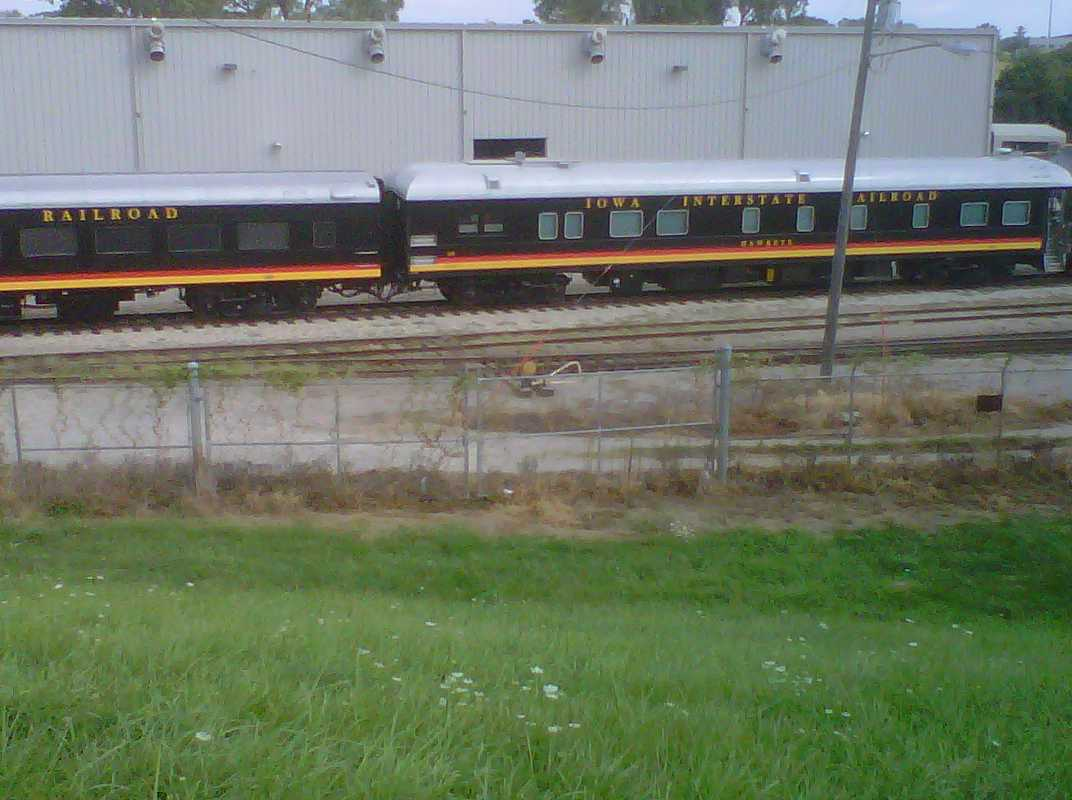
Iowa Interstate Railroad passenger cars near CRANDIC shops in Cedar Rapids, Iowa, Iowa.

IAIS uses 42 locomotives and two slugs to power its trains:

- 4 EMD SD38-2 (Numbered 150-153)
- 20 GE ES44AC (Numbered 500-519); unit 513 was painted in a Rock Island commemorative scheme, until it wrecked after hitting a tractor-trailer; unit 516 is painted in a Rock Island inspired 30th anniversary paint scheme.
- 1 EMD GP38 (Numbered 601)
- 17 EMD GP38-2 (Numbered 700-703; 705; 707-708; 710-716; 718-719; 721) 720 was sold/leased to ADM in Des Moines, Iowa in 2017.
- 2 Slugs (Numbered 650 and 651) 601 and 650 are semi-permanently mated, as are 721 and 651

In 2006, IAIS also purchased two ex-China Railways QJ 2-10-2 steam locomotives, numbered 6988 and 7081 for special excursion trains and fundraising events. No. 6988 has been "Americanized", with a paint scheme inspired by Iowa Interstate's ES44AC locomotives. No. 7081 retains its original China Railways paint with Iowa Interstate badges. Both were later donated to Central States Steam Preservation Association.

Since 2018, the No. 6988 has made several excursion trips to raise money for local volunteer fire departments and promote awareness of Operation Lifesaver. As of 2022, both No. 6988 and No. 7081 are out of service pending overhaul; the former is currently located at the Railroading Heritage of Midwest America in Silvis, Illinois.

=== Pop-Up Metro ===
The Railroad Development Corporation has ordered at least one 2-car Class 230-variant of the Vivarail D-Train to operate on the Iowa Interstate Railroad in 2021 as a "pop-up" metro service.

Iowa City, Iowa planned to use the Pop-Up Metro equipment to open a commuter rail line along the Cedar Rapids and Iowa City Railway (CRANDIC). This service was scheduled to open in 2025, but the project was cancelled in January 2025 after CRANDIC refused to allow passenger trains to run on their line.

== Company officers ==
Officers as of 2019:

- Joe Parsons, President and CEO
- Carrie Evans, Vice President Sales & Marketing
- Allen Polfer, CFO
- Al Satunas, COO
- Greg Wilson, Director- Operating Systems
- Bryan Pierce, Director of Information Technology
- Tom Meierhoff, Director of Compliance and Dispatch
- Adam Sutherland, Director of Safety and Security
- Mike Stuver- Chief Transportation Officer
- Chad Lambi, Chief Engineer
- Andrew Reid, Chief Mechanical Officer
- Bobbi Allen, Director of Human Resources

Former Presidents of the Iowa Interstate Railroad:

- Frederic W. Yocum Jr.
- Doug Christy
- Jon R. Roy
- Dennis H. Miller
- Jerome Lipka

Preceded by Wheeling and Lake Erie Railway (1990)	Regional Railroad of the Year; 2025	Succeeded by Current
