= Moline station =

Building in Moline, Illinois, US

Moline, IL
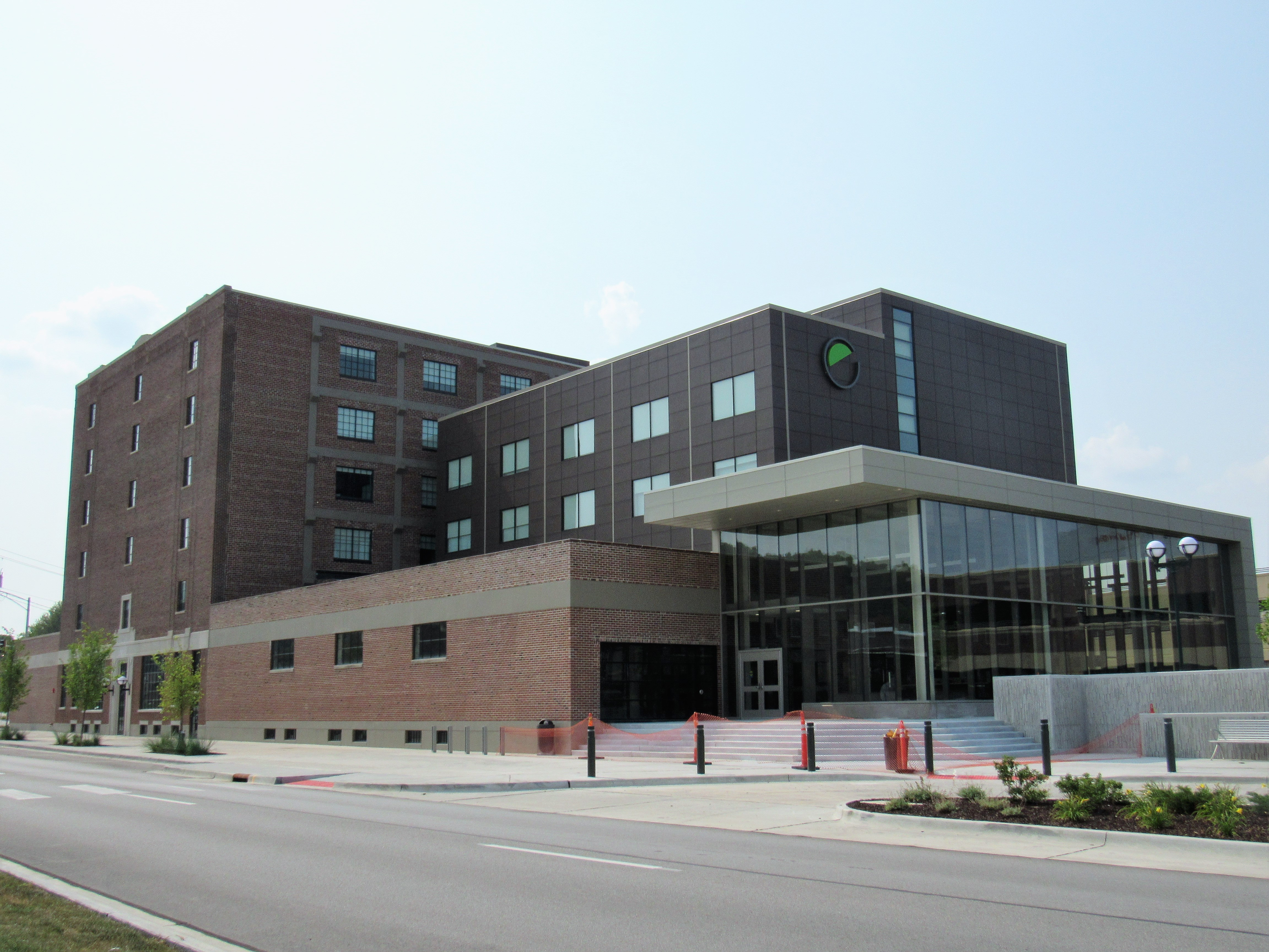
- The Q in downtown Moline, which currently houses an Element Hotel by Westin, and is planned to additionally house the Amtrak station and a multi-modal transit hub

General information
- Location: 1205 4th Avenue; Moline, Illinois
- Coordinates: 41.50657°N 90.52029°W
- Owner: City of Moline
- Line: Iowa Interstate Railroad
- Platforms: 1 (planned)
- Tracks: 1
- Connections: Quad Cities MetroLINK; Amtrak Thruway

Construction
- Parking: Yes
- Cycle facilities: Yes
- Accessible: Yes

Former services
Preceding station	Chicago, Rock Island and Pacific Railroad	Following station
Rock Island toward Colorado Springs	Main Line	East Moline toward Chicago

Future services
Preceding station	Amtrak	Following station
Terminus	Quad Cities Proposed	Geneseo toward Chicago
Location

Quad Cities Multimodal Station is a station building in Moline, Illinois, intended to serve as the terminus of the proposed Quad Cities Amtrak route. Renovations and expansion of a historic former warehouse were completed in 2018 to serve this purpose, but as of 2025, the new rail line has not been established and no train service currently operates at the station.

== History ==
Until 1979, the Rock Island Railroad's Quad Cities Rocket served the Quad Cities. However, due to poor on-time performance and deteriorating track conditions, ridership declined substantially. The state of Illinois subsequently pulled the subsidy keeping the train running, leaving the Quad Cities without passenger rail service.

In 2008, efforts to restore passenger rail service to the Quad Cities were set in motion. In 2010, the City of Moline got a federal TIGER grant for construction of the station. However, in early 2015, Governor Bruce Rauner put all major spending projects under review, including the Chicago-Quad Cities Amtrak line. Despite this, construction on the station started in 2015. By June 2016, under threat of losing the federal funding for the Quad Cities line, the state released the matching funds needed to move the project forward. On February 24, 2017, it was announced that the station would be complete in August, with passenger rail service expected to commence soon thereafter. As of November 26, 2018, no service had yet been scheduled. In July 2019, a transportation bill passed by the Illinois state legislature and signed by Governor J.B. Pritzker appropriated $225M to the project. In its 2020–2025 service plan, Amtrak forecasted that the Chicago–Moline route would begin in fiscal year 2024 and attract 165,600 riders that year. However, as of 2025, the Quad Cities line is still inactive due to disputes between the Illinois Department of Transportation and the Iowa Interstate Railroad.
