= Chicago and Aurora Railroad =

- Aurora Branch Railroad; Chicago and Aurora Railroad
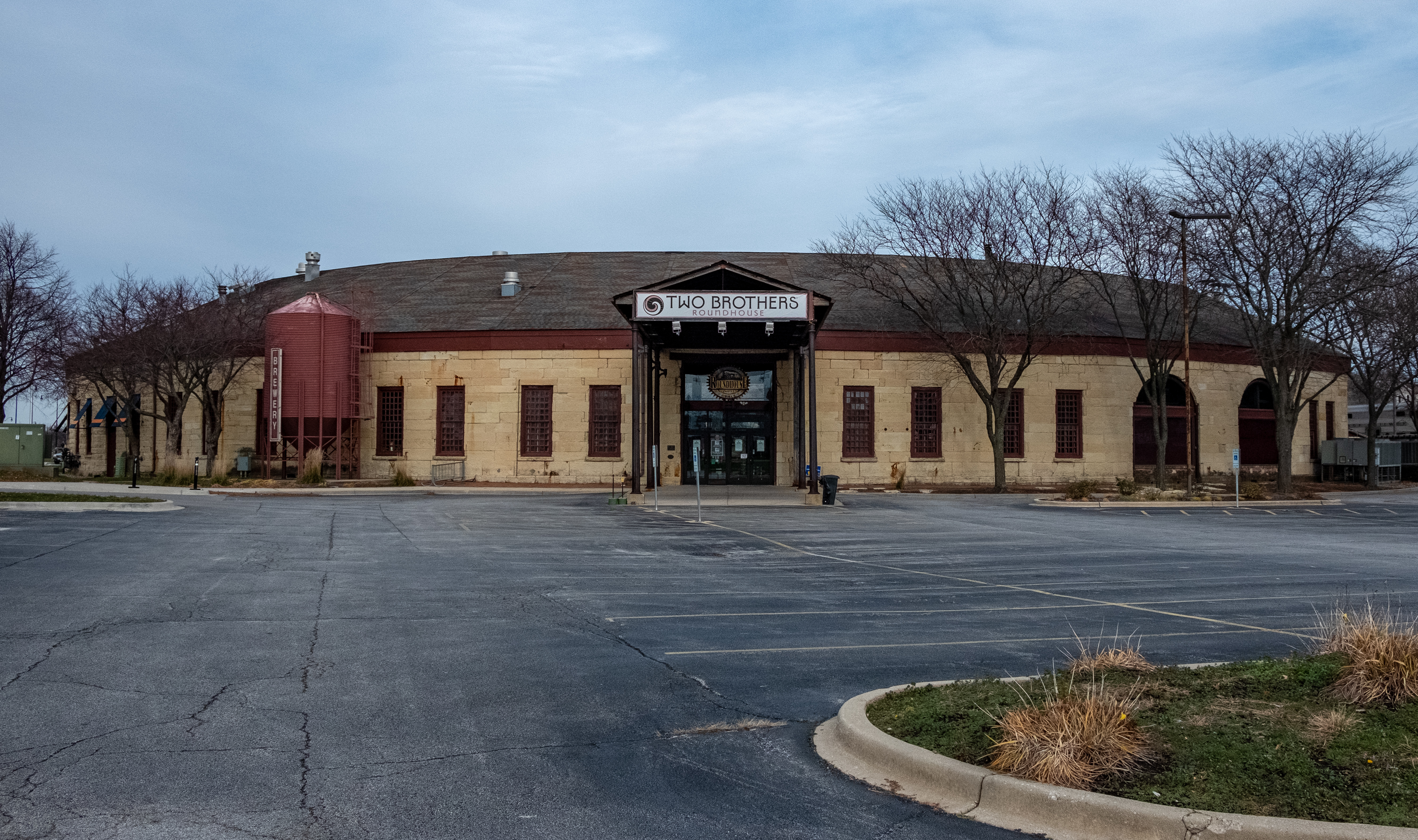
- Aurora's Two Brothers Roundhouse

Overview
- Dates of operation: February 1849–February 14, 1855
- Successor: Chicago, Burlington and Quincy Railroad

The Chicago and Aurora Railroad was a direct predecessor of the Chicago, Burlington and Quincy Railroad. Its original incorporation as the Aurora Branch Railroad, chartered in February 1849, started as a twelve-mile branch line which Class I giant BNSF cites as the beginning of their empire: this "short stretch of track set BNSF’s destiny into ‘loco-motion’ and grew over many decades into a network spanning 32,500 miles." Beginning in 1853, as the Chicago and Aurora Railroad, the company's tracks eventually extended from Chicago to Mendota via Aurora, Illinois, also creating what would become the oldest commuter line in the Chicago area.

== History ==
=== The Aurora Branch Railroad ===
==== The original branch line ====
The Chicago and Aurora Railroad's first incarnation was the Aurora Branch Railroad (ABRR), which was chartered by the Illinois General Assembly on February 12, 1849, to build a line from the Galena and Chicago Union Railroad (G&CU) to Aurora. According to railroad historian A. W. Newton, "The Galena and Chicago Union Railroad was then under construction, passing some twelve miles to the north, and agitation started for the construction of a line from Aurora to a connection with this road, thus giving access to Chicago." Village leaders in both Aurora and Batavia wanted to avoid the 38-mile wagon rides to and from Chicago, but they also worried about losing economic opportunities if the G&CU were to pass them by.

Once the charter was obtained, surveying began almost immediately, and construction started in early 1850, working southeast from Turner Junction (now West Chicago) and reaching Batavia in late August 1850. After a major celebration there, daily train service between Batavia and Chicago began on September 2, 1850. Construction to Aurora was completed on October 4, and the railroad company announced that beginning October 21, 1850, two round trips a day would be scheduled to Chicago and back. Customers paid $1.25 to travel from Aurora to Chicago, while the fare to Aurora from Chicago was $1.10. The trackage between Aurora and West Chicago is still in service as an industrial spur, though the connection in West Chicago has been removed.

Like many early railroads, the Aurora Branch at first was working on a thin financial margin. Any new railroad had to spend huge amounts on track construction, rolling stock, and maintenance facilities before it could even begin to make money, so people were often wary about investing in them. The Aurora Branch sold less than half of its original stock outlay of $100,000, which was enough to pay for surveying and grading the route. But to purchase track, locomotives, and cars, in March of 1850 the board offered bonds for sale worth $45,000 in total, with the directors personally providing guarantees of payment if necessary.

The company economized by using both second-hand tracks and locomotives. In construction, they used wooden rails covered with strap iron which they had purchased used from the Buffalo and Niagara Falls Railroad; this matched the tracks built by the Galena and Chicago Union Railroad. It appears that the first locomotive used on the Aurora Branch was leased from the Galena and Chicago Union; called the Pioneer, it was a 4-2-0 wood-burning engine built by the Baldwin Locomotive Works. Late in 1850 the Aurora Branch purchased two engines second-hand: the Pigeon, another Baldwin 4-2-0 locomotive, bought from the Michigan Central Railroad, and the Whittlesey, a small locomotive with 4 driving wheels, purchased from the Buffalo and Niagara Falls Railroad.

However, once construction was completed, profits were strong enough so that on July 8, 1851, the Aurora Branch increased its stock to $600,000, and on the one-year anniversary of the branch line’s completion, October 31, 1851, the company also paid dividends of 10 per cent—though in stock, not cash—to investors who had covered 75% or more of the cost of their initial stock purchases.

==== Seeking to expand westward ====
But before they had actually raised money to purchase equipment, in March of 1850 the Aurora Branch’s board was already looking farther afield, resolving "that it is the desire of the directors of this company to extend the Aurora Branch Railroad to the most feasible point on the Illinois River, as soon as possible." Although they made arrangements to survey this route, nothing came of it immediately—other corporate maneuvers had to happen first.

In February 1851, the Aurora Branch’s stockholders and the Board of Directors instructed company officers to explore arrangements "with the Galena and Chicago Union Rail Road Company, or any other company or companies, for the purpose of uniting or consolidating this company." Newton speculates that the Aurora Branch sought this merger because, in the Galena and Chicago Union’s original 1836 charter, the Illinois legislature had given that company the right to build "lateral routes" from its main line; an extension of the Aurora Branch westward could be built only by the Galena and Chicago Union. However, Newton also points out that consolidation wouldn’t do much for the G&CU financially, basically just giving them a parallel route not very far from the one they were already building—so no consolidation took place.

Perhaps to help the Aurora Branch, however, sometime during 1851 the G&CU asserted its priority right and declared that they would build a line west from Aurora. This prompted the Aurora Branch in mid-December 1851 to seek a lease in perpetuity to use the Galena and Chicago Union’s right of way, which was formally agreed to on January 13, 1852. With the new lease, the Aurora Branch had secured the right to build westwards, against other possible contenders. In turn, the ABRR's directors identified a different destination for their route, planning to connect Aurora with the Illinois Central Railroad’s main line in the area of Mendota, which would reduce competition with the G&CU's line to Freeport. At that time, the Aurora Branch also signed a formal operating agreement with the Galena and Chicago Union to use their tracks into Chicago, beginning on January 1, 1852.

=== The Chicago and Aurora Railroad ===
The company was renamed Chicago and Aurora Railroad on June 22, 1852, and given expanded powers to extend from Aurora to a point north of LaSalle; this extension, to Mendota, was completed on October 20, 1853. Another amendment, passed February 28, 1854, authorized the company to build east from Aurora to Chicago via Naperville, and changed its name to Chicago and Southwestern Railroad. The latter provision was never acted upon, and was repealed by an act of February 14, 1855, which instead changed the name to Chicago, Burlington and Quincy Railroad (CB&Q). The Aurora-Chicago line was opened on May 20, 1864, by which time the CB&Q had, through acquisitions, acquired a main line from Chicago to Galesburg, where it split into branches for Burlington and Quincy.

The portion of the Chicago and Aurora between Aurora and Mendota remains a main line of CB&Q successor Burlington Northern Santa Fe Railway. This section of track makes up part of the Mendota Subdivision, which continues south-southwest to Galesburg. The original West Chicago-Aurora branch line is now an industrial track of the Chicago Subdivision.

Mendota subdivision hosts about 40 freight trains a day, and Amtrak Southwest Chief #3 and 4, California Zephyr #5 and 6, Illinois Zephyr #383 and 380, and Carl Sandburg #381 and 382.

It currently runs through Aurora, Montgomery, Bristol, Plano, Sandwich, Somonauk, Leland, Earlville, Meriden, Mendota, Clarion, Arlington, Zearing, Malden, Princeton, Wyanet, Buda, Neponset, Kewanee, Galva, Altona, Oneida, Wataga, and Galesburg. It interchanges with the Illinois Railway La Salle Line in Zearing, the Union Pacific Troy Grove Sub in Earlville, and the Illinois Railway Ottawa Line in Montgomery, all in Illinois.

The original Chicago-Aurora line, the oldest commuter rail line in the Chicago area, still exists today as Metra's BNSF Railway Line, operated by the BNSF Railway, which is the successor of the CB&Q through numerous mergers.

In 2017, the Mendota subdivision announced that it would become a designated quiet zone with the construction of the East Main Street underpass in Galesburg.

== See also ==
- List of defunct Illinois railroads
