= Galesburg station (Atchison, Topeka and Santa Fe Railway) =

Galesburg, IL
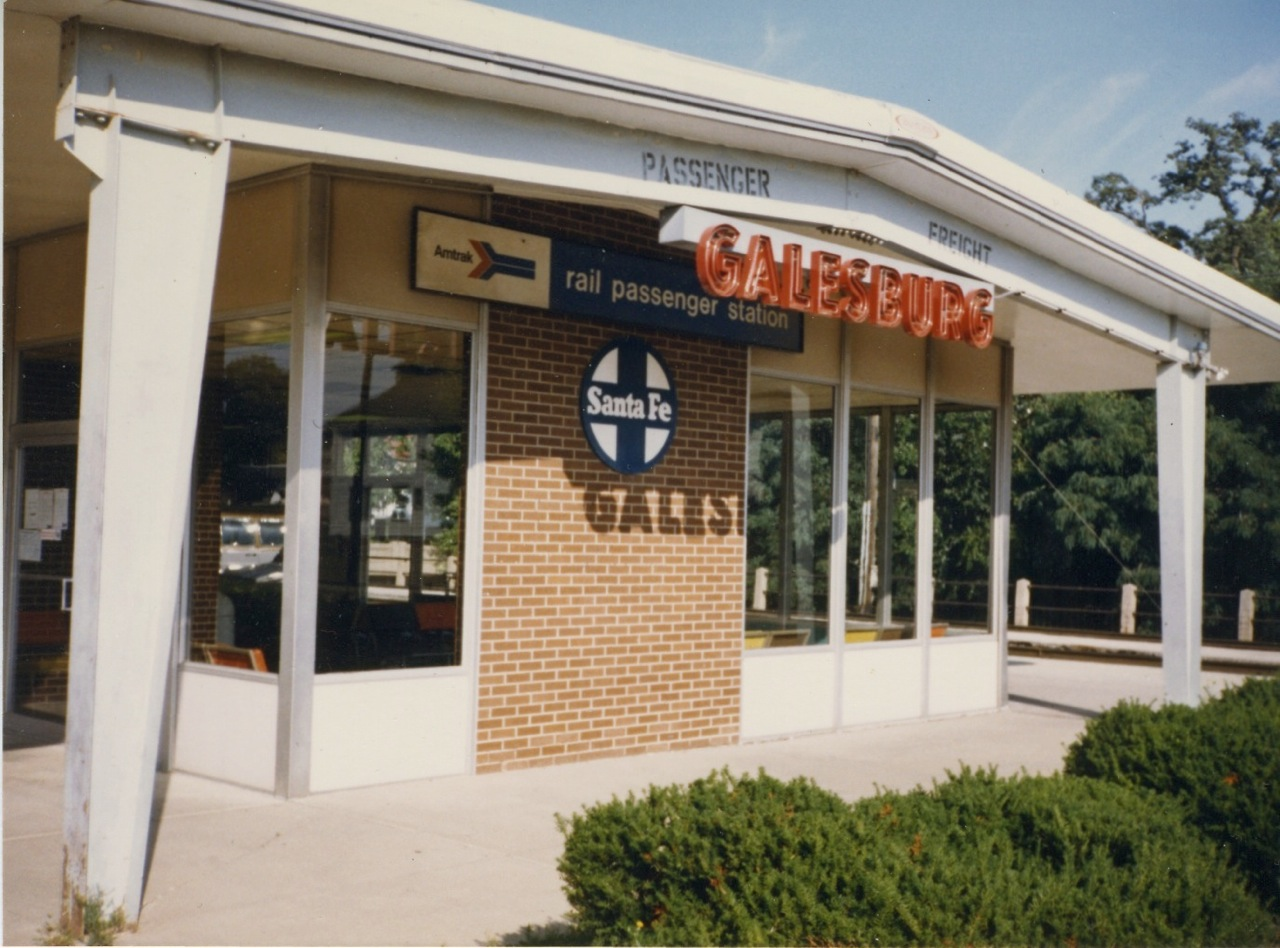
- The station in September 1985

General information
- Location: N. Broad Street at BNSF Railway tracks Galesburg, Illinois
- Coordinates: 40°56′58.9″N 90°22′18.7″W
- System: Former ATSF and Amtrak passenger rail station
- Owner: Atchison, Topeka and Santa Fe Railway (1888–1971); Amtrak (1971–1996) (depot); Atchison, Topeka and Santa Fe Railway (1887–1996); BNSF Railway (1996–) (tracks)
- Line: BNSF Railway Chillicothe Subdivision
- Platforms: 1 side platform, 1 island platform
- Tracks: 2

Construction
- Structure type: at-grade
- Parking: yes

History
- Opened: 1888
- Closed: August 1, 1996
- Rebuilt: 1966

Former services
Preceding station	Atchison, Topeka and Santa Fe Railway	Following station
Surrey toward Los Angeles	Main Line	East Galesburg toward Chicago
Preceding station	Amtrak	Following station
Fort Madison toward Dallas or Houston	Lone Star	Chillicothe toward Chicago
Fort Madison toward Los Angeles	Southwest Chief	Chillicothe toward Chicago
Location

Galesburg Santa Fe Station was a railway station in the west central Illinois town of Galesburg. The station was along the Atchison, Topeka and Santa Fe Railway's main line and served trains such as the Super Chief and El Captain. After Amtrak took over intercity rail in the United States, it was served by trains such as the Lone Star (1971–1979) and the Southwest Chief (1971–1996).

Although train service ended in 1996 and it has been demolished since, the site is still used if derailments cause trains to use the Chillicothe Subdivision instead of the Mendota Subdivision.

== History ==
=== Background ===
The first railroad to arrive in Galesburg was the Chicago, Burlington and Quincy Railroad in December 1854. The railroad served passengers at a large depot at North Broad Street and Cedar Creek. Galesburg was also a major junction for the CB&Q, since it was the point where many branch lines crossed the Chicago—Denver main line. Also in Galesburg was the railroad's roundhouse and hump yard, the latter still used with BNSF.

=== Atchison, Topeka and Santa Fe ===
The Santa Fe Railway was originally planned to bypass Galesburg 10 to 12 miles to the southeast. The railway was trying to build on the straightest line possible between Kansas City and Chicago—Galesburg was not on this line. Led by Clark E. Carr, the townspeople tried to persuade the railway to build through Galesburg. A guaranty—signed by many citizens of Galesburg—was telegraphed to the Santa Fe's headquarters in Boston. It offered 20 acres of land for a depot, as well as the right-of-way through town. To save money, the railroad used the right of way closely following the Cedar Fork Valley.

=== Station houses ===
First built in 1888, the station was made out of red sandstone. The two-story building had a slate roof and an octagonal tower facing the tracks. A unique feature of the station was that it had two different waiting rooms, one for men and one for women.

In 1964, the building was demolished and replaced in by a smaller, one-story building. The razing and construction of the new depot received mixed reactions by the residents of the town—many of them thought that the depot could be restored. The railway asked the city of Galesburg to remove the grade crossing with Cedar Street, directly west of the depot. In return, the Santa Fe would build the new station, and use the space where the old depot stood for parking.

It was not the only Amtrak station in Galesburg – the other station, located on South Seminary Street, served the Illinois Zephyr and the California Zephyr, and has now replaced the Santa Fe station for use by the Southwest Chief.

=== Closure ===
In 1995, the Santa Fe and Burlington Northern railways merged to form the Burlington Northern Santa Fe Railway. To allow trains to switch freely between lines, a connector outside Cameron, Illinois (southwest of Galesburg) was built. This connector (known as the Cameron Connector) allows the Southwest Chief to switch to the ex-CB&Q, ex-BN track, where other Amtrak trains already operated. This combined with the amendment of track vital getting to Chicago Union Station, causing Amtrak to move all operations in Galesburg to the present station. This move also made stations in Chillicothe and Streator, Illinois lose service.

== Gallery ==
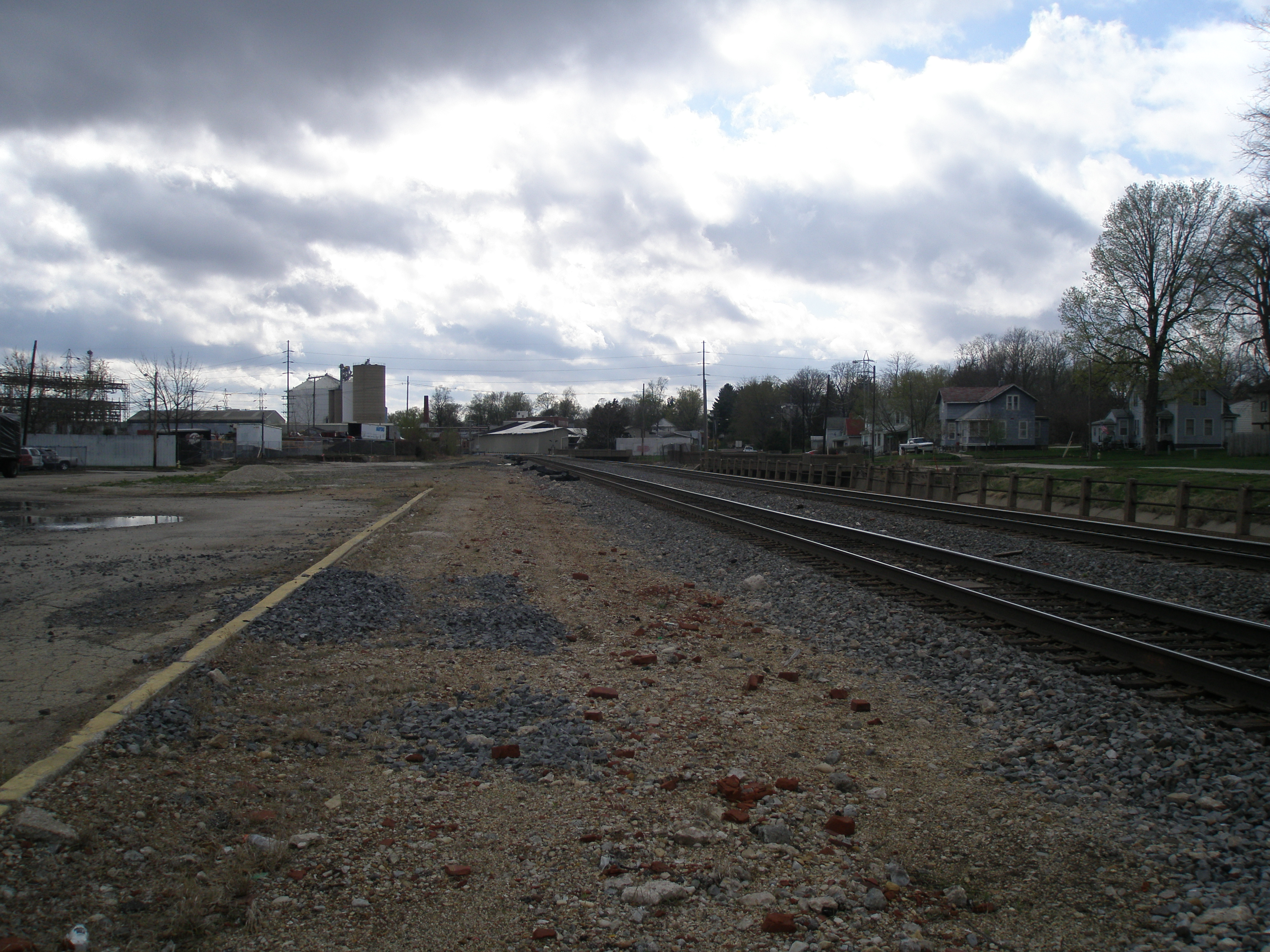
The site of the former station. The creek that follows the railway through town is visible to the right.

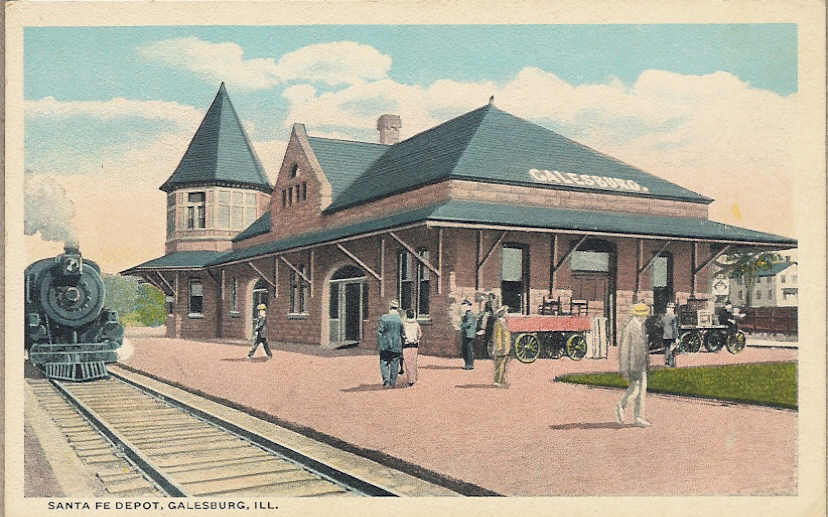
Postcard of the original station

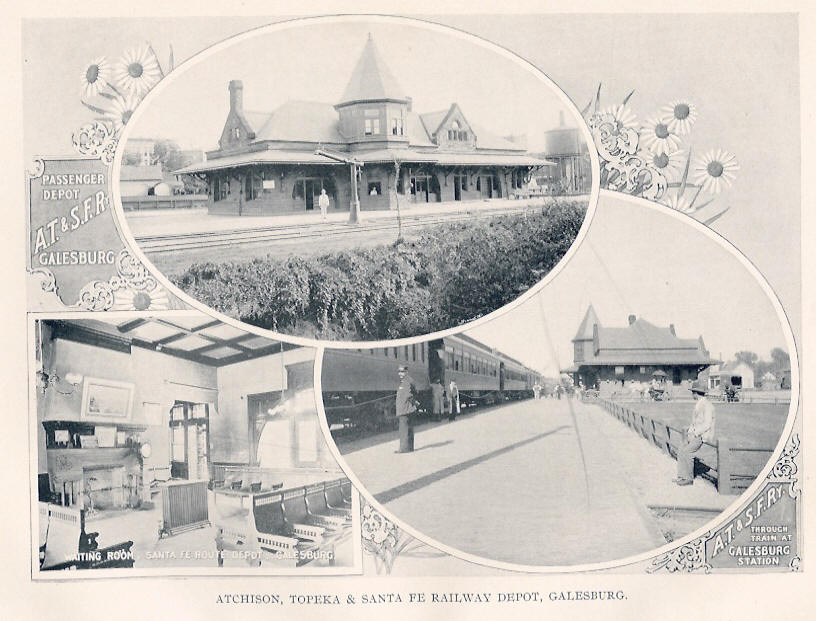
Postcard of the original station
