= Chillicothe station (Illinois) =

Chillicothe, IL
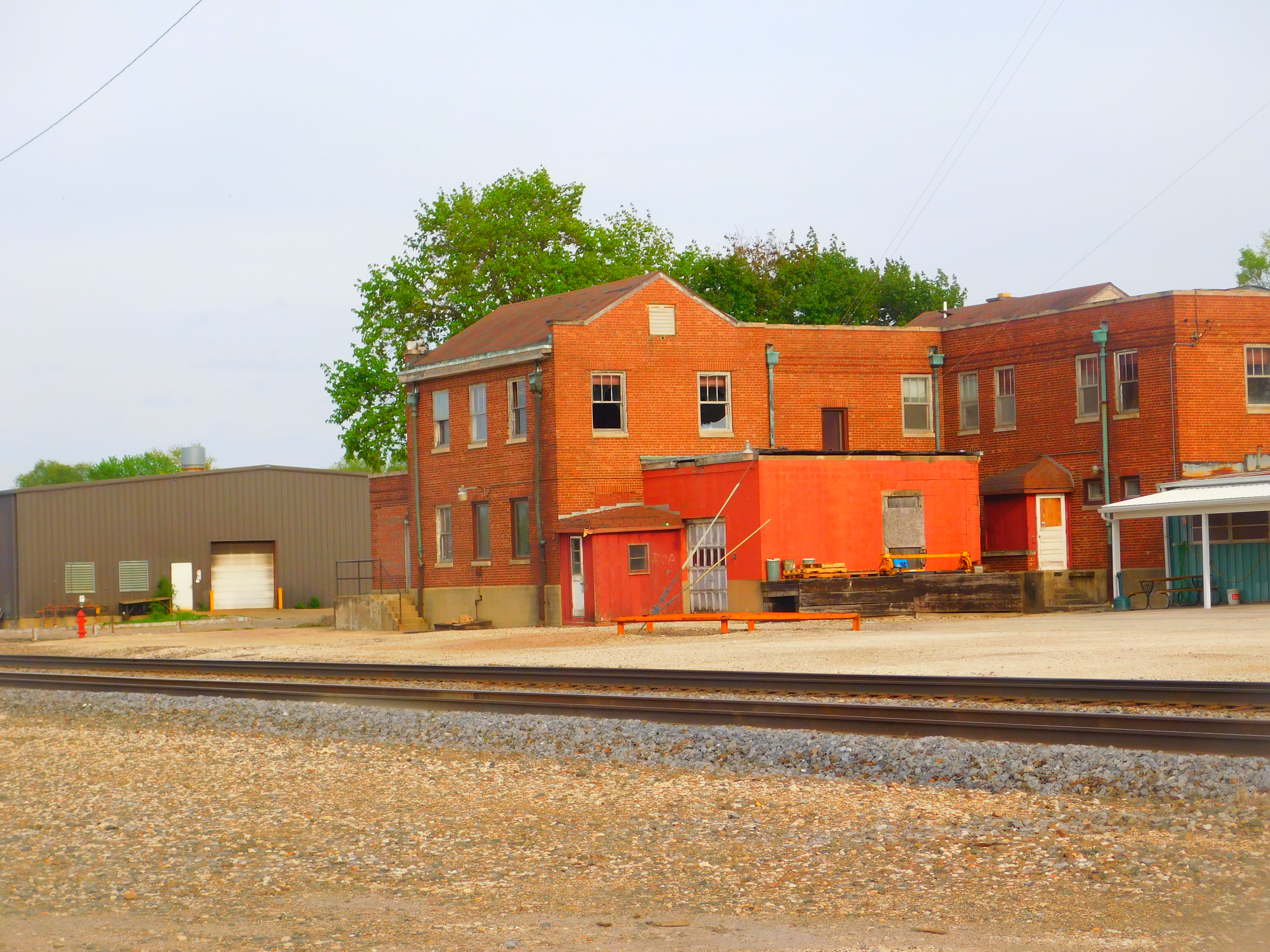
- The former Chillicothe Amtrak station in 2016.

General information
- Location: 1831 North Santa Fe Avenue, Chillicothe, Illinois 61523; United States
- Coordinates: 40.929659°N 89.495377°W
- System: Former Amtrak and AT&SF station
- Owner: BNSF Railway
- Platforms: 1 side platform
- Tracks: 3

Construction
- Structure type: At-grade

Other information
- Station code: CIA

History
- Closed: August 1, 1996

Former services
Preceding station	Amtrak	Following station
Galesburg (SF Depot) toward Dallas or Houston	Lone Star	Streator toward Chicago
Galesburg (SF Depot) toward Los Angeles	Southwest Chief	Streator toward Chicago
Preceding station	Atchison, Topeka and Santa Fe Railway	Following station
Edelstein toward Los Angeles	Main Line	Wilbern toward Chicago
Location

Chillicothe was an Amtrak stop in Chillicothe, Illinois; a suburb of Peoria. The station was a stop on the Southwest Chief between Chicago Union Station and Los Angeles Union Station before the opening of the Cameron Connector led to the train being rerouted between Galesburg and Chicago via the BNSF Railway's Mendota Subdivision in 1996.

== History ==
=== Atchison, Topeka, & Santa Fe ===
The building used as the Amtrak station between 1971 and 1996 was the second structure in Chillicothe that the Santa Fe had used as a passenger station. The original depot was constructed in 1887 and was destroyed by fire on June 13, 1963. Operations were then transferred to the Santa Fe Clubhouse. Following the creation of Amtrak, the Santa Fe shared the building as a division headquarters for freight operations until 1991.

=== Amtrak ===
Amtrak service at Chillicothe began on May 1, 1971, with the Chicago-Houston Texas Chief, a service previously run by the Atchison, Topeka and Santa Fe Railway. This route was renamed the Lone Star in 1974 and discontinued in 1979.

For most of Amtrak's first quarter-century, it was Peoria's only link to the national rail system. The short-lived Prairie Marksman ran to East Peoria in 1980 and 1981.

=== Today ===
The station site, Streator and the Galesburg station are currently served by BNSF on their Chillicothe Subdivision.
