= Chicago and Illinois River Railroad =

Overview
- Locale: Illinois
- Termini: Chicago

The Chicago and Illinois River Railroad was a predecessor of the Alton Railroad that built a line from Joliet southwest through Coal City, Illinois, to the Mazon River. A portion is now a second main track on the BNSF Railway's Southern Transcon.

== History ==
The Illinois General Assembly chartered the Chicago and Illinois River Railroad on February 28, 1867 to build a railroad from Chicago through Lisbon and Ottawa (the latter on the Illinois River) to the Mississippi River opposite Keokuk, Iowa, with a branch in the vicinity of Streator. An amendment passed March 24, 1869 removed the requirement to serve Lisbon and Ottawa. Construction began in 1873 on a route south of the Illinois River between Chicago and Streator, but in 1875 it ran out of money and leased the unfinished line to the Chicago and Alton Railroad. The grade southwest of the Mazon River crossing at Gorman was sold to the Chicago, Pekin and Southwestern Railroad that year, and the Alton opened the railroad between Joliet and the Mazon River on July 1. The Alton bought the property at foreclosure sale on September 4, 1879, and in 1881 built a connecting line from Coal City south to its main line at Mazonia (near Braceville), giving it two tracks between Chicago and Odell. Beyond the Mazon River, the Chicago, Pekin and Southwestern completed the line to Pekin on May 21, 1876, and obtained trackage rights over the Chicago and Illinois River to Joliet. Successor Chicago and St. Louis Railway, however, opened a parallel line to Chicago on December 21, 1885, and the old Chicago and Illinois River line between Coal City and the Mazon River was subsequently abandoned. In 1905 the Alton and Atchison, Topeka and Santa Fe Railway (Santa Fe) began operating these two parallel tracks as a joint double-track line between Joliet and Pequot, just northeast of Coal City.

At some point, Alton successor Illinois Central Gulf Railroad (ICG) sold the line between Plaines and Pequot to the Santa Fe for continued use as a second main track. When the Chicago, Missouri and Western Railway (CM&W) bought most of the old Alton in 1987, it acquired only a short piece of the ex-Chicago and Illinois River between Joliet and Plaines, as well as Pequot-Coal City and the Coal City-Mazonia connection. Ownership is now split among CM&W successor Union Pacific Railroad (from Joliet part of the way to Plaines, as the Plaines Industrial Lead), ICG successor Illinois Central Railroad (the rest of the way to Plaines, also known as the Plaines Industrial Lead), and Santa Fe successor BNSF Railway (Plaines to Pequot, as one track of the Chillicothe Subdivision), and the Union Pacific again (from Pequot to Mazonia, as the Pequot Subdivision). Illinois Central affiliate Elgin, Joliet and Eastern Railway leased the IC's segment in 2009.

== See also ==
- List of defunct Illinois railroads
