= Ancona station (Illinois) =

Ancona

General information
- Location: Ancona, Illinois
- Coordinates: 41.038999°N 88.872421°W
- System: Former AT&SF passenger rail station
- Owner: tracks owned by BNSF Railway
- Lines: Atchison, Topeka & Santa Fe Main Line and Pekin Branch
- Tracks: 2

Construction
- Structure type: at-grade

Former services
Preceding station	Atchison, Topeka and Santa Fe Railway	Following station
Leeds toward Los Angeles	Main Line	Moon toward Chicago
Dana toward Pekin	Pekin Branch	Terminus
Location

Ancona station (also known as Ancona Junction) was an Atchison, Topeka and Santa Fe Railway station in the unincorporated community of Ancona, Illinois. It a major junction station on the railway since it was point was where the Pekin Branch (also known as the Pekin District) split from the main line. Ancona was the eastern point where the Santa Fe decided to build track west to existing track in Kansas City in 1889. (It used former Chicago and St. Louis Railway trackage to reach Chicago) Freight trains still pass on the double-tracked main line and the location provides a good location for railfans. The branch line to Pekin was abandoned in 1982 although the former right-of-way can still easily be seen.
