= Chicago and St. Louis Railway =

The Chicago and St. Louis Railway was a predecessor of the Atchison, Topeka and Santa Fe Railway that owned a line between Chicago and Pekin, Illinois. More than half of the line is now part of the BNSF Railway's Southern Transcon.

== History ==
The Illinois General Assembly chartered the Chicago and Plainfield Railroad on February 24, 1859 to build a railroad from Chicago via Lyons, Plainfield, and Lisbon or Newark to Ottawa. In 1867, the General Assembly authorized a branch into Peoria County, and in 1869 it was renamed twice with expanded powers: first on March 29 to Chicago, Plainfield and Pekin Railroad, with the power to build on any route from Chicago via Plainfield to Pekin, and then on April 19 to Chicago, Pekin and Southwestern Railroad (CP&SW), with only Chicago and Pekin named as intermediate points. The road's first construction contract was dated August 21, 1869, and on January 6, 1873 it was opened from Streator to Pekin, except for about 6 miles (9.7 km) of trackage rights on the Toledo, Peoria and Warsaw Railway between Eureka (Streator Junction) and Washington (Pekin Junction). In 1875, the CP&SW bought an unfinished grade between Streator and the Mazon River at Gorman from the Chicago and Illinois River Railroad (C&IR), which it opened for operation on May 21, 1876, along with trackage rights into Joliet on the C&IR. The CP&SW was also known as the "Hinckley road" after president Francis E. Hinckley.

The CP&SW was sold at foreclosure on May 31, 1881 to Hinckley and reorganized on May 15, 1882 as the Chicago, St. Louis and Western Railroad. Another reorganization in March 1885 produced the Chicago and St. Louis Railway, which on December 21, 1885 opened an extension beyond the Mazon River, paralleling the old C&IR to Joliet and continuing on to Corwith in Chicago, from where it had trackage rights over the Chicago and Southern Railroad. Finally, in December 1886, new Atchison, Topeka and Santa Fe Railway subsidiary Chicago, Santa Fe and California Railway, bought the line as part of a project to extend the Santa Fe from Kansas City to Chicago, which, including the Atchison, Topeka and Santa Fe Railroad in Chicago from Corwith to near downtown Chicago, was completed on July 1, 1888. The new main line left the old Chicago and St. Louis at Ancona, making the Ancona-Pekin segment a branch line, the Santa Fe's only one in Illinois outside Chicago.

The Santa Fe and Pennsylvania Railroad (PRR) jointly acquired control of the Toledo, Peoria and Western Railroad (TP&W), successor to the Toledo, Peoria and Warsaw Railway, in 1960, and in January 1981 the Santa Fe bought the PRR's 50% share from successor Penn Central Corporation, merging it on December 3, 1983. The TP&W branched off the Santa Fe's Chicago line at Lomax, Illinois and headed east through Peoria (just north of Pekin) to Logansport, Indiana, and so this acquisition allowed the Santa Fe to abandon most of its Pekin Branch. However, the Santa Fe soon had second thoughts about the TP&W merger, and in February 1989 a new independent Toledo, Peoria and Western Railway acquired the old TP&W, as well a short remnant of the Pekin Branch between Crandall and Morton. The rest of the old line, between Corwith and Ancona, is now part of successor BNSF Railway's Chillicothe Subdivision.

== See also ==
- List of defunct Illinois railroads
