= La Junta Subdivision =

Railway line in Colorado and Kansas

The La Junta Subdivision is a railway line owned, maintained and operated by the BNSF Railway. The line stretches for 395 miles (636 km) across the south-central and southwestern parts of Kansas and the southeastern part of Colorado. The line branches off from the Emporia Subdivision at Ellinor, Kansas, and runs through Newton, Hutchinson, Dodge City and Garden City, all within the state of Kansas. The line connects with Boise City Subdivision at Las Animas Junction in Las Animas, Colorado, which connects it further to La Junta, Colorado.

The line is mostly single track, with short segments of double track at Newton and Dodge City. The line is dispatched from the BNSF control center located in Fort Worth, Texas. The methods of control are Centralized traffic control between Ellinor and CP 2206, and Track warrant control and automatic block signaling between CP 2206 and Las Animas Junction.

The Amtrak Southwest Chief passenger train uses the La Junta Subdivision on daily basis. About 6 to 7 trains pass in the western region of the La Junta Subdivision, mainly agricultural and mixed freight. Most traffic is routed over the Boise Subdivision. Other traffic in the eastern half of the line is mostly intermodal and busier traffic. Occasionally other trains are rerouted on the line as well.

== Connections to other railroads ==
The La Junta Subdivision connects with Union Pacific Railroad at Peabody, Newton and at Hutchinson, all three in Kansas.

There are connections with Kansas and Oklahoma Railroad at Newton and Hutchinson, as well as a discontinued connection at Kinsley, all three in Kansas. The line also connects with Garden City Western Railway in Garden City, Kansas.

The Union Pacific Railroad uses the La Junta Subdivision under trackage rights agreement between Ellinor and Control-Point (CP) 2206.
