= Gallup station =

Amtrak train station on US Route 66 in Gallup, New Mexico

Gallup, NM
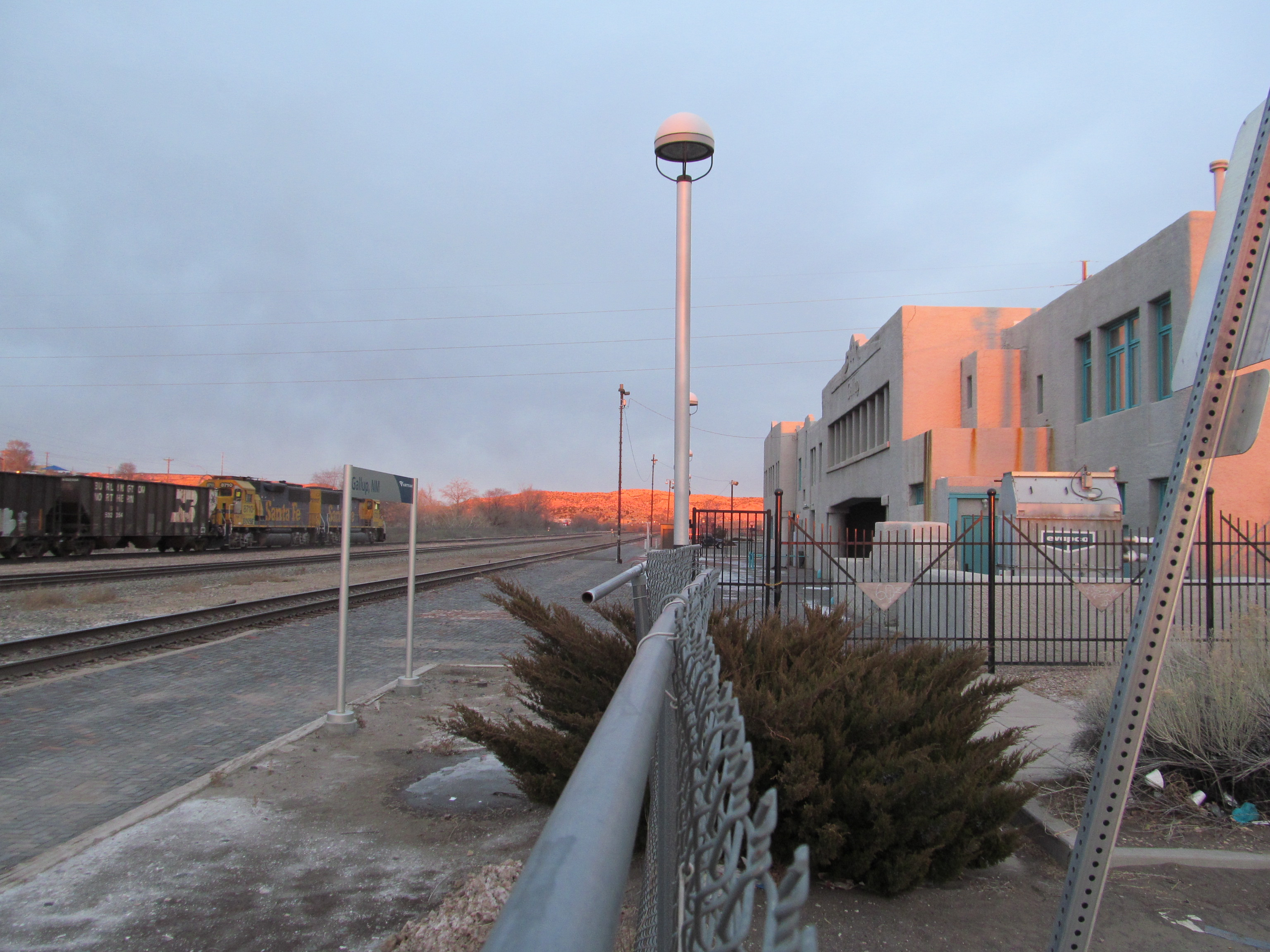
- Gallup Amtrak station

General information
- Location: 201 East Highway 66; Gallup, New Mexico
- Coordinates: 35.5293°N 108.7405°W
- Line: BNSF Gallup Subdivision
- Platforms: 1 side platform
- Tracks: 3

Other information
- Station code: Amtrak: GLP

History
- Rebuilt: April 1917–January 31, 1918

Passengers
- FY 2025: 13,568 (Amtrak)

Services
Preceding station	Amtrak	Following station
Winslow toward Los Angeles	Southwest Chief	Albuquerque toward Chicago
Former services
Preceding station	Atchison, Topeka and Santa Fe Railway	Following station
Manuelito toward Los Angeles	Main Line	Wingate toward Chicago
Location

Gallup station is an Amtrak train station at 201 East Highway 66 in downtown Gallup, New Mexico. It is the second busiest station in the state, with more than 16,000 boardings and alighting in 2014.

== Historic use ==
The two-story station was built in the Mission Revival style through 1917, opening on January 31, 1918, with no celebration due to World War I. Then one of a series of Santa Fe railroad station hotels built across the southwestern and central United States by the Fred Harvey Company was connected to the depot in 1923. The fabulous El Navajo Hotel was designed by the master architect Mary Colter, blending Pueblo Revival and Art Deco styles, and decorated using Navajo sand paintings. The hotel was demolished in a process starting on June 11, 1957 to widen Route 66. The depot reopened later as an unstaffed Amtrak station.

== Gallup Cultural Center ==
The city renovated the building in 1996 to serve as the Gallup Cultural Center to be operated by the Southwest Indian Foundation. In addition to a passenger waiting area, it is also home to the Gallup Visitor Center, which relocated to the station in 2004.

The Cultural Center houses a Storyteller Museum and Gallery of the Masters showcasing Native American Arts & Culture; the Kiva Cinema; and a coffee shop. and a gift shop featuring jewellery, pottery, rugs and blankets, and other pieces by local Acoma, Zuni, Navajo, Hopi and other Native American artisans. The Museum includes exhibits on weaving, sandpainting, silversmithing, trains, and Historic Route 66.

A statue of Navajo Chief Manuelito by Tim Washburn stands in a plaza front of the Gallup Cultural Center. Next to the plaza is the "Navajo Code Talker", a 12-foot bronze statue by famous Navajo/Ute sculptor Oreland Joe. The Navajo Code Talkers played a major role during World War II because the Japanese never cracked their language "code".

In the station a fence guards the platform from the rest of the station. This is to prevent people from getting onto BNSF's triple-tracked, high-speed and a busy Southern Transcon main line.

== Routes ==
- Southwest Chief
