= Chillicothe Subdivision =

Railway line in Illinois and Iowa, US

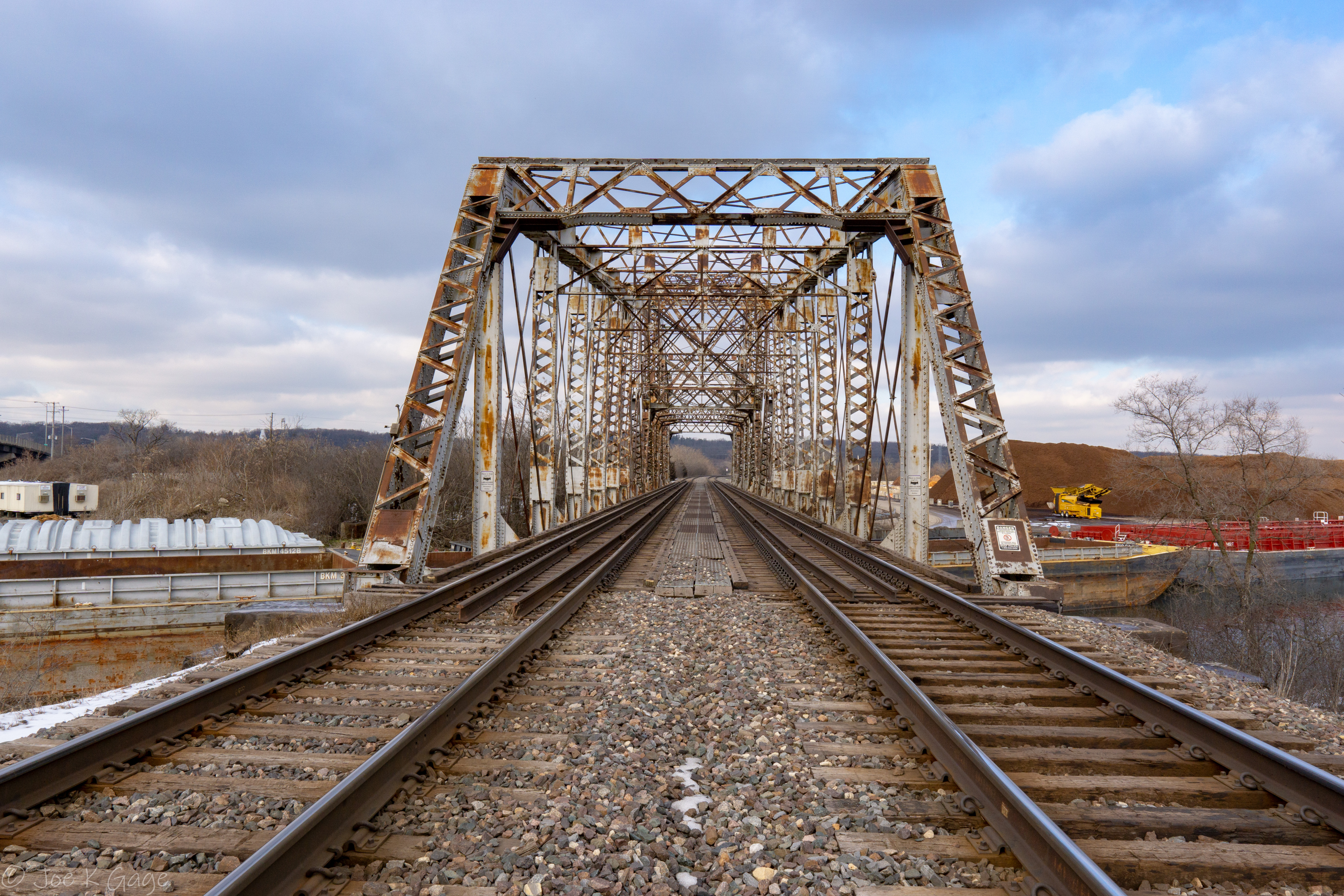
- Chillicothe Subdivision tracks crossing the Chicago Sanitary and Ship Canal in Lemont, Illinois

Overview
- Owner: BNSF Railway
- Termini: Fort Madison, Iowa; Chicago, Illinois

Service
- Type: Freight rail; Intercity rail (west of the Cameron connector)
- System: Southern Transcon
- Operators: BNSF Railway; Union Pacific Railroad; Amtrak

History
- Work began: 1873
- Opened: 1888

Technical
- Line length: 229 mi (369 km)
- Number of tracks: 2
- Track gauge: 1,435 mm (4 ft 8 1/2 in) standard gauge

The Chillicothe Subdivision or "Chillicothe Sub" (slang "Chilli Sub") is a railway line running about 229 miles (369 km) from Chicago, Illinois, to Fort Madison, Iowa, in the United States. It is operated by BNSF Railway as part of their Southern Transcon route from Chicago to Los Angeles. The Chillicothe Subdivision is a high volume route connecting three principal yards in Chicago (Corwith, Willow Springs, and Logistics Park Chicago) in the east and the Marceline Subdivision in the west which continues to Kansas City.

== Construction and physical structure ==
The Chillicothe Subdivision was constructed in segments beginning in 1873 by railroads that fell under the influence of and later merged into the Atchison, Topeka and Santa Fe Railway; with the first tracks laid between Streator, Illinois and Ancona, Illinois by the Chicago, Pekin and Southwestern Railroad. The line opened to traffic between Kansas City and Chicago in 1888. This line is double tracked for its entire length and crosses the Mississippi River between Fort Madison, Iowa and Niota, Illinois on a double track swing bridge (Fort Madison Toll Bridge).

The Chillicothe Subdivision makes numerous connections with other BNSF mainlines including the Ottumwa, Mendota, Barstow, Brookfield and Peoria Subdivisions within the Galesburg terminal complex. The route runs parallel to the Hannibal Subdivision for a short distance within the city of Fort Madison but there is not an active connection between them as traffic from Galesburg to St Louis is routed over the Brookfield Subdivision. Principal connections with other carriers include the Norfolk Southern at Streator and the CSX Blue Island Subdivision in Chicago near Corwith. As a former AT&SF route, mileposts are counted from the former Dearborn Station in Chicago although track was abandoned east of the CSX connection in 1996.

In 2019, a direct connection was completed between the Chillicothe Subdivision and the Chicago Subdivision which will allow the former BN and AT&SF lines to exchange traffic between Corwith and Cicero Yards without hazardous and time consuming backup movements. This project was completed as part of the Chicago Region Environmental and Transportation Efficiency Program (CREATE) Western Avenue corridor designed to align rail movements through the city along Western Avenue

== Freight operations ==
Traffic on the line is dominated by intermodal traffic flowing to and from the three yards in Chicago in a mixture of high priority "Z-Trains" with freight from UPS, FedEx Ground and LTL trucking firms; "Q-Trains" guaranteed intermodal with primarily domestic shippers like JB Hunt and Schneider frequently seen; and lower priority "S-Trains" with ocean containers. The names reflect BNSF current train symbol methodology although in radio communications trains are usually referred to by their lead locomotive's number.

There are also frequent run through trains in partnership with eastern railroads. Intermodal trains can frequently be quite long with consists up to 16,000 feet being run on the Southern Transcon route since it is predominantly doubletracked across its entire length. In 2021 increasing numbers of unit trains carrying wind turbine parts have been seen as well.

The Union Pacific has trackage rights over BNSF lines from Chicago to Kansas City and uses the Chillicothe Subdivision to reach its Global 4 intermodal facility near Joliet, Illinois.

== Passenger operations ==
This line was home to AT&SF passenger traffic in the pre Amtrak era, but passenger trains have been routed over the ex-Burlington Northern (CB&Q) Mendota Subdivision from Chicago to Galesburg since 1996. The Southwest Chief currently joins the Chillicothe Subdivision at the Cameron Connection west of Galesburg, before making a stop in Ft. Madison and continuing west on the Marceline Subdivision.

On December 15, 2021, Amtrak moved the Fort Madison passenger station from the historic division and crew change point, known as Shopton, within the Fort Madison yard to the prior AT&SF Fort Madison station on the Chillicothe Subdivision.
