= Streator station =

Train station in Streator, Illinois

Streator, IL
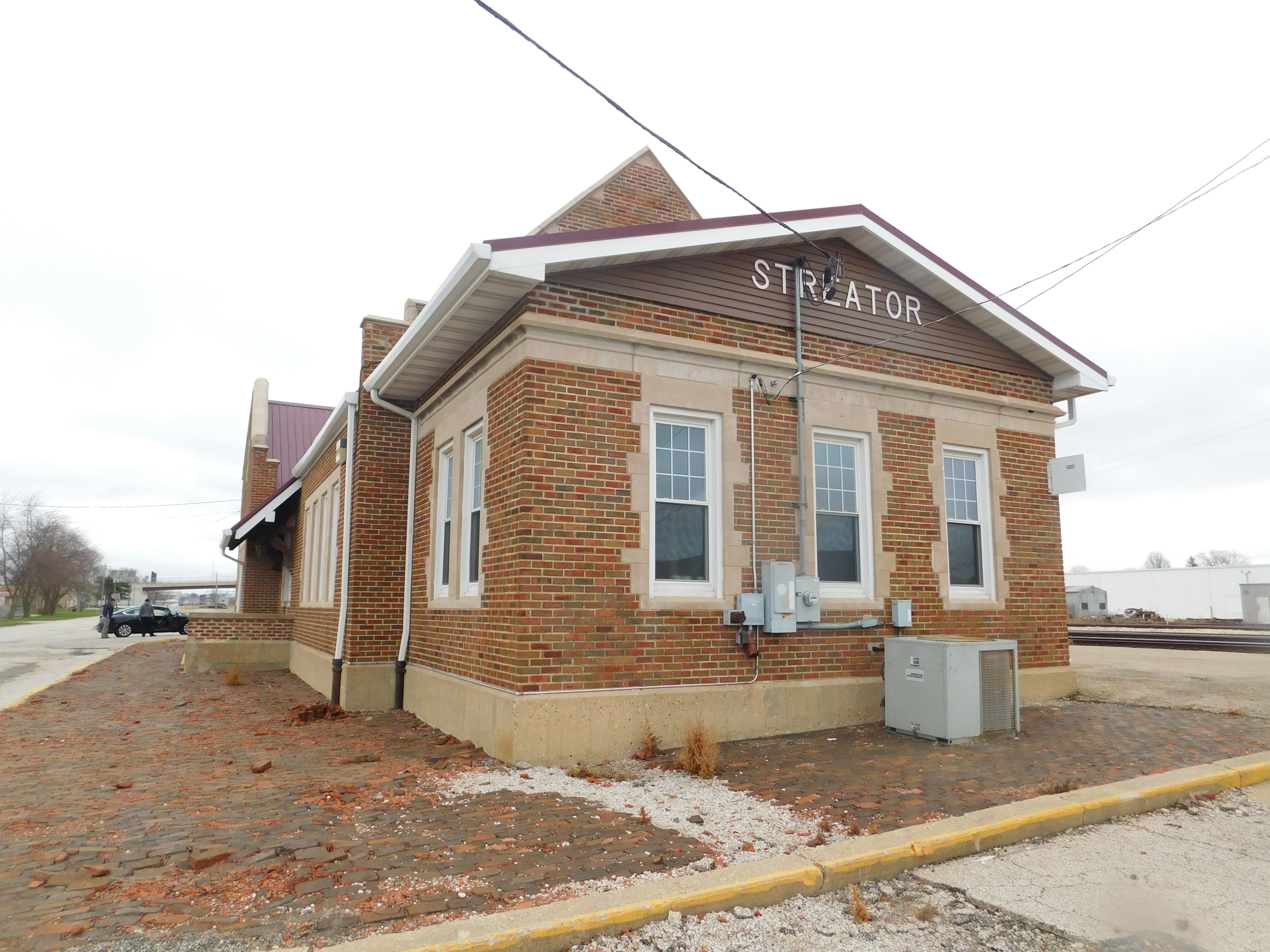
- The station depot in Streator in March 2017.

General information
- Location: 213 North Illinois Street; Streator Illinois 61364; United States
- Coordinates: 41.1230°N 88.8245°W
- System: Former Amtrak and AT&SF station
- Owner: BNSF Railway
- Platforms: 1 side platform
- Tracks: 3

Construction
- Structure type: At-grade

History
- Closed: August 1, 1996

Former services
Preceding station	Amtrak	Following station
Chillicothe toward Dallas or Houston	Lone Star	Joliet (Union Station) toward Chicago
Chillicothe toward Los Angeles	Southwest Chief	Joliet (Union Station) toward Chicago
Preceding station	Atchison, Topeka and Santa Fe Railway	Following station
Moon toward Los Angeles	Main Line	Kernan toward Chicago
Preceding station	Wabash Railroad	Following station
Services at Hickory Street Station
Terminus	Forrest-Streator	Clay toward Forrest
Preceding station	Burlington Route	Following station
Terminus	Aurora – Streator	Grand Ridge toward Aurora
Location

Streator station was a train station located in Streator, Illinois, United States. It was served by numerous Atchison, Topeka and Santa Fe Railway (AT&SF) passenger trains during its heyday. Amtrak (the National Railroad Passenger Corporation) served the station until 1996 with the Southwest Chief between Chicago and Los Angeles daily. When the Burlington Northern Railroad and the AT&SF railways merged, BNSF built a connecting track between the two main lines east of Cameron, Illinois, (known as the Cameron Connector). This allowed passenger trains to change from the former Chicago, Burlington and Quincy Railroad (CB&Q) main line to the Southern Transcon freely. This along with the amendment of a stretch of track that was essential for getting to Chicago Union Station forced Amtrak to reroute the Southwest Chief to bypass Chillicothe and Streator.

In 2013, the station received upgrades by BNSF Railway including "a new roof, brickwork, tuck-pointing, and new windows."

== World War II Canteen Monument ==
Streator station is home to a monument that honors the volunteers who served millions of soldiers and sailors passing by on troop trains. The canteen was open from November 26, 1943 to May 29, 1946 and served an estimated 1.5 million soldiers and sailors. The troops would be fed by volunteers boarding the train while it was serviced. The statue was unveiled on November 11, 2006.
