= Sibley Railroad Bridge =

Railroad bridge in Missouri, U.S.

Coordinates: 39.1801°N 94.1793°W

Sibley Railroad Bridge from east, the Sibley Operating Station in the background, left the Missouri River, 2021

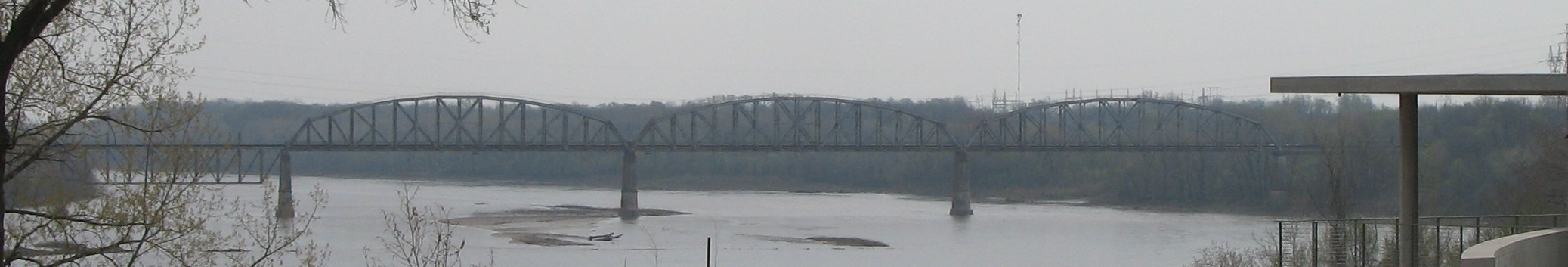
Sibley Railroad Bridge from southwest at Fort Osage

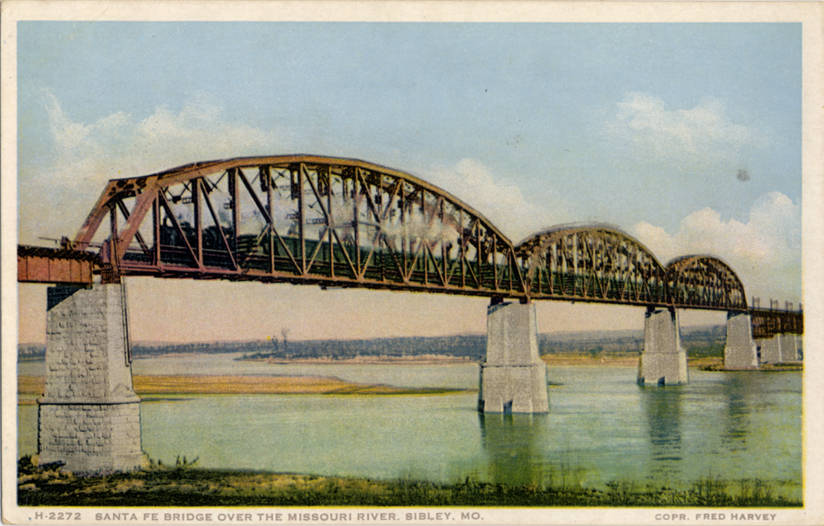
A vintage postcard depicting Santa Fe Bridge over the Missouri River

The Sibley Railroad Bridge is a three-span through truss single-track railroad bridge belonging to the BNSF Railway between Jackson County, Missouri, and Ray County, Missouri, at Sibley. The bridge carries the BNSF Marceline Subdivision over the Missouri River. It is the only single-track segment of the subdivision. The original 1887–88 bridge was a three-span Whipple through truss and was later reconstructed with Parker through truss spans. Besides the freight trains of BNSF Railway, it is also used by Amtrak's Southwest Chief.

After reaching the south bank of the river, the tracks curve west and pass Kansas City Power & Light Company's Sibley Operating Station, a coal-fired electrical generating plant. A now-removed loop track around the plant formerly allowed coal delivery to the plant by rail. The plant's 757-foot chimney is visible from several miles away.

The bridge can be viewed from the observation deck of the Fort Osage visitor center.

In 2023, BNSF began construction on a second bridge, parallel to the existing one, which once completed will eliminate the second to last single-track bottleneck on entire Southern Transcon between Chicago and Los Angeles, leaving only the crossing of the Salt Fork Arkansas River at Alva, Oklahoma.

== See also ==
- List of crossings of the Missouri River
