= Ellinor, Kansas =

Ghost town in Chase County, Kansas

Coordinates: 38°23′36″N 96°25′41″W

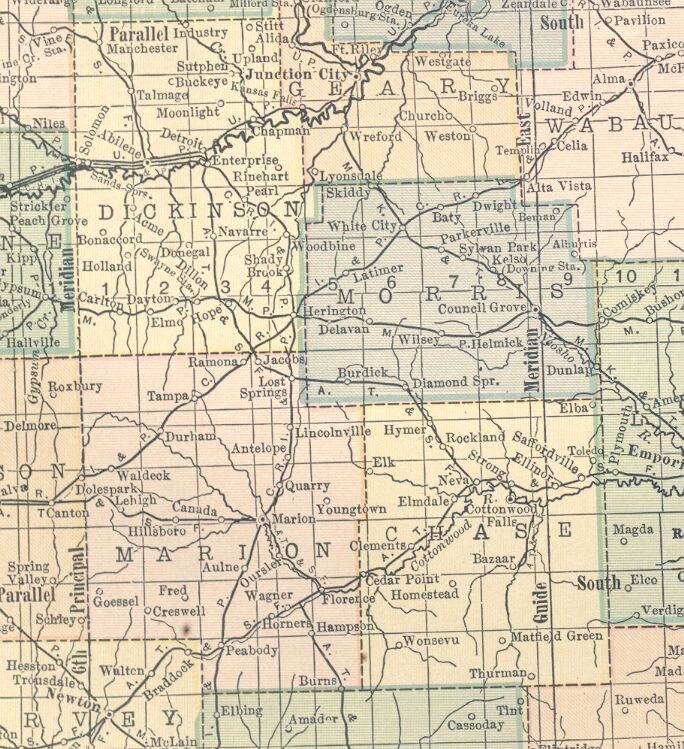
Location of Ellinor according to a 1914 atlas

Ellinor is a ghost town in Toledo Township, Chase County, Kansas, United States. It was located southwest of Saffordville, where the BNSF Railway splits.

== History ==
Ellinor (or Elinor) had a post office from 1871 until 1881.

== Transportation ==
The Atchison, Topeka and Santa Fe Railway formerly provided passenger rail service to Ellinor along their mainline until at least 1936. As of 2025, the nearest passenger rail station is located in Newton, where Amtrak's Southwest Chief stops once daily on a route from Chicago to Los Angeles.

== See also ==
- List of ghost towns in Kansas
