= Cameron connector =

Railway line in Illinois

Coordinates: 40.895262°N 90.490192°W

The Cameron connector is a section of track built in 1995–1996 near Cameron, Illinois, that connects the former Burlington Northern Railroad and the former Atchison, Topeka and Santa Fe Railway tracks, both which are now part of the BNSF Railway.

== Background and construction ==
In 1854, the Chicago, Burlington & Quincy Railroad (CB&Q) arrived in the town of Galesburg, Illinois, nine miles northeast of Cameron, followed by the Santa Fe Railway in the second half of the 1880s. The two railroads had two separate stations in Galesburg, with the Burlington station, which serviced trains such as the Nebraska Zephyr, Denver Zephyr and California Zephyr, being located on Seminary St. and the Santa Fe station, which serviced trains including the Super Chief and El Capitan, being located a few blocks northwest on North Broad Street. Continuing west, the two tracks intersected at Cameron, with the Santa Fe, heading southwest, crossing over the Burlington route, which headed directly west. In 1996, the Burlington Northern Railroad, which was itself the product of a 1970 merger of the CB&Q, Great Northern, Northern Pacific and Spokane, Portland & Seattle Railways, merged with the Santa Fe to form the Burlington Northern Santa Fe Railway, later renamed the BNSF Railway.

With the anticipated Burlington Northern and Santa Fe merger, it became necessary to connect the BN's Ottumwa Subdivision to the Santa Fe's Chillicothe Subdivision, the latter of which became part of the BNSF's Southern Transcon Route. Work began in 1995 and was completed on May 29, 1996.

== Route and infrastructure ==
Both ends of the connector, which cuts through farmland, have wyes along with signals that regulate the flow of train traffic that passes through the connector. Trains traveling on the former ATSF tracks enter the wye at a southwest-northeast angle. At the south end of the northern wye, the two tracks converge to one track, briefly traveling southeast, before the two tracks diverge to form the northern part of the southern wye, through which trains enter the former Burlington tracks, which travel directly east-west.

== Impact ==
The connector has resulted in a direct connection between the BNSF rail yard in Galesburg to the Southern Transcon.

The line has also had a significant impact for Amtrak. Prior to the building of the connector, the Southwest Chief operated on the Chillicothe Subdivision to Galesburg, via Joliet, Streator and Chillicothe. The building of the connector enabled the Southwest Chief to be rerouted onto the BNSF's Mendota Subdivision, used by the California Zephyr and a couple of short-distance inter-city Amtrak trains via Naperville, Mendota and Princeton. Southwest Chief service to Streator and Chillicothe was dropped as part of the realignment, although Joliet continues to see Amtrak service from other trains. The Chief rerouting through the Connector to the Mendota Sub tracks caused Amtrak to concentrate all of its Galesburg operations in the present station, and the station building along the former Santa Fe line was closed and later demolished.
