= Fort Madison Toll Bridge =

Bridge connecting Fort Madison, Iowa and Niota, Illinois

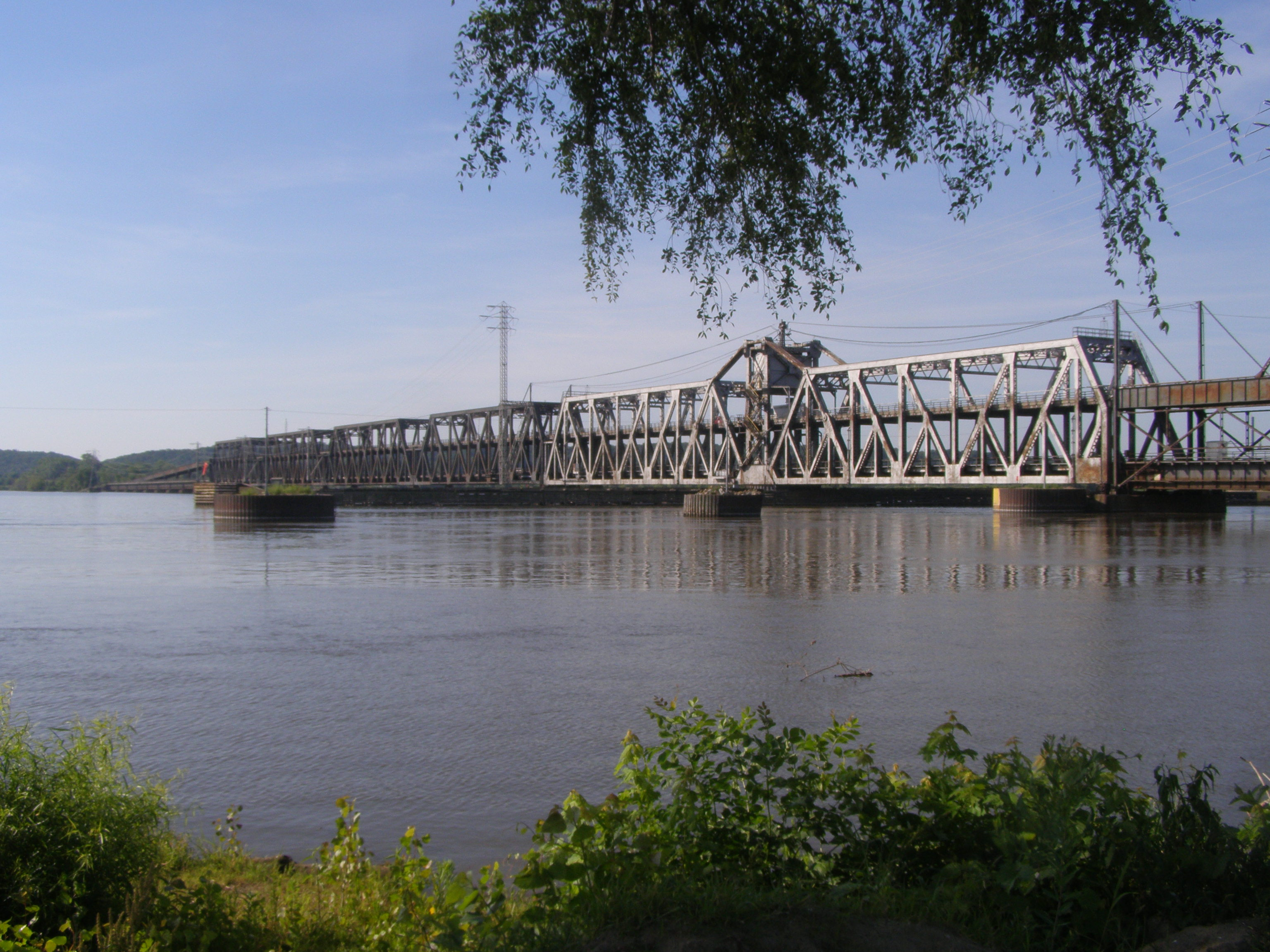
- Coordinates: 40°37′37″N 91°17′45″W
- Carries: 2 lanes of IL 9 and rail lines
- Crosses: Mississippi River
- Locale: Fort Madison, Iowa, and Niota, Illinois
- Other name: Santa Fe Swing Span Bridge
- Maintained by: BNSF Railway

Rail characteristics
- No. of tracks: 2

History
- Opened: July 26, 1927

Statistics
- Daily traffic: 63.4 trains per day (as of 2014)
- Toll: $2.50 as of December 1, 2025
- Fort Madison Bridge
- U.S. National Register of Historic Places
- MPS: Highway Bridges of Iowa MPS
- NRHP reference No.: 99001035
- Added to NRHP: August 27, 1999

Location
- Interactive map of Fort Madison Toll Bridge

The Fort Madison Toll Bridge (the Santa Fe Swing Span Bridge for the old Santa Fe Railway) is a tolled, double-decked swinging truss bridge over the Mississippi River that connects Fort Madison, Iowa, and unincorporated Niota, Illinois. A double-track railway occupies the bridge's lower deck, while two lanes of road traffic are carried on the upper deck. The bridge is about 1 mile (1.6 km) long with a swing span of 525 feet (160 m), and was the longest and largest double-deck swing-span bridge in the world when constructed in 1927. It replaced an inadequate combination roadway/single-track bridge completed in 1887. The main river crossing consists of four 270-foot (82 m) Baltimore through truss spans and a swing span of two equal arms, 266 feet (81 m) long. In 1999, it was listed in the National Register of Historic Places under the title, Fort Madison Bridge, ID number 99001035. It was also documented as survey number IA-62 by the Historic American Engineering Record, archived at the Library of Congress. Construction and photographic details were recorded in the Scientific American magazine.

The bridge is the western terminus of Illinois Route 9, which continues eastwards towards Canton, Illinois, about 80 miles (130 km), and Peoria, about 100 miles (160 km). Iowa Highway 2 formerly reached the bridge from the west. On July 26, 1927, operations were transferred from the original single-track bridge to the current double-track bridge. The first opening for river traffic occurred at 11:58 a.m. on July 26, 1927, for the scow C. W. Howell, traveling downriver with no barges attached.

The bridge is privately owned by BNSF Railway and is the river crossing for the Southern Transcon, BNSF's Chicago–Southern California main line. In 2022, between 40 and 100 trains crossed the bridge daily, including Amtrak's Southwest Chief. Amtrak's Fort Madison station is 2 miles (3.2 km) west of the bridge.

Per Coast Guard regulations and the BNSF Fort Madison River Bridge operations manual, river traffic has the right-of-way over train and vehicle traffic on the bridge. The durations of openings vary depending on weather, river current, size and number of boats, and, occasionally, mechanical problems. A typical opening for a tow with 15 barges lasts 15–20 minutes. The bridge opens over 2,000 times yearly, an average of more than five times daily.

== Automobile traffic ==
As of 2025, the upper deck of the Fort Madison Toll Bridge is open to automobile traffic. It is closed to semi-trailer truck traffic. The BNSF, which owns and maintains the bridge, has posted the following limits: Gross weight posted as no more than 16,000 pounds (7,300 kg). Width: 8 feet (2.4 m) Height: 14.3 feet (4.4 m) Length: 60 feet (18 m).

== See also ==
- List of crossings of the Upper Mississippi River
- List of bridges documented by the Historic American Engineering Record in Illinois
- List of bridges documented by the Historic American Engineering Record in Iowa
- List of road–rail bridges
