= Glorieta Pass =

Mountain pass in New Mexico, United States

Coordinates: 35°35′29″N 105°46′40″W

- Glorieta Battlefield Marker
- Interactive map of Glorieta Pass
- Elevation: 7,500 ft (2,300 m)
- Traversed by: I-25 / US 84 / US 85; Burlington Northern Santa Fe Railway

Third Approach
- Location: Santa Fe County, New Mexico, United States
- Range: Sangre de Cristo Mountains

Glorieta Pass (elevation 7500 ft.) is a mountain pass in the Sangre de Cristo Mountains of northern New Mexico. The pass is at a strategic location near the southern end of the Sangre de Cristos in east central Santa Fe County southeast of the city of Santa Fe.

Historically, the pass provided the most direct route through the mountains between the upper valley of the Pecos River to the east and the upper valley of the Rio Grande to the west. In the 19th century, it furnished the route of the westernmost leg of the Santa Fe Trail between Santa Fe and the High Plains.

The Battle of Glorieta Pass, the decisive battle of the New Mexico Campaign of the American Civil War, was fought near the pass in March 1862. The victory by the Union Army (primarily in the form of the Colorado Militia) prevented the breakout of the Confederate Army forces onto the High Plains on the east side of Sangre de Cristo Mountains, halting the intended Confederate advance northward along the base of the Rocky Mountains. The battle is commemorated at Pecos National Historic Park on the east side of the pass. In the 20th century, the pass became used as the route of U.S. Highway 84 and later Interstate 25. The town of Glorieta is located on the eastern side of the pass.

The stairwells of the Colorado State Capitol Building display cannonballs from the battle as ornaments.

In 1879, the New Mexico and Southern Pacific Railroad constructed a railroad through the pass, which became part of the second North American transcontinental railroad in March 1881. The NM&SP was absorbed into its parent company, the Atchison Topeka and Santa Fe Railroad in 1899, and the Santa Fe used the route for their Chicago to Los Angeles trains, including the famed El Capitan and Super Chief. Now part of the BNSF system, this remains the route of Amtrak's Southwest Chief, with one passenger train each direction daily, but little freight. It was one of the last places where semaphore signals were still in use on an active mainline anywhere in North America. They were retired and replaced with modern signals in November 2022.
