= Ancona, Illinois =

- Unincorporated community
- Location within Illinois Location within the United States
- Coordinates: 41°02′26″N 88°52′21″W
- Country: United States
- State: Illinois
- County: Livingston
- Township: Reading
- Elevation: 623 ft (190 m)
- Time zone: UTC-6 (Central (CST))
  - Summer (DST): UTC-5 (CDT)
- ZIP code: 61311
- Area codes: 815 & 779
- GNIS feature ID: 403495

Ancona is an unincorporated community in Livingston County, Illinois, United States. Ancona is located along a railroad line south-southwest of Streator. Ancona has a post office with ZIP code 61311. It formerly served the Santa Fe Railway at Ancona Station.

It takes its name from the Italian city of Ancona, capital of the Marches.
