= Southwest Chief =

Amtrak service between Chicago and Los Angeles

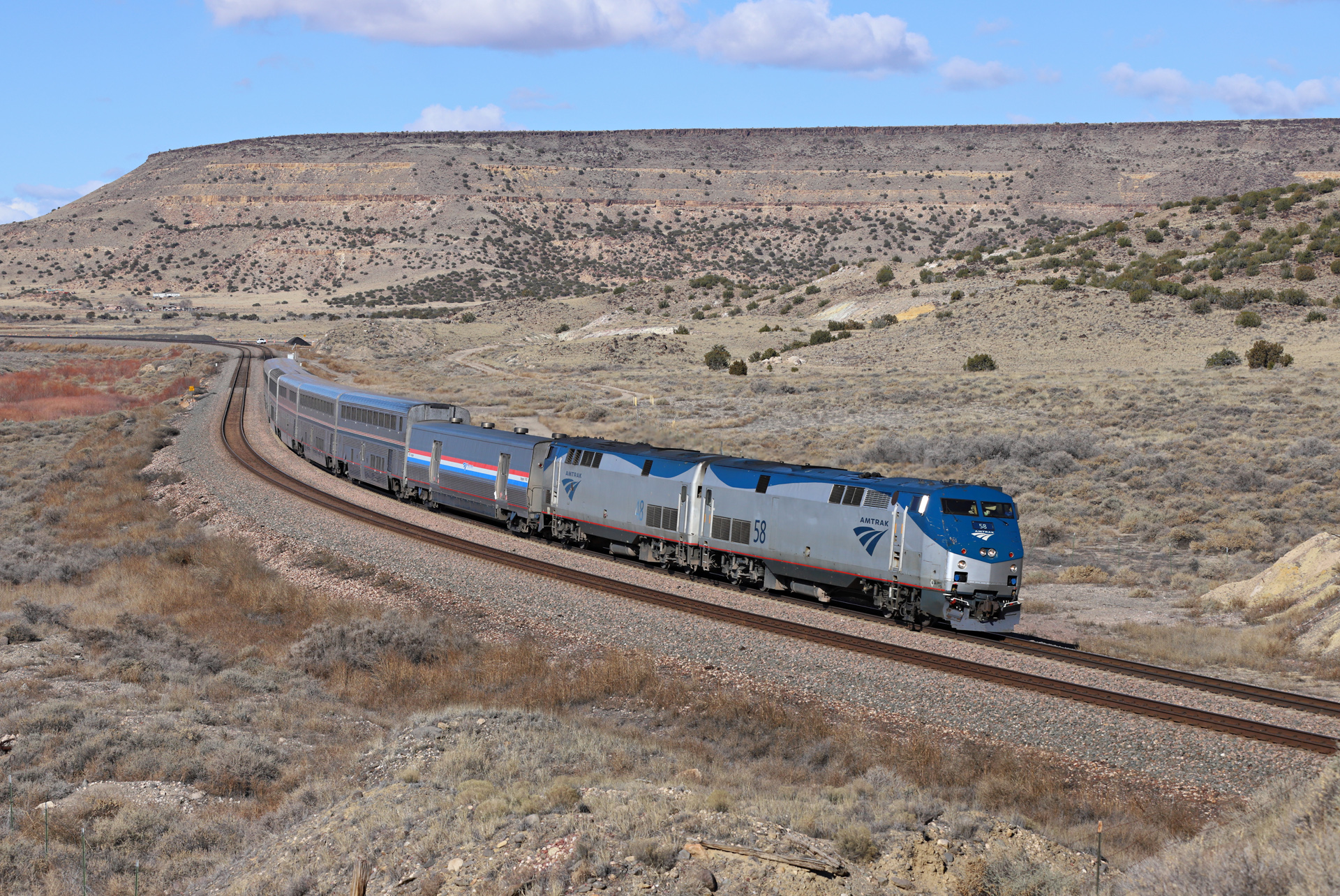
- Southwest Chief in February 2020

Overview
- Service type: Inter-city higher-speed rail
- Locale: Midwestern and Southwestern United States
- Predecessor: Super Chief, El Capitan
- First service: May 19, 1974 (as Southwest Limited); October 28, 1984 (as Southwest Chief)
- Current operator: Amtrak
- Annual ridership: 294,359 (FY 25) ▲12.6% (Note: Amtrak's Fiscal Year (FY) runs from October 1 of the prior year to September 30 of the named year.)

Route
- Termini: Chicago, Illinois; Los Angeles, California
- Stops: 31
- Distance travelled: 2,265 miles (3,645 km)
- Average journey time: 43 hours
- Service frequency: Daily
- Train numbers: 3 (westbound); 4 (eastbound)

On-board services
- Classes: Coach Class; First Class Sleeper Service
- Disabled access: Train lower level, all stations
- Sleeping arrangements: Roomette (2 beds); Bedroom (2 beds); Bedroom Suite (4 beds); Accessible Bedroom (2 beds); Family Bedroom (4 beds)
- Catering facilities: Dining car, Café
- Observation facilities: Sightseer lounge car
- Baggage facilities: Overhead racks, checked baggage available at selected stations

Technical
- Rolling stock: GE Genesis or Siemens ALC-42 locomotives; Superliner passenger cars
- Track gauge: 4 ft 8 1/2 in (1,435 mm) standard gauge
- Operating speed: 55 mph (89 km/h) (avg.); 90 mph (145 km/h) (top)
- Track owners: BNSF, NMRX

The Southwest Chief (formerly the Southwest Limited and Super Chief) is a long-distance passenger train operated by Amtrak on a 2,265-mile (3,645 km) route between Chicago and Los Angeles through the Midwest and Southwest via Kansas City, Albuquerque, and Flagstaff mostly on the BNSF's Southern Transcon, but branches off between Albuquerque and Kansas City via the Topeka, La Junta, Raton, and Glorieta Subdivision. Amtrak bills the route as one of its most scenic, with views of the Painted Desert and the Red Cliffs of Sedona, as well as the plains of Illinois, Missouri, Kansas, and Colorado.

During fiscal year 2025, the Southwest Chief carried 294,359 passengers, a 12.6% increase from FY 2024. However, this is a 13% decrease from its pre-COVID-19 pandemic ridership of 338,180 passengers in FY 2019. The route grossed US$59.3 million in ticket revenue during FY 2026, a 17% increase from FY 2025.

== History ==
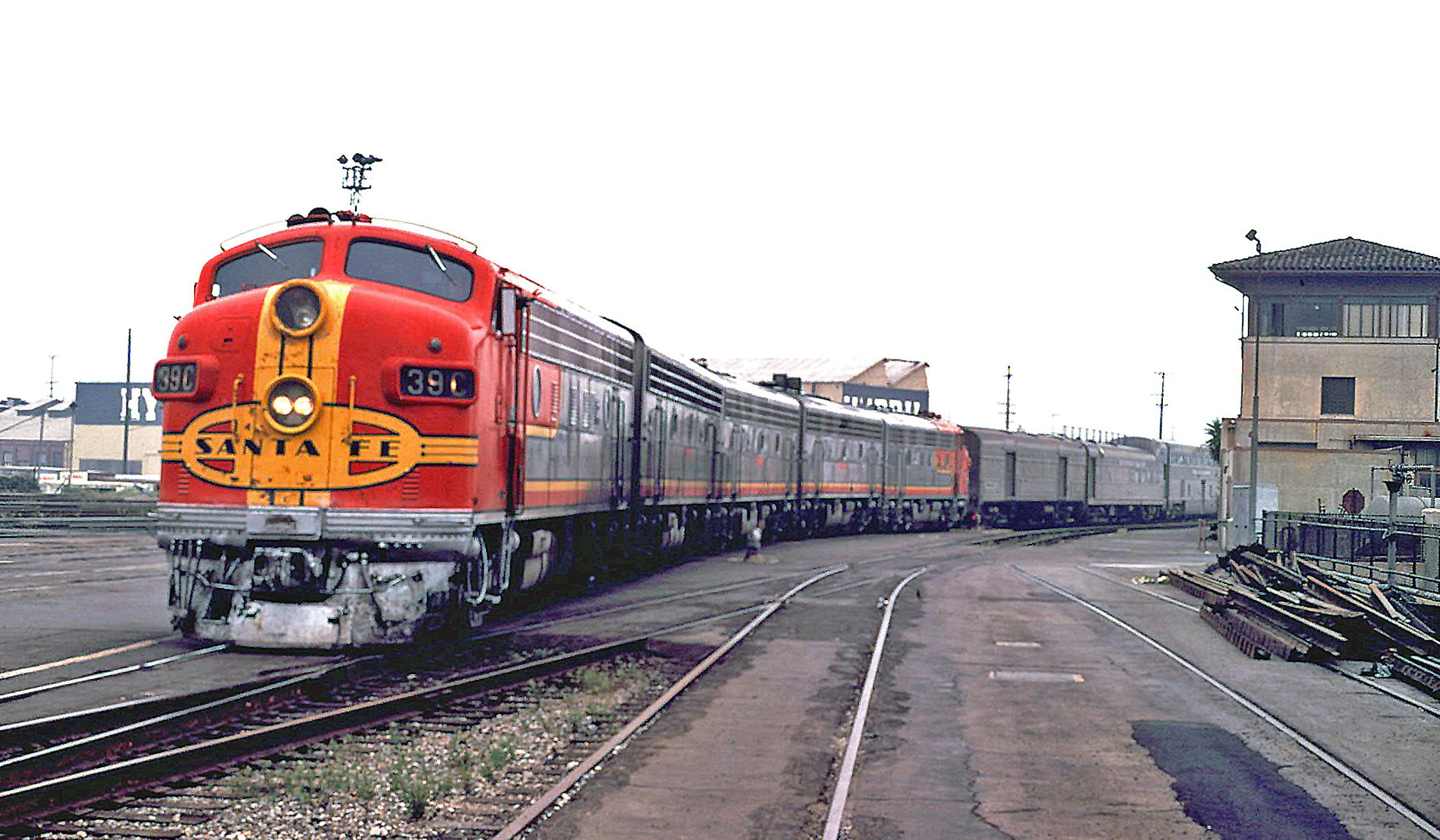
Super Chief arriving in Los Angeles on the last day Santa Fe operated passenger services, April 30, 1971.

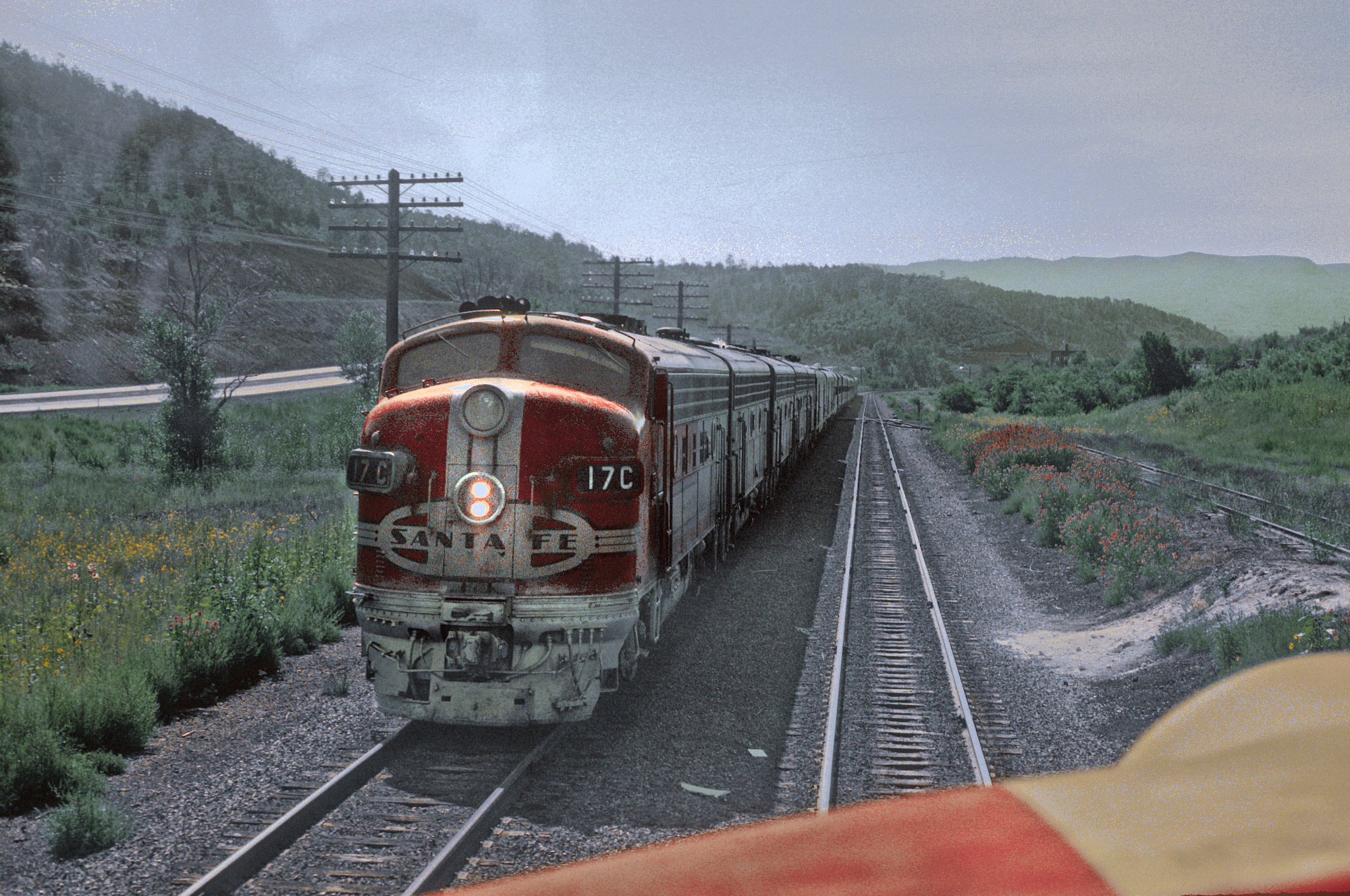
The Chief passing through Morley, Colorado in August 1967. Amtrak briefly reestablished service in the Summer 1972, supplementing it with the Super Chief/El Capitan.

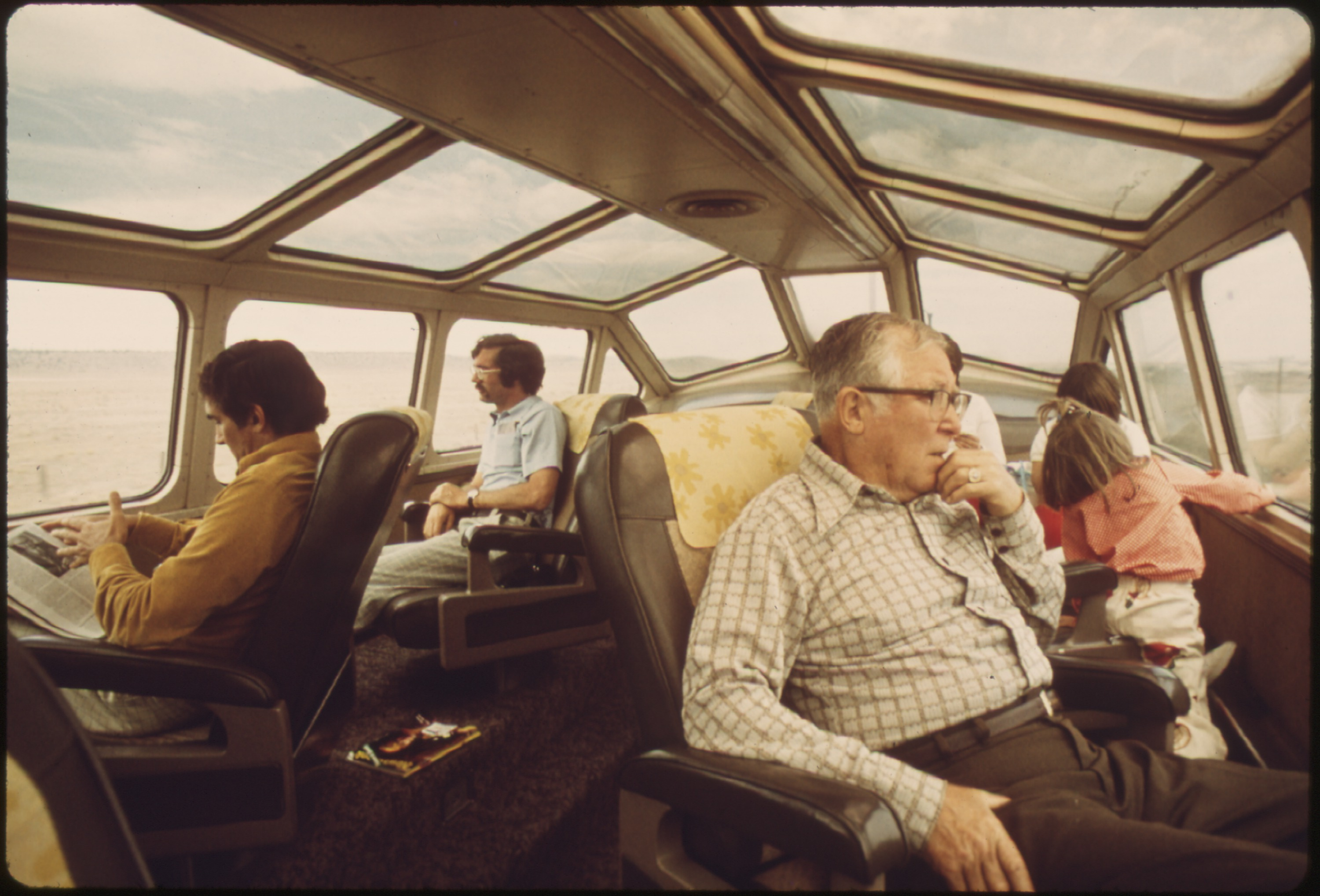
Southwest Limited dome car, 1974. Photo by Charles O'Rear.

The Southwest Chief is the successor to the Super Chief, which was inaugurated in 1936 as the flagship train of the Atchison, Topeka and Santa Fe Railway (AT&SF). For most of its existence, it was "all-Pullman", carrying sleeping cars only. The Santa Fe merged the Super Chief with its all-coach counterpart, the El Capitan, in 1958. The merged train was known as the Super Chief/El Capitan, but retained the train numbers used by the Super Chief, 17 westbound and 18 eastbound.

When Amtrak was created, Santa Fe was chosen as one of the railroads to participate in the formation of the new company. Initially, ATSF wanted to retain operation of its famed Chiefs. However, any railroad that opted out of Amtrak would have been required to operate all of its passenger routes until at least 1976. This led to Santa Fe turning over all the operation of its main passenger services to Amtrak on May 1, 1971. Some services such as the San Francisco Chief which ran between Chicago and the Bay Area via Wichita, Amarillo, Belen Cutoff, Barstow and Bakersfield were discontinued by Santa Fe the day before the transfer of the Super Chief/El Capitan operations to Amtrak. The prospect of being left alone with the operation of its less successful routes soon led ATSF to definitively cease the services that still remained under its operations, withdrawing completely from the passenger trains business.

Initially Amtrak retained the Super Chief/El Capitan names with Santa Fe's permission. From June 11 to September 10, 1972, Amtrak operated the Chief, a second Chicago–Los Angeles train along the same route, reviving the name of another notable Chicago–Los Angeles sleeper train operated by the Santa Fe. This was the only occasion on which Amtrak ran a second train to duplicate a long-distance service outside the New York–Florida corridor. Amtrak dropped the El Capitan designation on April 19, 1973, truncating only the name to Super Chief, and on March 7, 1974, the Santa Fe directed Amtrak to stop using the Super Chief and Texas Chief (another notable service originally operated by Santa Fe and which between Chicago and Newton, Kansas shared route with the Super Chief/El Capitan. Amtrak also took over that service in 1971, although after complaints filed by Santa Fe, it was renamed Lone Star.) names due to a perceived reduction in the quality of services, after the Amtrak takeover. In October 1980 the Southwest Limited began running with the new coaches Superliner I built by Pullman-Standard, being the fourth of Amtrak's western long-distance trains to be equipped with the new coaches (already running with such cars were the San Francisco Zephyr, Desert Wind and Empire Builder). On November 30, 1981, Amtrak replaced the ex-Super Chief "Pleasure Dome" and "Hi-Level" cars on the Southwest Limited with new superliners, completing the replacement of the original old Super Chief cars with the new cars. The old Hi-Level coaches used on the El Capitan inspired the design for the Superliners. Santa Fe managers, impressed by the design of the new Superliners, permitted Amtrak to restore the name Chief to the train, and Amtrak renamed it the Southwest Chief on October 28, 1984. In September 1993, the Chief was the first of Amtrak's western long-distance trains to receive the new Superliner II sleeping coaches built by Bombardier Transportation.

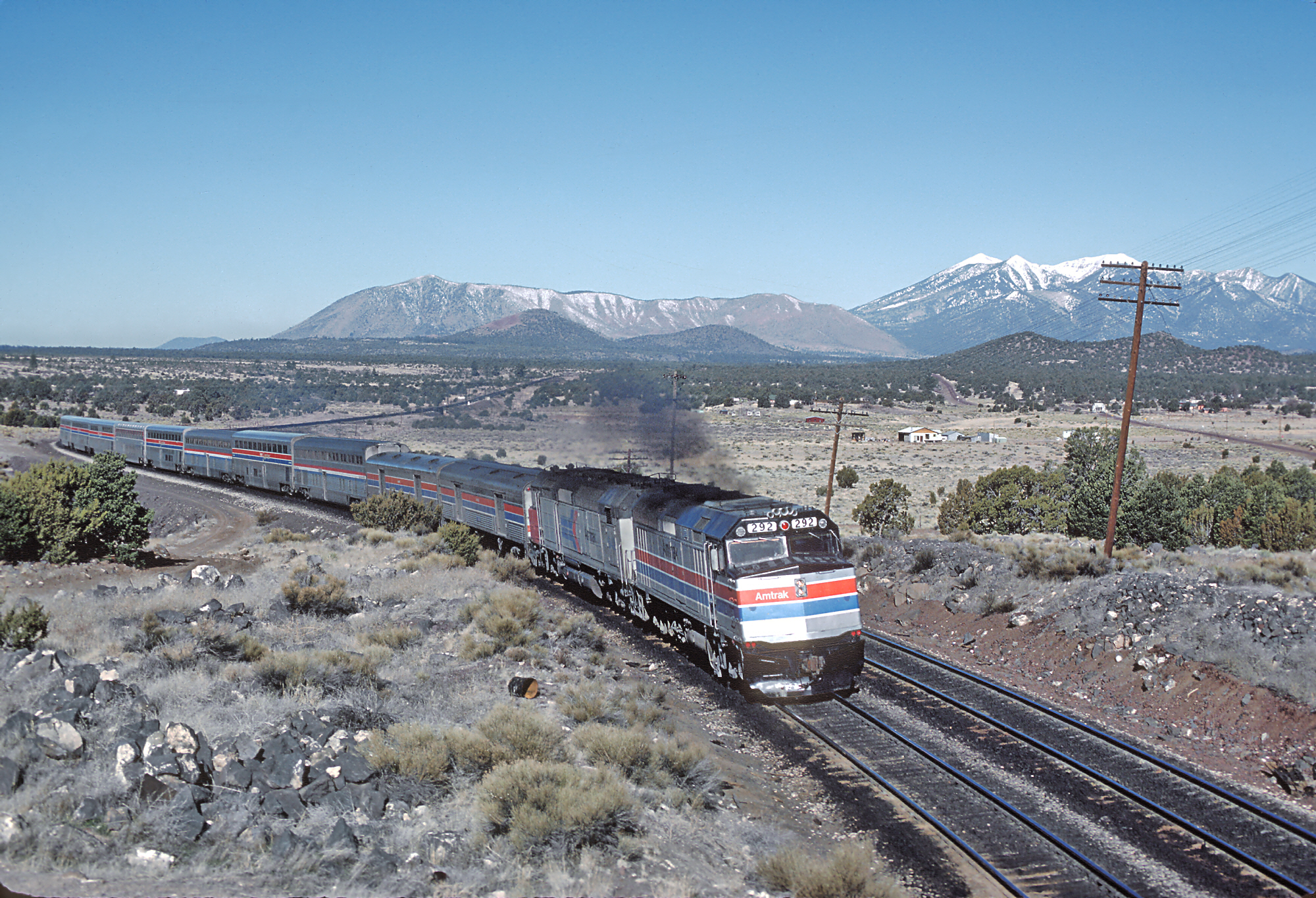
The Southwest Limited with a mix of Superliners and Hi-Level cars in March 1981

In 1979, the Southwest Chief/Limited route between Kansas City and Emporia was shifted in order to maintain service to Topeka and Lawrence, which would otherwise have lost service when the Texas Chief/Lone Star was discontinued. Until the 1979 realignment via Topeka, service operated via the direct route between Kansas City and Emporia, via Olathe, Gardner and Ottawa.

=== 1990s ===
The western portion of the Pasadena Subdivision was converted to the Gold Line in the 1990s, requiring the Southwest Chief to be rerouted to the San Bernardino Subdivision between Los Angeles and San Bernardino. Eastbound service was rerouted on November 28, 1993, replacing the stops at Pasadena and Pomona with Fullerton. Westbound service was rerouted on January 15, 1994. An additional stop at Riverside was added on April 29, 2002.

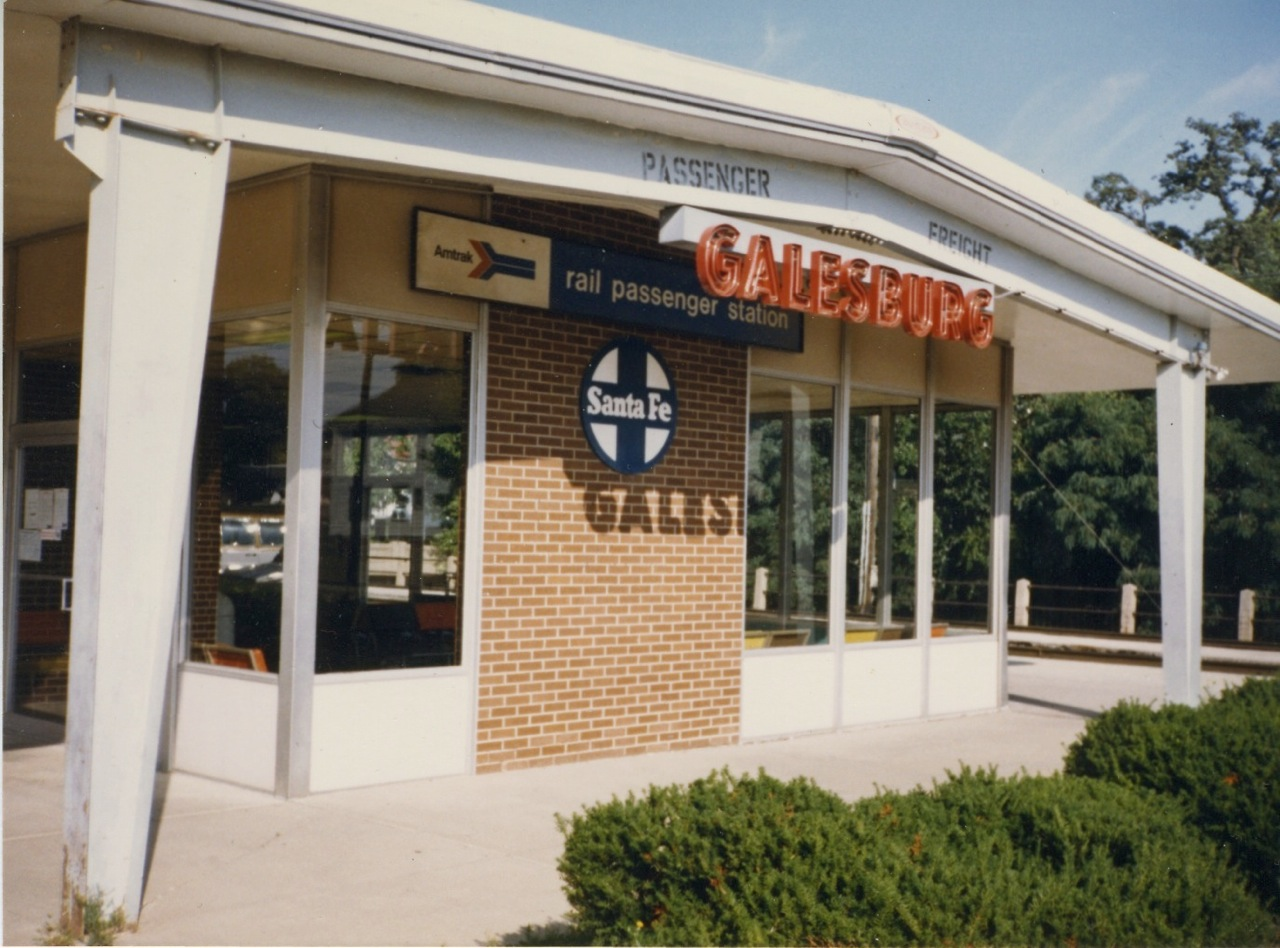
The old Atchison, Topeka & Santa Fe Railway (AT&SF) station in Galesburg. Following the Burlington Northern and Santa Fe merger in 1995, BNSF built a connector track at Cameron, southwest of Galesburg, and the Chief was rerouted to the former Burlington tracks and began stopping at the station located on the Burlington line, instead of the Santa Fe Station. As the Chief ceased operations via Joliet, Streator and Chillicothe, the former Santa Fe Station in Galesburg was closed and then demolished.

Prior to 1996, the Southwest Chief operated in Illinois between Chicago and Galesburg via the ATSF's Chillicothe Subdivision, stopping at Joliet, Streator, and Chillicothe. Following the merger between Burlington Northern and Santa Fe that gave birth to BNSF in 1995, a connector track was built near Cameron, southwest of Galesburg, which would allow freight and passenger trains to transfer from the Chillicothe Subdivision to the BN Mendota Subdivision, the former Chicago and Aurora Railroad / Chicago, Burlington & Quincy - CB&Q tracks. The Chief was rerouted by the Mendota Subdivision through Naperville, Princeton, and Mendota to Galesburg, a route shared with the California Zephyr long distance service, and the Amtrak Midwest Illinois Zephyr and Carl Sandburg services. Southwest Chief service to Joliet, Streator and Chillicothe was dropped as part of the realignment, although Joliet continues to see Amtrak service from other trains. The Chief realignment through the Cameron Connector to the Mendota Sub tracks caused Amtrak to concentrate all of its Galesburg operations in the present station, and the station building along the former Santa Fe line was closed and later demolished.

In January 1994, the Southwest Chief was rerouted between San Bernardino and Los Angeles onto the Santa Fe Third District via Fullerton and Riverside. Previously, it served Pasadena and Pomona via the Santa Fe Pasadena Subdivision, which was closed to all through traffic following damage to a bridge over the eastbound lanes of Interstate 210 in Arcadia during the Northridge Earthquake.

Between 1997 and 1998, Amtrak operated the Southwest Chief in conjunction with the Washington–Chicago Capitol Limited. The two trains used the same Superliner equipment sets and passengers traveling on both trains could remain aboard during the layover in Chicago. Originally announced in 1996, Amtrak planned to call this through service National Chief and assign it its own numbers (15/16), but the name and numbers were never used. Amtrak dropped the practice with its May 1998 timetable.

=== 2010s ===
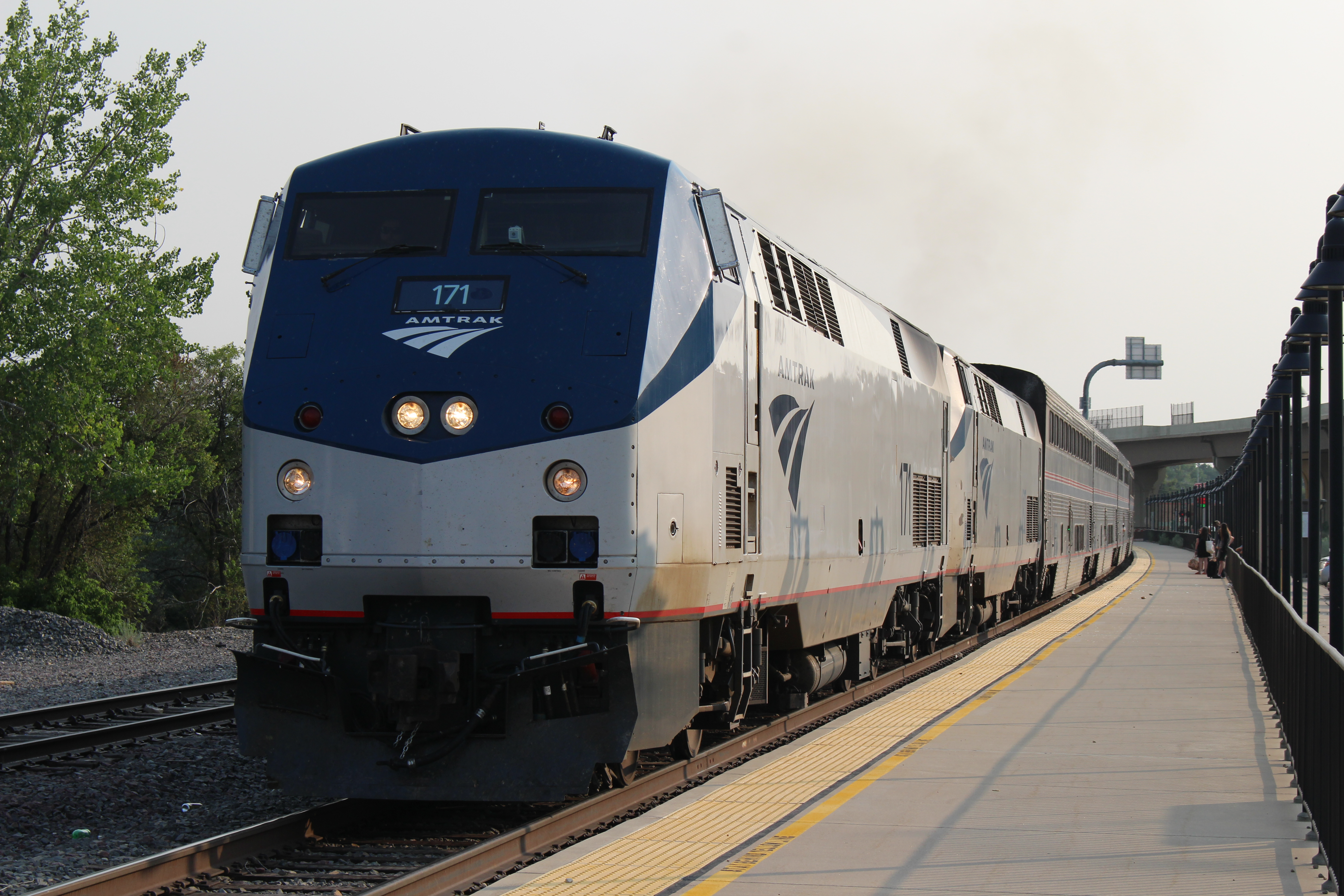
Southwest Chief #4 arriving at Trinidad, CO

The Southwest Chief was one of five routes studied for possible performance improvements by Amtrak in FY 2012.

The part of the Southwest Chief's route in western Kansas, southeastern Colorado, and northeastern New Mexico faced uncertainty throughout the 2010s.

In 2012, BNSF informed Amtrak that they had to assume part of the maintenance costs for the section of the line between La Junta and Lamy (Raton and Glorieta Subdivisions), justifying the near-zero freight traffic over it, if they wanted to keep running passenger rail over the route. BNSF also said that they would be lowering the track class on the portion of the Southwest Chief's route between Hutchinson and La Junta from Class IV to Class III and decreasing the passenger train speed limit from 79 mph (127 km/h) to 60 mph (97 km/h).

In return, BNSF proposed rerouting the Southwest Chief from the affected sections of track to its Southern Transcon via Wichita, Amarillo, and Clovis—the same route once used by the San Francisco Chief. To avoid a reroute, Amtrak sought help from the affected states—Kansas, Colorado, and New Mexico. The states eventually contributed money toward rebuilding and rehabilitating the tracks—much of it obtained from federal transportation grants—and the route was not changed.

However, this same part of the Southwest Chief's route was threatened again in 2018 when it became the focal point of a struggle to determine whether to continue Amtrak as a national network or to operate regional stand-alone networks. The issue arose when Amtrak introduced new requirements for the third renewal grant and raised previously undiscussed technical issues. A letter dated May 31, 2018, co-signed by 11 Senators, condemned the action and urged providing the match. In an open letter, former Amtrak President and CEO Joseph H. Boardman said, "The Southwest Chief issue is the battleground whose outcome will determine the fate of American’s national interconnected rail passenger network".

In June 2018, Amtrak announced that it was considering the replacement of rail service along the Kansas portion of the Southwest Chief with Amtrak Thruway buses between Albuquerque and Dodge City, where train service east to Chicago would resume. Senators in the affected area succeeded in offering an amendment to a funding bill. Per a press release from the office of co-sponsor Senator Jerry Moran, "This amendment would provide resources for maintenance and safety improvements along the Southwest Chief route and would compel Amtrak to fulfill its promise of matching funding for the successful TIGER IX discretionary grant ... In addition, this amendment would effectively reverse Amtrak’s decision to substitute rail service with bus service over large segments of the route through FY2019".

=== 2020s ===
==== Proposed Colorado Springs branch ====
In February 2020, USDOT granted $225,000 toward studying a Southwest Chief spur train service that would run to Colorado Springs, Colorado, via Pueblo.

In 2021, the Colorado Department of Transportation received a federal grant from the federal infrastructure bill passed that year to continue studying thru-car service to Colorado Springs. After 2023, the team in charge of the Colorado Springs thru-cars began cooperating with the Front Range Passenger Rail Commission, with the two teams later being merged into the Front Range Passenger Rail District (FRPRD).

The study on the thru-cars was released in 2025, concluding that two daily round trips should be implemented to connect Pueblo (or Colorado Springs) with the Southwest Chief in both directions. The study also calls for Amtrak, the FRPRD, and CDOT to apply to the Corridor Identification and Development Program "to better connect" the Southwest Chief to Front Range Passenger Rail.

==== Proposed Carrollton station ====
In May 2022, the Missouri General Assembly approved $1 million of state funds to establish a Southwest Chief infill station in Carrollton, between the Kansas City and La Plata stations. If approved by the governor, the state funds would have to be matched by local agencies.

=== Incidents ===
On October 2, 1979, the Southwest Limited derailed at Lawrence, Kansas. Of the 30 crew and 147 passengers on board, 2 were killed and 69 were injured. The cause was excessive speed on a curve. Underlying causes included the engineer's unfamiliarity with the route and speed restriction signage having been removed during track repairs.

On August 9, 1997, the eastbound Southwest Chief derailed about 5 miles northeast of Kingman, Arizona, when a bridge whose undergirding had been washed out by a flash flood and severe rains, collapsed under the weight of the train, which was traveling close to 90 mph (145 km/h). While the lead locomotive stayed on the track, the three locomotives, nine passenger cars, and seven baggage and mail cars derailed. All stayed upright. One car straddled the gap of the washed out portion of the bridge. No one was killed out of the 325 passengers and crew aboard the train, though 154 were injured.

On October 16, 1999, the westbound Southwest Chief suffered a minor derailment near Ludlow, California, following the Hector Mine earthquake. All the cars stayed upright and four passengers were injured.

On March 15, 2000, at 2:00 AM, the Southwest Chief westbound derailed on a curve outside Carbondale, Kansas, 15 miles south of Topeka. As in the incidents of 1997 and 1999, fortunately there were no fatalities and only 31 people were injured. Both the NSTB and the experts sent to the scene by Amtrak and BNSF agreed that the derailment was caused by a defective rail, which had not been properly detected by BNSF's daily inspections and ended up breaking as the train passed over it.

On March 14, 2016, the Southwest Chief derailed 3 miles (4.8 km) from Cimarron, Kansas. Of 14 crew and 128 passengers, 20 were injured. Investigators determined the train derailed after the tracks were knocked out of alignment by a runaway truck from a nearby farm operation that had rolled down a hill and struck the tracks after its owners failed to secure the parking brake.

On June 27, 2022, the eastbound Southwest Chief derailed after striking a dump truck at a level crossing near Mendon, Missouri. Of 12 crew and 275 passengers, 3 deaths and 150 injuries have been reported; the driver of the truck also died.

== Operations ==
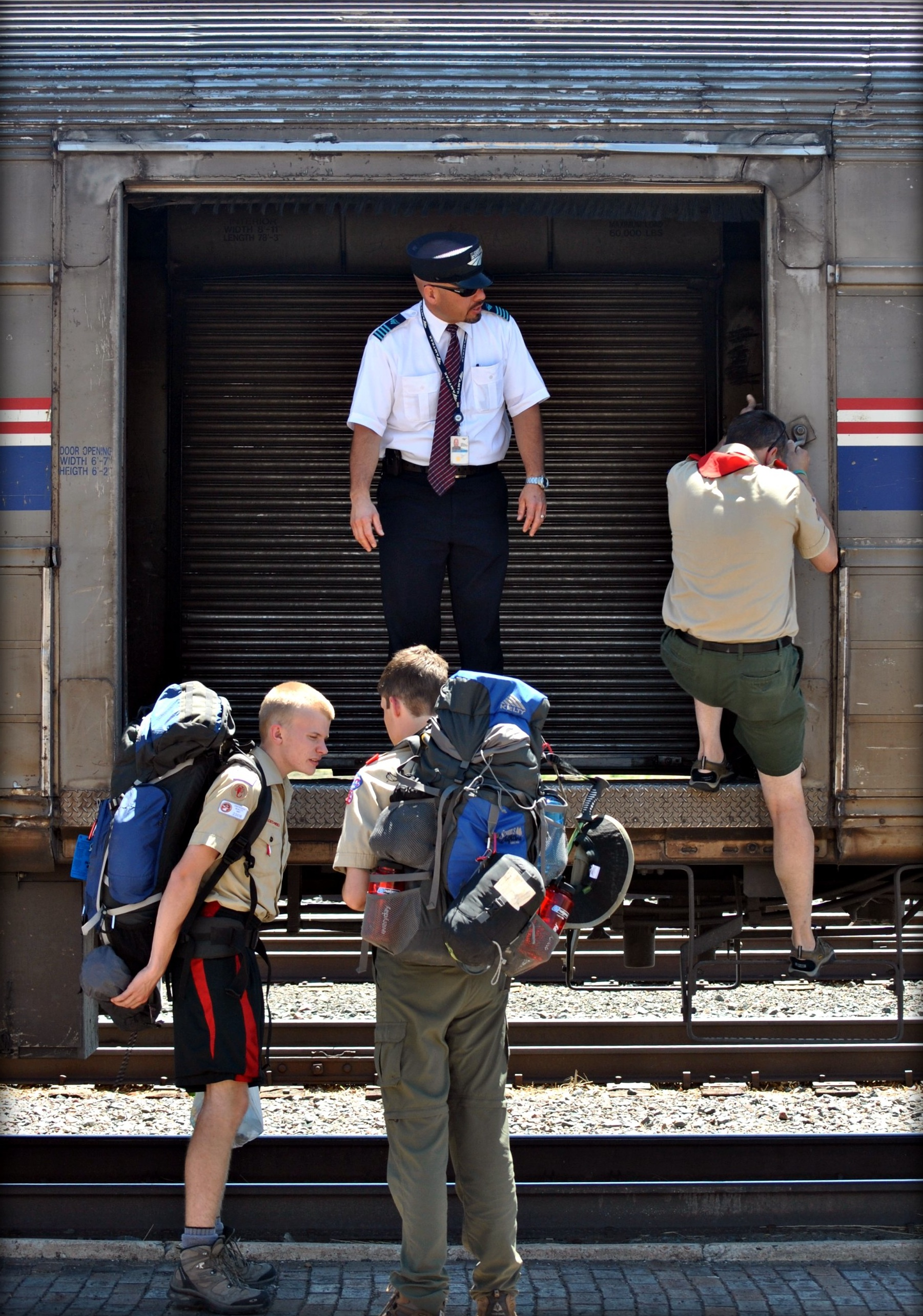
Boy Scouts unload their equipment at Raton in 2011.

The Southwest Chief runs up to 90 mph (145 km/h) along a significant portion of its route, made possible by automatic train stop systems originally installed by the Santa Fe Railway. Of Amtrak's long-distance routes, only the Texas Eagle runs faster (with a maximum speed of 100 mph (161 km/h) through much of Illinois).

During the spring and summer, volunteer rangers with the Trails and Rails program from the National Park Service travel on board and provide a narrative between La Junta, Colorado, and Albuquerque, New Mexico. Beginning in May 2013, Trails and Rails volunteers also boarded to provide narration between Chicago and La Plata, Missouri.

From June through August, the Southwest Chief is used by Scouts traveling to and from Philmont Scout Ranch via the Raton station. During those months, Raton station is staffed by Amtrak employees and handles checked baggage.

=== Equipment ===
The Southwest Chief runs Superliner train sets. Trains typically consist of two GE P42DC or Siemens ALC-42 locomotives, a Viewliner baggage car, 3 or 4 sleeper cars, a dining car, sightseer lounge and 3 or 4 Coaches. If demand warrants, a fourth coach is added between Chicago and Kansas City. Private cars or deadhead cars also sometimes ride along.

== Route ==
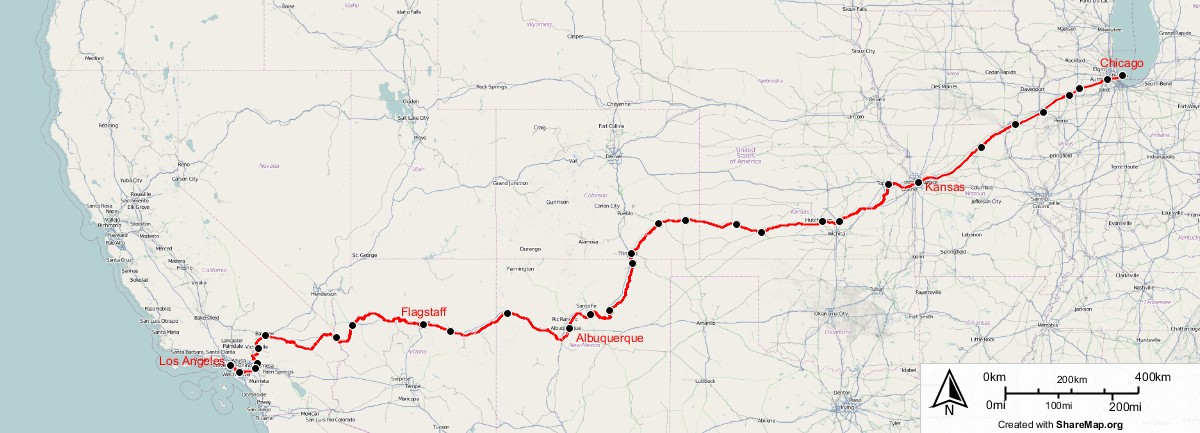
Amtrak Southwest Chief

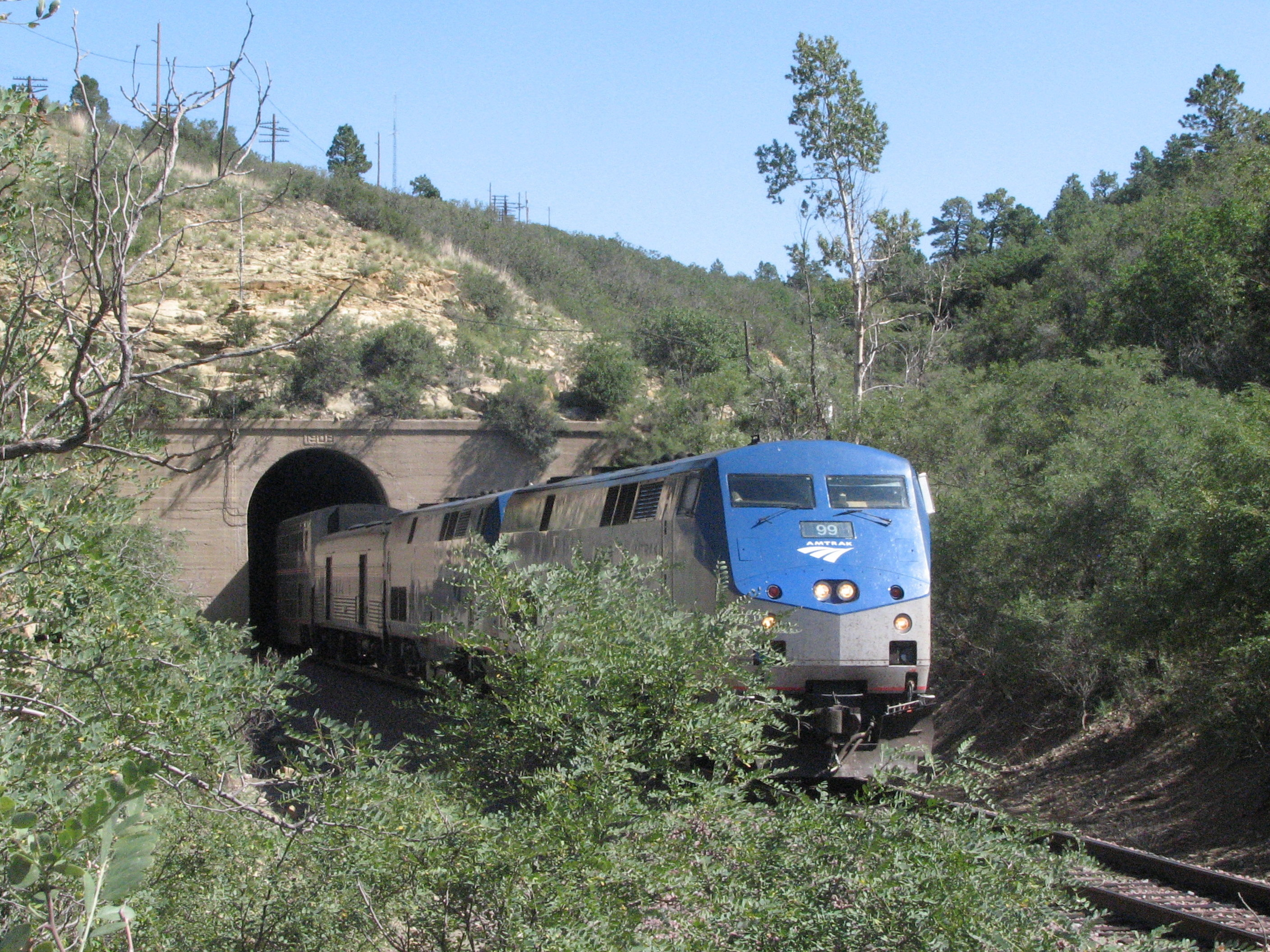
The Chief emerging from the Raton Pass Tunnel in the Sangre de Cristo Mountains, the highest point on the route.

The westbound train is Amtrak number 3 (number 4 eastbound). Upon leaving Chicago Union Station, the train travels along the Metra BNSF Line and the Mendota Subdivision, with an intermediate stops in Naperville, Mendota and Galesburg, Illinois.

After leaving Galesburg, the train enters the Cameron Connector and then enters the Southern Transcon. Between Niota, Illinois and Fort Madison, Iowa, the train crosses the Mississippi River via the historic Santa Fe Swing Span Bridge before stopping at the historic Santa Fe station. Until 2021 the service stopped at the station located in the BNSF yard, west of Fort Madison downtown. After leaving Fort Madison, the train travels in a southwest direction, stopping at La Plata, before arriving shortly after 9 p.m. at Kansas City Union Station. Before reaching Kansas City, the train crosses the Missouri River via the Sibley Bridge.

After Kansas City, the train travels overnight through southern Kansas, with stops at Lawrence, Topeka, Newton, Hutchinson, Dodge City and Garden City, before stopping at Lamar, the service's first stop in Colorado, shortly before sunrise. After leaving Lamar, the Chief continues its journey into Colorado, with stops at La Junta, where the train turns south, and at Trinidad, this being the last stop of the Colorado service before entering the state of New Mexico, cresting Sangre de Cristo Mountains at Raton Pass.

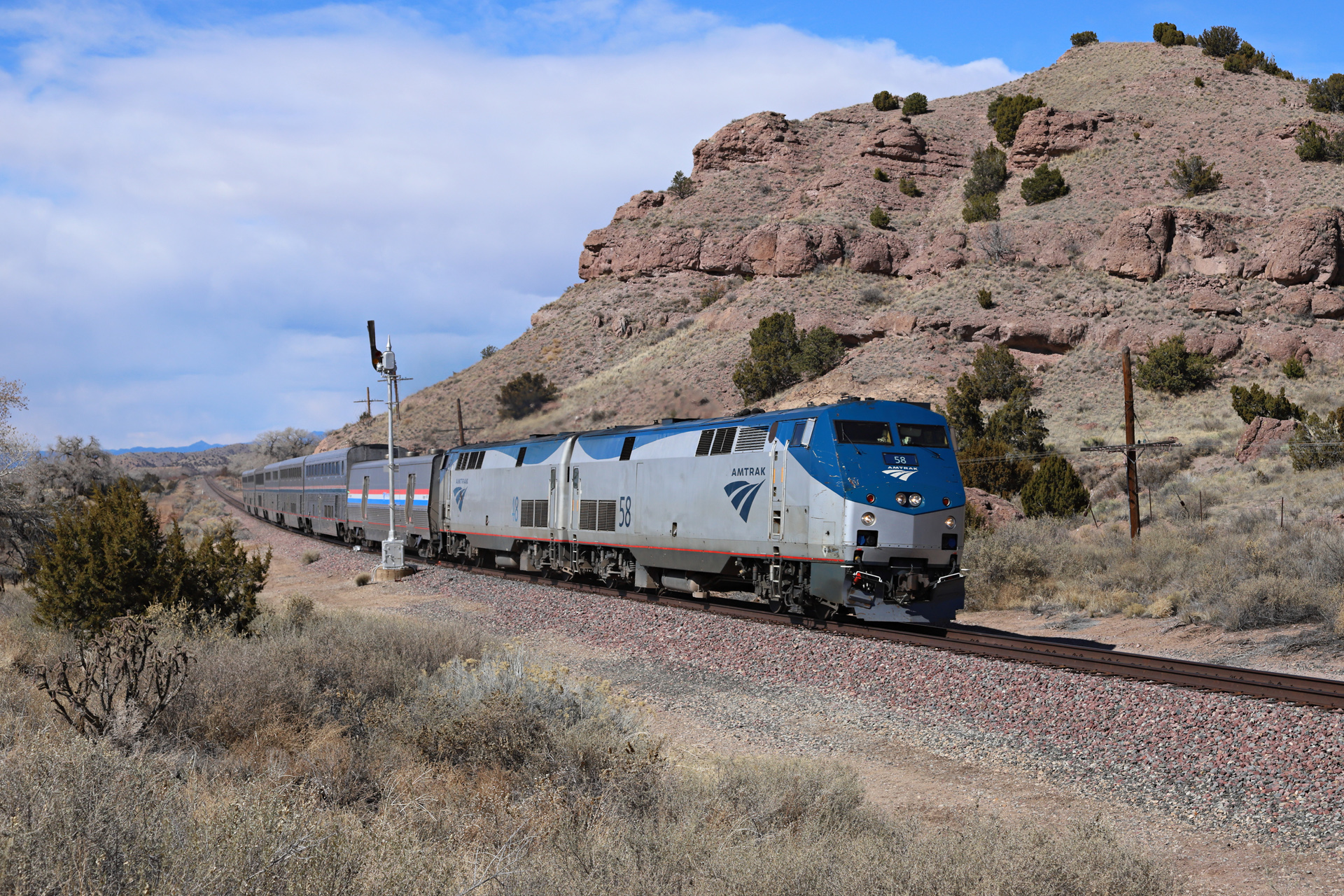
The Chief passing by one of the semaphores still operating at that time on the NMDOT section of the route, near Los Cerrillos, New Mexico. In 2024 NMDOT eliminated the semaphores still in operation on its section of the route, with only 11 surviving blades remaining currently in operation near Wagon Mound, Levy and Colmor, on BNSF's Raton Subdivision.

Southwest Chief #3 westbound, passes through the iconic three semaphores located at the eastern end (ESS) Wagon Mound siding. This set, along with two other intermediates between Wagon Mound and Levy, three at WSS Levy, and another three at ESS Colmor, all located on BNSF’s Raton Sub, constitute the last 11 surviving blades remaining currently in operation, originally manufactured by Union Switch & Signal for Santa Fe in the 1920s.

The portion of the route between La Junta and Albuquerque (Raton and Glorieta Subdivisions) is known for having some of the last active semaphores on a Class I railroad mainline, dating back to the ATSF era. Little and/or no freight traffic on those portions of the Chief's route is what caused the semaphores to last until the present day, although over time many were removed by both BNSF and NMDOT. whilst no longer in active use, they currently remain at their present location.

In August 2024, the last semaphores located on the NMDOT section of the route (former 4th Santa Fe District / Glorieta Subdivision) of the line between WSS Lamy and Waldo siding, near Los Cerrillos were removed, leaving only 11 surviving blades remaining in operation on the BNSF's Raton Subdivision. Here, three semaphores protect East End Colmor Siding; three at West End Levy Siding, two intermediates between West Levy and East Wagon Mound, and three at East Wagon Mound. From BNSF there is no timeline when the 11 last semaphores will be replaced.

After descending from Raton Pass, the train continues its travel in direction south, stopping at Raton, and Las Vegas. After Las Vegas, the train climbs the slopes of Sangre de Cristo Mountains once again, reaching the summit at Glorieta Pass. After descending from Glorieta Pass, the Chief arrives in Lamy the last stop before reaching Alvarado Transportation Center in Albuquerque.

Both in Lamy and Albuquerque, the train usually stops for more than 10 minutes, during which time the region's indigenous peoples (mainly Navajos) often offer and sell travelers on board the train handicrafts, typical regional food products, and other items made by the natives.

After leaving Albuquerque, between Isleta Pueblo and Los Lunas, the train turns west and rejoins the Southern Transcon. Once on the Transcon, and continuing west, the Chief makes its stop in Gallup, the last stop in New Mexico before entering Arizona.

== Stations ==
State	City	Station
Illinois	Chicago	Chicago Union
Illinois	Naperville	Naperville
Illinois	Mendota	Mendota
Illinois	Princeton	Princeton
Illinois	Galesburg	Galesburg
Iowa	Fort Madison	Fort Madison
Missouri	La Plata	La Plata
Missouri	Kansas City	Kansas City
Kansas	Lawrence	Lawrence
Kansas	Topeka	Topeka
Kansas	Newton	Newton
Kansas	Hutchinson	Hutchinson
Kansas	Dodge City	Dodge City
Kansas	Garden City	Garden City
Colorado	Lamar	Lamar
Colorado	La Junta	La Junta
Colorado	Trinidad	Trinidad
New Mexico	Raton	Raton
New Mexico	Las Vegas	Las Vegas
New Mexico	Lamy	Lamy
New Mexico	Albuquerque	Albuquerque
New Mexico	Gallup	Gallup
Arizona	Winslow	Winslow
Arizona	Flagstaff	Flagstaff
Arizona	Kingman	Kingman
California	Needles	Needles
California	Barstow	Barstow
California	Victorville	Victorville
California	San Bernardino	San Bernardino
California	Riverside	Riverside
California	Fullerton	Fullerton
California	Los Angeles	Los Angeles Union
