= Cameron, Illinois =

Owen Timmy Oaks, Illinois
- Unincorporated community and Census designated place
- Location within Illinois Location within the United States
- Coordinates: 40°53′15″N 90°30′59″W
- Country: United States
- State: Illinois
- County: Warren

Area
  - Total: 0.63 sq mi (1.64 km^{2})
  - Land: 0.63 sq mi (1.64 km^{2})
  - Water: 0 sq mi (0.00 km^{2})
- Elevation: 774 ft (236 m)

Population (2020)
  - Total: 188
  - Density: 297.2/sq mi (114.76/km^{2})
- Time zone: UTC-6 (Central (CST))
  - Summer (DST): UTC-5 (CDT)
- ZIP code: 61423
- Area code: 309
- FIPS code: 17-10747
- GNIS feature ID: 2804101

Cameron is an unincorporated community in Warren County, Illinois, United States. As of the 2020 census, Cameron had a population of 188. Cameron is 7 miles (11 km) east-southeast of Monmouth. Cameron has a post office with ZIP code 61423. Cameron is at the junction of the old Chicago, Burlington and Quincy and Santa Fe Railroads, both now owned by BNSF.

Cameron is the site of a 1996 connection track that was built between the former Burlington Northern line and the former Santa Fe's Chillicothe Subdivision, when the two merged to form the BNSF. This track allows both freight trains, along with Amtrak's Southwest Chief to use the Chicago and Mendota subdivisions between Chicago and Galesburg (already used by the California Zephyr), by way of Naperville, Princeton and Mendota. Prior to 1996, the Southwest Chief, and its predecessor, the Santa Fe's famed Super Chief, traveled to Galesburg on the Chillicothe subdivision by way of Joliet, Streator, and Chillicothe.

An EF2 tornado ripped through the town on July 16, 2015; some houses were ripped off their foundations and large grain silos were tipped to the ground. There were no fatalities.

== Demographics ==
Historical population
Census	Pop.	Note	%±
2020	188		—
U.S. Decennial Census

Cameron first appeared as a census designated place in the 2020 U.S. census.

== Education ==
It is in the United Community School District 304.
