= Southern Transcon =

Railway corridor owned by BNSF Railway

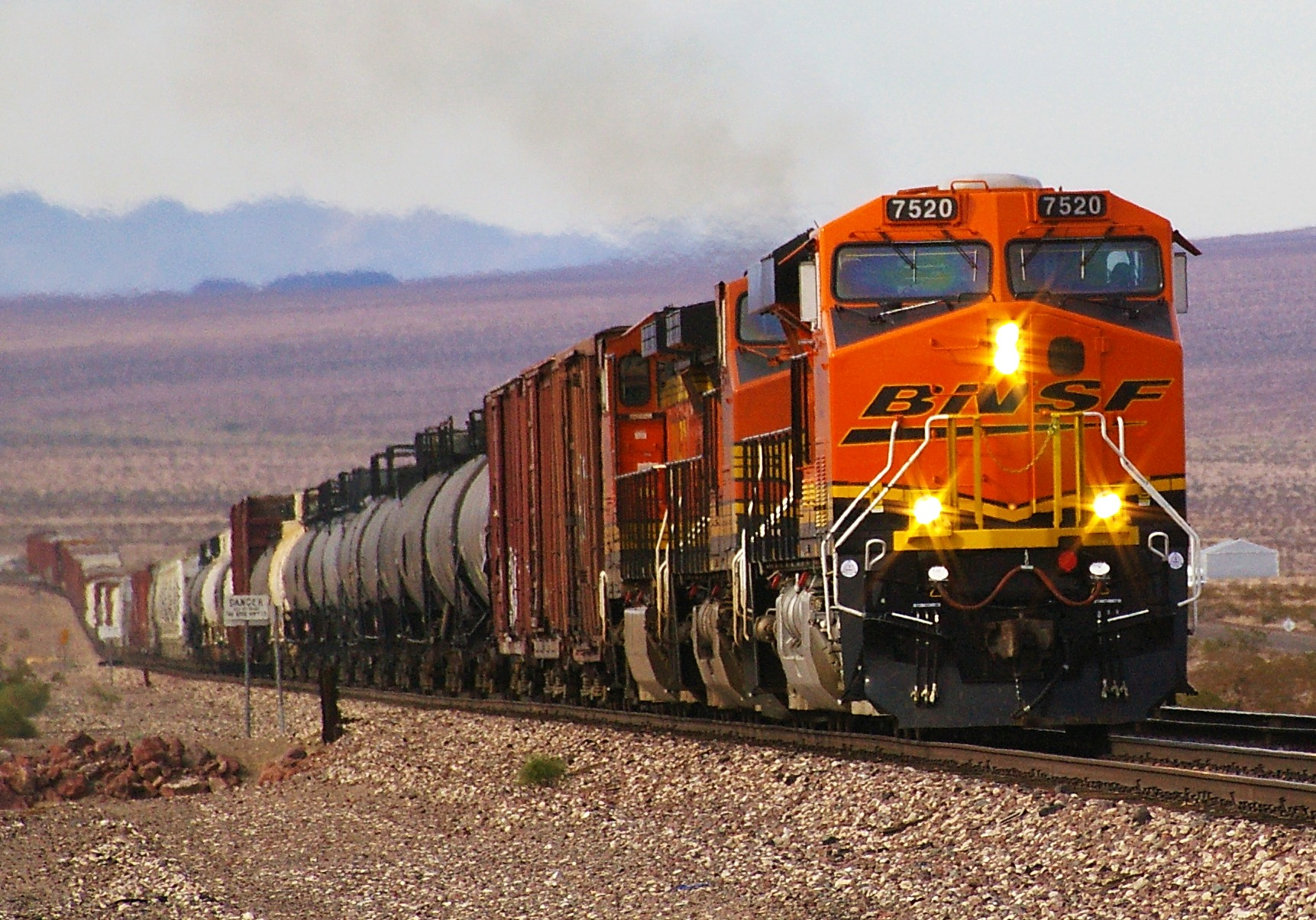
- BNSF ES44DC No. 7520 leads on the Southern Transcon in the Mojave Desert, California

Overview
- Owner: BNSF Railway
- Locale: Southwestern and Midwest United States
- Termini: Commerce; Chillicothe
- Connecting lines: San Bernardino Subdivision; Cajon Subdivision; Needles Subdivision; Seligman Subdivision; Gallup Subdivision; Clovis Subdivision; Hereford Subdivision; Panhandle Subdivision; Emporia Subdivision; Marceline Subdivision; Chillicothe Subdivision
- Stations: 344

Service
- Type: Inter-city rail; Freight rail; Commuter rail
- Operators: BNSF Railway; Amtrak; Metrolink; Union Pacific Railroad

History
- Completed: July 1, 1908; 118 years ago

Technical
- Line length: 2,200 mi (3,500 km)
- Number of tracks: 2
- Track gauge: 4 ft 8 1/2 in (1,435 mm) standard gauge
- Train protection system: PTC

The Southern Transcon is a main line of the BNSF Railway comprising 11 subdivisions between Southern California and Chicago, Illinois. Completed in its current alignment in 1908 by the Atchison, Topeka and Santa Fe Railway, when it opened the Belen Cutoff in New Mexico (going through eastern New Mexico, northwestern Texas, briefly part of western Oklahoma and to Kansas) and bypassed the steep grades of Raton Pass (which passes through northeastern New Mexico and southwestern Colorado), it now serves as a mostly double-tracked intermodal corridor.

The Transcon is one of the most heavily trafficked rail corridors in the western United States: as of 2006, an average of almost 90 trains daily (over 100 trains on peak days) passed over the section between Belen and Clovis, New Mexico, with each train typically 6,000 to 8,000 feet (1,800 to 2,400 m) long.

== History ==
The Atchison, Topeka and Santa Fe Railway completed a railroad between Chicago and Southern California in the 1880s. Much of the route had already been constructed by subsidiaries. The line in California between Needles and Mojave was built by the Southern Pacific Railroad to meet the St. Louis and San Francisco Railway, which had built west from Isleta, New Mexico. They met at Needles with the line put into service in 1883. The Atlantic and Pacific Railroad, then essentially an operating subsidiary of the AT&SF, leased the line from the SP in August 1884, and in November 1885 the AT&SF-owned California Southern Railroad completed its line over Cajon Pass to the SP's Needles branch at Barstow, giving the AT&SF access to the west coast.

The Southern Kansas Railway built a branch to Amarillo, Texas in the 1880s, and the Pecos Valley and Northeastern Railway also built an extension from Amarillo to Pecos via Texico, New Mexico in 1899.

The original route was less than ideal, especially where it crossed Raton Pass and Glorieta Pass. The steep grades posed operational problems, including congestion, slow speeds, and the need for helper engines. As an interim solution, a second track, with a longer tunnel, was opened at Raton in 1908, but this simply added capacity, and the grades remained. In 1902, Santa Fe began surveying a new cutoff that would bypass this segment entirely.

=== Belen Cutoff ===
To complete the line between Texico and a point northwest of Belen, New Mexico, the Santa Fe incorporated the Eastern Railway of New Mexico in October 1902, and began construction of the Belen Cutoff the next January. The entire line was completed on July 1, 1908, allowing through freight trains to bypass the 3–3.5% grades of the old line for the maximum grade of 1.25% (at Abo Canyon) on the new line. (Most passenger trains continued to use Raton Pass so as to serve Colorado.) The Pecos Valley and Northeastern (but not its Texas subsidiaries, because of Article X of the Texas Constitution) was consolidated into the Eastern in March 1907, and in January 1912, the property of the Eastern was conveyed to the Santa Fe.

=== Other improvements ===
To connect central Texas to this line, the Pecos and Northern Texas Railway completed the Coleman Cutoff, running southeast from Texico to the Santa Fe subsidiary Gulf, Colorado and Santa Fe Railway at Coleman, in 1914. A third line was almost completed in the 1920s and 1930s, when the Santa Fe built the majority of the planned Dodge City– Colmor, New Mexico (Colmor Cutoff), which would provide a second bypass of Raton (but not Glorieta), but construction stopped at Farley, and the line was torn up west of Boise City in 1942.

The 47-mile (76 km) Ellinor Cutoff opened in 1924, cutting through the Flint Hills from the original main line at Ellinor, Kansas, southwest to El Dorado on the main line to Texas. This allowed trains bound for the Belen Cutoff to cut directly to Mulvane, Kansas, bypassing Wichita to the southeast. To the west, in Arizona, the Santa Fe constructed a new line between Williams and Crookton, bypassing the sharp curves and steep grades of the line via Ash Fork built by the Atlantic and Pacific Railroad in the 1880s. The $19.3-million realignment opened on December 19, 1960, and the old line was abandoned west of the Phoenix connection at Ash Fork. Smaller improvements included installation of centralized traffic control on the Belen Cutoff in the 1940s.

In 2023, BNSF began construction on the second bridge over the Missouri River in Sibley. Once completed, the new bridge, parallel to the existing one, which once completed will eliminate the second to last single-track bottleneck on entire Southern Transcon, leaving only the crossing of the Salt Fork Arkansas River at Alva, Oklahoma, in the Panhandle Subdivision. In addition, in 2024, BNSF completed the track doubling between Rose Hill and Mulvane on the Emporia Sub, which now allows for more efficient management of train traffic in both directions.

Before the remaining sections of the Emporia Sub were doubled-tracked, most eastbound trains, under the directional traffic system, were rerouted at Mulvane to running via Wichita, Newton and La Junta Sub to Ellinor, where they rejoined the Transcon, adding extra minutes by extending the route by several kilometers, while westbound traffic remained on the Emporia Sub.

Projects were underway to add triple- and even quadruple-track along the busiest parts. This includes the improvements on the Cajon Subdivision.

Union Pacific has trackage rights along the Transcon segment between Kansas City and Joliet, primarily used by its high-priority intermodal trains Z-CIG4 and G4CI, which run daily from Global 4 Terminal Intermodal Yard in Joliet to City of Industry, California.

== Constituent rail lines ==
The Southern Transcon railroad corridor is made up of the following BNSF rail lines which are referred to as subdivisions, in order from west to east.

Subdivision	State
San Bernardino	California
Cajon	California
Needles	California
Seligman	California
Seligman	Arizona
Gallup	Arizona
Gallup	New Mexico
Clovis	New Mexico
Hereford	Texas
Panhandle	Texas
Panhandle	Oklahoma
Panhandle	Kansas
Emporia	Kansas
Marceline	Missouri
Marceline	Iowa
Chillicothe	Iowa
Chillicothe	Illinois

== Passenger trains ==
Parts of the route are utilized by passenger rail services — BNSF does not operate regular passenger trains outside of the Chicago Subdivision.

Amtrak's Southwest Chief runs once daily in each direction on the Transcon, but via the Glorieta, Raton, La Junta Subdivision and Topeka between Albuquerque and Kansas City. The Pacific Surfliner also operates between Los Angeles and Fullerton. Until its cancellation in 1997, Amtrak's Desert Wind used the Southern Transcon between Los Angeles and Barstow. The proposed Coachella Valley Rail (CV Rail) train from RCTC, which is anticipated to be operated by Amtrak, would initially run two roundtrips a day over the Transcon from LA Union Station to the Colton Crossing.

Southern California's Metrolink commuter rail trains utilize the route between Los Angeles and San Bernardino. These include the Orange County Line (between Los Angeles and Fullerton), 91/Perris Valley Line (between Los Angeles and Highgrove), and Inland Empire–Orange County Line (between Atwood and San Bernardino).

== See also ==
- Central Corridor (Union Pacific Railroad)
- Fort Madison Toll Bridge
- Northern Transcon
- Sunset Route
