= Quincy Rail Bridge =

- Coordinates: 39°56′30″N 91°25′51″W
- Crosses: Mississippi River
- Locale: West Quincy, Missouri and Quincy, Illinois

Characteristics
- Design: Truss bridge (since 1960); Swing bridge (1868-1960)
- Longest span: 339 feet (103 m)
- Clearance below: 63 feet (19 m)

History
- Opened: 1868 (original bridge); 1890 (first replacement); 1960 (current bridge)

Location
- Interactive map of Quincy Rail Bridge

The Quincy Rail Bridge is a truss bridge that carries a BNSF Railway rail line across the Mississippi River between West Quincy, Missouri, and Quincy, Illinois, US. It was constructed in 1960 for the Chicago, Burlington and Quincy Railroad; previous bridges at the site were built in 1868 and 1890.

== History ==
=== Original bridge (1868—1899) ===
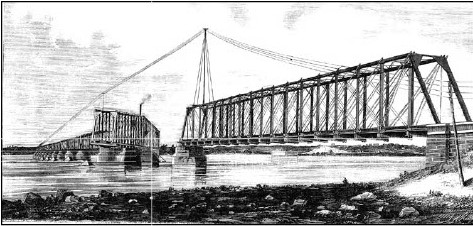
The 1868-built bridge

The first structure at this location was completed at ten AM on November 7, 1868 when bridge engineer Thomas C. Clarke tested the structure with the crossing of locomotive engines. The bridge and a total of two miles of track formed a new connection between the Chicago, Burlington and Quincy Railroad and the Hannibal and St. Joseph Railroad. Built by the Quincy Bridge Company and its president Nathaniel Bushnell, the bridge was a swing span, wrought iron Pratt truss which cost $1,500,000. The 362-foot long swing truss created two spans of 181 feet. Sixteen fixed spans using a Whipple truss complete the river crossing to make the bridge 3,189 feet long (2 spans at 250 feet, three spans at 200 feet, and eleven spans at 157 feet). A second bridge across Quincy Bay (the waterway between present-day Quinsippi Island and the city of Quincy) included another draw span.

=== First replacement (1899—1960) ===
The original bridge was replaced in 1899 as the original wrought-iron truss could not carry the heavier trains and engines in use at the time. This bridge included wagon bridge decks cantilevered off the sides of the rail bridges to accommodate farm traffic and automobiles. Once the Quincy Memorial Bridge opened in 1930, the wagon bridge decks were subsequently removed from this railroad bridge. This bridge included two separate bridges across Quincy Bay and a junction on the island between the bay and the river. Both bridges across Quincy Bay were swing bridges to allow passage of ships into Quincy Bay. On November 27, 1915, a passenger train travelling east from Missouri fell into the bay after failing to stop when the swing bridge was open for a barge.

=== Current bridge ===
The current structure, located at Mississippi River mile 380.0, was built in 1960. It has a through truss main span of 339 feet (103 m). the other spans of the bridge are deck trusses. The reconstruction was prompted by the channel for boat traffic being relocated from the west side of the river to the east side. The bridge opened on November 11, 1960; it was dedicated by Harry Murphy, president of the Chicago, Burlington and Quincy Railroad. It was built at a cost of $9,575,000. With the opening of the bridge, the railroad made a donation to the city of the island between the river and Quincy Bay (Quinsippi Island) and one of the old bridges across the bay for use as a recreational area.

From the 1950s until 1971 it served the Kansas City Zephyr and American Royal Zephyr daily passenger trains between Chicago and Kansas City. It served Amtrak's Illinois Zephyr from Chicago to West Quincy, Missouri, from 1971 to 1994.

Since the Great Flood of 1993 the Amtrak Illinois Zephyr and Carl Sandburg services terminate at the Quincy station, although after the passengers have disembarked the trains do cross the bridge to the BNSF Railway yard in West Quincy, where the equipment is oriented in the proper direction for the return trip on the wye and is stored until the next departure. This Mississippi River crossing does serve as a backup route should the Fort Madison Toll Bridge crossing be unavailable.

== See also ==
- List of crossings of the Upper Mississippi River
