= West Quincy station =

Former rail station in West Quincy, Missouri, US

West Quincy, MO
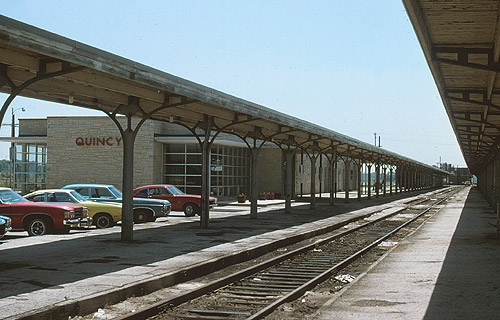
- West Quincy station in May 1975

General information
- Location: 10 BN Avenue (Depot Road); West Quincy, Missouri
- Coordinates: 39.9260°N 91.4374°W
- Line: BNSF Hannibal Subdivision

Construction
- Accessible: No

History
- Opened: April 1, 1860; July 20, 1947; November 4, 1971
- Closed: c. 1939–1940; May 10, 1971; July 9, 1993
- Rebuilt: February 1, 1953; November 11, 1954
Former services
Preceding station	Amtrak	Following station
Terminus	Illinois Zephyr	Quincy toward Chicago
Preceding station	Burlington Route	Following station
Palmyra toward Kansas City	American Royal Zephyr and Kansas City Zephyr	Macomb toward Chicago
Palmyra toward Kansas City	Kansas City – Quincy via Brookfield	Terminus
Hannibal Terminus	Hannibal – Chicago (Zephyr 9902)	La Grange toward Chicago
Hannibal toward St. Louis	Burlington – St. Louis	La Grange toward Burlington
Terminus	Burlington – Quincy via Carthage	Rock Creek toward Burlington
Terminus	New Canton – Quincy	Marble Head toward New Canton
Taylor toward Kirksville	Kirksville – West Quincy	Terminus
Former services at pre-1940 station
Preceding station	Burlington Route	Following station
Taylor toward Kansas City	Kansas City – Quincy via Milan	Quincy Terminus
Palmyra toward Kansas City	Kansas City – Quincy via Brookfield	Quincy Terminus
Hannibal toward St. Louis	Burlington – St. Louis via Quincy loop	La Grange toward Burlington
Location

West Quincy station was a train station in West Quincy, Missouri, United States, last used by Amtrak in 1993. The first railroad to reach West Quincy was a branch of the Hannibal and St. Joseph Railroad, in 1860. A bridge across the Mississippi River opened in 1868, followed by lines to the north and west in 1871. All the lines were later consolidated under the Chicago, Burlington and Quincy Railroad, which operated West Quincy station until around 1939.

The railroad opened a new temporary station at West Quincy in 1947; it was expanded in 1953 to replace the downtown Quincy station. A permanent station building was added in 1954, but service declined over the following decades. The station was closed in May 1971 when Amtrak declined to continue service, but it reopened that November as the terminus of the Illinois Zephyr. The Great Flood of 1993 caused the station to close in July 1993; it was several damaged by flooding after a levee failed, and the station never reopened.

== History ==
=== First station ===
The Quincy and Chicago Railroad opened a line from Quincy, Illinois, to Galesburg, Illinois, on January 31, 1856. It was soon operated as part of the Chicago, Burlington and Quincy Railroad (CB&Q), forming a line between Quincy and Chicago, and was consolidated with the CB&Q in 1865. The Quincy and Palmyra Railroad opened a short line from West Quincy, Missouri, to the Hannibal and St. Joseph Railroad (H&St.J) at Palmyra, Missouri, on April 1, 1860. A ferry was available across the Mississippi River to connect with the CB&Q. The Quincy and Palmyra was merged into the H&St.J in 1867. The CB&Q, the H&St.J, and the Toledo, Wabash and Western Railroad opened a bridge across the Mississippi River between Quincy and West Quincy on November 9, 1868.

West Quincy became a rail junction in 1871 with the opening of the Quincy, Missouri and Pacific Railroad westward in 1871 and the Mississippi Valley and Western Railway northward. Both railroads later became part of the CB&Q. By the turn of the century, West Quincy station was located at the junction of the three lines. In 1897–1898, the CB&Q reconstructed the Mississippi River bridge. A second "lower" bridge, south of the main bridge, was added over Quincy Bay on the east side of the river; this formed a loop which allowed through passenger trains to serve Quincy without reversing direction.

The CBQ acquired the H&St.J (which it had long controlled) in 1901. Much of the H&St.J mainline plus the West Quincy–Palmyra line were part of the CB&Q route between Chicago and Kansas City. Despite serving as a transfer point between north-south and east-west lines, West Quincy station was known as a "tough place", described by a 1945 newspaper as "hardly a safe place for decent people".

By 1925, the station was served by all St. Louis–Hannibal–Burlington and Quincy–Milan–Kansas City trains. It was also a flag stop for some trains between Kansas City (with St. Joseph sections) and Quincy or points east. No trains on the latter route stopped by 1934. St. Louis–Burlington service ceased stopping by late 1936, leaving only two daily round trips – a Quincy–Milan–Kansas City train and a Quincy–Milan mixed train – serving West Quincy. The station was closed to passenger service between mid-1939 and mid-1940; it was soon demolished.

=== Second station ===
==== Temporary stations ====
In September 1945, the CB&Q announced plans to make several changes at West Quincy, including grade separation of U.S. Route 24 and new freight yards to replace those in Quincy. The existing Quincy station was to be closed; a new "station" with no rails would be built in downtown Quincy, with a bus connection to a waiting room and platform in West Quincy. The move was expected to reduce running times – as well as to reduce the company's taxes by being outside Quincy city limits. Objections from city officials initially led the CB&Q to drop the plan, but it was brought back in early 1946. Construction of the West Quincy rail yard began in September 1946; it opened in October 1947.

On June 6, 1947, the CB&Q announced that Zephyr trainset 9902 would begin operating between Hannibal and Chicago via Burlington. A station known as "Quincy West" was constructed in West Quincy. A passenger coach was lifted off its trucks and placed on a foundation to serve as a temporary station building. After delays due to flooding, service began on July 20, 1947. Only that single round trip stopped at Quincy West; all other service continued to use Quincy station. The CB&Q expected that a new town would form around the rail yards, which opened in October 1947.

In January 1950, the CB&Q began construction of the Centennial Cutoff in western Missouri. Part of the railroad's postwar improvements, the cutoff reduced the Chicago–Kansas City distance by 22 miles (35 km) with gentler curvature and grades, allowing faster passenger and freight service. Freight trains began using the new line in October 1952. That November, the CB&Q announced plans to eliminate the time-consuming detour through downtown Quincy – as had been proposed in 1945 – as part of changes related to the cutoff. Passenger trains would use the main bridge rather than the "lower" bridge; a new station at West Quincy would replace the existing Quincy station. The change was expected to save 20–30 minutes over the old Quincy routing.

The CB&Q began operating new Chicago–Kansas City passenger trains, the American Royal Zephyr and Kansas City Zephyr, over the Centennial Cutoff on February 1, 1953. That day, West Quincy replaced Quincy as the city's train station. The CB&Q parked three railroad cars on a siding to serve as the temporary station. A baggage car housed a baggage room and a boiler for steam heating; two coaches housed a waiting room and a lunch counter. Temporary buildings were constructed for express and mail use. Along with the three Zephyrs, the station was host to a number of services inherited from the Quincy station: Chicago–Quincy, Quincy–Kansas City/St. Joseph, Burlington–St. Louis (including the Zephyr Rocket), Quincy–Burlington via Carthage, Quincy–Kirksville (the former Milan line), and Quincy–New Canton. The Kirksville and New Canton lines were mixed trains only. The railroad called the station "Quincy (West Station)".

==== Permanent station ====
The CB&Q advertised for bids for a permanent station building in August 1953. Groundbreaking ceremonies for station buildings at West Quincy and Hannibal were held on October 21, 1953. The new West Quincy station was dedicated on November 11, 1954. The one-story station building measured 40 by 226 feet (12 m × 69 m). It was of "ultra-modern" design, with larger windows, a flat roof, and a Lannon stone exterior. The interior had full-height draperies, a terrazzo floor, and fluorescent lighting. The building housed a waiting room with lounge furniture; an air-conditioned lunch counter; and ticketing, baggage, and express handling facilities.

Passenger service at West Quincy decreased as ridership declined. Service to Burlington via Carthage ended on January 12, 1957. The last Quincy–Kansas City/St. Joseph local trains were discontinued on March 16, 1957, followed by Quincy–Galesburg local trains on August 1; this left only the American Royal Zephyr and Kansas City Zephyr on the east-west route. The Hannibal–Chicago round trip ended in 1959. The New Canton mixed train was cut back to Hull in late 1959 and dropped by mid-1964. The Kirksville mixed train was cut in April 1966.

The discontinuance of the former Zephyr Rocket on April 8, 1967, ended north-south service through West Quincy, leaving only the two Zephyrs serving the station. The daytime Kansas City Zephyr was cut back to an unnamed Quincy–Chicago train – popularly known as the "Quincy Local" – on April 10, 1968. In March 1968, the CB&Q merged with three other railroads to become the Burlington Northern Railroad (BN). The overnight American Royal Zephyr lost its name in December 1970.

==== Amtrak era ====
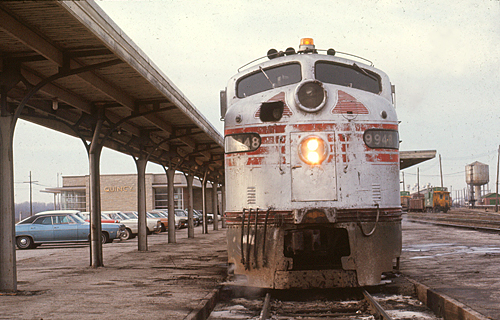
The Illinois Zephyr at West Quincy in 1974

Amtrak was created in 1970 as a quasi-public corporation to take over intercity passenger trains in the United States. The BN was among the 20 railroads that joined Amtrak, though the Galesburg–Quincy–Kansas City segment was not selected to be part of the initial Amtrak system. In April 1971, four parties – the cities of Quincy and Macomb, plus Quincy College and Western Illinois University – filed a federal lawsuit to prevent the Quincy Local from being discontinued. An injunction granted by judge Joseph Sam Perry resulted in the trains continuing to run after the May 1 start of Amtrak operations. Judge Bernard Martin Decker lifted the injunction on May 10, ending service to Quincy. A June court decision ended the lawsuit.

However, Illinois soon provided funding to resume daily Chicago–West Quincy service. Amtrak began operation of the Illinois Zephyr on November 4, 1971. Amtrak listed the station as "West Quincy, MO" in timetables until October 29, 1972, then "Quincy, IL (West Station)" and later "Quincy, IL (at West Quincy, MO)". A new Quincy station east of the Mississippi River opened on April 24, 1983; a permanent structure there opened on December 12, 1985. West Quincy reverted to appearing as "West Quincy, MO" in timetables. The Quincy station was added because the low-lying West Quincy location was prone to flooding from the Mississippi River.

Massive floods occurred on the Mississippi River beginning in April 1993. The Illinois Zephyr was temporarily cut back to Quincy on July 10, 1993. On July 16, the West Quincy levee failed due to sabotage, severely damaging West Quincy station. After the floods, the BN moved two double-wide trailers to West Quincy to serve as a temporary crew building. In October 1993, the railroad indicated that new facilities at the site would be for freight crews only and would not serve Amtrak. At that time, Illinois Zephyr trains were operated with locomotives on either end, so the wye at West Quincy was not needed to turn the train around. The station was removed from Amtrak timetables in February 1994. In March 1994, the Illinois Department of Transportation confirmed that Quincy would continue to be the terminal for the Illinois Zephyr.

The Illinois Zephyr (and the 2006-added Carl Sandburg) later returned to using the West Quincy yard to lay over between trips and to reverse direction on the wye. The wye has also been used for excursion trains from St. Louis and Chicago.
