= West Quincy =

West Quincy may refer to:

- West Quincy (Quincy, Massachusetts), a neighborhood of Quincy
- West Quincy, Missouri, a commercial area in Marion County, Missouri
  - West Quincy station, a former train station
