= U.S. Route 24 =

Highway in the United States

U.S. Route 24
- US 24 highlighted in red

Route information
- Length: 1,563.82 mi (2,516.72 km)
- Existed: 1926–present

Major junctions
- West end: I-70 / US 6 near Minturn, CO
- I-25 / US 85 / US 87 in Colorado Springs, CO; I-70 near Colby, KS; I-29 / I-35 / US 71 in Kansas City, MO; I-74 in East Peoria, IL; I-55 near Chenoa, IL; I-57 in Gilman, IL; I-65 in Remington, IN; I-69 / I-469 / US 27 / US 30 / US 33 in Fort Wayne, IN; I-75 in Toledo, OH; I-94 in Taylor, MI
- East end: I-75 near Clarkston, MI

Location
- Country: United States
- States: Colorado, Kansas, Missouri, Illinois, Indiana, Ohio, Michigan

Highway system
- United States Numbered Highway System; List; Special; Divided
← US 23	→ US 25

U.S. Route 24 or U.S. Highway 24 (US 24) is one of the original United States Numbered Highways of 1926 which runs east and west for most of its routing. It originally ran from Pontiac, Michigan, in the east to Kansas City, Missouri, in the west. Today, the highway's eastern terminus is in Independence Township, Michigan, at an intersection with Interstate 75 (I-75), and its western terminus is near Minturn, Colorado, at an intersection with I-70. The highway transitions from north–south to east–west signage at the Ohio–Michigan state line.

== Route description ==
Lengths
	mi	km
CO	327.18	526.55
KS	435.95	701.59
MO	215.56	346.91
IL	255.13	410.59
IN	166.85	268.52
OH	83.33	134.11
MI	79.83	128.47
Total	1,563.82	2,516.72

=== Colorado ===
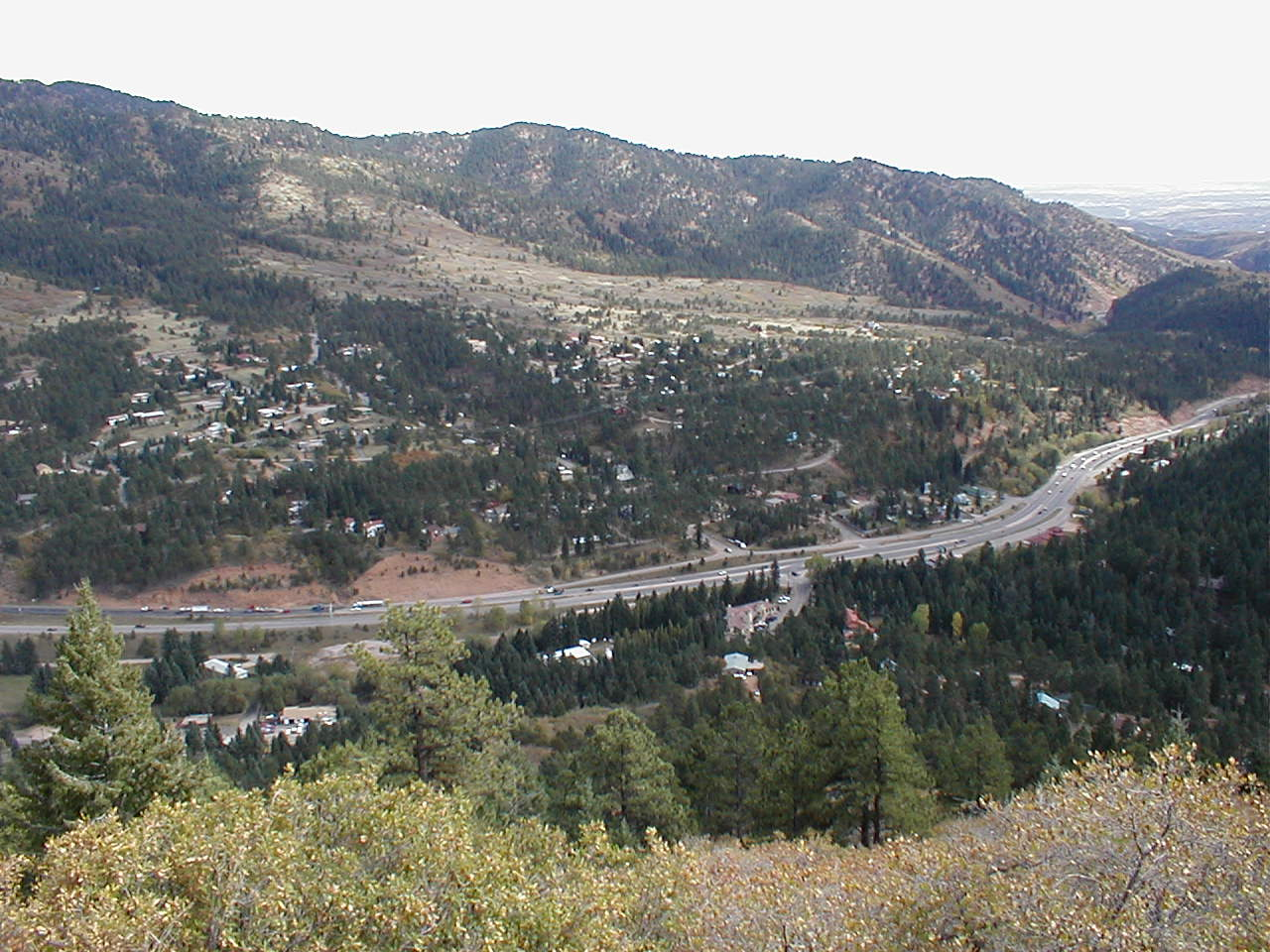
US 24 looking out on Cascade, Colorado, viewed from the Pikes Peak Highway

In Colorado, US 24 begins at the interchange of I-70 and US 6 (exit 171) near Minturn. From this interchange, US 24 proceeds southeast through Minturn and continues south to the Continental Divide at Tennessee Pass. It continues south to Johnson Village and then joins with US 285 northbound to Trout Creek Pass. After the pass, US 24 separates from US 285 and continues east to Colorado Springs and then northeast to Limon, where US 24 joins I-70 for most of the rest of its routing to the Kansas state line.

When the U.S. Numbered Highway System was started in 1926, US 24 in Colorado was designated US 40S. It began in Grand Junction and went east along the current I-70 corridor to Minturn, from which it followed the current route to Limon. From Limon east to the Kansas border, the current US 24 was designated US 40N. US 40S west of Limon and US 40N east of Limon received the US 24 designation in 1936, when US 24 was extended west from Kansas City, Missouri. The segment between Grand Junction and Minturn was decommissioned in 1975.

=== Kansas ===
In Kansas, US 24 enters from Colorado west of Kanorado; it overlaps I-70 for 45 miles (72 km) to Colby. US 24 does not meet I-70 again until Kansas City. On December 1, 2008, US 24 was rerouted southward on US 73 to I-70 west of Kansas City, continuing east on I-70 on the final 16 miles (26 km) in Kansas. US 24 serves Manhattan, as well as the northern sides of Topeka and Lawrence.

The original designation for the current US 24 route in Kansas was US 40N. It went from the Colorado border to Manhattan. In 1936, US 24 received its current designation after an extension west from Kansas City.

In Kansas, US 24 is merged with US 59 from Williamstown to a place in northern Lawrence called Teepee Junction. From there, it is merged with US 40 until Kansas City.

=== Missouri ===
In Missouri, US 24 serves Kansas City, Independence, Buckner, Lexington, Waverly, Carrollton, Keytesville, Moberly, Madison, Monroe City, Palmyra, and West Quincy. It runs concurrently with US 65 between Waverly and Carrollton, passing over the Missouri River via the Waverly Bridge when concurrent. After becoming a two-lane road, it is then concurrent with Route 5 in Keytesville (where it is called Jackson Street) and then passes by the city of Huntsville before turning into a four-lane highway and crossing US 63 at Moberly. It is finally concurrent (for the third time) with US 36 east of Monroe City and with US 61 from south of Palmyra to West Quincy. The segment shared with US 61 is part of the Avenue of the Saints.

Along the route within Independence is the Harry S. Truman Presidential Library and Museum.

=== Illinois ===
Crossing into Illinois, US 24 uses the pairing of the cable-stayed Bayview Bridge (westbound) and the older Quincy Memorial Bridge (eastbound) over the Mississippi River in Quincy. As of 2006, it is the main arterial highway from Quincy northeast to Peoria. Between these two cities, the highway follows the old Peoria to Quincy stage coach route. US 24 travels onto the Shade–Lohmann Bridge on I-474 to bypass Peoria, and it gets off at exit 9.

In East Peoria, US 24 forms a wrong-way concurrency with Illinois Route 116 and US 150 as it parallels the Illinois River. From East Peoria, US 24 runs directly east (parallel to the Toledo, Peoria and Western Railway) through a number of small towns en route to Indiana. US 24 crosses into Indiana at the state line east of Sheldon.

=== Indiana ===
In Indiana, US 24 runs east from the Illinois state line to Huntington. At Huntington, US 24 turns northeast and runs to Fort Wayne; it then overlaps I-69 and I-469 to bypass the city before entering Ohio at the state line east of Fort Wayne. The segment of US 24 between Logansport and Toledo, Ohio, is part of the Hoosier Heartland Industrial Corridor project of the Intermodal Surface Transportation Efficiency Act.

=== Ohio ===
From Fort Wayne, US 24 follows the path of the Maumee River toward Toledo. In Ohio, the roadway enters the state east of Woodburn, Indiana, near Antwerp. Between the Indiana state line and Toledo, this portion of the roadway is known as the Fort to Port segment of the Hoosier Heartland Industrial Corridor.

Between Napoleon and Toledo, modern US 24 lies north of the Maumee River as a highway built to Interstate Highway standards. Just north of Waterville is the site of the Battle of Fallen Timbers of 1794. General Anthony Wayne after constructing a trail from Fort Wayne to (Fort) Defiance, fought and defeated a Native American consortium, thus opening northern Ohio to white settlement. At a point on Toledo's north side, US 24 veers from northeast–southwest to true north–south, turning on to Telegraph Road, while Detroit Avenue continues as a city street that connects to M-125 (Dixie Highway) at the Michigan border.

The path through Toledo of US 24 follows the course of old US 25, old US 25 being farther away from the course of north–south I-75. Partially truncated as a state route, what had been US 24 was renumbered as State Route 25 where it remained a state highway, and US 25 in greater Toledo became US 24.

=== Michigan ===
In Michigan, US 24 enters from Toledo, Ohio, and serves the city of Monroe and Metro Detroit, where it is known as Telegraph Road. It continues north through the western edge of Detroit. It passes through Michigan's "mixing bowl", which is where I-696 (Walter P. Reuther Freeway), M-10 (John C. Lodge Freeway/Northwestern Highway), and Lahser Road intersect. US 24 continues north along Telegraph Road as the border between Waterford and Pontiac until its intersection with Dixie Highway where it travels to the northwest until its termination at I-75 in Independence Township.

== History ==
Between Dixie Highway in Pontiac, Michigan, and Laskey Road in Toledo, Ohio, the highway is known as Telegraph Road, named before the highway system existed after the telegraph wires to which it once ran parallel. Mark Knopfler of the rock band Dire Straits wrote the song "Telegraph Road" about the development and decay of the road, which he spotted en route to a concert. It is a major surface route through western areas of Metro Detroit.

US 24 (Telegraph Road) along the west edge of Detroit, Michigan, was one of the first roads where Michigan left turns were implemented. This pattern was introduced at the time of, or soon after, its widening to a six- to eight-lane divided highway between 1960 and 1963. Several other channelization techniques are also used; for instance, the M-153 (Ford Road) intersection includes a southbound jughandle and a cutoff for northbound left-turning traffic.

US 24 from Minturn to Limon, Colorado, is a former route of US 40S. Between Limon and Manhattan, Kansas, US 24 follows the old route of US 40N. Between Manhattan and Topeka, Kansas US 24 follows the original route of US 40.

US 24 followed State Avenue in Kansas City, Kansas until December 1, 2008, when it was rerouted onto K-7 and I-70.

From 2008 to 2012, US 24 from Fort Wayne to Toledo was mostly expanded to Interstate standards as part of an overall "Fort to Port" project, in reference to Fort Wayne and the port of Toledo.

As of 2021, US 24 has been moved to follow I-435 south and I-70 west in Kansas City, Missouri; the original US 24 that used to follow Independence Avenue is now US 24 Business.

== Major intersections ==
Colorado
I-70 / US 6 northwest of Minturn
US 285 in Johnson Village. The highways travel concurrently to Antero Junction.
I-25 / US 85 / US 87 in Colorado Springs. The highways travel concurrently through the city.
US 40 / US 287 in Limon. The highways travel concurrently to east of Limon.
I-70 in Limon
I-70 east of Limon. The highways travel concurrently to Seibert.
US 385 in Burlington. The highways travel concurrently through the city.
I-70 in Burlington. The highways travel concurrently to south-southwest of Levant, Kansas.
Kansas
US 83 south-southeast of Gem
US 283 in Hill City
US 183 in Stockton
US 281 in Osborne. The highways travel concurrently to south of Portis.
US 81 east of Glasco
US 77 in Riley. The highways travel concurrently to east of Riley.
US 75 in Topeka
US 59 in Williamstown. The highways travel concurrently to Lawrence.
US 40 / US 59 in Lawrence. US 24/US 40 travel concurrently to Kansas City, Missouri.
US 73 on the Kansas City–Bonner Springs city line. The highways travel concurrently into Bonner Springs proper.
I-70 / US 73 in Bonner Springs. I-70/US 24 travel concurrently to Kansas City, Missouri.
I-435 on the Kansas City–Edwardsville city line
I-635 in Kansas City
US 69 in Kansas City. The highways travel concurrently through the city.
I-670 in Kansas City
US 69 / US 169 in Kansas City. US 24/US 169 travel concurrently to Kansas City, Missouri.
Missouri
I-35 in Kansas City. The highways travel concurrently through the city.
I-29 / I-35 / I-70 / US 40 / US 71 in Kansas City
I-435 in Kansas City
US 65 east of Waverly. The highways travel concurrently to Carrollton.
US 63 in Moberly
US 36 in Monroe City. The highways travel concurrently to northeast of Rensselaer.
US 61 south of Palmyra. The highways travel concurrently to Taylor.
Illinois
I-172 south of Bloomfield
US 67 in Rushville
US 136 northeast of Beaty. The highways travel concurrently to Duncan Mills.
I-474 on the Peoria–Bartonville line. I-474/US 24 travel concurrently to Creve Coeur.
US 150 in East Peoria. The highways travel concurrently through the city.
I-74 in East Peoria
I-39 / US 51 in El Paso
I-55 in Chenoa
I-57 in Gilman
US 45 in Gilman. The highways travel concurrently through the city.
US 52 in Sheldon. The highways travel concurrently to Kentland, Indiana.
Indiana
US 41 / US 52 in Kentland
US 231 in Remington. The highways travel concurrently to Wolcott.
I-65 east of Remington
US 421 in Reynolds. The highways travel concurrently to Monticello.
US 35 west of Logansport. The highways travel concurrently to southeast of Logansport.
US 31 in Peru Township
US 224 in Huntington
I-69 / US 33 in Fort Wayne. The highways travel concurrently through the city.
US 30 / US 33 in Fort Wayne. US 24/US 30 travel concurrently to east of New Haven.
US 27 in Fort Wayne
I-69 / I-469 in Fort Wayne. I-469/US 24 travel concurrently to east of New Haven.
Ohio
US 127 in Emerald Township
US 6 in Napoleon Township. The highways travel concurrently to Liberty Township.
I-475 / US 23 in Maumee
US 20 in Maumee.
I-75 in Toledo
Michigan
I-275 in Ash Township
I-94 in Taylor
US 12 in Dearborn
I-96 in Redford Charter Township
I-696 in Southfield
I-75 in Springfield Township

== See also ==
- U.S. Route 124
- U.S. Route 224
- Special routes of U.S. Route 24

Browse numbered routes
← Route 23	MO	→ Route 25
