= Illinois Zephyr and Carl Sandburg =

Amtrak trains between Chicago, IL and Quincy, IL

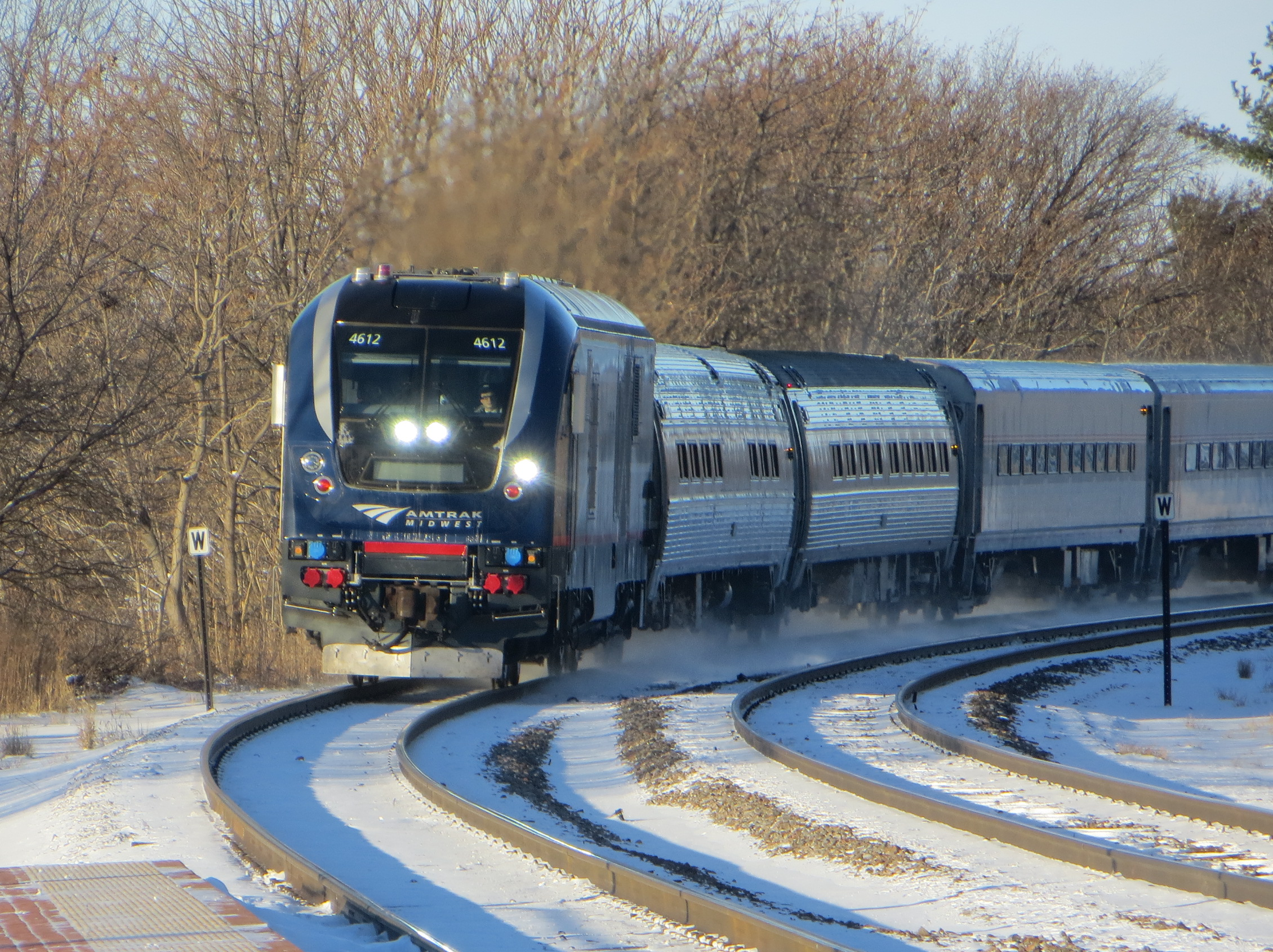
- The eastbound Illinois Zephyr arriving at Princeton in 2017

Overview
- Service type: Inter-city rail
- Status: Operating
- Locale: Illinois
- Predecessor: American Royal Zephyr; Kansas City Zephyr
- First service: November 14, 1971 (Illinois Zephyr); October 30, 2006 (Carl Sandburg)
- Current operator: Amtrak
- Annual ridership: 146,049 (FY 25) ▲3.1% (Note: Amtrak's Fiscal Year (FY) runs from October 1 of the prior year to September 30 of the named year.)

Route
- Termini: Chicago, Illinois; Quincy, Illinois
- Stops: 10
- Distance travelled: 258 miles (415 km)
- Average journey time: 4 hours, 21 minutes
- Service frequency: Two daily round trips
- Train number: 380–383

On-board services
- Classes: Reserved Coach and Business Class
- Seating arrangements: Airline-style coach seating
- Catering facilities: On-board café

Technical
- Track gauge: 4 ft 8 1/2 in (1,435 mm) standard gauge
- Track owner: BNSF

The Illinois Zephyr and Carl Sandburg are a pair of passenger trains operated by Amtrak on a 258-mile (415 km) route between Chicago and Quincy, Illinois. As Illinois Service trains, they are partially funded by the Illinois Department of Transportation. Between Chicago and Galesburg, Illinois, the trains share their route with the California Zephyr and Southwest Chief; the remainder of the route (Galesburg–Quincy) is served exclusively by the Illinois Zephyr/Carl Sandburg.

The Illinois Zephyr is the longest continuously operated state-sponsored train, having started in November 1971. The Carl Sandburg was added as the route's second daily round trip in 2006.

During fiscal year 2025, the Illinois Zephyr and Carl Sandburg carried a combined 146,049 passengers, a 3.1% increase over fiscal year 2024. The two trains had a total revenue of $10.5 million in fiscal year 2021, a 9.5% decrease over fiscal year 2014.

== History ==
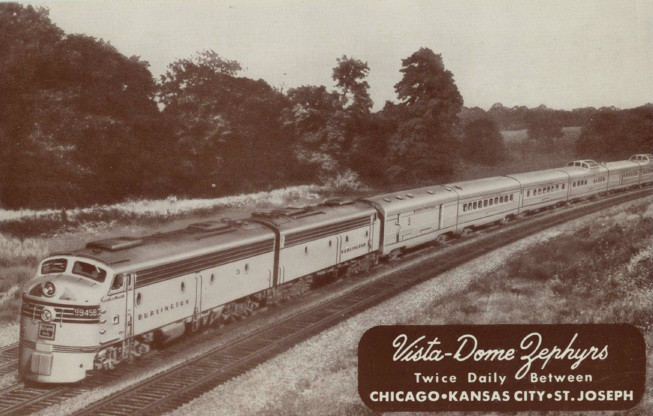
Postcard of the Kansas City Zephyr and American Royal Zephyr, predecessors to the Illinois Zephyr

The initial train route between Quincy and Chicago first opened as a part of three independent railroads in 1855. The portion of track between Quincy and Galesburg was owned by the Northern Cross Railroad, led by Nehemiah Bushnell, and was completed in 1854. This connected with the Central Military Tract Road between Galesburg and Mendota, Illinois. At Mendota, it connected with the Chicago and Aurora Railroad to complete the route to Chicago. These three railroads eventually merged into the Chicago, Burlington and Quincy Railroad.

The Illinois Zephyr is a descendant of the Kansas City Zephyr and American Royal Zephyr passenger train routes operated by the Chicago, Burlington and Quincy Railroad from 1953 until 1968 and 1971, respectively. The state of Illinois intervened in 1971 at the request of Quincy College (now Quincy University), Western Illinois University, and residents of western Illinois. This became part of the "Illinois Service" initiative in 1971 and is partially funded by the Illinois Department of Transportation. Service on the Illinois Zephyr began on November 14, 1971, between Chicago and West Quincy, Missouri. The name "Zephyr" is preserved in the current name of the line.

Service to Plano began on April 30, 1972. Service to Quincy proper began on April 24, 1983, in response to the West Quincy station being frequently cut off by flooding. The suburban stop at Aurora, was discontinued on April 28, 1985, in favor of Naperville. Passenger service was cut back to Quincy in July 1993 after West Quincy station was damaged by the Great Flood of 1993. The Illinois Zephyr and the Carl Sandburg trainsets continue to cross the Mississippi River to layover at the BNSF West Quincy rail yard for servicing between runs.

On October 30, 2006, a second round trip, the Carl Sandburg was added as part of the Midwest Regional Rail Initiative. The train's name honors the famed and Pulitzer-winning writer Carl Sandburg, whose birthplace in Galesburg, Illinois lies just a few hundred feet from this train's route. The morning westbound/evening eastbound schedule complements the opposite morning eastbound/evening westbound schedule of the Illinois Zephyr.

Starting November 16, 2022, Amtrak began substituting the morning runs of the Illinois Zephyr (train 380) and Carl Sandburg (train 381) with Amtrak Thruway buses due to staffing shortages at Amtrak's Quincy crew base. The suspension lasted until January 17, 2023.

=== Proposed extension ===
During 2010, Amtrak contacted officials from communities in northeastern Missouri and western Illinois regarding the feasibility of extending the routes from Quincy to the Missouri cities of Hannibal and St. Louis. Without any funding, though, no formal planning or studies were done for the extension.

Plans for a Hannibal extension were revived in late 2021, when a coalition of political, business, and transportation leaders was formed. A committee will investigate potential station locations in downtown Hannibal (including the Y Men’s Pavilion), discuss surrounding mobility issues (including parking, walkability, and flooding), and work to find funding for planning and studies. The committee, which will be soliciting input from the public, held its first meeting January 2022.

The Quincy–Hannibal route appeared in the 2022 Missouri State Freight and Rail Plan as a potential long-term passenger corridor. In 2023 the Missouri Department of Transportation applied for federal funding to study the route under the Infrastructure Investment and Jobs Act.

== Stations ==
Amtrak Illinois Zephyr / Carl Sandburg route

The entire current route is located in the U.S. state of Illinois, though the former West Quincy station was in Missouri.

Town/City	Station	Connections
Chicago	Chicago; Union Station	Amtrak (long-distance): California Zephyr, Cardinal, City of New Orleans, Empire Builder, Floridian, Lake Shore Limited, Southwest Chief, Texas Eagle; Amtrak (intercity): Blue Water, Borealis, Hiawatha, Illini and Saluki, Lincoln Service, Pere Marquette, Wolverine; Metra: BNSF, Heritage Corridor, Milwaukee District North, Milwaukee District West, North Central Service, SouthWest Service; Chicago "L": Blue (at Clinton) Brown Orange Pink Purple (at Quincy); Local buses: CTA, Pace; Intercity buses: Amtrak Thruway, Greyhound, Megabus
La Grange	La Grange	Metra: BNSF; Pace
Naperville	Naperville	Amtrak: California Zephyr, Southwest Chief; Metra: BNSF; Pace
Plano	Plano	KAT (dial-a-ride)
Mendota	Mendota	Amtrak: Southwest Chief; NCAT (dial-a-ride)
Princeton	Princeton	Amtrak: California Zephyr, Southwest Chief; BPART (dial-a-ride)
Kewanee	Kewanee	Henry County Public Transportation (dial-a-ride)
Galesburg	Galesburg	Amtrak: California Zephyr, Southwest Chief; Galesburg Transit
Macomb	Macomb	Go West Transit
Quincy	Quincy	Quincy Transit Lines
West Quincy, MO	West Quincy	

== Rolling stock ==
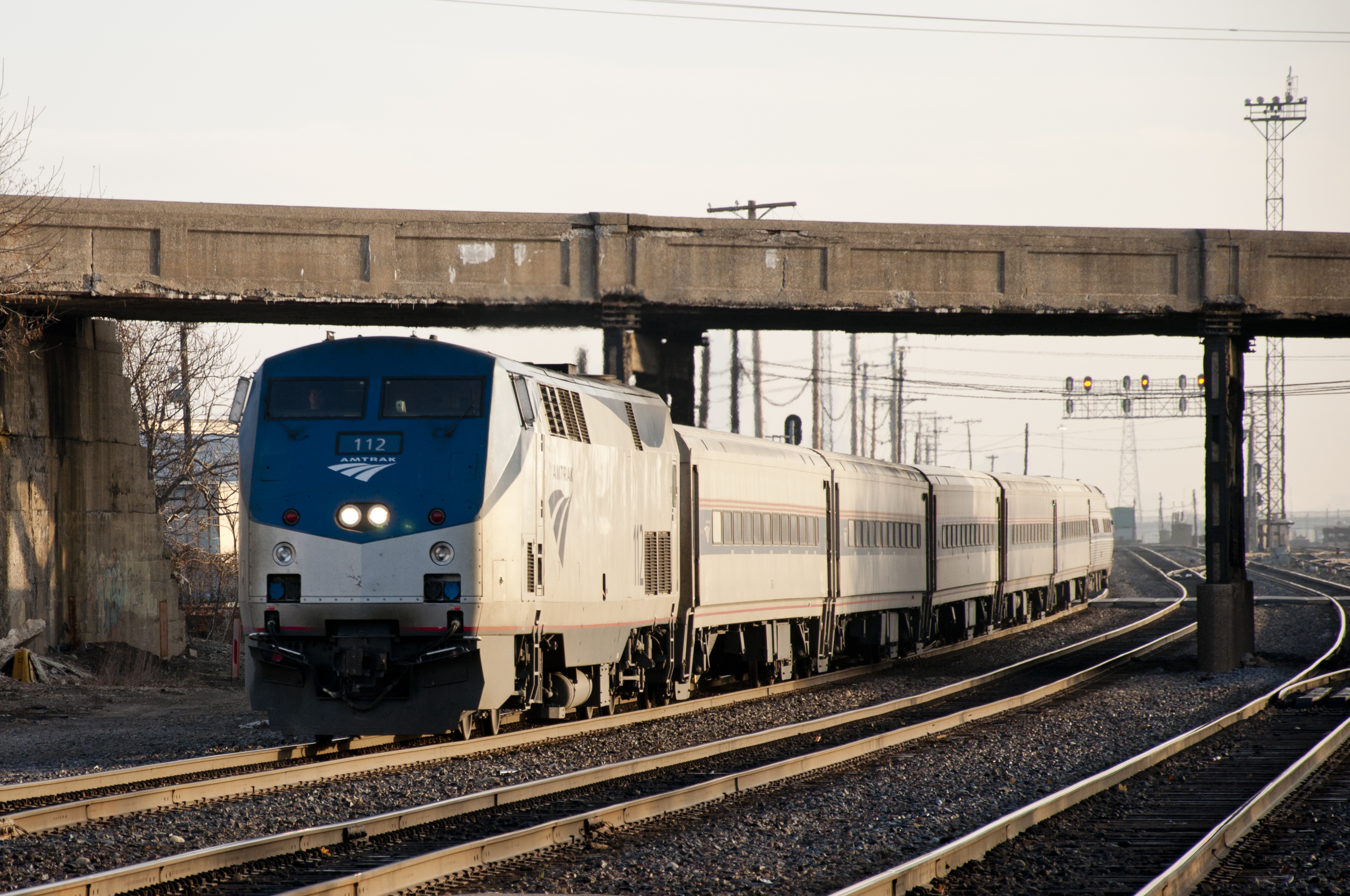
A typical Carl Sandburg in 2010

A normal Amtrak Illinois Zephyr or Carl Sandburg consists of:

- One Siemens SC-44 Charger locomotive
- Two to Three Amtrak Midwest Siemens Venture coaches
- One Amfleet I fleet Cafe/Business class car
