= Quincy Railroad =

Quincy Railroad may refer to:

- Quincy Railroad (California)
- Quincy Railway or Granite Railway, a railway in Massachusetts

== See also ==
- Quincy Railroad Bridge, a bridge over the Mississippi River
