= Kansas City Zephyr =

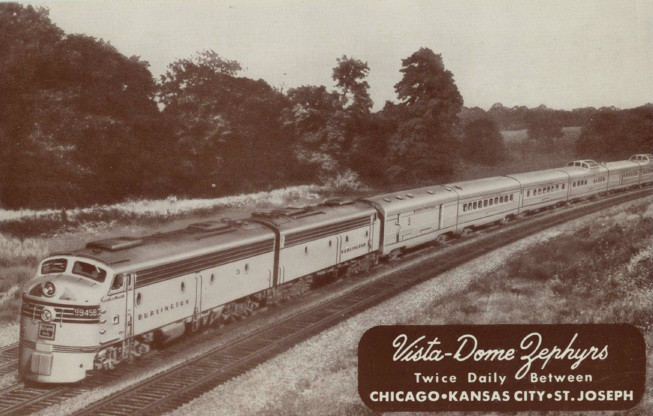
- Kansas City Zephyr

Overview
- Service type: Daytime inter-city rail
- Status: Discontinued
- First service: February 1, 1953
- Last service: April 1968
- Former operator: Chicago, Burlington and Quincy Railroad

Route
- Termini: Chicago (Union Station); Kansas City, Missouri (Union Station)
- Distance travelled: 466 miles (750 km)
- Average journey time: 8 hours 50 minutes
- Service frequency: Daily
- Train numbers: Westbound: 35, Eastbound: 36

On-board services
- Classes: Coach and Parlor
- Catering facilities: Parlor-dining car
- Observation facilities: Vista-dome chair car

Technical
- Track gauge: 4 ft 8 1/2 in (1,435 mm)

The Kansas City Zephyr was a streamliner passenger train service operated by the Chicago, Burlington and Quincy Railroad (CB&Q) between Chicago and Kansas City.

== Overview ==
The largest fleet of named streamliners in the United States were the Burlington's Zephyrs. Competing in markets against the famed Eagles, Chiefs, 400's, Cities and Hiawathas on almost every route, the polished Zephyrs covered almost every route on the mainline of the Burlington and for years held the speed/distance title in the record books.

The Kansas City Zephyr made its inaugural run on February 1, 1953, as an all-new daylight streamliner between Chicago and Kansas City. The new train was prompted by the completion the previous October of the $16-million "Kansas City Shortcut", 49 miles of new track that made the route shorter, flatter, and straighter. The new alignment shaved two hours off of the previous shortest route, and made CB&Q optimistic that it could compete successfully against its entrenched rival, the AT&SF, on this busy route. A new modern station was built in West Quincy, Missouri.

Kansas City Zephyr (KCZ) #36 departed Kansas City at 12:01 pm, arriving in Chicago at 8:00 pm. Westbound counterpart #35 departed the Windy City at 12:30 pm, arriving in Kansas City at 8:45 pm. The original consist included two Vista-Domes, coaches, diner, and observation car, all built by Budd. The CB&Q simultaneously launched an overnight Chicago-Kansas City service on the same route under the banner of the American Royal Zephyr. The Kansas City Zephyr never lived up to ridership expectations, and it was not long before equipment from the KCZ was being shuffled off to other trains. Intense competition came from the Santa Fe, which ran six daily streamliners in each direction between the city pair on a shorter schedule than CB&Q. On April 10, 1968, just over 15 years after its promising beginning, the KCZ was discontinued, becoming a nameless local train between Chicago and West Quincy, MO.

== Budd car consist ==
The Kansas City Zephyr had two consists, a dorm-buffet-lounge car and a square-end parlor-observation car in each.

- 320 Silver Garden - dorm-buffet-lounge
- 321 Silver Patio - dorm-buffet-lounge
- 365 Silver Terrace - parlor-observation
- 366 Silver Tower - parlor-observation

Two of the original railcars from the Kansas City Zephyr are still in use today. The Silver Garden, 1952 Budd Dome Lounge Coach and the Silver Terrace, 1952 Budd Dome Observation cars current operate on the Branson Scenic Railway in Branson, Missouri.

== Subsequent service on the route ==
The Illinois Zephyr and Carl Sandburg, passenger trains operated by Amtrak that run 258 miles (415 km) between Chicago and Quincy, Illinois, are the descendants of the Kansas City Zephyr and American Royal Zephyr passenger train routes operated by the Chicago, Burlington and Quincy Railroad until 1968 and 1971. The name Zephyr is preserved in the current name of the Illinois Zephyr.

== Station stops ==
Original Kansas City Zephyr, station stops:

Illinois

- Chicago Union Station
- La Grange Road station
- Aurora Old CB&Q station (abandoned and largely demolished)
- Plano station
- Mendota station
- Princeton station
- Kewanee station
- Galesburg CB&Q Seminary Street station (demolished)
- Bushnell Old CB&Q Station (No longer a stop) Relocated to the Western Illinois Threshers grounds in Hamilton, Illinois.
- Macomb station

Missouri

- West Quincy station
- Macon (CB&Q station) (demolished)
- Brookfield (CB&Q station) (demolished)
- Kansas City station
