= QCY =

QCY may refer to:

- RAF Coningsby, airfield in England, IATA code QCY
- Quincy station (Amtrak), rail station in United States, station code QCY
- QCY, a Q code used in radio communication
