= Quincy station (Amtrak) =

Amtrak intercity train station in Quincy, Illinois

Quincy, IL
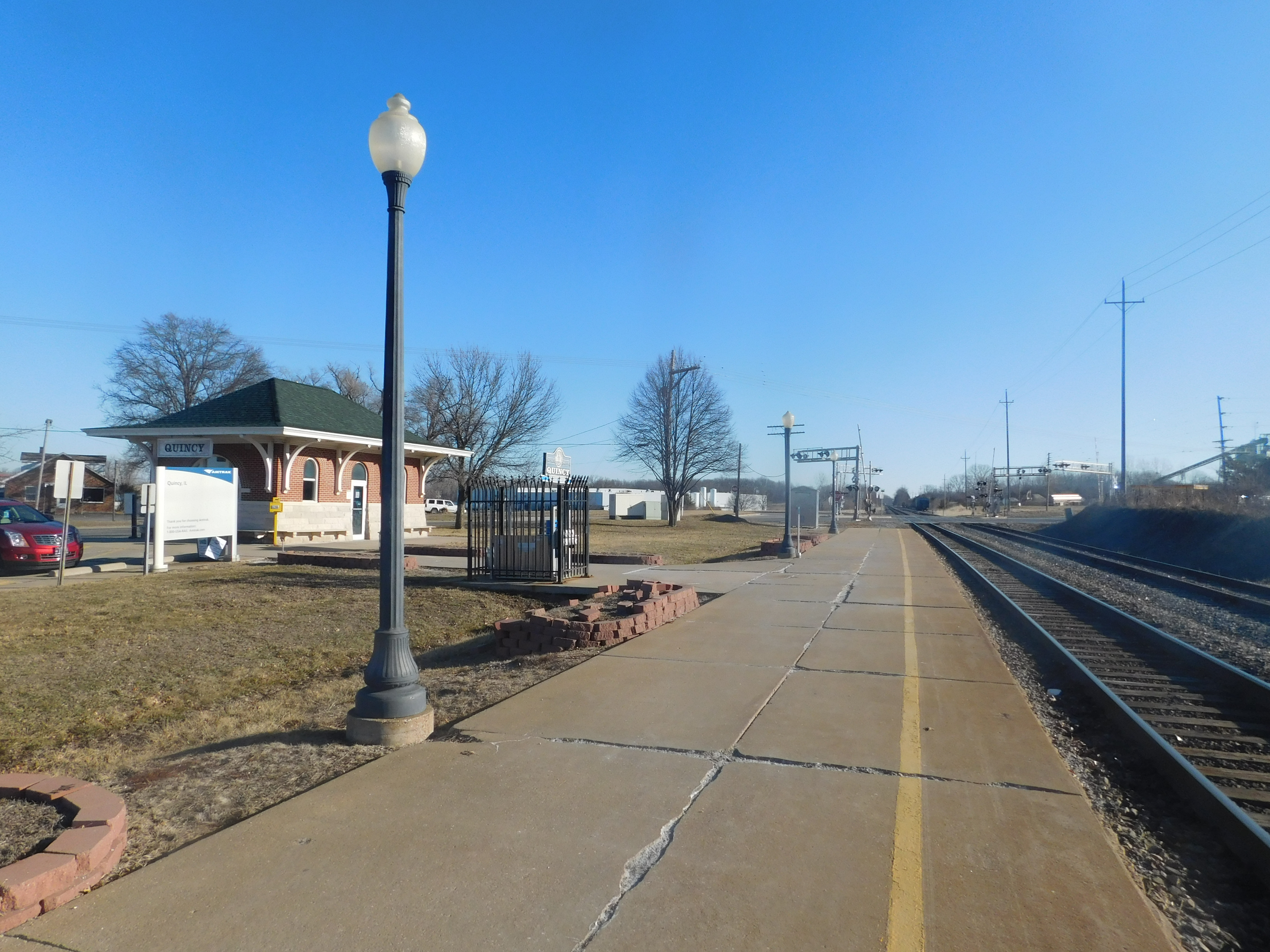
- Quincy station in February 2016

General information
- Location: North 30th Street and Wisman Lane; Quincy, Illinois
- Coordinates: 39.9570°N 91.3685°W
- Owner: City of Quincy
- Line: BNSF Brookfield Subdivision
- Platforms: 1 side platform
- Tracks: 2
- Connections: Quincy Transit Lines

Construction
- Accessible: Yes

Other information
- Station code: Amtrak: QCY

History
- Opened: 1985

Passengers
- FY 2025: 29,252 (Amtrak)

Services
Preceding station	Amtrak	Following station
Terminus	Illinois Zephyr and Carl Sandburg	Macomb toward Chicago
Former services
Preceding station	Amtrak	Following station
West Quincy Closed 1993 Terminus	Illinois Zephyr	Macomb toward Chicago
Preceding station	Burlington Route	Following station
West Quincy toward Kansas City	Kansas City – Galesburg	Ewbanks toward Galesburg
Location

Quincy station is an Amtrak intercity train station in Quincy, Illinois, United States. It is served by the two daily round trips of the Illinois Zephyr and Carl Sandburg.

== History ==
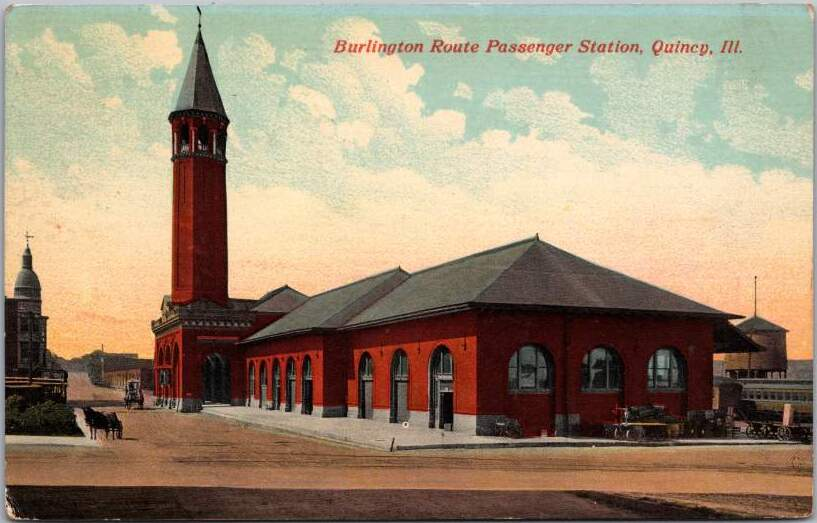
Postcard of the 1899-built station

The Quincy and Chicago Railroad opened a line from Quincy to Galesburg, Illinois, on January 31, 1856. It was soon operated as part of the Chicago, Burlington and Quincy Railroad (CB&Q), forming a line between Quincy and Chicago, and was consolidated with the CB&Q in 1865. The CB&Q, the Hannibal and St. Joseph Railroad, and the Toledo, Wabash and Western Railroad opened a bridge across the Mississippi River between Quincy and West Quincy, Missouri, on November 9, 1868. In 1897–1898, the CB&Q reconstructed the Mississippi River bridge. A second "lower" bridge, south of the main bridge, was added over Quincy Bay on the east side of the river; this formed a loop which allowed through passenger trains to serve Quincy without reversing direction. The next year, the CB&Q opened a new station at Second Street and Oak Street.

In September 1945, the CB&Q proposed to close Quincy station; a new "station" with no rails would be built in downtown Quincy, with a bus connection to a waiting room and platform in West Quincy. The move was expected to reduce running times – as well as to reduce the company's taxes by being outside Quincy city limits. Objections from city officials initially led the CB&Q to drop the plan, but it was brought back in early 1946.

In November 1952, the CB&Q announced plans to eliminate the time-consuming detour through downtown Quincy, as had been proposed in 1945. Passenger trains would use the main bridge rather than the "lower" bridge; a new station at West Quincy would replace the existing Quincy station. The change was expected to save 20–30 minutes over the old Quincy routing. On February 1, 1953, West Quincy station replaced Quincy as the city's train station. The former station was demolished in 1962. CB&Q service to West Quincy lasted until May 1971; Amtrak service began that November with the Illinois Zephyr.

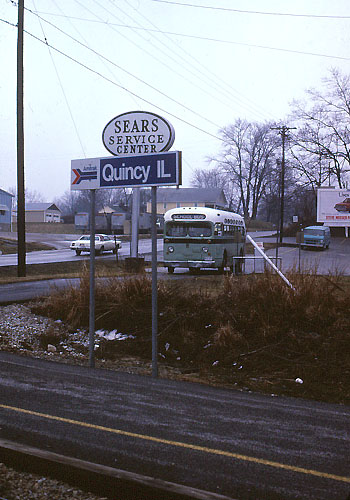
The 1983-opened station in 1984

On April 24, 1983, Amtrak opened a station at 24th Street in Quincy because the low-lying West Quincy location was prone to flooding from the Mississippi River. The station was later relocated to 30th Street; a permanent station building opened there on December 12, 1985. It was modeled after early-20th-century streetcar stations. West Quincy station closed on July 10, 1993, during the Great Flood of 1993; it was heavily damaged by the floods and never reopened.

The city received $6 million in 2010 to build a new intermodal terminal closer to downtown. In addition to serving as an Amtrak station, it would become the city's Burlington Trailways station and a transfer hub for Quincy Transit Lines. Initial plans favored a site near 2nd Street and Oak Street – the site of the city's 1899–1953 train station.
