= Go West Transit =

Provider of mass transportation in McDonough County, Illinois

- Founded: 1998
- Headquarters: 701 East Pierce Street
- Locale: Macomb, Illinois
- Service area: McDonough County, Illinois
- Service type: Bus service, paratransit
- Routes: 17
- Fleet: 18 buses
- Website: Go West Transit

Go West Transit (formally known as McDonough County Public Transportation) is the primary provider of mass transportation in McDonough County, Illinois with routes serving Western Illinois University and the Macomb area. The system runs 17 routes with over 100 stops and is the only fare-free transit system in Illinois. As of 2019, the system provided 841,943 rides over 45,934 annual vehicle revenue hours with 18 buses and 10 paratransit vehicles.

== History ==
Public transit in Macomb began in 1903 with electric streetcars operated by Macomb & Western Illinois Railway Company. However these were discontinued after only 7 years. Later, Macomb Transit Co. provided bus service in the city, but this too was discontinued in the latter half of the twentieth century.

In May 1998, Western Illinois University students voted 78% in favor of assessing a fee on themselves for the purpose of providing a bus system. This service began in February 1999 with one route. The first day saw 3 buses serving 1200 riders. By April, 3 more routes had begun service, with another route being added in October and one more in May of 2000. Ridership the first year totaled 648,891. Ridership reached 1.09 million in 2004 increasing to 1.35 million in 2006. In 2008, the Federal Transit Association (FTA) awarded Go West with a Ridership Award. Real time bus tracking began in fall 2009 with individualized bus stop texting to provide schedule times beginning in January 2010.

Since 1999, Go West Transit has served over 28.5 million riders with the all time ridership record occurring on October 29, 2011 with 15,885 riders.

== Service ==
Go West Transit operates fare-free buses on a pulse system with buses departing the city center bus transfer center at 10 and 40 past the hour. Hours of operation for regular routes are Monday through Friday from 6:58 A.M. to 6:10 P.M. and on Saturday from 11:10 A.M. to 5:10 P.M. Specific evening and weekend service is provided while WIU is in session, as well as dedicated routes from campus to Amtrak services at Macomb station.

Fares of $0.50 were in place from 2007-2009, excepting children, WIU students, those with disabilities and seniors. After fares were eliminated, ridership increased more than 200%.

== City Center Transfer Center ==
The City Center Transfer Center serves as the primary transfer hub for Go West Transit. It is located on North Randolph Street, across from the Amtrak station and opened on December 2, 2011. The facility cost around $600,000 and provides parking for Amtrak, as well as a covered waiting area with benches and heating for riders. Previously, bus transfers occurred in the parking lot of a nearby Family Video store and earlier at Spoon River College on Johnson Street.

== Fixed route ridership ==
The ridership statistics shown here are of fixed route services only and do not include demand response.

== See also ==
- List of bus transit systems in the United States
- Quincy Transit Lines
