= Bayview Bridge =

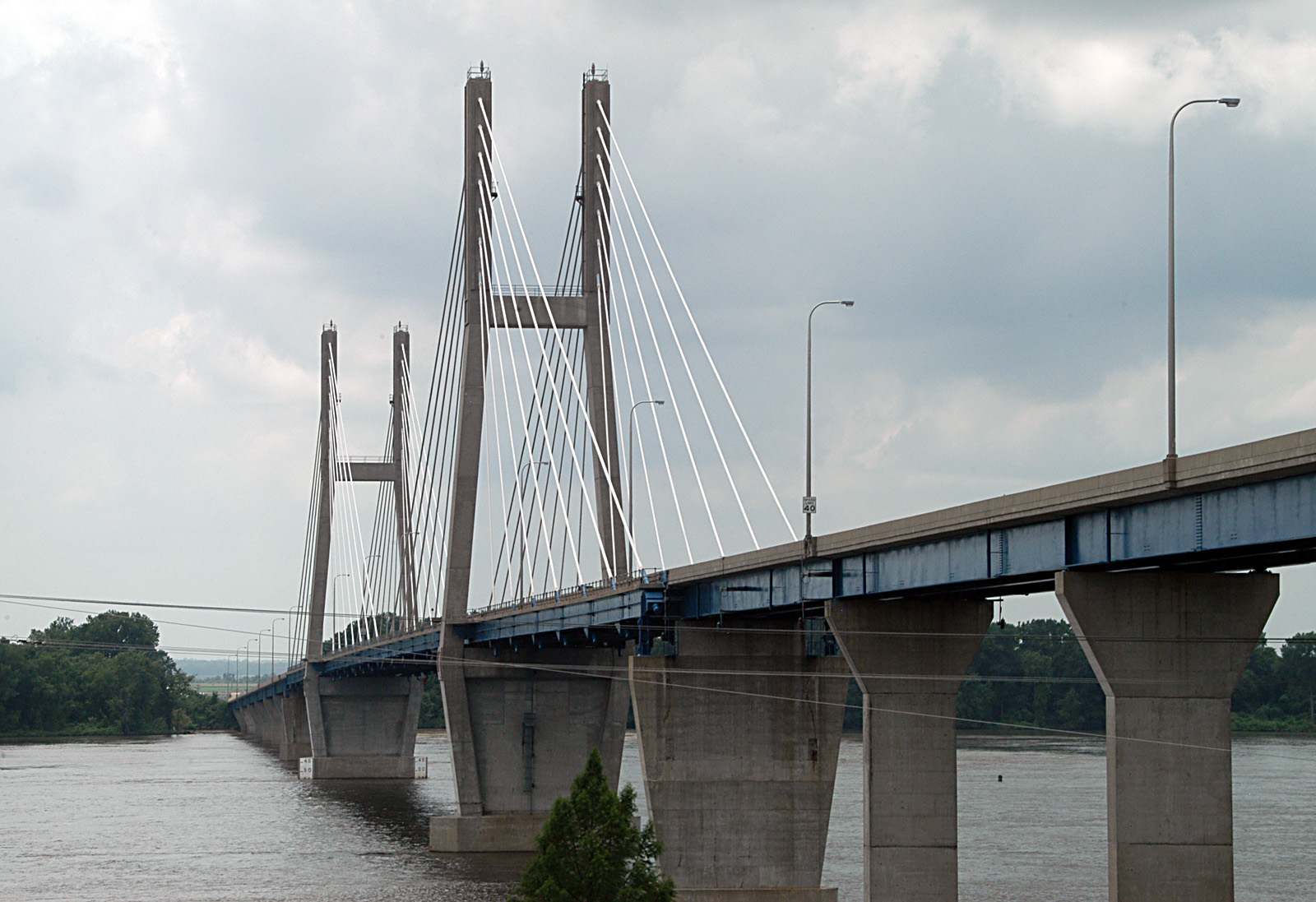
- Coordinates: 39°56′00″N 91°25′17″W
- Carries: 2 lanes of Westbound US 24
- Crosses: Mississippi River
- Locale: West Quincy, Missouri and Quincy, Illinois
- Other name: Quincy Bayview Bridge
- Maintained by: Illinois Department of Transportation

Characteristics
- Design: Cable-stayed bridge
- Total length: 4,507 feet (1,374 m)
- Width: 27 feet (8 m)
- Longest span: 900 feet (274 m)
- Clearance below: 63 feet (19 m)

History
- Opened: August 22, 1987; 38 years ago

Location
- Interactive map of Bayview Bridge

The Bayview Bridge is a cable-stayed bridge bringing westbound U.S. Route 24 (US 24) over the Mississippi River. It connects West Quincy and Quincy. Quincy Memorial Bridge serves Westbound US-24. The bridge was built at a cost of $32 million, $3 million over budget.

== Rationale for construction ==
During the 1980s, it was decided that the Quincy Memorial Bridge, though still structurally sound, was insufficient for traffic. Therefore, the Bayview Bridge was built to alleviate traffic over the older bridge. It was built before the extension of Interstate 72 (I-72) west into Hannibal, Missouri. Traffic levels increased when the existing downstream US 36 bridge over the Mississippi River was closed to make room for the new I-72 bridge.

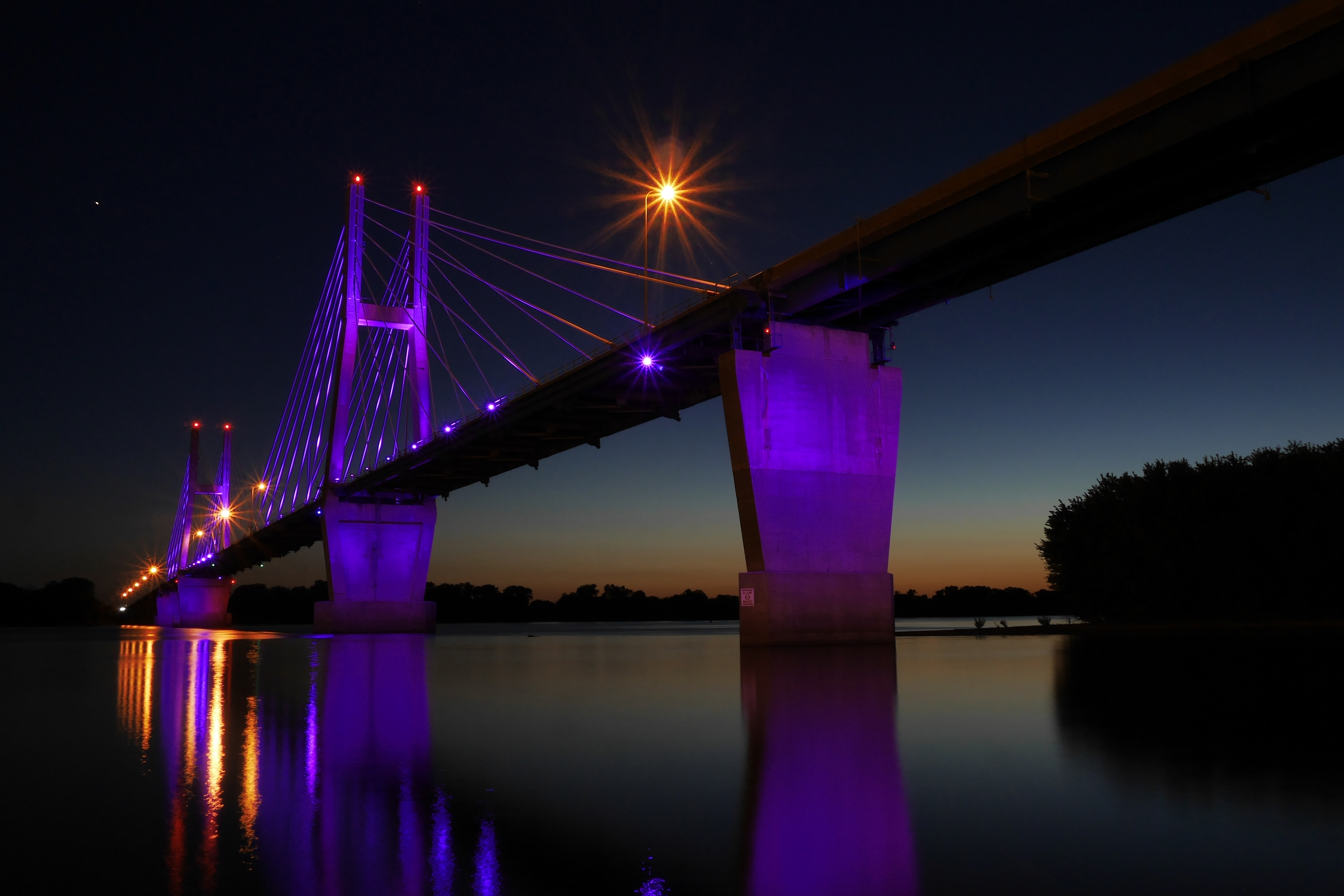

== See also ==
- List of crossings of the Upper Mississippi River
