= Johnson Village, Colorado =

Census-designated place in Chaffee County, CO, USA

- Census-designated place
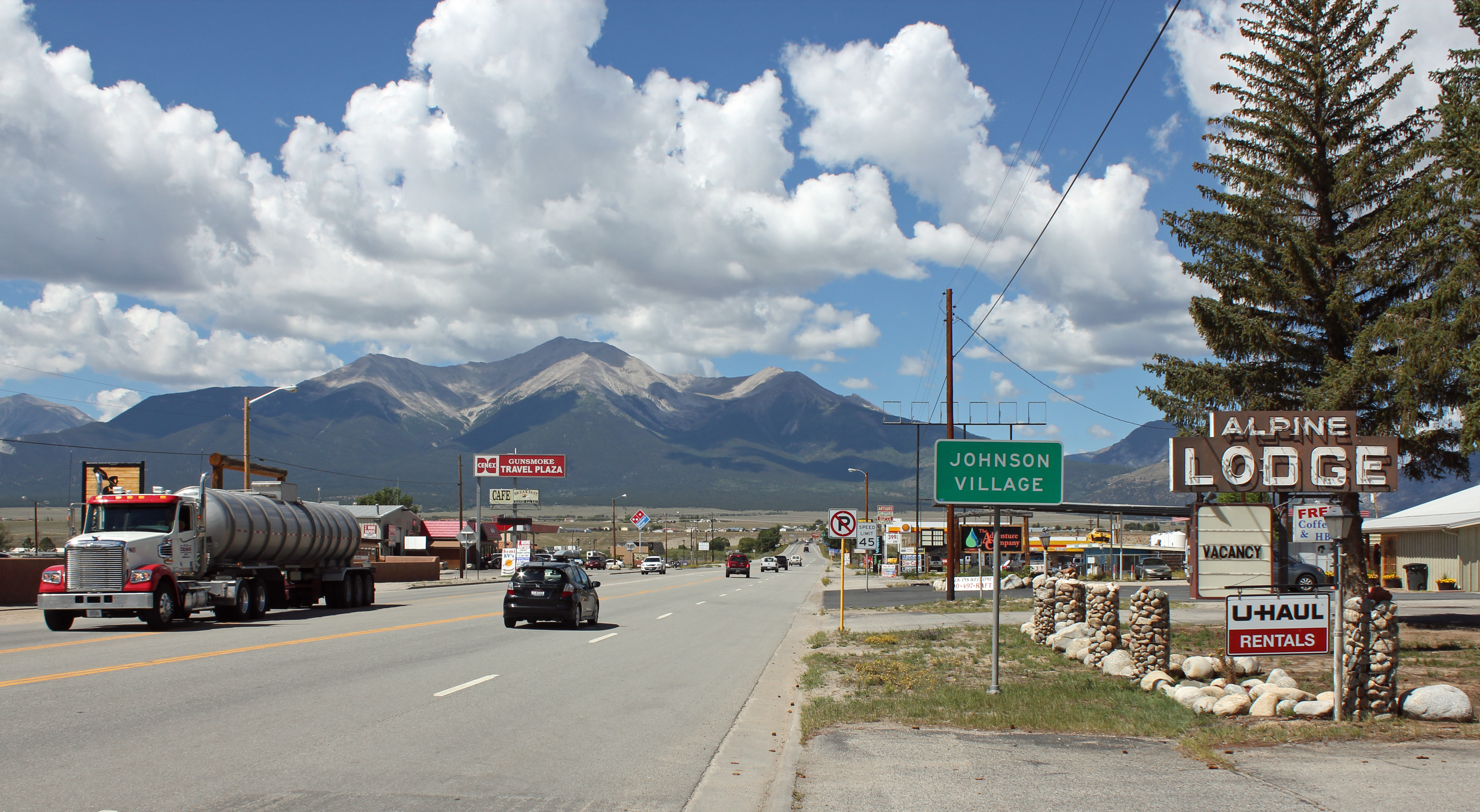
- View of Johnson Village with Mount Princeton in the background.

- Location of the Johnson Village CDP in Chaffee County, Colorado
- Coordinates: 38°48′43″N 106°06′26″W
- Country: United States
- State: Colorado
- County: Chaffee

Government
  - Type: Unincorporated community

Area
  - Total: 0.299 sq mi (0.774 km^{2})
  - Land: 0.299 sq mi (0.774 km^{2})
  - Water: 0 sq mi (0.000 km^{2})
- Elevation: 7,855 ft (2,394 m)

Population (2020)
  - Total: 299
  - Density: 1,000/sq mi (386/km^{2})
- Time zone: UTC-7 (MST)
  - Summer (DST): UTC-6 (MDT)
- ZIP Code: Buena Vista 81211
- Area code: 719
- GNIS feature ID: 2583254

Johnson Village is an unincorporated community and a census-designated place (CDP) located in and governed by Chaffee County, Colorado, United States. The population of the Johnson Village CDP was 299 at the United States Census 2020. The Buena Vista post office (Zip Code 81211) serves the area.

== Geography ==
Johnson Village is located along the west side of the Arkansas River, where the river is bridged by U.S. Highway 24. It is approximately three miles south of the town of Buena Vista. The community consists largely of a strip of retail establishments along either side of U.S. Highway 24, on the west side of Trout Creek Pass. The economy of the town is based largely on pass-through traffic, including tourism, in particular whitewater rafting on the Arkansas River.

The Johnson Village CDP has an area of 191 acres (0.774 km^{2}), all land.

== Demographics ==
The United States Census Bureau initially defined the Johnson Village CDP for the United States Census 2010.

Johnson Village CDP, Colorado
Year	Pop.	±%
2010	246	—
2020	299	+21.5%
Source: United States Census Bureau

== See also ==
- Arkansas Headwaters Recreation Area
- Browns Canyon National Monument
- Cottonwood Pass
- Trout Creek Pass
