= Quincy Memorial Bridge =

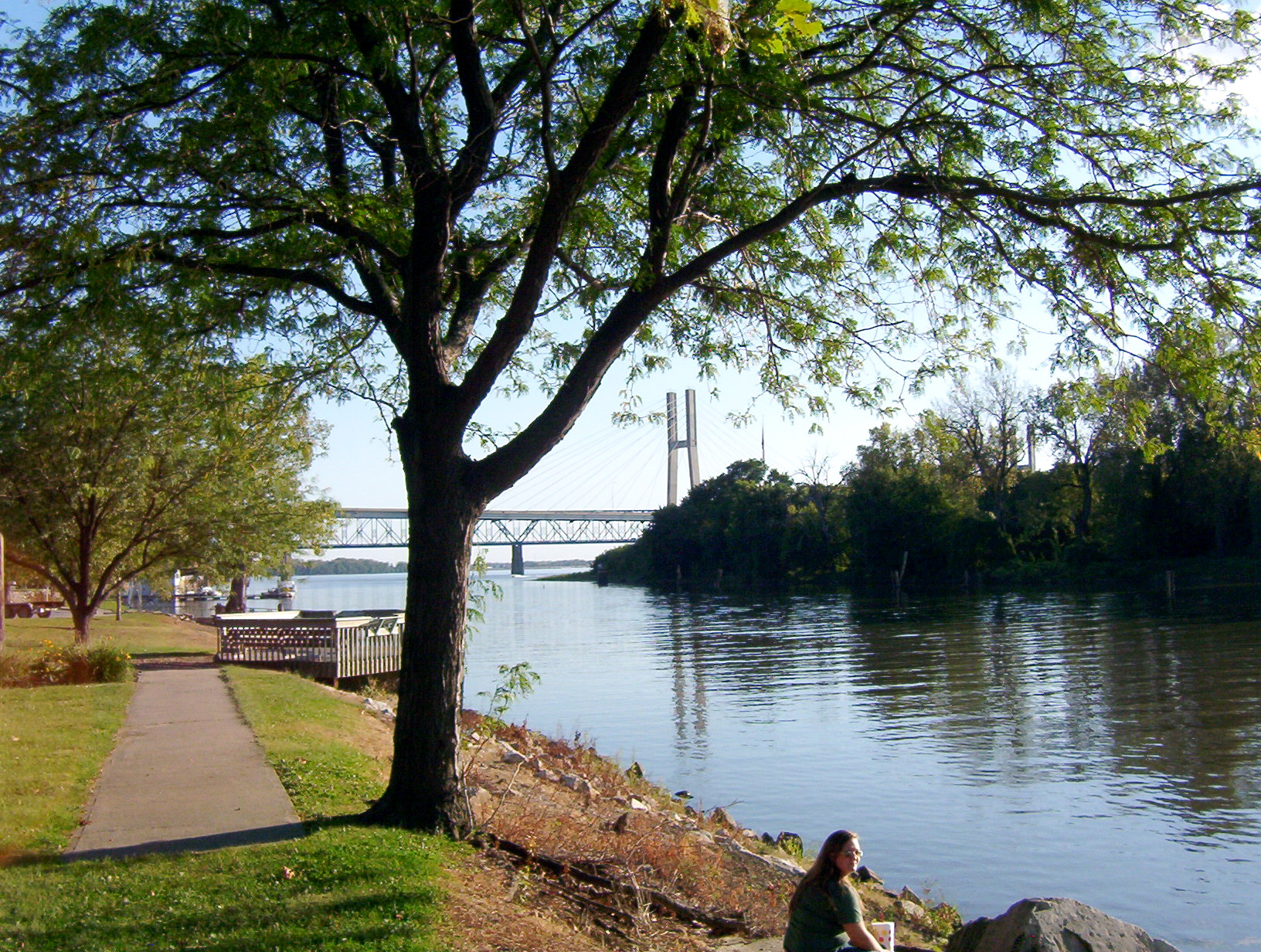
- Coordinates: 39°55′53″N 91°25′14″W
- Carries: 2 lanes of eastbound US 24
- Crosses: Mississippi River
- Locale: West Quincy, Missouri, and Quincy, Illinois
- Other name(s): Memorial Bridge
- Maintained by: Illinois Department of Transportation

Characteristics
- Design: Truss bridge
- Total length: 3,510 feet (1,070 m)
- Width: 27 feet (8 m)
- Longest span: 627 feet (191 m)
- Clearance below: 63 feet (19 m)

History
- Opened: June 13, 1930; 95 years ago

The Quincy Memorial Bridge is a truss bridge over the Mississippi River in Quincy, Illinois. It brings eastbound U.S. Highway 24 into the city of Quincy from Missouri. It was built in 1930, initially as a toll bridge, and remains structurally sound.

Building of the bridge began in 1928 by the Kelly-Atkinson Company. It was completed in 1930, with the first car crossing the bridge on May 19 of that year on an official inspection trip. Although the original toll for the bridge was 50 cents, by 1945 the city had paid the outstanding bonds which financed the bridge's construction, and the fares were eliminated.

In 1986, to serve additional traffic volumes crossing the Mississippi River into Quincy, the Illinois Department of Transportation constructed the Bayview Bridge just to the north of the Memorial Bridge. Westbound traffic was then routed onto the Bayview Bridge, while eastbound traffic was routed onto the Memorial Bridge.

Since 2012, demolition and replacement of the historic Memorial Bridge with a more modern one is being considered by the Illinois Department of Transportation to cope with increased traffic demands on the aging bridge.

== Future ==
Detailed in the 2029 Rebuild Illinois Highway Improvement Program, Quincy is slated to receive $156 million to replace the outdated Memorial Bridge, along with other funds, and is set to be completed by 2029. No known construction date is set, and no contracts have been awarded.

== See also ==
- List of crossings of the Upper Mississippi River
