= Quincy Transit Lines =

Provider of mass transportation in Adams County, Illinois

- Headquarters: 2020 Jennifer Lane
- Locale: Quincy, Illinois
- Service area: Adams County, Illinois
- Service type: Bus service, paratransit
- Routes: 4
- Fleet: 8 buses
- Annual ridership: 347,194 (2019)
- Website: Quincy Transit Lines

Quincy Transit Lines is the primary provider of mass transportation in Adams County, Illinois with four routes serving the region. As of 2019, the system provided 347,194 rides over 47,465 annual vehicle revenue hours with 8 buses and 8 paratransit vehicles.

== History ==
Public transit in Quincy began in the form of mule cars starting in 1867, operated by Quincy Horse Railway & Carrying Company. Between 1890 and 1893, the mule cars were replaced by electric streetcars and in 1912 the system came under the ownership of Illinois Traction Company. Buses were first introduced in 1925 and in 1931 the streetcars made their final run. National City Lines bought the system in 1936, renaming it Quincy City Lines. As automobile subsidies increased in the latter half of the twentieth century, the transit system lost ridership and came under public ownership in 1974.

In 2022, Quincy Transit Lines purchased 9 new buses, expected to be put in service in 2024. In addition, the agency received a $2.5 million grant to rehabilitate the old transit facility at 1900 Seminary Road.

== Service ==
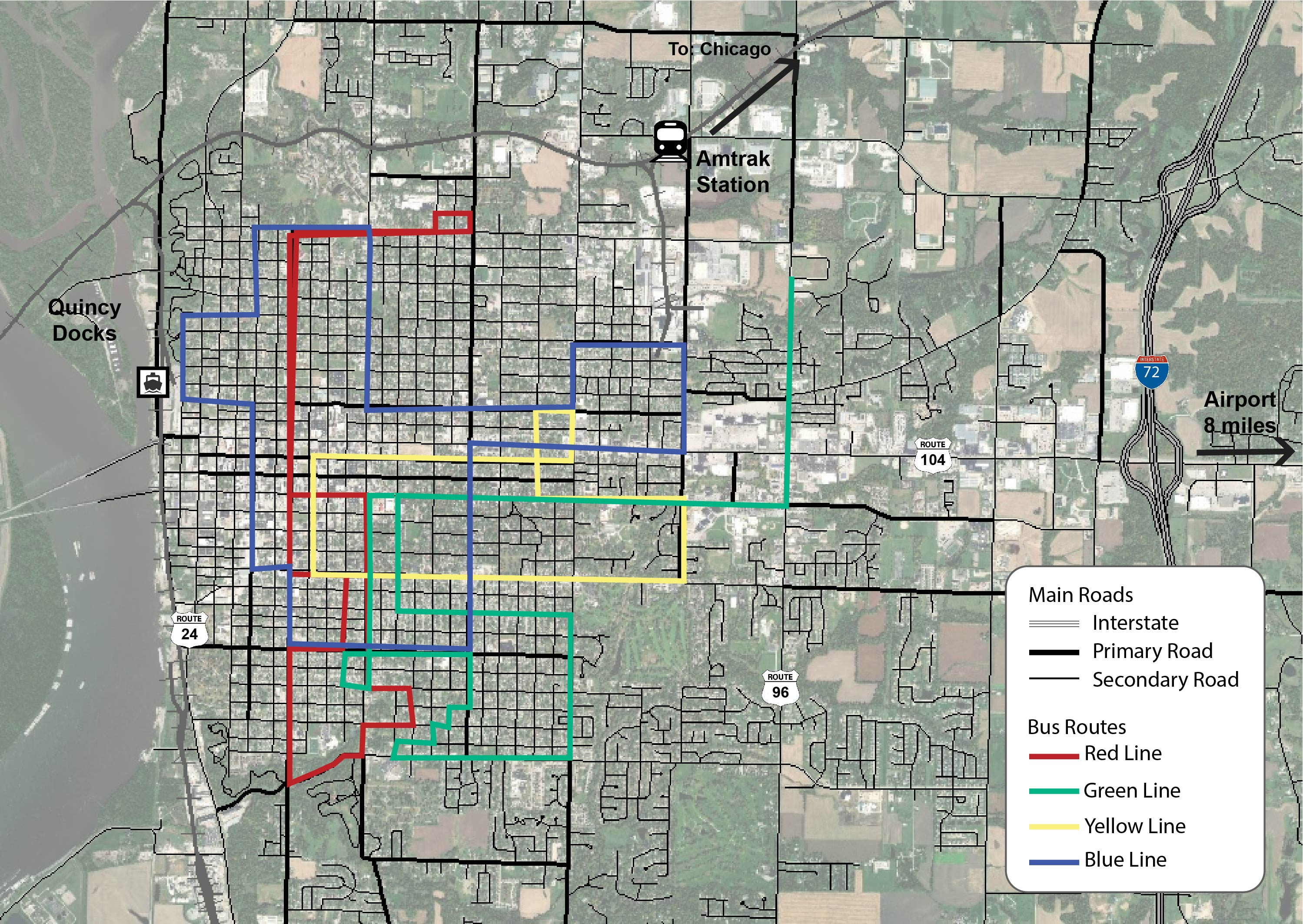
A map of transit service in Quincy circa 2019, routes have been adjusted since

Quincy Transit Lines operates 4 weekday bus routes on a pulse system with buses for the green, yellow and red lines leaving the 7th and Jersey transfer point on the hour and half hour. Blue route buses do not serve the central transfer point. Hours of operation are Monday through Friday from 6:00 A.M. to 6:00 P.M. and on Saturday and Sunday from 6:45 A.M. to 5:00 P.M. Weekend service is provided by a North route and a South route. Regular fares are $0.50, $0.25 for students and free to children and seniors.

Connections to the Quincy station serving Amtrak's Illinois Zephyr and Carl Sandburg trains are available on the Blue route, while intercity buses operated by Burlington Trailways stop at the transfer point at 7th and Jersey streets.

== Fixed Route Ridership ==
The ridership statistics shown here are of fixed route services only and do not include demand response.

== See also ==
- List of bus transit systems in the United States
- Go West Transit
