= Antero Junction, Colorado =

Ghost town in Park County, Colorado, United States

- ghost town
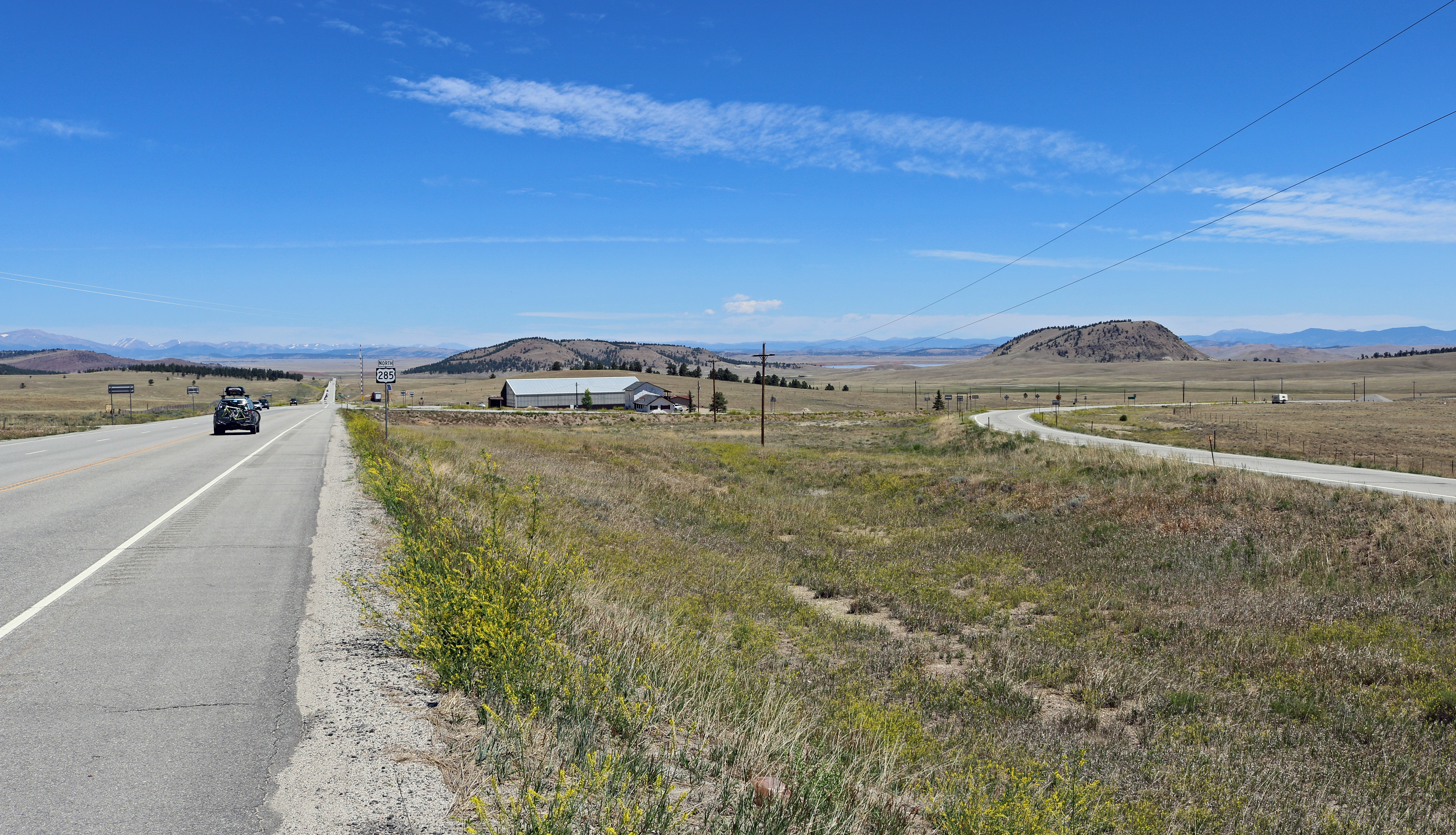
- Looking north along U.S. Route 285; U.S. Route 24 is on the right, July 2020

- Location of Antero Junction, Colorado. Antero Junction (Colorado)
- Coordinates: 38°55′24″N 105°57′55″W
- Country: United States
- State: Colorado
- County: Park

Government
  - Type: Unincorporated town
- Elevation: 9,187 ft (2,800 m)
- Time zone: UTC−07:00 (MST)
  - Summer (DST): UTC−06:00 (MDT)
- GNIS pop ID: 191088

Antero Junction is an extinct town located in Park County, Colorado, United States. Antero Junction is located at the junction of U.S. Route 285 and U.S. Route 24.

The community takes its name from Mount Antero and the highway junction. Antero Junction never had a post office.

== See also ==
- List of ghost towns in Colorado
