= American Royal Zephyr =

Former passenger rail service

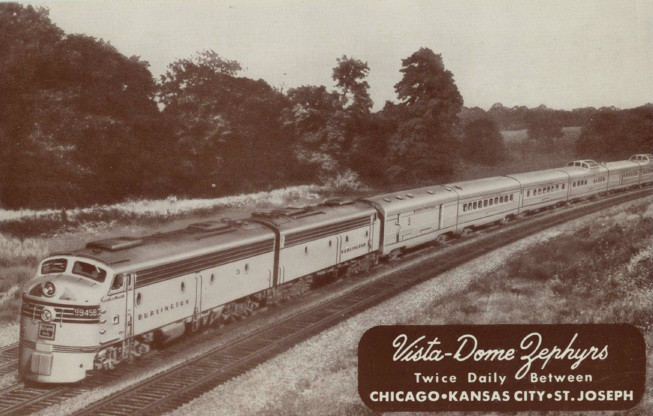
- American Royal Zephyr

Overview
- Service type: Inter-city rail
- Status: Discontinued
- First service: February 1, 1953
- Last service: 1971
- Former operator: Chicago, Burlington and Quincy Railroad

Route
- Termini: Chicago (Union Station); Kansas City, Missouri (Union Station)
- Distance travelled: 466 miles (750 km)
- Service frequency: Daily
- Train number: 19/20

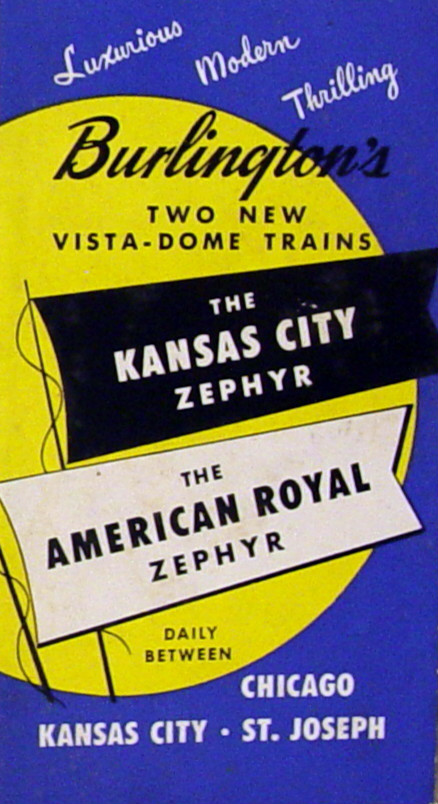
Brochure for the new trains.

The American Royal Zephyr was a streamlined passenger train service operated by the Chicago, Burlington and Quincy Railroad between Chicago and Kansas City. This CB&Q Zephyr was named for the American Royal, one of the Midwest's largest and oldest livestock exhibition, professional rodeo, and horse show.

The American Royal Zephyr made its inaugural run on February 1, 1953, as an all-new overnight streamliner between Chicago and Kansas City. The new train was prompted by the completion the previous October of the $16-million "Kansas City Shortcut", 49 miles of new track that made the route shorter, flatter, and straighter. The new alignment shaved 2 hours off of the previous shortest route, and made CB&Q optimistic that it could compete successfully against its entrenched rival, the AT&SF, on this busy route.

American Royal Zephyr #56 departed Kansas City at 10:00 pm, arriving in Chicago at 7:30 am. Westbound counterpart #55 operated on a mirrored schedule, departing the Windy City at 10:00 pm and arriving in Kansas City at 7:30 am. Both trains covered the 466 mile route at an average pace of 49 mph. The original consist included two Vista-Domes (which provided meal service), two Chicago-KC sleepers, one Chicago - St. Joe sleeper, and coaches. The CB&Q simultaneously launched a daylight Chicago-Kansas City service on the same route under the banner of the Kansas City Zephyr. Like its daylight counterpart, the American Royal Zephyr never lived up to ridership expectations, and it was not long before equipment from the ARZ was being shuffled off to other trains. Intense competition came from the Santa Fe, which ran six daily streamliners in each direction through Kansas City on a shorter schedule than CB&Q, and an existing, dedicated overnight service called the Kansas City Chief.

The American Royal Zephyr was discontinued in 1971.

== Station stops ==
Original American Royal Zephyr, station stops:

Illinois

- Chicago Union Station
- La Grange Road station
- Aurora old CB&Q station (abandoned, largely demolished)
- Plano station
- Mendota station
- Princeton station
- Kewanee station
- Galesburg CB&Q Seminary Street station (demolished)
- Macomb station

Missouri

- West Quincy station
- Macon (CB&Q station)
- Chillicothe (CB&Q station)
- Kansas City station
