= Trout Creek Pass =

Mountain pass in Colorado, USA

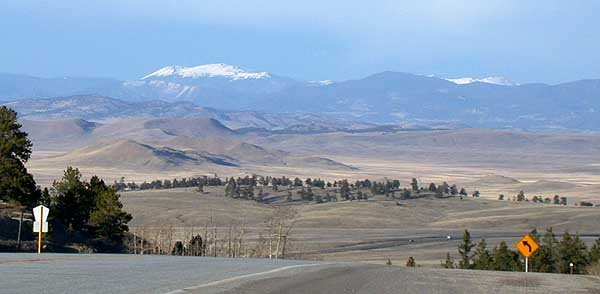
- View from Trout Creek Pass

- Location within Colorado
- Elevation: 9,346 ft (2,849 m)
- Traversed by: US 24 / US 285

Third Approach
- Location: Chaffee / Park counties, Colorado, U.S.
- Range: Mosquito Range
- Coordinates: 38°54′36″N 105°58′30″W
- Topo map: USGS Antero Reservoir

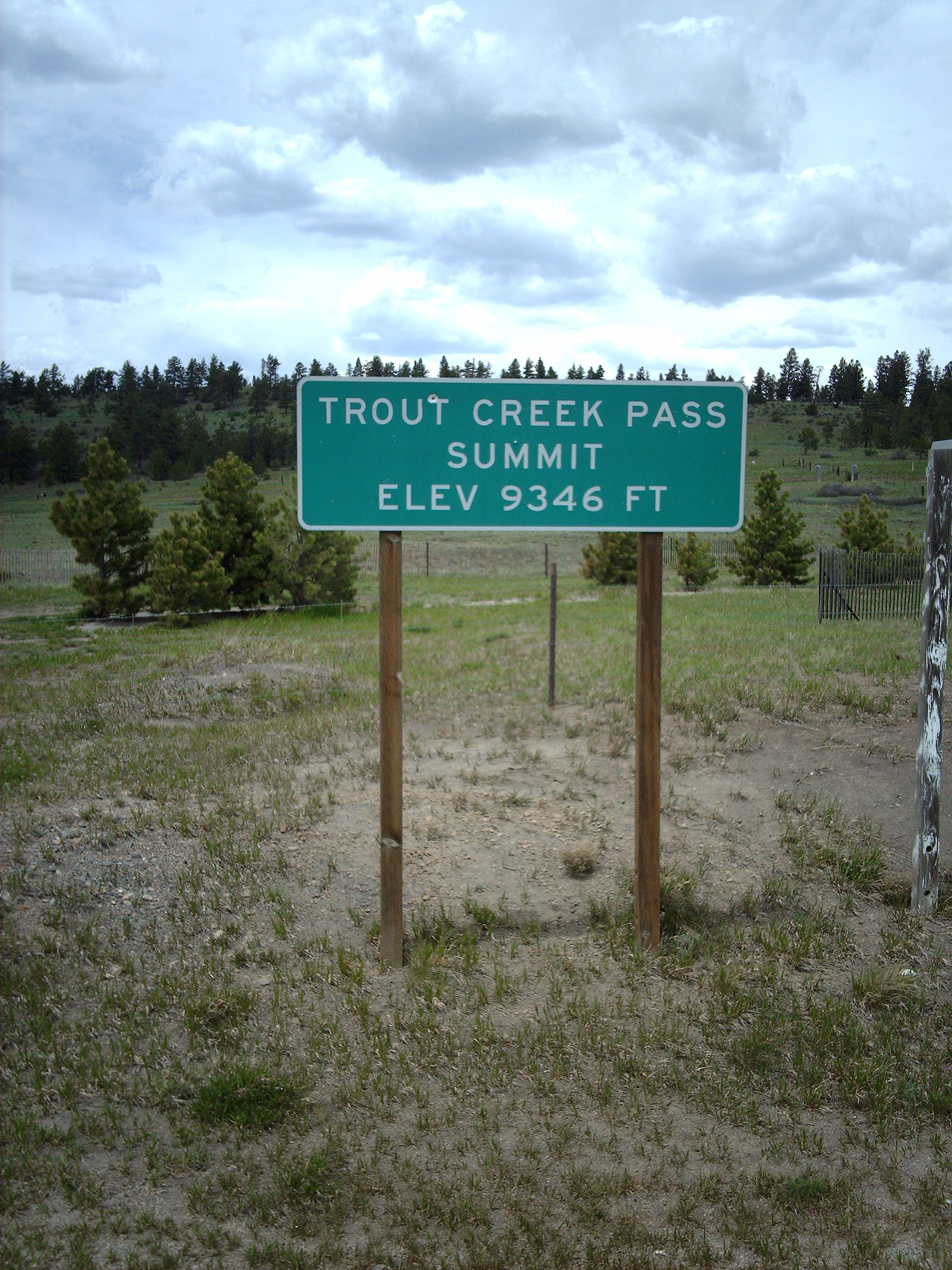
Sign at the summit

Trout Creek Pass, elevation 9,346 ft (2,849 m), is a mountain pass located in the Rocky Mountains of south-central Colorado in the United States. The pass sits atop the southern end of the Mosquito Range on the Park-Chaffee county line, between South Park (the headwaters of the South Platte River to the east) and the headwaters of the Arkansas River to the west. It is traversed jointly by U.S. Highway 24 (US 24) (between Hartsel and Buena Vista) and US 285 (between Fairplay and Buena Vista). Most motorised vehicles can travel on it, and it is only ever closed during really bad winter storms. While the south side has a moderate 5% gradient, the approach from the north is gentle.

The elevation stated on the highway sign at the summit (see attached picture) appears to be in error by about 140 ft (43 m), as it disagrees with well-established topographic maps as well as published data.

Geologically, the pass is located on a fault that runs along the Mosquito Range. Road cuts along the eastern approach to the pass reveal Pennsylvanian black shale and thin gray limestone layers that were laid down prior to the creation of the Ancestral Rockies. These Paleozoic layers were not uplifted during the creation of the Ancestral Rockies approximately 300 MYA and thus were not eroded to the same degree as other areas to the east and west.

The pass was traversed by the Denver, South Park and Pacific Railroad in 1879, providing the first rail link between Denver and Leadville in the early days of the Colorado Silver Boom. The Colorado Midland also built a line west from Colorado Springs to Leadville over Trout Creek Pass in the 1890s. Both lines fell into disuse in the 1920s.

The pass is in the San Isabel National Forest.

== See also ==
- Colorado mountain passes
