= Macomb station =

Amtrak intercity train station in Macomb, Illinois

Macomb, IL
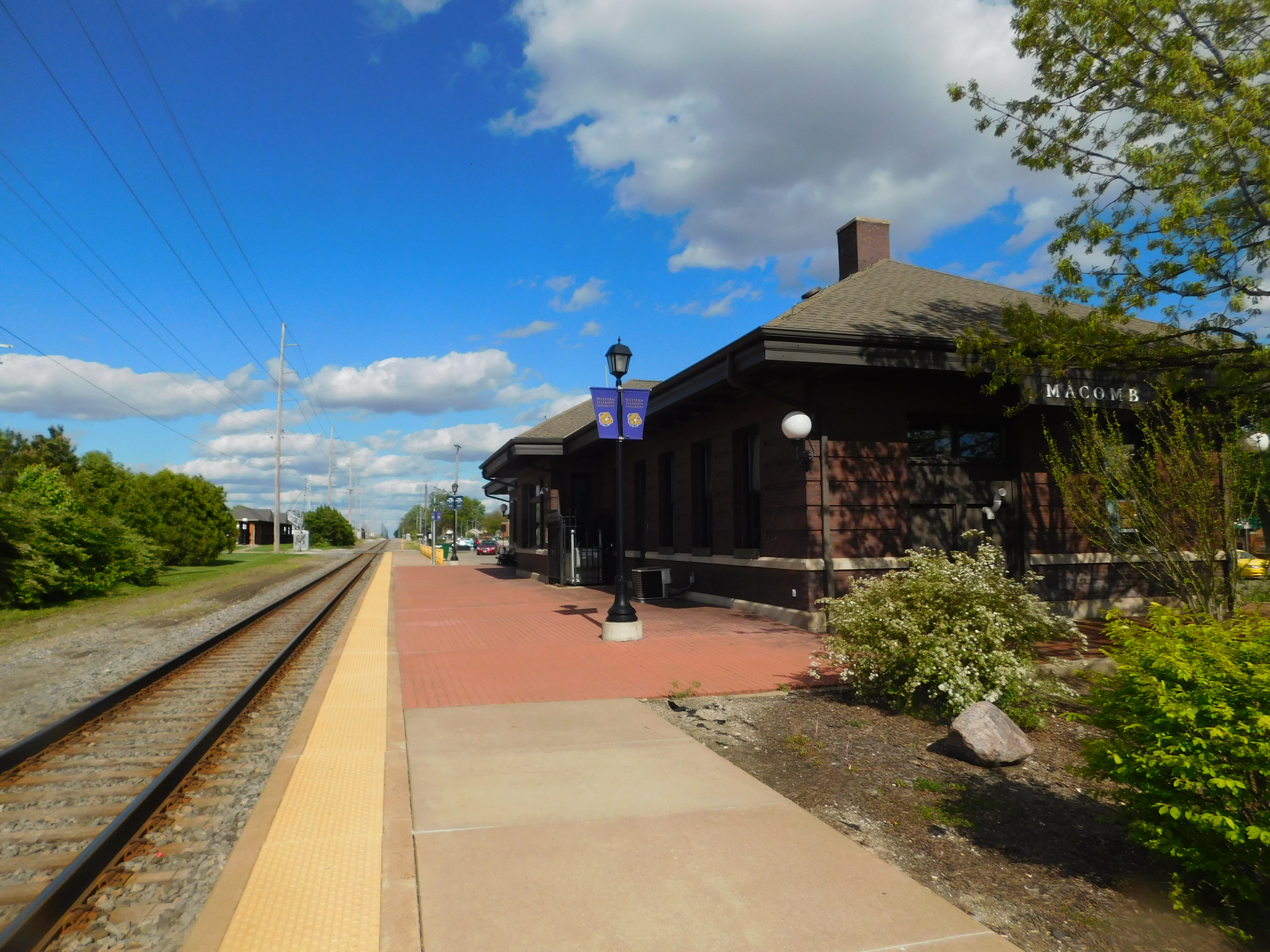
- Macomb station in May 2017.

General information
- Location: 120 East Calhoun Street; Macomb, Illinois
- Coordinates: 40.4611°N 90.6724°W
- Line: BNSF Brookfield Subdivision
- Platforms: 1 side platform
- Tracks: 1
- Connections: Go West Transit: 5, 6, 10, 15, 16, 18, 19

Other information
- Station code: Amtrak: MAC

History
- Opened: November 1855
- Rebuilt: June 1879; 1913

Key dates
- May 26, 1879: 1866 station depot burned

Passengers
- FY 2025: 40,454 (Amtrak)

Services
Preceding station	Amtrak	Following station
Quincy Terminus	Illinois Zephyr and Carl Sandburg	Galesburg toward Chicago
Former services
Preceding station	Burlington Route	Following station
Colchester toward Kansas City	Kansas City – Galesburg	Bardolph toward Galesburg
Location

Macomb station (officially the Thomas C. Carper Amtrak Station) is an Amtrak intercity train station in Macomb, Illinois, United States. There is one daily morning train to Chicago. In the evening, the return train continues on to Quincy, Illinois. The station is a brick structure constructed around 1913 by the Chicago, Burlington and Quincy Railroad as designed by the railroad's architect Walter Theodore Krausch. The city of Macomb leases the station from BNSF Railway to prevent demolition and has done so since 1971.

In 2017, Amtrak and the city of Macomb agreed to be the first member of a pilot project in which the station platform would be upgraded. Amtrak visited the station in 2016 and railroad engineers drew up plans for a new platform. By doing so, it would also get the station interior a full remodel, making sure the doors and restrooms are all accessible with the Americans with Disabilities Act of 1990. They speculated cost for the new project would be $100,000–$200,000. Amtrak rebuilt the platform at Macomb station in 2022, making it compliant with the Americans with Disabilities Act at the cost of $2.7 million. The new platform, 300 feet (91 m) long, contained a new brick pattern surface with concrete, new hand and guard rails, and a snowmelt system built into the platform to make it easier for cleaning in the winter. The railroad and city officials unveiled the new platform to the public on August 24, 2022.

Amtrak and the city of Macomb dedicated the station on May 16, 2024 in honor of Tom Carper, Mayor of Macomb from 1991–2013 and Amtrak Board member from 2008–2024.

== Station layout and services ==
Macomb is a single low-level side platform station located at 120 East Calhoun Street (U.S. Route 136), between Lafayette Street (U.S. Route 67) and North Randolph Street. The station contains a single track with a 300-foot (91 m) long partial brick and concrete platform that contains a built-in tubular snowmelt system to prevent accumulation of snow on the platform. The platform contains a wheelchair elevator for those with disabilities. The 1913-built station brick and sandstone depot is on the platform and available for use. The station doubles as the headquarters of the Macomb Convention and Visitors Bureau. There is a small parking lot next to the depot, with access from East Calhoun Street, offering same-day and overnight parking.

Macomb station serves Amtrak's Illinois Zephyr and Carl Sandburg services that operate between Chicago Union Station and Quincy. The Illinois Zephyr operates as trains 380 (inbound) and 383 ( outbound) while the Carl Sandburg as trains 382 (inbound) and 381 (outbound). The next station inbound is Galesburg–Seminary Street station while the next station outbound is Quincy.

== History ==
With railroads gaining popularity in the 1850s, surveyors and financiers looked across the state to find people interested in raising money for the construction of railroads that would reach the Mississippi River and places further west. In 1851, a proposal came for the Northern Cross Railroad, a railroad that would connect the Illinois and Michigan Canal and the Mississippi River at Quincy, Illinois. At that time, railroads were under construction included the Chicago and Aurora Railroad (originally the Aurora Branch Railroad) and the Central Military Tract Railroad, both of which came from Galesburg. Both railroads, interested in reaching the river, convinced the proposed Northern Cross Railroad to change their northern terminus to Galesburg, making a complete railroad line from Chicago to Quincy.

Macomb held its first meeting on the Northern Cross Railroad on November 5, 1851, looking to sell $50,000 (1851 USD) in stock for the construction of the new line. However, locals were opposed to the construction, influencing an election in March 1852 to approve the stock purchase. Some residents in McDonough County felt that horse-drawn carts could take local goods to places outside the county and a railroad would be unnecessary. The opposition resulted in the election being delayed from March to May 1852, when citizens voted to approve the stock purchase, 817 to 644.

Purchase of the stock did not result in construction of the railroad. Judge Nehemiah Bushnell, who was the President of the Northern Cross Railroad, failed to get support from capitalists he expected. As a result, McDonough County contributed an extra $25,000 and other fundraising efforts in June 1853 caused construction to begin. The first Northern Cross Railroad train entered Macomb in October 1855, using the Fulton locomotive from Quincy. Service to Galesburg came in January 1856 and merged with the Chicago and Aurora.

The first train station in the city of Macomb opened in 1856 west of the city square, resulting in immediate growth of the municipality. The prosperity of a new railroad through Macomb resulted in the population doubling from 1850–1855 and in 1856, the municipality filed to become a city. Tall structures that were three stories tall replaced single-story structures that were there prior for several blocks in the area and the construction of the Randolph Hotel on East Side Square, which operated a horse-drawn omnibus service from the depot in Macomb, including a visit by Abraham Lincoln in 1858.

=== 1862 slave incident ===
On December 31, 1862, an eastbound Chicago, Burlington and Quincy Railroad train stopped at Macomb. Upon stopping, a citizen of McDonough County boarded the train and removed two African-American people from the train. The man who pulled the African-Americans from the train claimed that they were runaway slaves from their master and wanted to return them. In return for sending the two people back, the citizen thought he would get monetary compensation to keep a supply of whisky and tobacco. John Lane, the Macomb City Marshal, checked on the two riders, noting that they were traveling on the Chicago, Burlington and Quincy Railroad train with a railroad pass from their master. Lane took the pass from the riders and stated that he would ensure their safety, bringing them to the Randolph Hotel. At the hotel, Lane ensured that they were kept safe from any parties looking to hurt them.

Despite Lane's actions, a party of people out to capture the slaves rode out to the Randolph Hotel while heavily intoxicated. The intoxicated party demanded William H. Randolph release the slaves to them. Randolph told the leader to get off the property and kicked him. The angry leader threatened revenge on Randolph but departed. Friends of Randolph held until midnight January 1, 1863 when the Emancipation Proclamation came into effect. Afterwards, they were free and could leave on their own.

=== Late 19th century ===
In April 1866, local businessmen in the city of Macomb spent $2,100 to purchase land for a new railroad depot. They donated the land to the city in July 1866, declining a return of $300 from the Macomb City Council for their efforts. Instead, the money went to the sidewalks in the city. The Chicago, Burlington and Quincy Railroad constructed a brand new station in Macomb at the junction of Randolph and Calhoun Streets, which opened in 1867. The new station led to immediate new construction in the area, including a new warehouse and stock yards. Martin and Thomas, a local firm, purchased the original 1856 depot and stated that they would move it closer to downtown Macomb, converting it into a shop for carpenters. By February 21, the 1856 depot reached its new location, to be used for the Gesler family for their operations.

Sparks from a passing locomotive caused the passenger depot at Macomb to catch fire on May 26, 1879, leveling the entire structure. Construction of a new station came immediately, with the frame being constructed at Galesburg in June 1879. The plan would be for the new depot construction in Macomb to begin on June 22.

The Chicago, Burlington and Quincy Railroad installed oil lamps at the station in November 1893, replacing old gas systems at the depot. Heavy demand resulted in the baggage room at the station being enlarged in April 1899.

=== Macomb and Western Illinois Railway debacle ===
In 1907, St. Paul's Catholic Church in Macomb filed a lawsuit to prevent the Macomb and Western Illinois Railway (M&WI), a small interurban railroad from Macomb to Littleton, Illinois, from operating steam engines on the streets in the city. This case would reach the Illinois State Supreme Court in Springfield. The court ruled in favor of the railroad, citing that the railroad was subject to property owners along the right-of-way, but not the church individually. A second lawsuit, filed by James W. Stuart in the McDonough County Circuit Court, went in favor of Stuart. Stuart requested that the railroad be forced out of the city limits. The judge stated that the M&WI violated is charter by ending at the junction of Johnson and Jackson Streets in Macomb, not to Lafayette Street. This order resulted in a stipulation that the M&WI would have to remove their tracks within the city limits within one year.

On June 8, 1907, a week after the Stuart ruling, courts forced C.V. Chandler & Company, the operator, into involuntary bankruptcy at Peoria. Despite negotiations, the creditor stated they could no longer make a deal and on September 11, the court appointed Frank W. Brooks of Blandinsville to be the receiver of all Chandler properties. To make things worse, on June 28, Stuart filed another lawsuit. This lawsuit was to prevent the M&WI from operating steam engines in the city of Macomb. The operation requested engines cease operating around the property of Maria Gamage, a local family, noting that the railroad's steam engines aggravating poor health conditions. While a local magistrate heard the case, Gamage died before any decisions could be made.

The deadline for the abandonment of all services in the city of Macomb was June 1, 1908. That day, they notified the city that all passenger service would end at Macomb Yards south of the city on July 3, upsetting locals. A drop in passenger ridership came with the new terminus because of the inconvenient location. However, the changes resulted in a local operation to save the railroad. Local businessmen and the Macomb Commercial Association worked to find a new route for the passenger trains to operate in the city of Macomb. With influence of C.V. Chander, two proposals were drawn up. The first would build a new terminal on Chase Street following a new right-of-way between McArthur and Johnson Streets. The other would build a new right-of-way from Macomb Yards to near the Chicago, Burlington and Quincy Railroad near the Jackson Street or Carroll Street grade crossings.

Chandler represented the railroad in negotiations, but it was soon determined that the Chase Street option was impossible. The other option, which would parallel the Burlington, faced roadblocks. The railroad would need significant money to condemn and raze houses and other property along the Burlington right-of-way. As a result, they would need to get the land from the Chicago, Burlington and Quincy Railroad itself, which the latter refused to do. The Burlington proposed the M&WI would pay for the rights to use Chicago, Burlington and Quincy Railroad tracks to downtown Macomb, but the M&WI rejected it due to operational issues that would come with such an agreement.

Entering October 1908, the railroad came up for sale by Brooks to find cash for Chandler's bankruptcy. William Compton, a former President of the M&WI, offered to buy the railroad for $125,000 (1908 USD), resigning as part of the effort. However, Compton could not raise necessary funds and his proposal failed. The Corn Exchange Bank forced Brooks to find a seller in February 1909 and threatened to foreclosure on the railroad. The bank brought in outside experts who stated that the railroad was worth about $70,000 in scrap. In April 1909, Brooks started negotiations with the bank to purchase its ownership in the M&WI and soon came to a deal. The new deal would result in Brooks acquiring the railroad's bonds for $20,000 and a property Chandler owned in the city of Chicago.

On December 22, 1909, the Chicago, Burlington and Quincy Railroad and the M&WI came to an agreement allowing the M&WI to move from their depot in the southern end of the city to the Burlington depot downtown. After years of failing to get a downtown depot of their own, including on three different attempts, the agreement ensured that passengers would have better access to the railroad. As part of the agreement, the Burlington would choose the times of trains operating on their property and no Macomb and Western Illinois Railroad tickets would be sold at the depot. All fares would instead be collected onboard trains. At the time of the agreement, the plans were only temporary, stating that patronage would determine if it continued, showing faith in the M&WI's loyal ridership.

== Transit connections ==
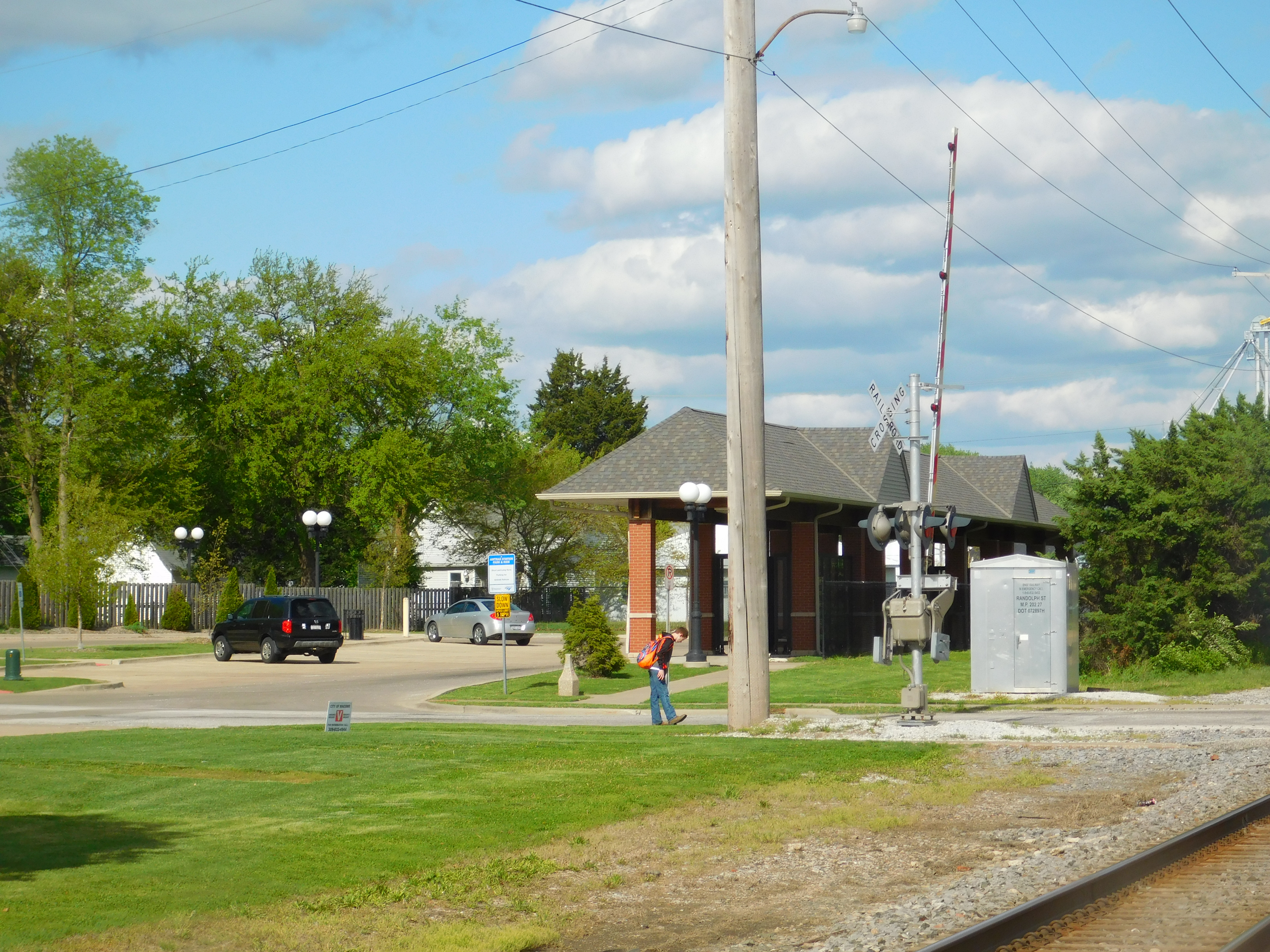
City Center bus station in 2017

Go West Transit operates bus services in the city of Macomb and maintains a transfer station on North Randolph Street, opened in November 2011. The transfer station provides access to buses from the Amtrak station and parking for Amtrak riders.

The following Routes service the City Center Bus Transfer Facility:

- 5 – Brown (City Center to Charles/Elting; City Center to Walgreens)
- 6 – Maroon (City Center to Walgreens; City Center to Aspen Court)
- 10 – Amtrak
- 15 – Brown West (City Center loop via Western Illinois University; East shared with 16)
- 16 – Maroon West (City Center loop via Western Illinois University; East shared with 15)
- 18 – South (City Center loop via McDonough District Hospital)
- 18 – Central (City Center loop via Spoon River College)
- 19 – Weekday Shuttle (City Center loop via Macomb High School)

== Bibliography ==
- Clarke, S.J. (1878). History of McDonough County, Illinois. Springfield, Illinois: D. W. Lusk, State Printer and Binder.
- Granacki Historic Consultants (2011). Architectural Resources in Downtown Macomb: A Summary and Inventory (PDF) (Report). City of Macomb.
- Hicks, Frank G. (2006). The Little Road: The Story of the Macomb, Industry & Littleton Railway. Macomb, Illinois: Western Illinois University.
