= West Quincy, Missouri =

Unincorporated community in Missouri, U.S.

Coordinates: 39°55′34″N 91°26′27″W

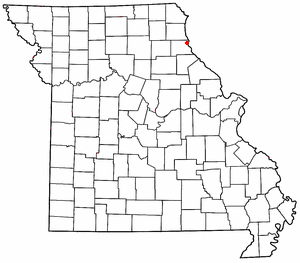

West Quincy is a small commercial area in northeastern Marion County, Missouri, United States, on U.S. Route 24. It has no permanent residents.

== History ==
West Quincy was platted in 1874, and named for its location across the Mississippi River from Quincy, Illinois. It is the location of the Lock and Dam No. 21 Historic District, listed on the National Register of Historic Places in 2004.

West Quincy station operated from 1860 to around 1939, and 1947 to 1993, serving the Chicago, Burlington and Quincy Railroad and later Amtrak.

The Knapheide corporation headquarters was formerly located in West Quincy, but it has relocated its main location to northern Quincy, Illinois. However, an active Knapheide facility still remains in West Quincy to this day. A tornado hit the drive-in theater and nearly crossed to Quincy but receded once it hit the bluffs.

During the Great Flood of 1993, the levee was sabotaged and water filled the floodplain, and a nearby barge was sucked into the break in the levee. It hit a local gas station and caused an explosion. Oil caught fire and the fire snaked across the water before it extinguished itself. All of the Quincy bridges—the only links across the river from Missouri to Illinois for 200 miles—were closed. One bridge, the Bayview Bridge, was closed for 71 days. This forced residents to drive to St. Louis or Burlington, Iowa, fly or take a ferry to get across the river.

A man from the Illinois side of the river, James Scott, was convicted of causing the flood and was sentenced to life in prison.

Today, West Quincy is home to a number of gas stations that largely serve consumers from Quincy. Missouri's lower state taxes on gasoline and cigarettes are the primary draw, as are the seasonal fireworks tents that spring up in the area during the summer. A number of other small businesses, including a pawn shop, a bank, and a number of car dealerships also operate in West Quincy.
