= Ottumwa station =

Amtrak intercity train station in Ottumwa, Iowa

Ottumwa, IA
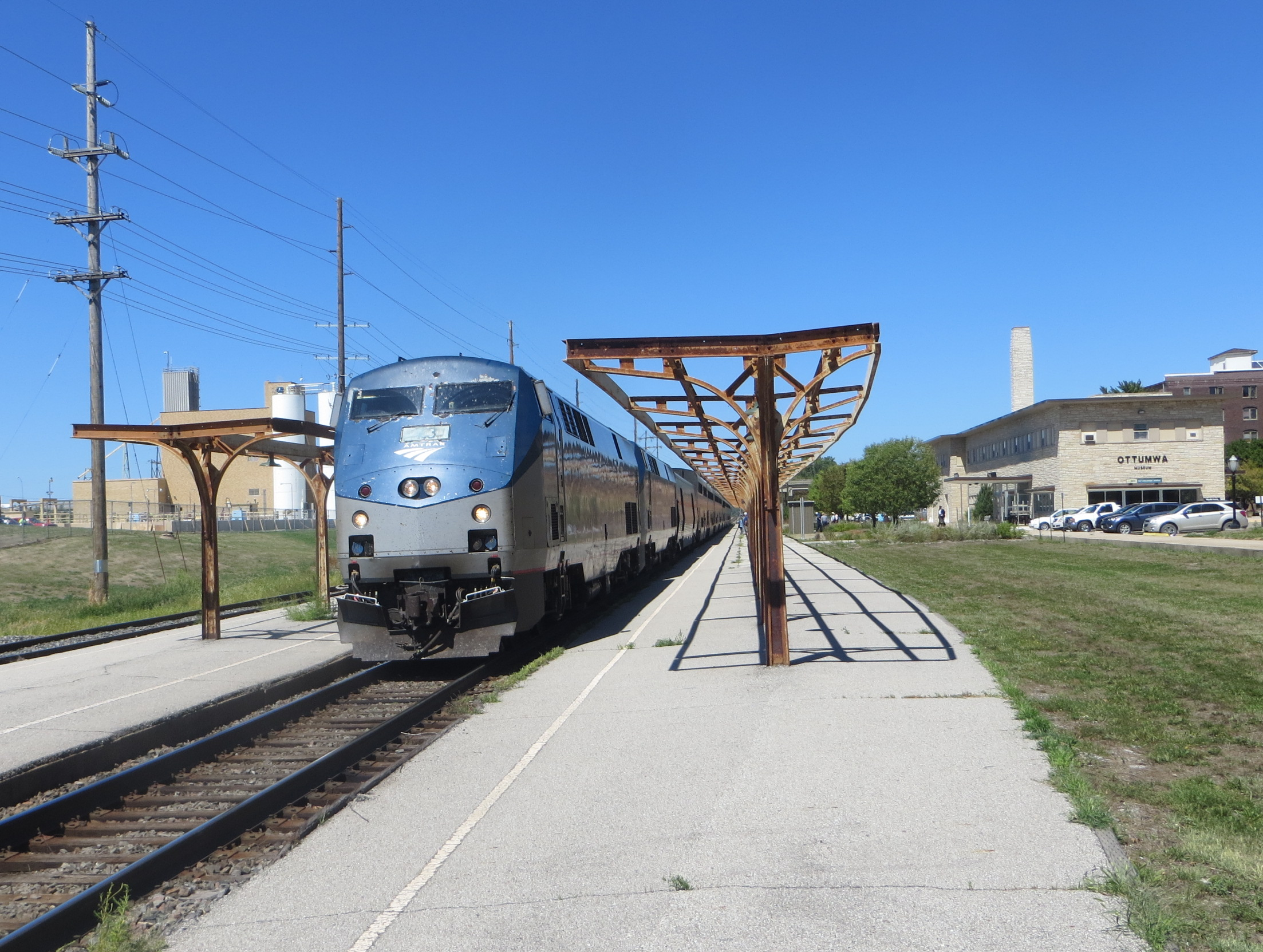
- The eastbound California Zephyr at Ottumwa in August 2017

General information
- Location: 210 West Main Street; Ottumwa, Iowa
- Platforms: 1 side platform, 1 island platform
- Tracks: 2

Construction
- Parking: Yes
- Accessible: yes

Other information
- Station code: Amtrak: OTM

History
- Rebuilt: May 26, 1951

Passengers
- FY 2025: 8,548 (Amtrak)

Services
Preceding station	Amtrak	Following station
Osceola toward Emeryville	California Zephyr	Mount Pleasant toward Chicago
Former services
Preceding station	Amtrak	Following station
Osceola toward Los Angeles	Desert Wind Discontinued in 1997	Mount Pleasant toward Chicago
Osceola toward Seattle	Pioneer Discontinued in 1997	Mount Pleasant toward Chicago
Preceding station	Burlington Route	Following station
Chillicothe toward Denver	Main Line	Agency City toward Chicago
Creston toward Oakland	California Zephyr	Fairfield toward Chicago
Preceding station	Chicago, Rock Island and Pacific Railroad	Following station
Kirkville toward Oskaloosa	Oskaloosa – Keokuk	Cliffland toward Keokuk
Preceding station	Milwaukee Road	Following station
At nearby Jefferson Street station
Ottumwa Sherman Street toward Kansas City or Savanna	Kansas City – Savanna	Reverses direction
Terminus	Ottumwa – Cedar Rapids	Ottumwa Sherman Street toward Cedar Rapids
Preceding station	Wabash Railroad	Following station
Carbon toward Moulton	Ottumwa Branch	Terminus
- Burlington Depot
- U.S. National Register of Historic Places
- U.S. Historic district – Contributing property
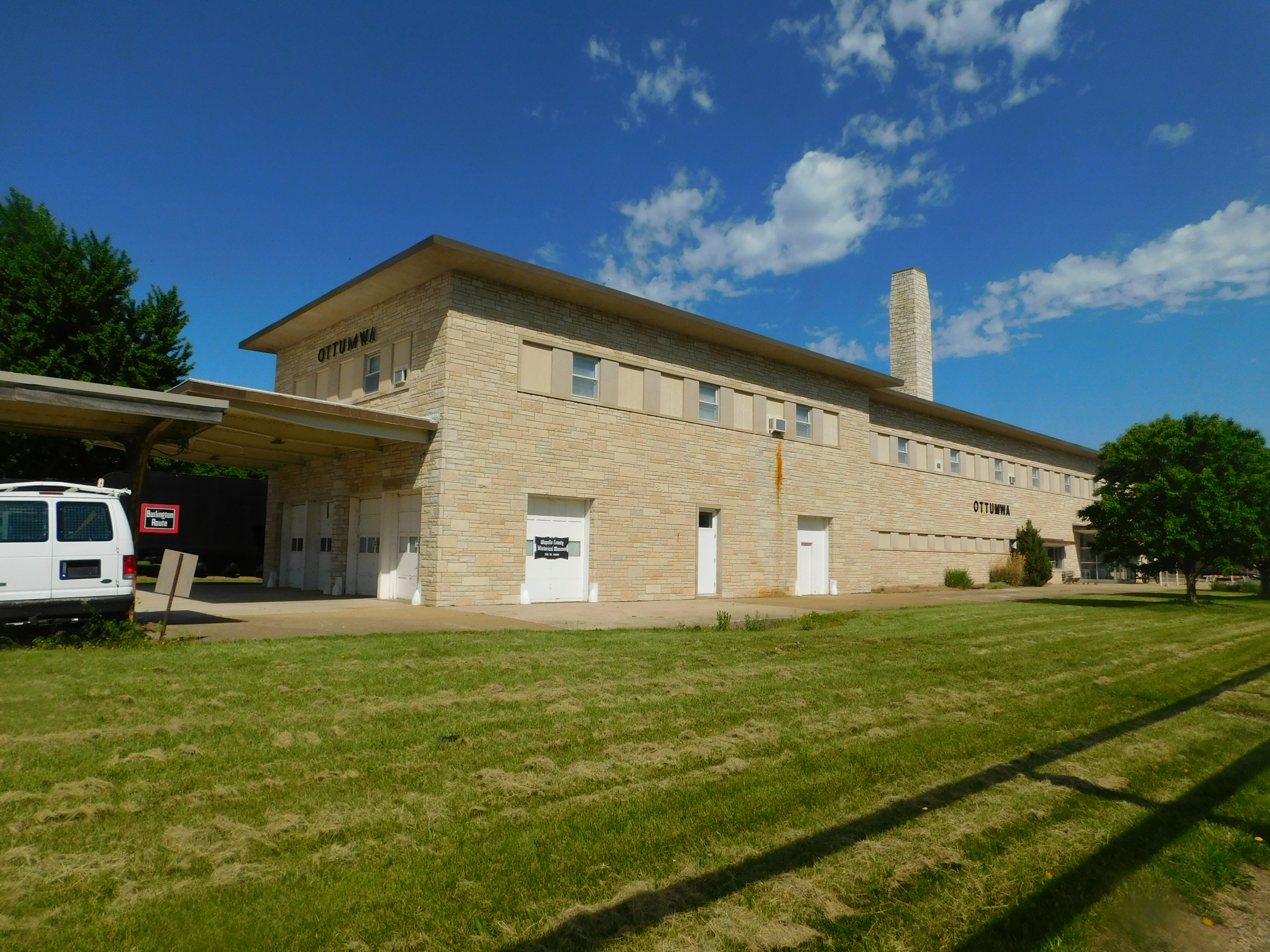
- The former Burlington depot, currently used by Amtrak.
- Interactive map of Burlington Depot
- Coordinates: 41.0186°N 92.4149°W
- Built: 1951
- Built by: Benson Const. Co.
- Architect: Holabird, Root & Burgee
- Architectural style: Modern Movement
- Part of: Historic Railroad District (ID11000723)
- NRHP reference No.: 08001100

Significant dates
- Added to NRHP: November 26, 2008
- Designated CP: October 6, 2011
Location

Ottumwa station is an Amtrak intercity train station in Ottumwa, Iowa, United States. The station was originally built by the Chicago, Burlington and Quincy Railroad, and has been listed as Burlington Depot by the National Register of Historic Places since November 26, 2008. It became a contributing property in the Historic Railroad District in 2011.

== History ==
The Burlington and Missouri River Railroad (B&M) reached Ottumwa from Burlington, Iowa in 1859, and the city remained the western terminus for the line until after the American Civil War. In the summer of 1865 work began to extend the line west of Ottumwa and it reached the Missouri River four years later. The Chicago, Burlington and Quincy Railroad (CB&Q) invested heavily in the project and took over the B&M in 1875. The CB&Q built a combination passenger and freight depot in Ottumwa in 1889. Its design was attributed to the Chicago architectural firm of Burnham and Root, who designed all of the railroad's larger depots. Ottumwa was the division point for the line. The CB&Q was one of five railroads that served the city, and it shared their depot with the Chicago, Rock Island and Pacific Railroad. This depot was known as Ottumwa Union Depot. The Chicago, Milwaukee, St. Paul and Pacific Railroad (Milwaukee Road) and Wabash Railroad served Ottumwa at a depot at Jefferson Street, listed as about .25 miles (0.40 km) away from the current station. The since-abandoned Milwaukee Road tracks were on a branch from its main line to Kansas City, which ran through Ottumwa on the northwest side of town. The Wabash Railroad tracks ended at Ottumwa, and crossed the Des Moines River on a bridge that has been repurposed into a trail.

After World War II Ottumwa experienced a building boom, and the CB&Q decided to replace its depot with a modern one. The Chicago architectural firm of Holabird, Root & Burgee designed the new depot as well new depot in Burlington, Iowa in 1943. That depot was the standard used to design other CB&Q depots after the war with Ottumwa being one. The new Ottumwa depot was completed in 1951 by Benson Construction Company using the limestone foundation of the old depot and its exterior walls. None of the old depot is visible today. During construction, the railroad used two passenger cars as ticket office and waiting room. Ballingall Park in front of the depot was completed at the same time. The present depot is a two-story structure designed in a simple Modernist style. The rectangular building features a flat roof, broad eaves, banded windows and an exterior clad with ashlar Lannon stone.

== Transit connections ==
The Ottumwa Transit Authority East-West Route stops near the station. However, under the current California Zephyr schedule, Emeryville-bound trains arrive almost an hour after the system ends its daily operations.

In addition, intercity buses operated by Burlington Trailways stop two blocks away at the corner of Market Street and Main Street.
