= Mount Pleasant station (Iowa) =

Amtrak station in Iowa

Mount Pleasant, IA
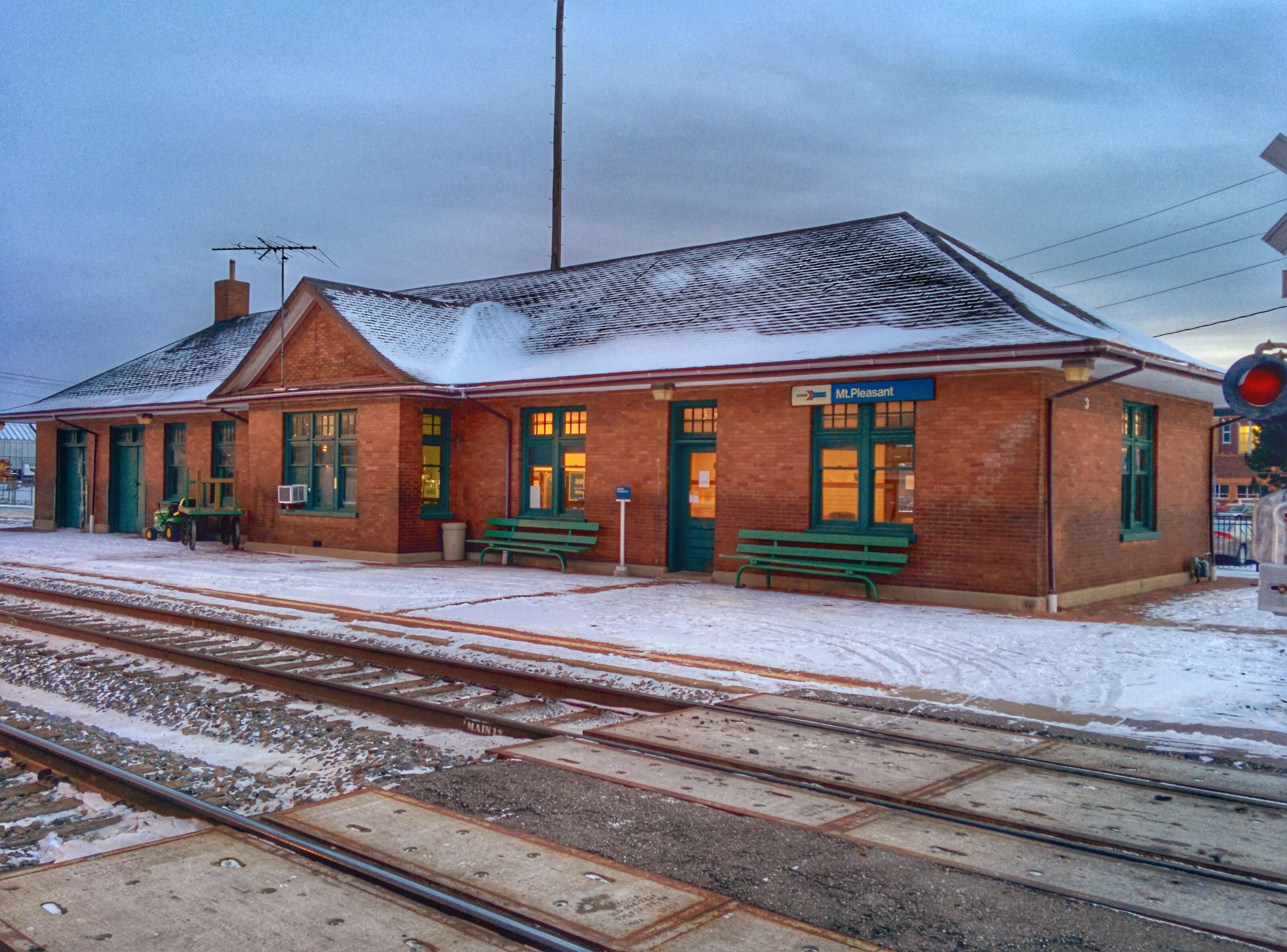
- The station building

General information
- Location: 418 North Adams Street; Mount Pleasant, Iowa
- Coordinates: 40.9713°N 91.5506°W
- Platforms: 2 side platforms
- Tracks: 2

Other information
- Station code: Amtrak: MTP

Passengers
- FY 2025: 9,228 (Amtrak)

Services
Preceding station	Amtrak	Following station
Ottumwa toward Emeryville	California Zephyr	Burlington toward Chicago
Former services
Preceding station	Amtrak	Following station
Ottumwa toward Los Angeles	Desert Wind Discontinued in 1997	Burlington toward Chicago
Ottumwa toward Seattle	Pioneer Discontinued in 1997	Burlington toward Chicago
Preceding station	Burlington Route	Following station
Rome toward Denver	Main Line	New London toward Chicago
Fairfield toward Oakland	California Zephyr	Burlington toward Chicago
Location

Mount Pleasant station is an Amtrak intercity train station in Mount Pleasant, Iowa. The Chicago, Burlington and Quincy Railroad built the pressed brick depot in 1912. The contractors were J. Louis Whitney and K.A. Bergdah, two prominent Mt. Pleasant builders at that time. Using funds received under the American Recovery and Reinvestment Act of 2009, Amtrak installed a new wheelchair lift and enclosure at the station in 2010.

The Mount Pleasant station has a waiting area and lobby open to the public 365 days a year. There is no ticket office or baggage in Mount Pleasant.

Mount Pleasant is also served by intercity buses from Burlington Trailways. However, the intercity bus stop is located 1.8 miles (2.9 km) east of Mount Pleasant station, at the Heidelburg Motel at 2005 East Washington Street.
