= Osceola station =

Amtrak intercity train station in Osceola, Iowa

Osceola, IA
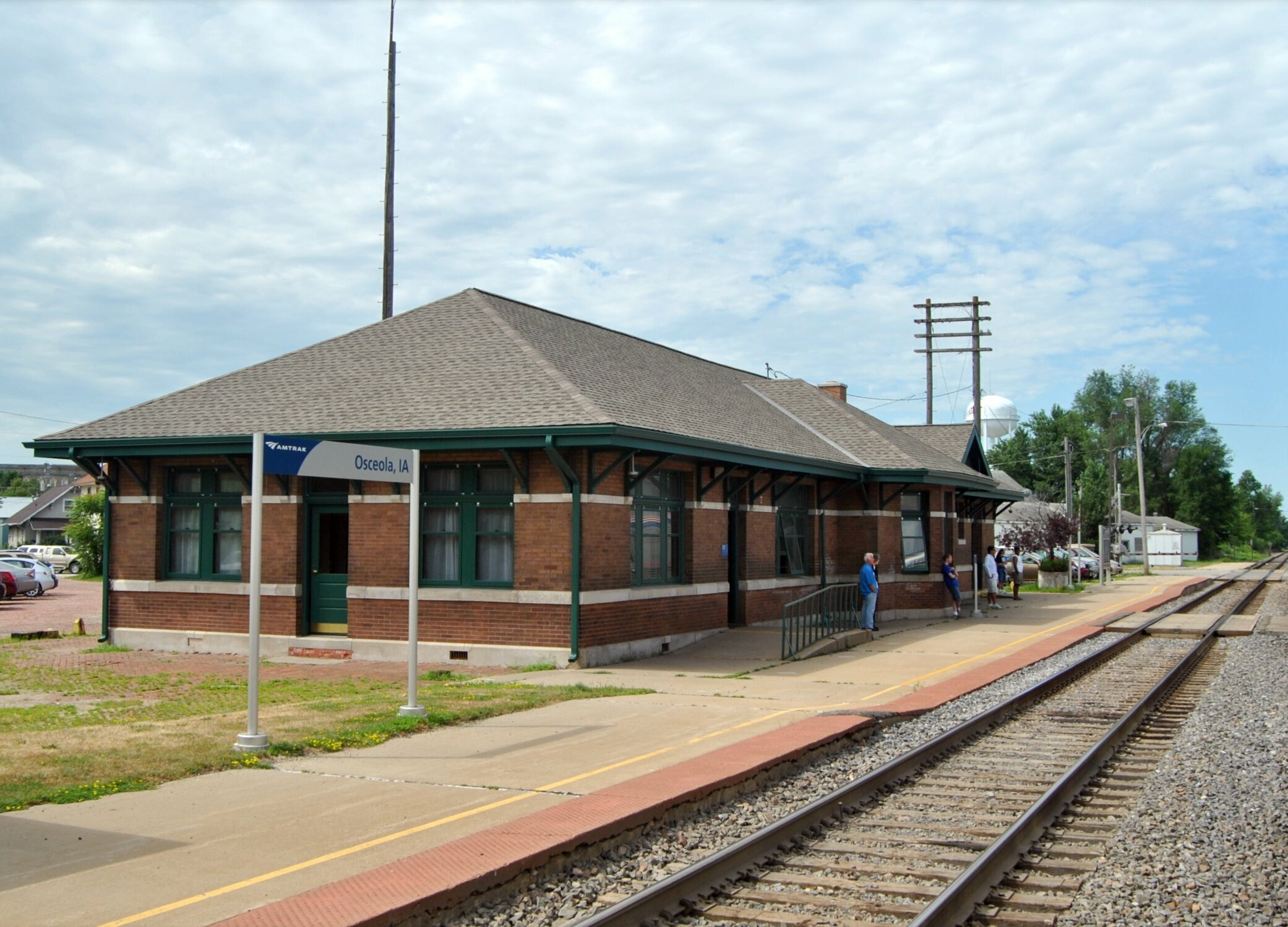
- Osceola station in July 2011

General information
- Location: Main and East Clay Streets; Osceola, Iowa
- Coordinates: 41.0372°N 93.7650°W
- Owner: City of Osceola
- Platforms: 2 side platforms
- Tracks: 2

Other information
- Station code: Amtrak: OSC

History
- Rebuilt: 1907

Passengers
- FY 2025: 13,580 (Amtrak)

Services
| Preceding station | Amtrak | Following station |
|---|---|---|
| Creston toward Emeryville | California Zephyr | Ottumwa toward Chicago |
Former services
| Preceding station | Amtrak | Following station |
|---|---|---|
| Creston toward Los Angeles | Desert Wind Discontinued in 1997 | Ottumwa toward Chicago |
| Creston toward Seattle | Pioneer Discontinued in 1997 | Ottumwa toward Chicago |
| Preceding station | Burlington Route | Following station |
| Murray toward Denver | Main Line | Lucas toward Chicago |
| Terminus | Des Moines-Osceola | New Virginia toward Des Moines |
- Chicago, Burlington and Quincy Depot
- U.S. National Register of Historic Places
- Interactive map of Chicago, Burlington and Quincy Depot
- NRHP reference No.: 08001283
- Added to NRHP: January 8, 2009
Location

Osceola station is an Amtrak intercity train station in Osceola, Iowa, United States served by Amtrak. Osceola is the closest Amtrak station to Des Moines, Iowa's capital and most populous city, which is about 50 miles (80 km) to the north. The station is listed on the National Register of Historic Places as Chicago, Burlington and Quincy Depot.

== History ==
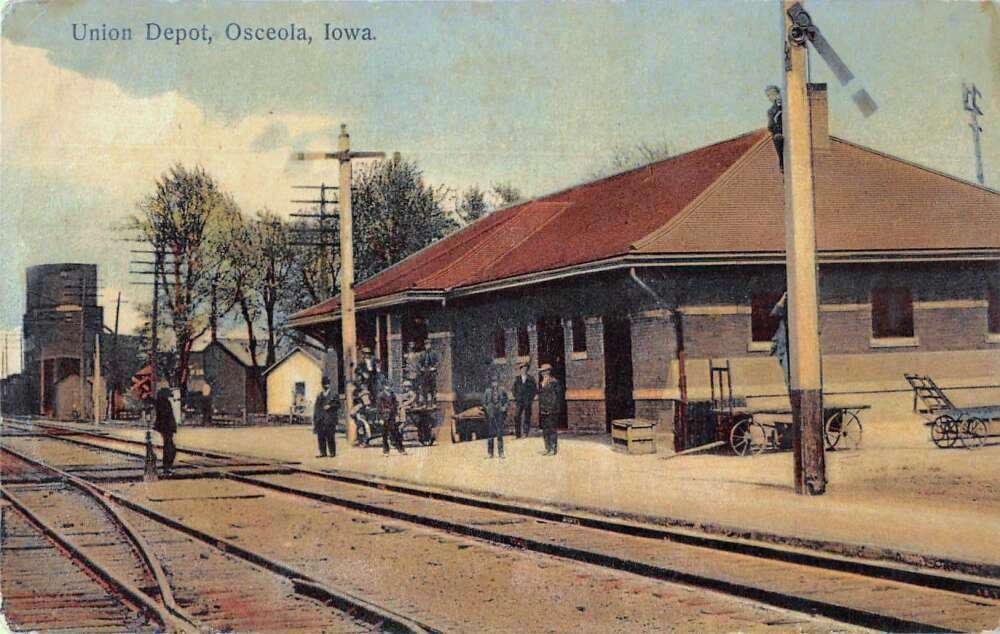
A 1908 postcard of the station

The Osceola station was built in 1907 by the Chicago, Burlington and Quincy Railroad (CB&Q), replacing an earlier wood station. Designed in the Prairie Style, the reddish-brown brick depot has a low slung, horizontal profile reinforced by the limestone water table and belt courses that wrap around the building. Originally a combination depot, the building contained freight and passenger areas under one roof. The ticket office retains many original features, such as ticket windows, wood benches and light fixtures.

It passed to Burlington Northern in 1970 upon the Q's merger with Great Northern and Northern Pacific, and became part of the BNSF Railway in 1995. In 2007, following a decade of talks with BNSF, the city of Osceola gained ownership of the historic building. Working with an architect specializing in historic preservation, the city planned a multi-phase restoration of the depot and parking area to create an intermodal transportation hub to better serve Amtrak and intercity bus riders.

The restoration of the exterior was funded in part by $600,000 in federal funds obtained through the Iowa Department of Transportation. This project included the installation of a new roof, reconstruction of a damaged chimney, restoration of existing windows, installation of new historically appropriate storm windows, manufacture of new entry doors that match the originals, re-pointing of the mortar that holds the bricks in place, and general rehabilitation and cleaning of the brick and stone surfaces. City officials also hope to restore the interior if funding can be found. According to the proposal, the former freight area would become the new waiting room and might accommodate local history displays; in turn, the former waiting room would become a small museum, restaurant, or other retail space.
