= Keokuk Union Depot =

- U.S. National Register of Historic Places
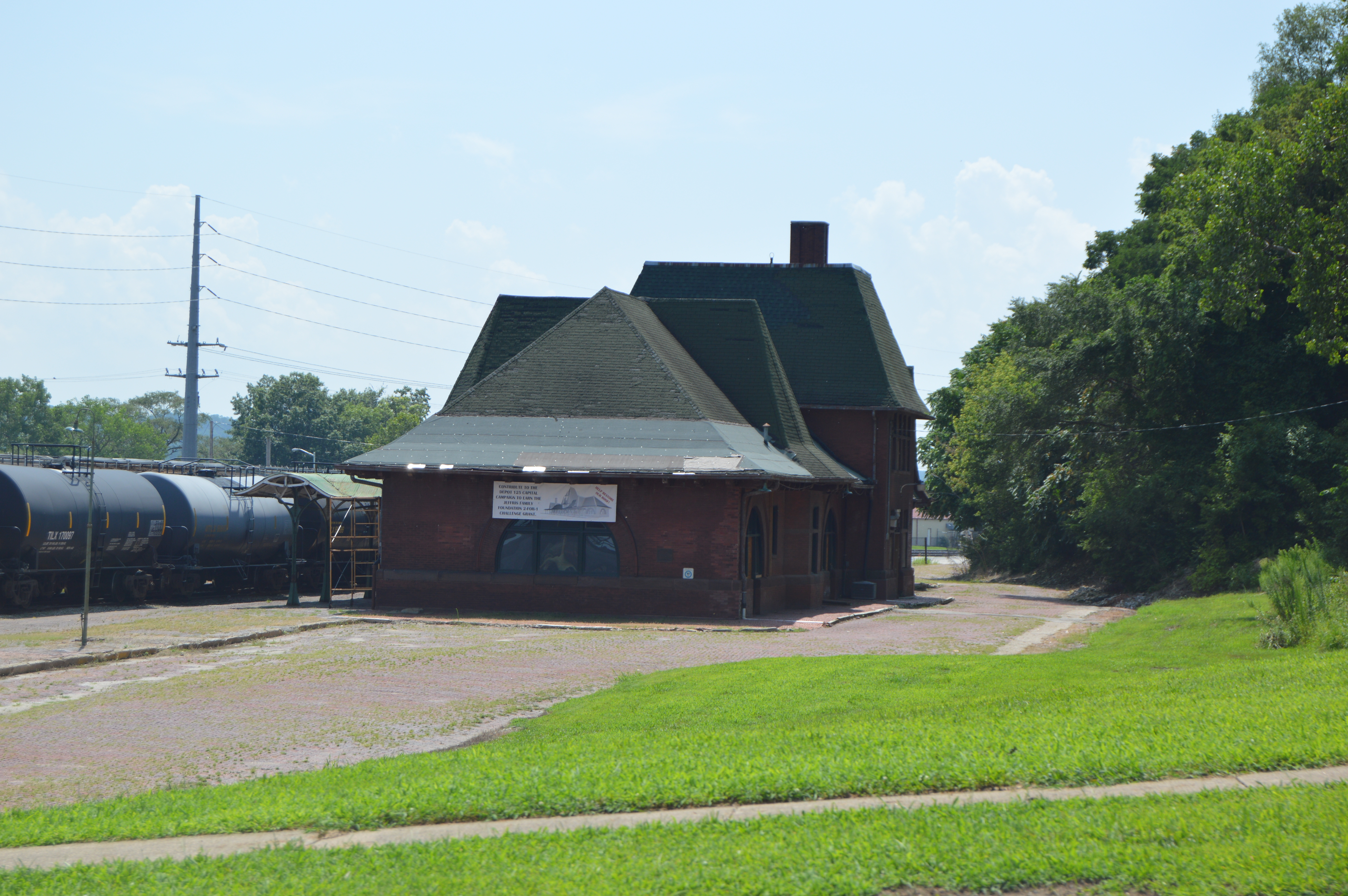

- Location within Iowa Location within the United States
- Location: 200 Exchange St. Keokuk, Iowa
- Coordinates: 40°23′26″N 91°22′54″W
- Area: 1 acre (0.40 ha)
- Built: 1890-1891
- Built by: Grace & Hyde Company
- Architect: John Wellborn Root; Herbert William Chamberlain
- Architectural style: Romanesque Revival
- NRHP reference No.: 13000109
- Added to NRHP: March 27, 2013

Keokuk Union Depot is a historic train station on the west bank of the Mississippi River near downtown Keokuk, Iowa, United States. It was built from 1890 to 1891, and it was listed on the National Register of Historic Places in 2013.

== History ==
This rail depot was a part of the expansion of rail facilities in the late 19th century when the railroad's expanded to maximize transportation and commerce opportunities. Prior to the Union Depot's construction, Keokuk was served by deplorable rail facilities that were described as being little more than shanties. Five railroads banded together to form the Keokuk Union Depot Company: the Keokuk & Western Railroad, the St. Louis, Keokuk & Northwestern Railroad, the Chicago, Rock Island & Pacific Railroad (Rock Island line), the Toledo, Peoria & Western Railway, and the Wabash Railroad. They hired Chicago architect John Wellborn Root from Burnham & Root to design the Romanesque Revival depot. It was one of the last buildings he designed before his death. Herbert William Chamberlain, of the same firm, served as supervising architect. Ten years after it opened the Keokuk & Western Railroad and the St. Louis, Keokuk & Northwestern Railroad were absorbed into the Chicago, Burlington & Quincy Railroad (CB&Q), which then operated from here. Keokuk was a stop for the Mark Twain Zephyr (CB&Q) between Burlington, Iowa and St. Louis, and the Zephyr Rocket, a joint venture of the CB&Q and the Rock Island line between Minneapolis and St. Louis.

Passenger rail service ended at the depot in 1967, after which it was used by the railroads as a headquarters for their agents and operators. The Keokuk Junction Railway (KJRY) acquired the local yard trackage and switching rights from the bankrupt Rock Island lines, and in 1981 they bought all of the shares of the Keokuk Union Depot Company. The depot was used by the KJRY as the base for their tourist train operations, and its trolley rides across the Mississippi into Illinois. Pioneer Railcorp acquired the Keokuk Junction Railway's assets in 1996. They used the old depot for storage until 2011 when they conveyed the depot and the adjacent land to the City of Keokuk for 99 years. The city formed the Depot Commission to oversee the management and preservation of the facility. A non-profit organization, the Keokuk Union Depot Foundation, was established the following year to raise the necessary funds to preserve and run the depot.

== Architecture ==
The depot is a Late Victorian style, Romanesque Revival, brick structure with sandstone trim. It features an asymmetrical elevation that includes a peaked roof in the middle and round-arched window and door openings. It is built on a limestone foundation. A steel, curvilinear-roofed canopy that provided shelter for passengers and freight runs the length of the depot on the east side. The interior features solid oak trusses and a built-in ticket booth and restrooms.

| Preceding station | Burlington Route | Following station |
|---|---|---|
| Montrose toward Burlington | Burlington – St. Louis | Alexandria toward St. Louis |
| Alexandria toward Shenandoah | Shenandoah – Keokuk | Terminus |
| Preceding station | Chicago, Rock Island and Pacific Railroad | Following station |
| Sand Prairie toward Oskaloosa | Oskaloosa – Keokuk | Terminus |
