= Omaha station =

Amtrak train station in Omaha, Nebraska

Omaha, NE
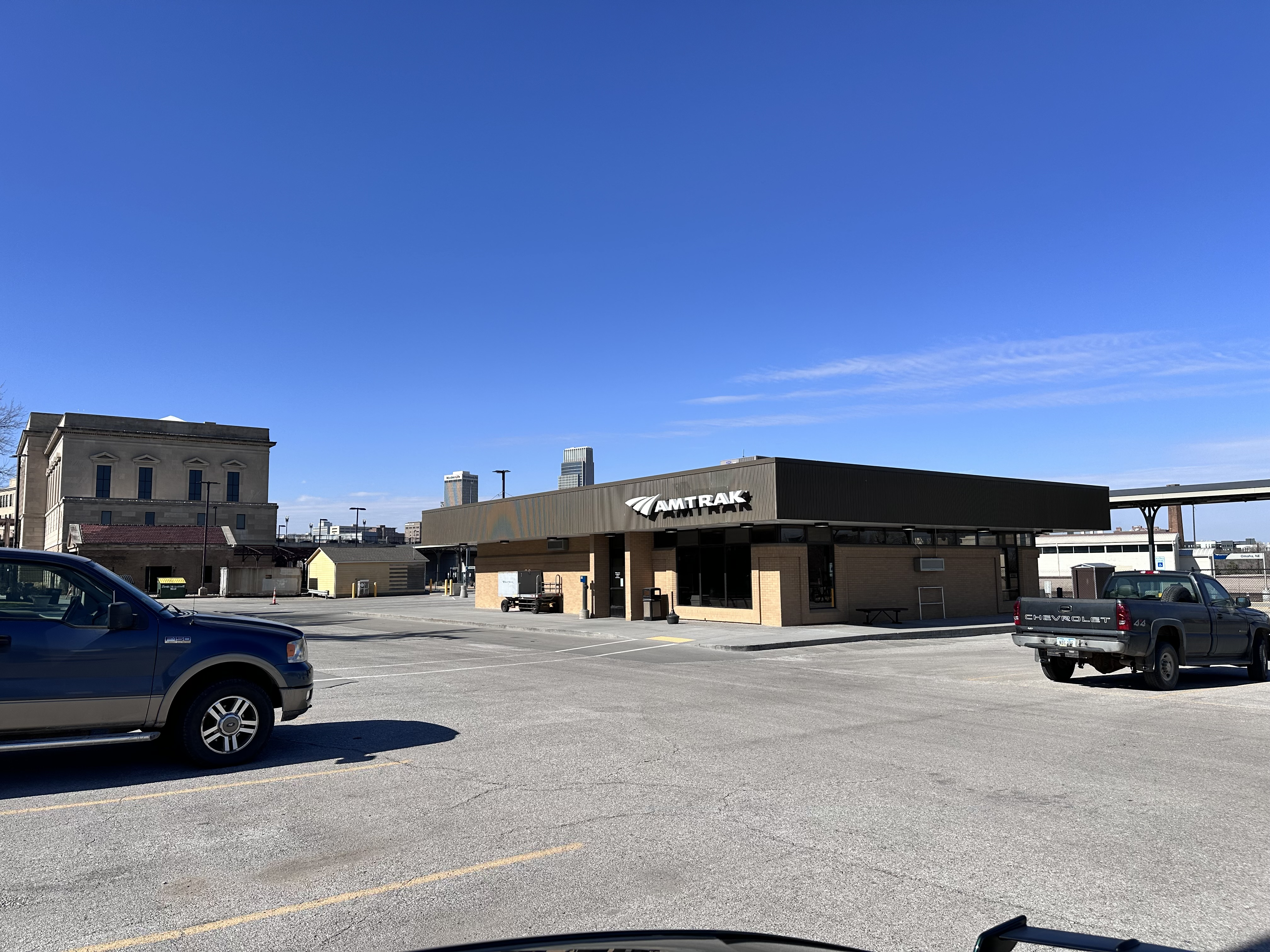
- Amtrak's Omaha station in 2024. The former Burlington Station is visible on the left.

General information
- Location: 1003 South 9th Street; Omaha, Nebraska
- Coordinates: 41.2498°N 95.9272°W
- Owner: Amtrak
- Platforms: 1 side platform
- Tracks: 1

Construction
- Accessible: Yes

Other information
- Station code: Amtrak: OMA

History
- Opened: 1983

Passengers
- FY 2025: 25,946 (Amtrak)

Services
Preceding station	Amtrak	Following station
Lincoln toward Emeryville	California Zephyr	Creston toward Chicago
Former services
Preceding station	Amtrak	Following station
Lincoln toward Los Angeles	Desert Wind Discontinued in 1997	Creston toward Chicago
Lincoln toward Seattle	Pioneer Discontinued in 1997	Creston toward Chicago
Location

Omaha station is an Amtrak intercity train station in Omaha, Nebraska, United States. It is served daily by the California Zephyr.

The station was built in 1983, replacing trailers that Amtrak had used as a temporary station since 1974, when it discontinued use of the historic Burlington Station immediately to the west. The station uses the Type 50C specification of Amtrak's standard design; it has a capacity of 50.

Omaha station is not directly served by local public transit provider Metro Transit. The closest bus stop is four blocks away at the intersection of South 13th Street and Pacific Street.

== See also ==
- Omaha Union Station
- Omaha Burlington Station
- Webster Street station
