= Creston station =

Railway station in Creston, Iowa

Creston, IA
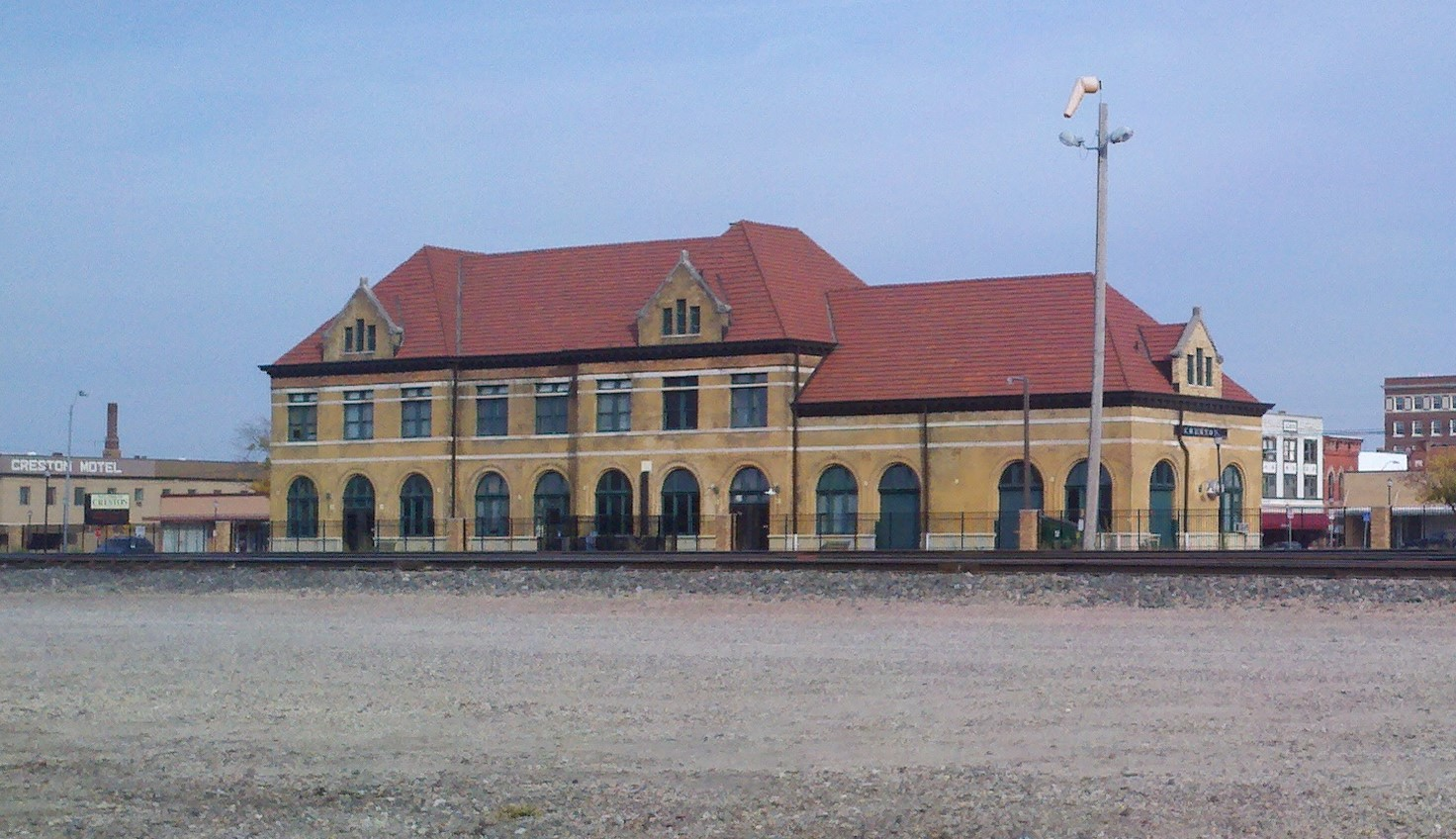
- The historic station in 2012

General information
- Location: Pine Avenue and Adams Street; Creston, Iowa; United States
- Coordinates: 41.0570°N 94.3614°W
- Owner: City of Creston
- Platforms: 1 side platform, 1 island platform
- Tracks: 2

Construction
- Parking: Yes
- Accessible: Yes

Other information
- Station code: Amtrak: CRN

History
- Opened: 1899
- Rebuilt: 1969, 2019

Passengers
- FY 2025: 2,174 (Amtrak)

Services
Preceding station	Amtrak	Following station
Omaha toward Emeryville	California Zephyr	Osceola toward Chicago
Former services
Preceding station	Amtrak	Following station
Omaha toward Los Angeles	Desert Wind Discontinued in 1997	Osceola toward Chicago
Omaha toward Seattle	Pioneer Discontinued in 1997	Osceola toward Chicago
Preceding station	Burlington Route	Following station
Omaha toward Denver	Main Line	Afton toward Chicago
Omaha toward Oakland	California Zephyr	Ottumwa toward Chicago
Kent toward St. Joseph	St. Joseph – Creston	Terminus
Spaulding toward Cumberland	Cumberland Branch	Terminus
- Chicago, Burlington and Quincy Railroad-Creston Station
- U.S. National Register of Historic Places
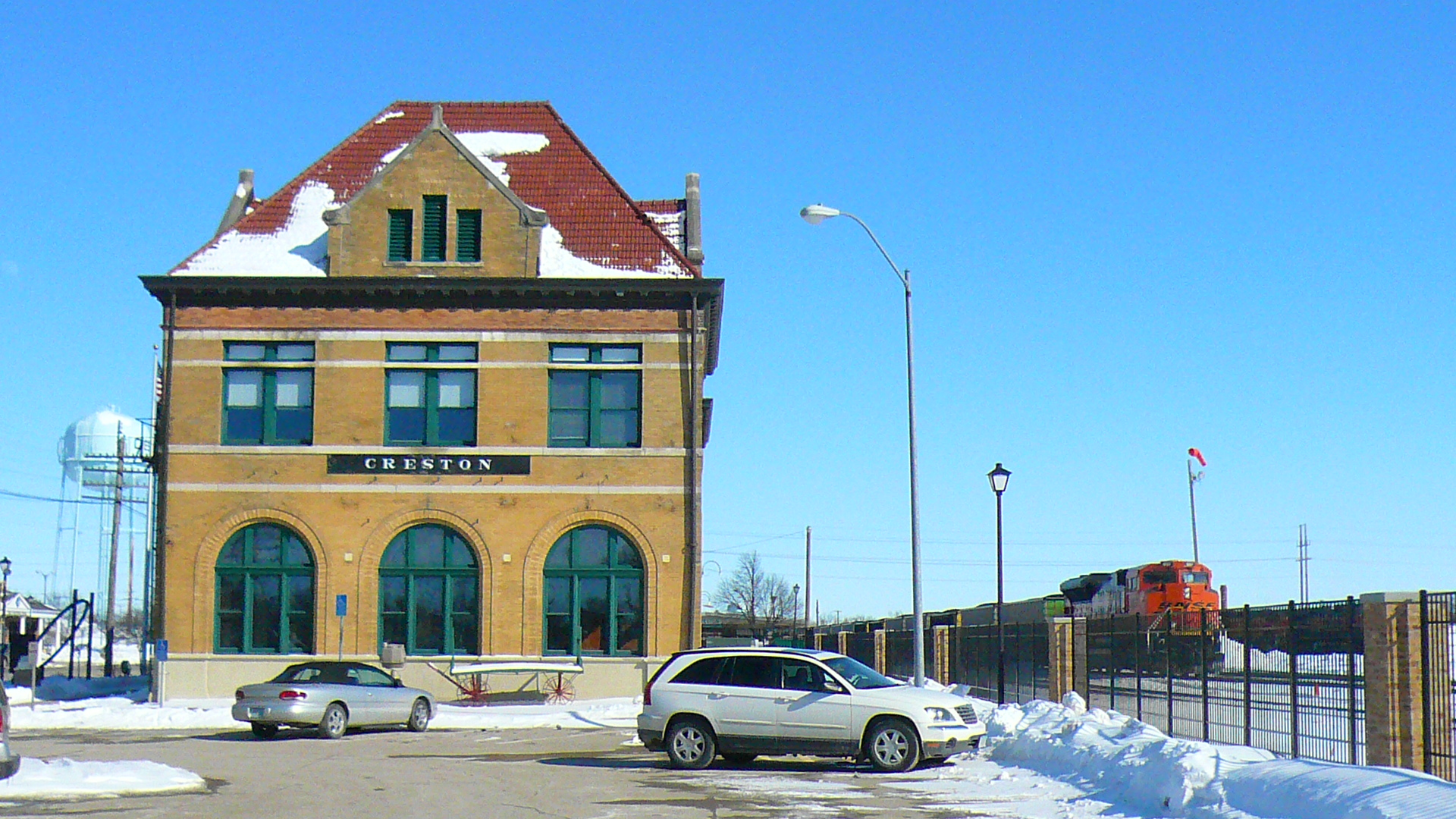
- Interactive map of Chicago, Burlington and Quincy Railroad-Creston Station
- Built: 1899
- Architect: Burnham and Root
- NRHP reference No.: 73000739
- Added to NRHP: August 15, 1973
Location

Creston station is an Amtrak intercity train station in Creston, Iowa. The station is served by the Chicago–San Francisco Bay Area California Zephyr. Constructed by the Chicago, Burlington and Quincy Railroad (CB&Q) and opened in 1899, the station is listed on the National Register of Historic Places as the Chicago, Burlington and Quincy Railroad-Creston Station. Amtrak moved to the historic station in 2019 from a small station immediately to its east that had been used since 1969. Creston station is also used by the city of Creston as a city hall and community center, known as the Creston Municipal Complex.

== History ==
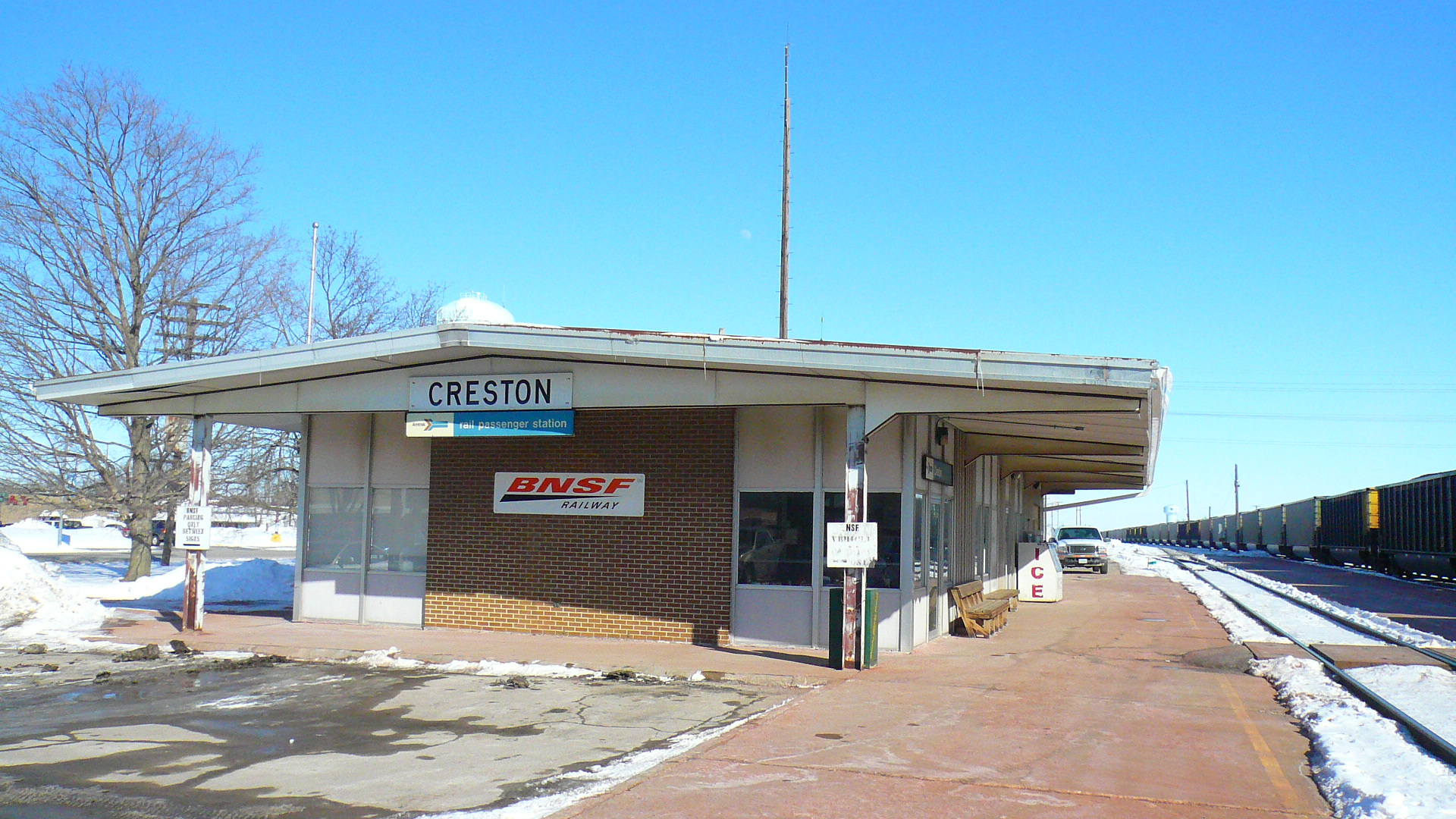
The nearby 1969-built station in 2010, then still in operation

The station was built by the Chicago, Burlington and Quincy Railroad (CB&Q) in 1899 for $75,000. The Chicago architectural firm of Burnham and Root, who designed many of the CB&Q's stations, designed this station as well. Creston was a division headquarters, therefore all of the railroad's business in southwest Iowa operated from here. It also housed the office of the Master Carpenter, who oversaw all section and bridge work for the division, and the office of the trainmaster, who oversaw the switching and forming of trains in the Creston yards. In addition to the CB&Q mainline, two branch lines originated from here, and another railroad operated from the depot as well. Creston also had various maintenance shops and contained a roundhouse; both have since been demolished or destroyed by a tornado.

With passenger rail service in the United States declining rapidly in the 1960s, the large Creston station was deemed too expensive to maintain. In 1969, the CB&Q built a small brick and steel depot to the east of the original station which was later used by Amtrak after its creation in 1971. The original station was sold to the city of Creston for $1.

In 1970, Creston's mayor noted that the station would be a good site for a parking lot. Local residents launched a "Save the Depot Committee", gathering 700 letters of support, and voted for a bond to support its renovation. The station was also added to the National Register of Historic Places in 1973. With its future secure, the station was renovated and reopened in December 1978 with community rooms on the first floor and city government offices on the second floor.

In 2017, Amtrak signed a 20-year lease with Creston for use of the historic station. Following $1.3 million in improvements including making its waiting room accessible, Amtrak relocated to it on August 1, 2019; the nearby platforms of the 1969 station remain in use.
