= Creston, Iowa =

- City
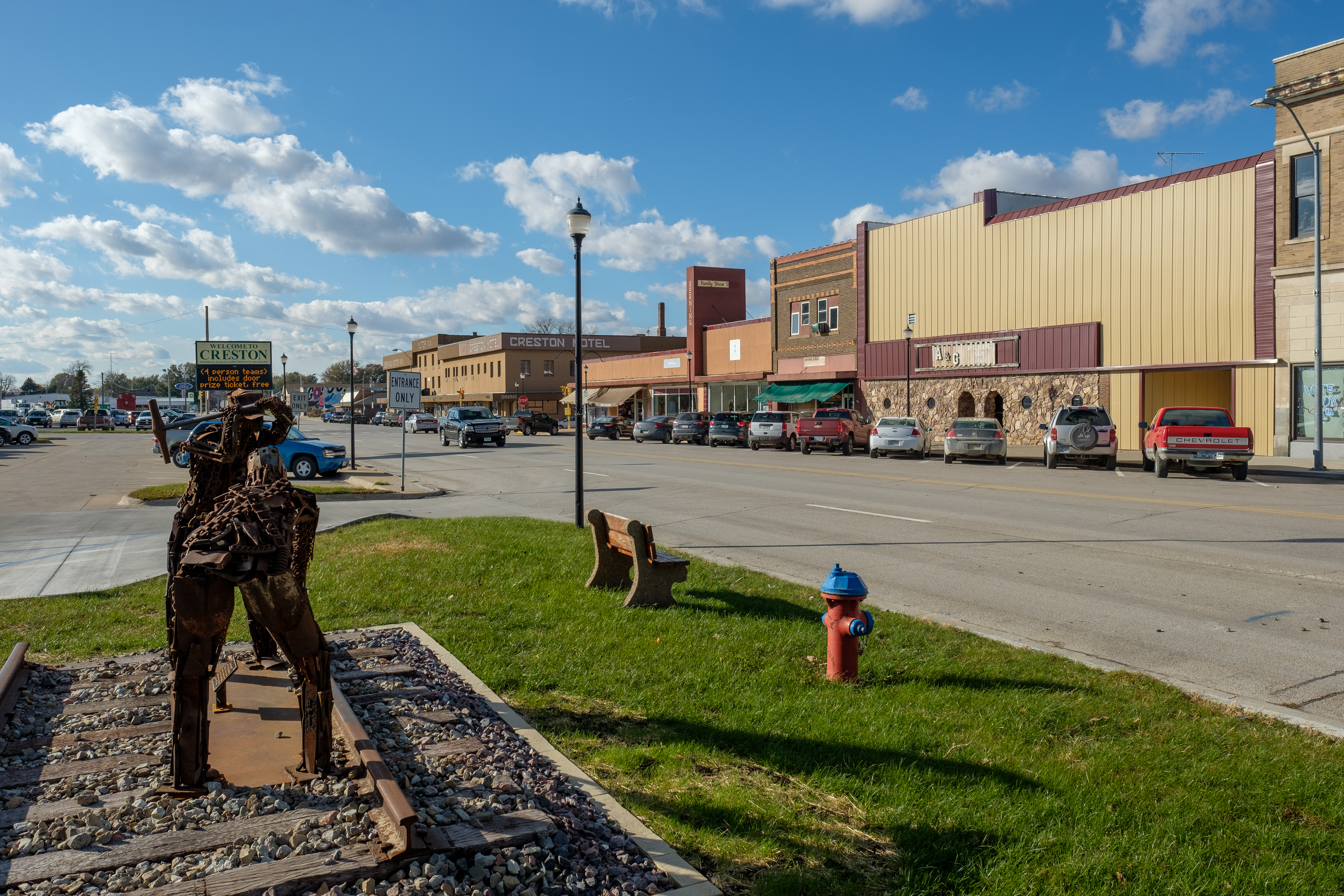
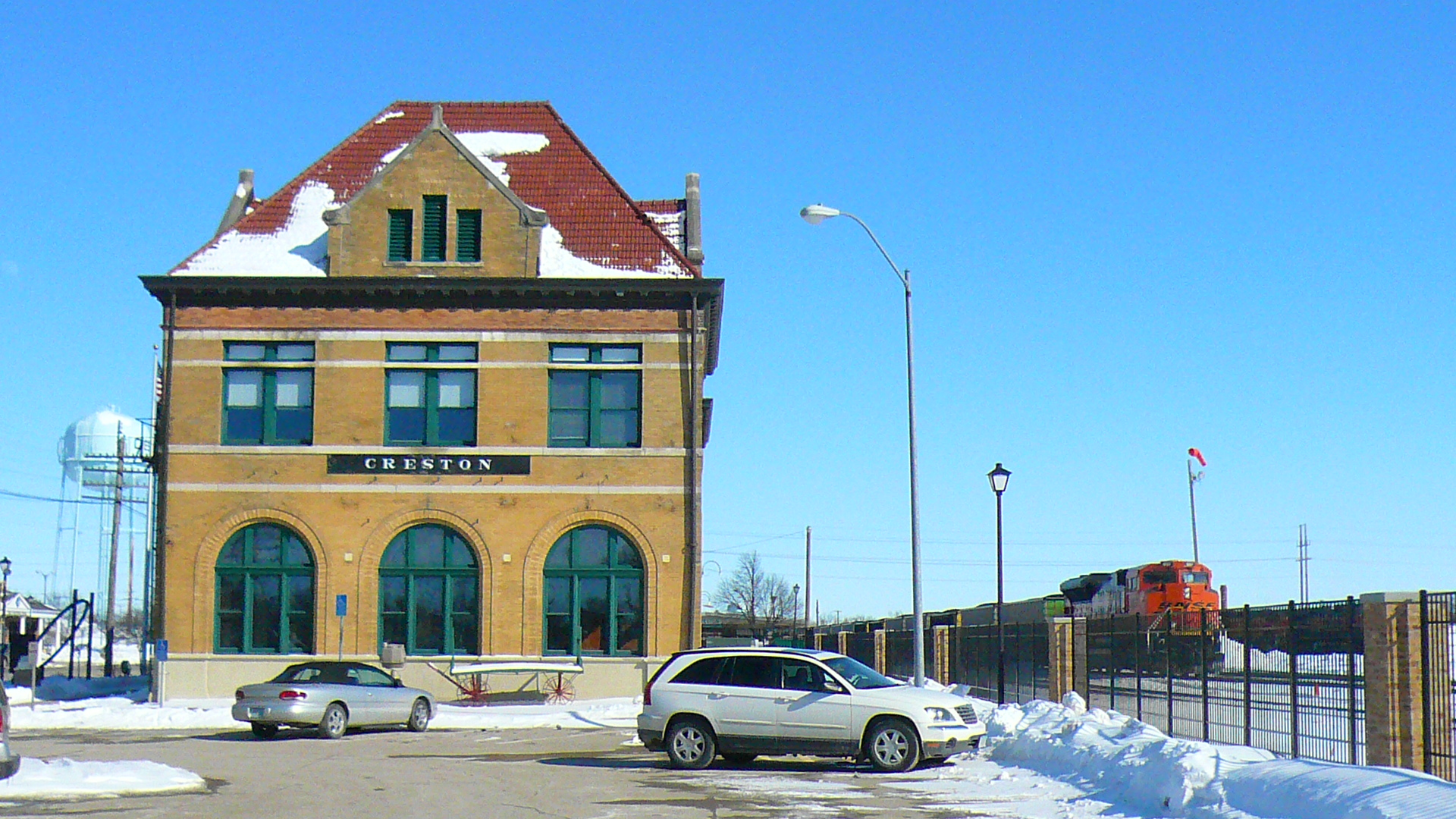
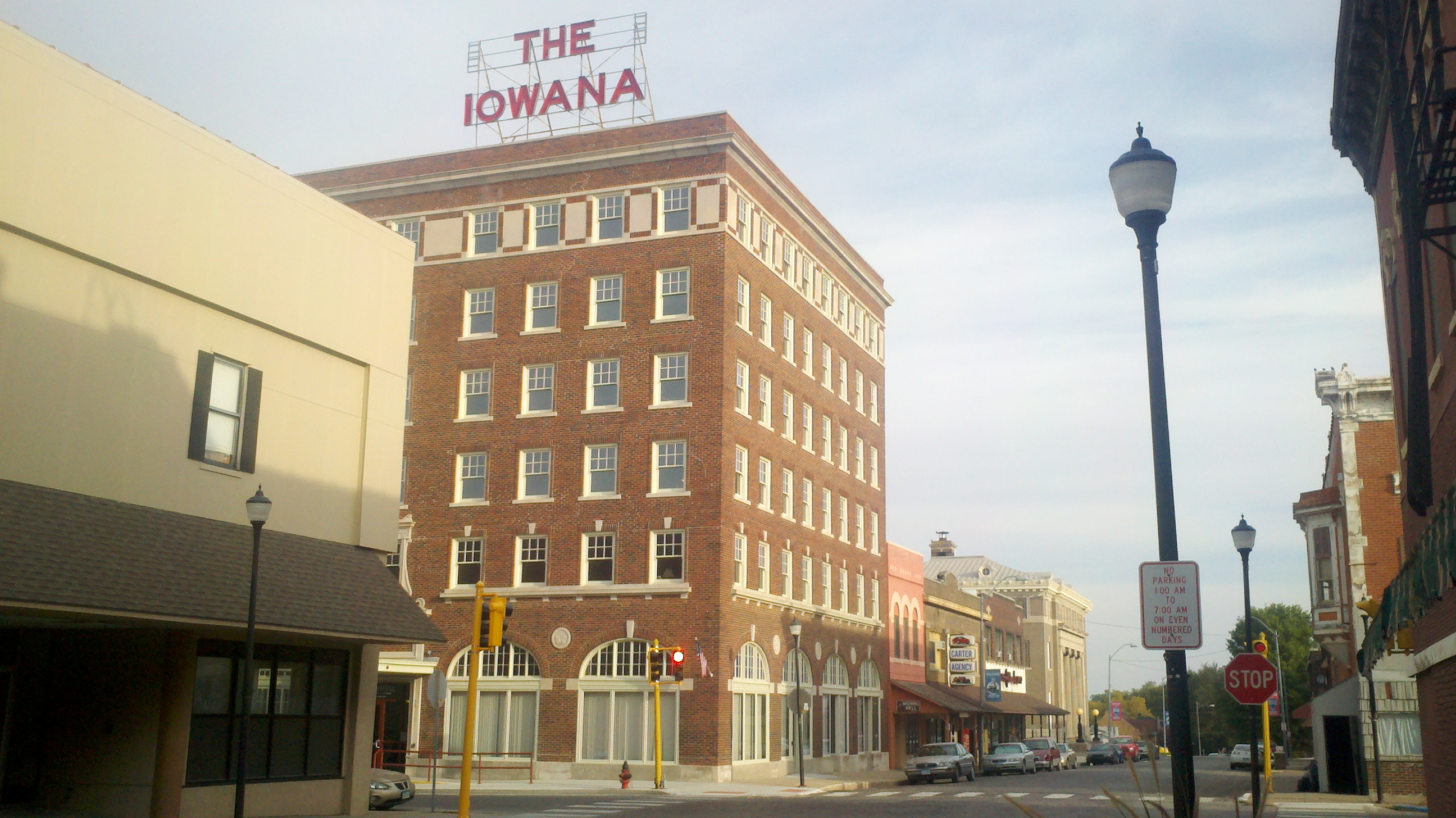
- Downtown Creston Creston Amtrak Station Iowana Hotel

- Location of Creston, Iowa
- Coordinates: 41°03′35″N 94°21′54″W
- Country: US
- State: Iowa
- County: Union
- Established: 1869

Area
  - Total: 5.25 sq mi (13.60 km^{2})
  - Land: 5.19 sq mi (13.44 km^{2})
  - Water: 0.062 sq mi (0.16 km^{2})
- Elevation: 1,283 ft (391 m)

Population (2020)
  - Total: 7,536
  - Density: 1,452.4/sq mi (560.78/km^{2})
- Time zone: UTC-6 (Central (CST))
  - Summer (DST): UTC-5 (CDT)
- ZIP code: 50801
- Area code: 641
- FIPS code: 19-17265
- GNIS feature ID: 467666
- Website: www.crestoniowa.gov

Creston is a city in and the county seat of Union County, Iowa. The population was 7,536 at the time of the 2020 Census. Creston is a regional hub for southwest Iowa and is home to Southwestern Community College.

== History ==
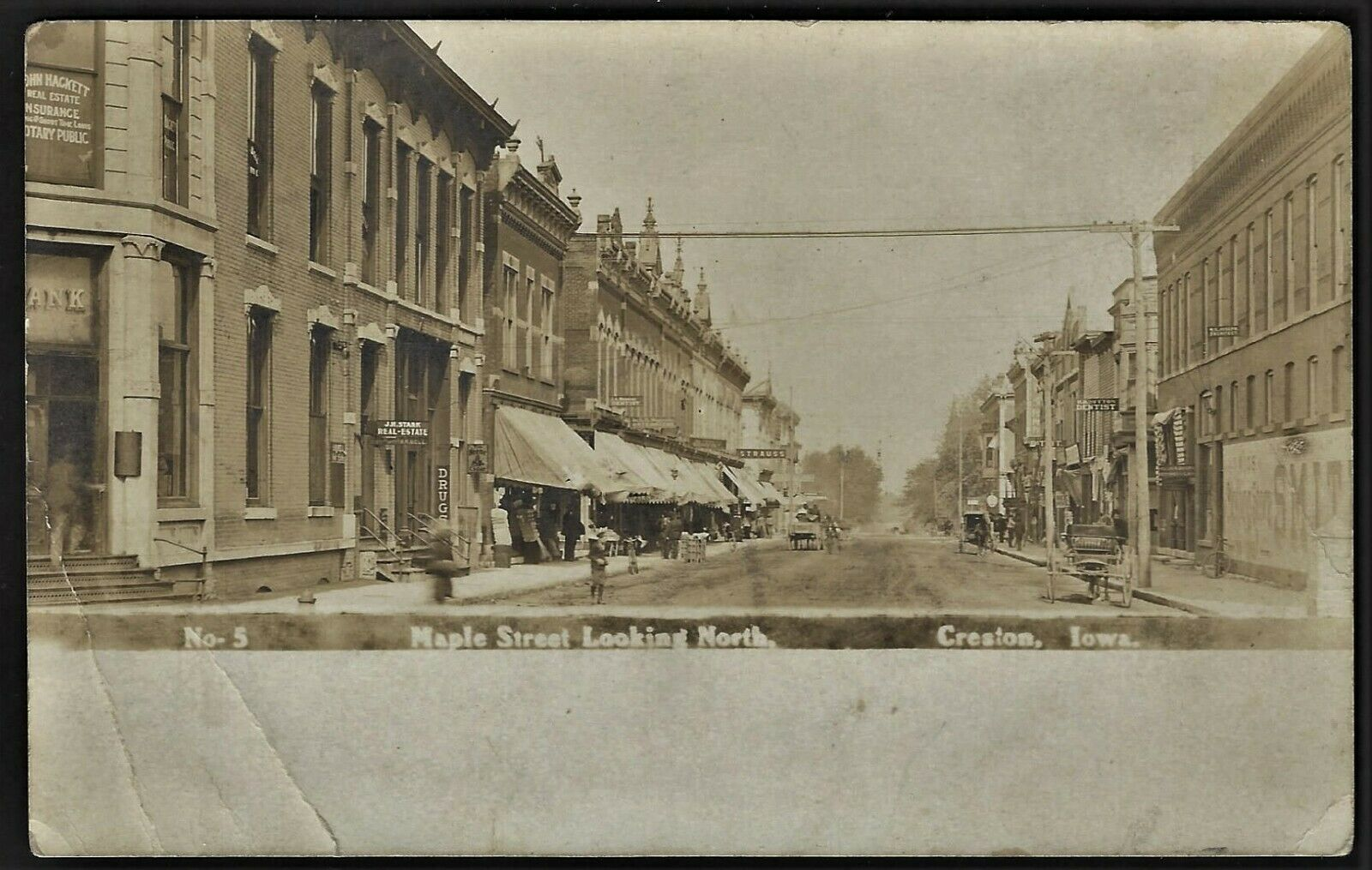
Creston, 1908

Creston was originally settled in 1868 as a survey camp for the Burlington and Missouri Railroad. It was named for the fact that it was on the crest of the railroad line between the Missouri and Mississippi river basins. The area was developed largely for agriculture, with related industries accompanying it. Creston had a flour mill in the early decades of the 20th century. The town was officially established in 1869 and incorporated in 1871.

Creston was chosen as the division point for the railroad, who built machine shops, a roundhouse, and a construction camp in the new town. Railroad employees, including African Americans, were recruited from Chicago and other major cities to work in Creston. The Chicago, Burlington and Quincy Railroad (CB&Q) opened a new station in Creston in 1899. The three-story, yellow brick Creston station is in the French Provincial style, with a red-tiled mansard roof.

Creston's economy and population were affected during the mid-20th century by a reduction in passenger train service and decline in railroad employment. The old machine shop building was destroyed by a tornado in 1946 and the remainder of the roundhouse burned down in 1981. The CB&Q station served passengers for 69 years before being renovated in 1978 to serve as city hall.

The railroad, now BNSF Railway, continues to be a major hauler of grain and coal in the region and uses Creston as a crew change point: Creston-based crews operate trains between Creston and Lincoln, Nebraska, while crews from Galesburg, Illinois and Lincoln stay in Creston before returning home.

Creston is served by Amtrak's daily Chicago–San Francisco Bay Area California Zephyr. Amtrak has used Creston's historic CB&Q station since 2019.

=== 2012 tornado ===
Creston was hit by a strong EF2 tornado on April 14, 2012. The tornado caused considerable damage to the hospital, community college, Kingdom Hall of Jehovah's Witnesses, and the high school. The town's tornado sirens did not sound, catching people off guard. Patients at the hospital were transferred to other local hospitals. The college suffered roof and window damage to its dorms and students were transferred to local hotels for the rest of the school semester. Fourteen people suffered minor injuries; there were no deaths. The Greater Regional Medical Center was two weeks from an open house to unveil a major renovation when it was severely damaged by the tornado. One year after the tornado and $10 million in renovations later, the hospital was fully restored.

== Geography ==
Creston is located on U.S. Route 34 in southwest Iowa, approximately 55 miles (90 km) southwest of Des Moines and 80 miles (130 km) east of Omaha, Nebraska. According to the United States Census Bureau, the city has a total area of 5.25 square miles (13.60 km^{2}), of which 5.19 square miles (13.44 km^{2}) is land and 0.06 square miles (0.16 km^{2}) is water.

McKinley Lake lies within a large, multi-purpose municipal park within the city limits, and three additional recreational lakes are located within seven miles of Creston: Green Valley State Park, Summit Lake, Twelve Mile Lake and Three Mile Recreation Area.

=== Climate ===
According to the Köppen Climate Classification system, Creston has a hot-summer humid continental climate, abbreviated "Dfa" on climate maps.

Climate data for Creston, Iowa, 1991–2020 normals, extremes 1905–present
Month	Jan	Feb	Mar	Apr	May	Jun	Jul	Aug	Sep	Oct	Nov	Dec	Year
Record high °F (°C)	66 (19)	78 (26)	87 (31)	93 (34)	103 (39)	102 (39)	111 (44)	111 (44)	103 (39)	92 (33)	80 (27)	71 (22)	111 (44)
Mean maximum °F (°C)	52.9 (11.6)	58.1 (14.5)	72.9 (22.7)	82.2 (27.9)	87.2 (30.7)	91.4 (33.0)	94.3 (34.6)	93.0 (33.9)	89.6 (32.0)	83.2 (28.4)	68.5 (20.3)	56.9 (13.8)	95.7 (35.4)
Mean daily maximum °F (°C)	30.5 (−0.8)	35.1 (1.7)	48.7 (9.3)	61.2 (16.2)	71.3 (21.8)	80.9 (27.2)	84.7 (29.3)	83.0 (28.3)	76.4 (24.7)	64.1 (17.8)	48.4 (9.1)	35.7 (2.1)	60.0 (15.6)
Daily mean °F (°C)	20.5 (−6.4)	24.5 (−4.2)	37.1 (2.8)	48.6 (9.2)	60.1 (15.6)	70.1 (21.2)	74.0 (23.3)	71.8 (22.1)	64.0 (17.8)	51.7 (10.9)	37.3 (2.9)	25.8 (−3.4)	48.8 (9.3)
Mean daily minimum °F (°C)	10.6 (−11.9)	13.8 (−10.1)	25.5 (−3.6)	36.1 (2.3)	48.8 (9.3)	59.4 (15.2)	63.2 (17.3)	60.7 (15.9)	51.6 (10.9)	39.3 (4.1)	26.2 (−3.2)	16.0 (−8.9)	37.6 (3.1)
Mean minimum °F (°C)	−9.8 (−23.2)	−4.6 (−20.3)	6.7 (−14.1)	22.0 (−5.6)	35.8 (2.1)	48.4 (9.1)	53.5 (11.9)	51.8 (11.0)	37.6 (3.1)	24.8 (−4.0)	10.1 (−12.2)	−2.8 (−19.3)	−13.7 (−25.4)
Record low °F (°C)	−31 (−35)	−26 (−32)	−20 (−29)	7 (−14)	23 (−5)	37 (3)	39 (4)	39 (4)	24 (−4)	2 (−17)	−18 (−28)	−26 (−32)	−31 (−35)
Average precipitation inches (mm)	1.04 (26)	1.46 (37)	2.53 (64)	3.74 (95)	5.15 (131)	5.17 (131)	4.46 (113)	4.23 (107)	3.70 (94)	2.79 (71)	2.14 (54)	1.48 (38)	37.89 (961)
Average snowfall inches (cm)	6.1 (15)	9.1 (23)	3.5 (8.9)	0.8 (2.0)	0.0 (0.0)	0.0 (0.0)	0.0 (0.0)	0.0 (0.0)	0.0 (0.0)	0.1 (0.25)	1.8 (4.6)	5.6 (14)	27.0 (69)
Average precipitation days (≥ 0.01 in)	4.1	5.0	8.1	10.6	12.3	11.3	9.1	8.9	8.1	8.0	6.3	5.2	97.0
Average snowy days (≥ 0.1 in)	3.6	3.9	1.6	0.4	0.0	0.0	0.0	0.0	0.0	0.2	1.1	3.4	14.2
Source 1: NOAA (precip days, snow/snow days 1981–2010)
Source 2: National Weather Service

== Demographics ==
Historical populations
Year	Pop.	±%
1870	411	—
1880	5,081	+1136.3%
1890	7,200	+41.7%
1900	7,752	+7.7%
1910	6,924	−10.7%
1920	8,034	+16.0%
1930	8,615	+7.2%
1940	8,033	−6.8%
1950	8,317	+3.5%
1960	7,667	−7.8%
1970	8,234	+7.4%
1980	8,429	+2.4%
1990	7,911	−6.1%
2000	7,597	−4.0%
2010	7,834	+3.1%
2020	7,536	−3.8%
Source:"U.S. Census website". United States Census Bureau. and Iowa Data Center; Source: U.S. Decennial Census

=== 2020 census ===
As of the 2020 census, there were 7,536 people, 3,301 households, and 1,831 families residing in the city. The population density was 1,452.4 inhabitants per square mile (560.8/km^{2}). There were 3,683 housing units at an average density of 709.8 per square mile (274.1/km^{2}).

Of the 3,301 households, 25.1% had children under the age of 18 living with them. 37.7% were married-couple households, 8.0% were cohabitating-couple households, 31.1% had a female householder with no spouse or partner present, and 23.1% had a male householder with no spouse or partner present. 44.5% of all households were non-families. 37.9% of all households were made up of individuals, and 17.3% had someone living alone who was 65 years of age or older.

There were 3,683 housing units, of which 10.4% were vacant. The homeowner vacancy rate was 2.5% and the rental vacancy rate was 9.7%. 99.6% of residents lived in urban areas, while 0.4% lived in rural areas.

The median age in the city was 39.3 years. 21.9% of residents were under the age of 18. 25.8% of residents were under the age of 20; 6.2% were between the ages of 20 and 24; 24.2% were from 25 to 44; 23.1% were from 45 to 64; and 20.7% were 65 years of age or older. The gender makeup of the city was 48.5% male and 51.5% female. For every 100 females there were 94.2 males, and for every 100 females age 18 and over there were 91.6 males age 18 and over.

Racial composition as of the 2020 census
Race	Number	Percent
White	6,919	91.8%
Black or African American	112	1.5%
American Indian and Alaska Native	32	0.4%
Asian	43	0.6%
Native Hawaiian and Other Pacific Islander	7	0.1%
Some other race	93	1.2%
Two or more races	330	4.4%
Hispanic or Latino (of any race)	306	4.1%

=== 2010 census ===
As of the census of 2010, there were 7,834 people, 3,378 households, and 1,973 families living in the city. The population density was 1,509.4 inhabitants per square mile (582.8/km^{2}). There were 3,773 housing units at an average density of 727.0 per square mile (280.7/km^{2}). The racial makeup of the city was 96.0% White, 1.0% African American, 0.3% Native American, 0.6% Asian, 0.8% from other races, and 1.2% from two or more races. Hispanic or Latino of any race were 2.3% of the population.

There were 3,378 households, of which 28.1% had children under the age of 18 living with them, 42.5% were married couples living together, 11.5% had a female householder with no husband present, 4.4% had a male householder with no wife present, and 41.6% were non-families. 35.7% of all households were made up of individuals, and 15.3% had someone living alone who was 65 years of age or older. The average household size was 2.23 and the average family size was 2.87.

The median age in the city was 38.8 years. 23.1% of residents were under the age of 18; 10.5% were between the ages of 18 and 24; 22.9% were from 25 to 44; 25.5% were from 45 to 64; and 17.9% were 65 years of age or older. The gender makeup of the city was 47.7% male and 52.3% female.

=== 2000 census ===
As of the census of 2000, there were 7,597 people, 3,346 households, and 1,974 families living in the city. The population density was 1,496.2 inhabitants per square mile (577.7/km^{2}). There were 3,598 housing units at an average density of 708.6 per square mile (273.6/km^{2}). The racial makeup of the city was 98.13% White, 0.34% African American, 0.22% Native American, 0.34% Asian, 0.38% from other races, and 0.58% from two or more races. Hispanic or Latino of any race were 1.26% of the population.

There were 3,346 households, out of which 26.4% had children under the age of 18 living with them, 46.5% were married couples living together, 9.9% had a female householder with no husband present, and 41.0% were non-families. 35.7% of all households were made up of individuals, and 16.0% had someone living alone who was 65 years of age or older. The average household size was 2.20 and the average family size was 2.86.

Age spread: 22.6% under the age of 18, 10.4% from 18 to 24, 25.0% from 25 to 44, 22.0% from 45 to 64, and 20.0% who were 65 years of age or older. The median age was 39 years. For every 100 females, there were 86.7 males. For every 100 females age 18 and over, there were 83.3 males.

The median income for a household in the city was $29,831, and the median income for a family was $41,003. Males had a median income of $27,580 versus $20,172 for females. The per capita income for the city was $16,411. About 7.0% of families and 11.5% of the population were below the poverty line, including 13.6% of those under age 18 and 8.3% of those age 65 or over.

== Education ==
Creston is served by the Creston Community School District:

- Creston High School
- Creston Middle School
- Creston Elementary School

Private Schools in Creston include:

- St. Malachy School (K-8) of the Roman Catholic Diocese of Des Moines
- Mayflower Heritage Christian Academy (K-8)

=== Colleges ===
- Southwestern Community College
- Buena Vista University – Creston Campus

== Notable people ==
- Harry Archer, Broadway musical composer and bandleader
- William Bell, tubist
- Don Corbitt (1924–1993), American football player
- Julee Cruise, actor and singer
- Walter Cunningham (1932–2023) fighter pilot, physicist, and astronaut
- Sherry Edmundson Fry, co-founder of the United States Army Camouflage Corps
- Dick Wick Hall, writer and humorist
- Jerry Harrington, Major League Baseball player
- Bob Hawk, radio personality
- Jerome C. Hunsaker (1886–1984), Aviation designer of flying boats and airships
- James M. McCoy, 6th Chief Master Sergeant of the United States Air Force.
- Edward E. Miller, US representative from the state of Illinois
- Frosty Peters, American football player
- Frank Phillips, founder of the Phillips Petroleum Company
- John Robinson (born 1954), one of the most recorded drummers in history
- Ray Sorensen, member state representative of the Iowa House of Representatives
- Phyllis Thede (born 1954), served as an Iowa state representative in Des Moines
- Marcia Wallace (1942–2013), TV actress/comedian on long-running "The Bob Newhart Show"
- Kiersten Warren, actress
