= Omaha station (Chicago, Burlington and Quincy Railroad) =

Landmark and TV studio

Omaha
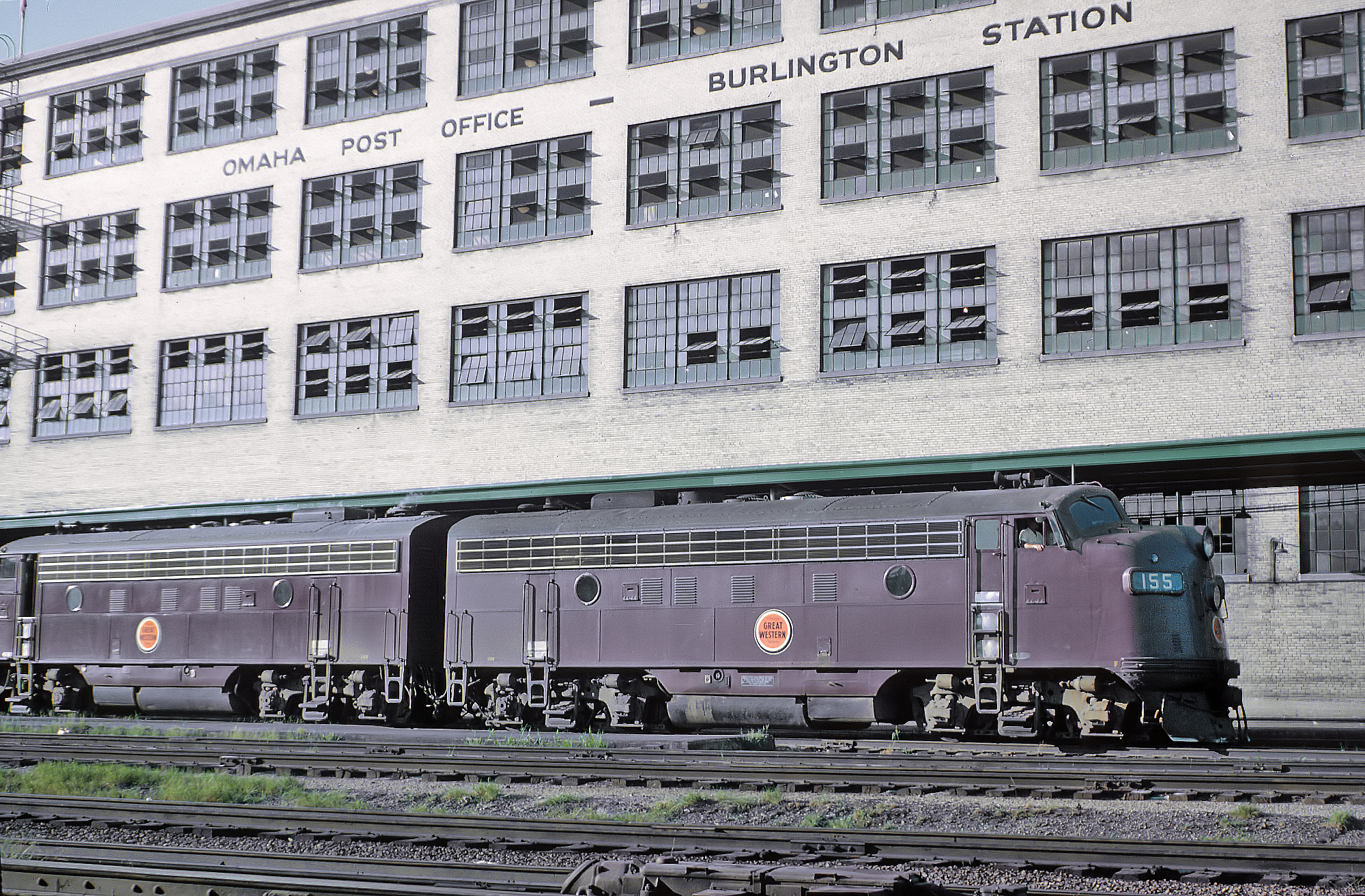
- The Chicago and Great Western's Nebraska Limited pulling into the station on August 8, 1962

General information
- Location: 1001 South 10th Street, Omaha, Nebraska 68108
- System: Former Burlington Route passenger station

History
- Opened: 1871
- Closed: 1974

Services
Preceding station	Burlington Route	Following station
South Omaha toward Denver	Main Line	Council Bluffs Transfer toward Chicago
Lincoln toward Oakland	California Zephyr	Creston toward Chicago
Terminus	Omaha – Kansas City	Council Bluffs Transfer toward Kansas City
Preceding station	Chicago Great Western Railway	Following station
Terminus	Omaha – Chicago	Council Bluffs toward Chicago
- The Burlington Station
- U.S. National Register of Historic Places
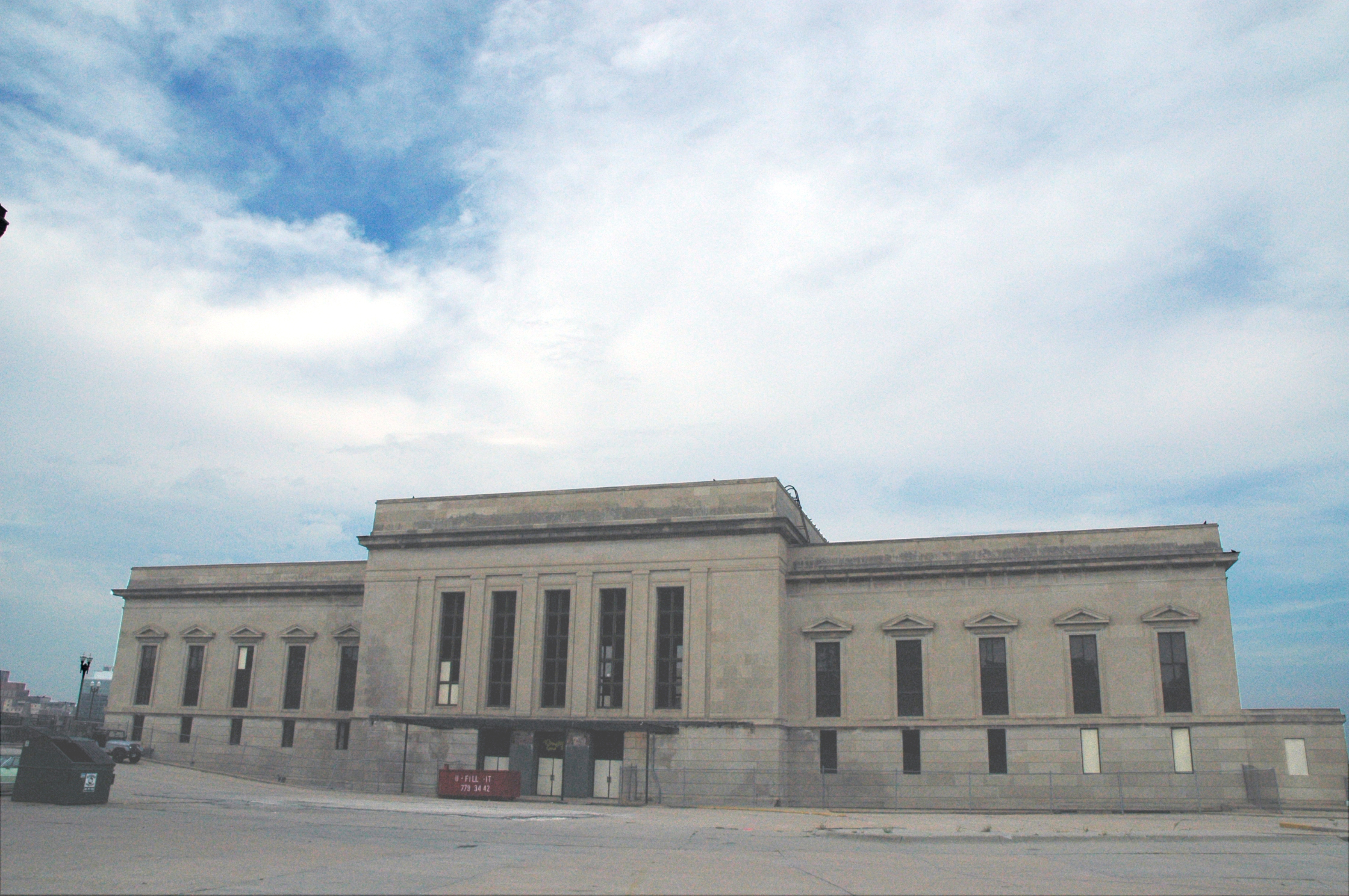
- Entrance to Burlington Station in 2005, pre-dating KETV renovations.

- Location within Nebraska Location within the United States
- Location: Omaha, Nebraska
- Coordinates: 41°14′59.32″N 95°55′41.76″W
- Built: 1898
- Architect: Thomas Rogers Kimball; Graham, Anderson, Probst & White
- Architectural style: Classical Revival
- NRHP reference No.: 74001110
- Added to NRHP: August 7, 1974
Location

Omaha station, also known as the Burlington Station, is a former station of the Chicago, Burlington and Quincy Railroad in Omaha, Nebraska. Designed by Thomas Rogers Kimball in Italianate style, it opened in 1898 and operated until 1974; it is currently used as the studio facility for Omaha's ABC affiliate, television station KETV (channel 7). The building is listed on the National Register of Historic Places and is a contributing property to the Omaha Rail and Commerce Historic District. It is located at 1001 South 10th Street in downtown Omaha, southeast of the Old Market and immediately north of Little Italy.

== History ==
=== Beginning ===
The Chicago, Burlington and Quincy Railroad, serving the Midwest since its founding in 1850, first entered downtown Omaha in 1870. In addition to transporting Nebraska's farm produce to other areas of the country, the Burlington Railroad also handled mail through the area from 1884 to 1972.

The railroad was influential in the growth of Omaha and Nebraska, and the Omaha Burlington Station served the needs of both passengers and freight longer than any depot in Omaha history. A temporary building was first erected on the present site in 1890 in anticipation of the construction of a new and grander edifice to be completed by the Union Depot Company, a partnership between the Union Pacific and Burlington Railroads. Later that year, construction was halted due to Union Pacific's financial difficulties, and in 1897 the Burlington announced plans to build a new station. Famed Omaha architect Thomas Rogers Kimball designed the building.

=== 1898-1928 ===
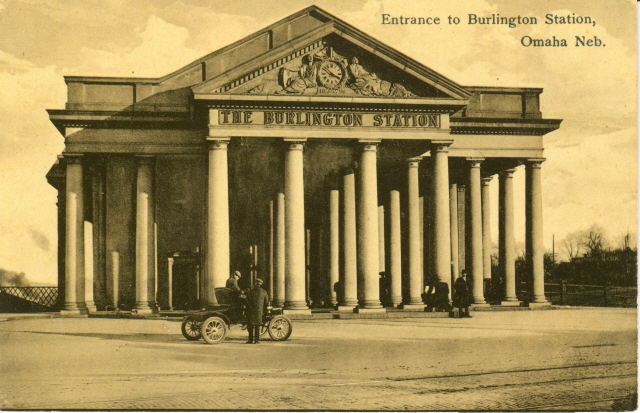
Former front entrance of the station from a 1910 postcard.

This new Burlington station opened on July 4, 1898, in time for the Trans-Mississippi International Exposition, a glittering inter-national showcase that attracted visitors to Omaha from around the world. The main lobby featured a grand circular staircase that led passengers downstairs to track level and the trains. A large canopy, a first for an Omaha train station, covered two tracks and kept passengers from the elements. The spacious lobby included new amenities, such as separate men's and women's waiting rooms, a gentleman's smoking room, and a sit-down lunch counter. The interior featured Sienna marble columns, and mosaic floors with the staircase accented with bronze castings of Rocky Mountain Sheep heads. The total cost of the station was $408,000.00, a very impressive amount for the day.

The building attracted considerable attention for its pristine beauty. The accolades were universal. A German commission judged the station to be America's finest railroad station, and in 1908, the Chicago Record wrote, 'The handsomest railway station ever seen is the Burlington Station at Omaha. It is an artistic gem and looks like a Grecian Temple.'

Although great attention was lavished on the classic proportions and styling of the station, functional considerations were also important to the design. Since the two-story depot was built next to the 10th Street viaduct, the main entrance to the station was from the viaduct to the second floor. This portico featured twenty-eight massive Colorado granite columns. The walls of the depot were built of light gray brick and buff Indiana limestone; the roof was covered in glazed red Ludowici tile. The Seattle Post-Intelligencer, in discussing the Omaha station in 1889 said, 'Through an inspiration worthy of general imitation, it (The Burlington Railroad) has erected at Omaha a most imposing, most original, and most architectural of passenger stations.'

=== 1929-1953 ===
The station was extensively remodeled from 1929 to 1930 to compete with a new Union Station (now the Durham Museum), that was to open in 1931. The remodeling was completed on September 4, 1930, and a grand public ceremony was held. Among the changes celebrated that day was a new restaurant that was to stay open for the next thirty years.

The remodeling in 1930 changed the building to conform to the elements of the Neo-Classical Revival, which simplified the exterior, removing the granite columns, and much of the external detail. Twenty-four of the original columns were moved intact to Lincoln, where today they stand between Memorial Stadium and the Coliseum. The remodeling also included raising the roof-line over the main waiting room. The walls were decorated in a new motif including a border of gold medallions. Four large lanterns were installed, each weighing more than a ton. The central spiral staircase was totally removed

=== 1954-2013 ===
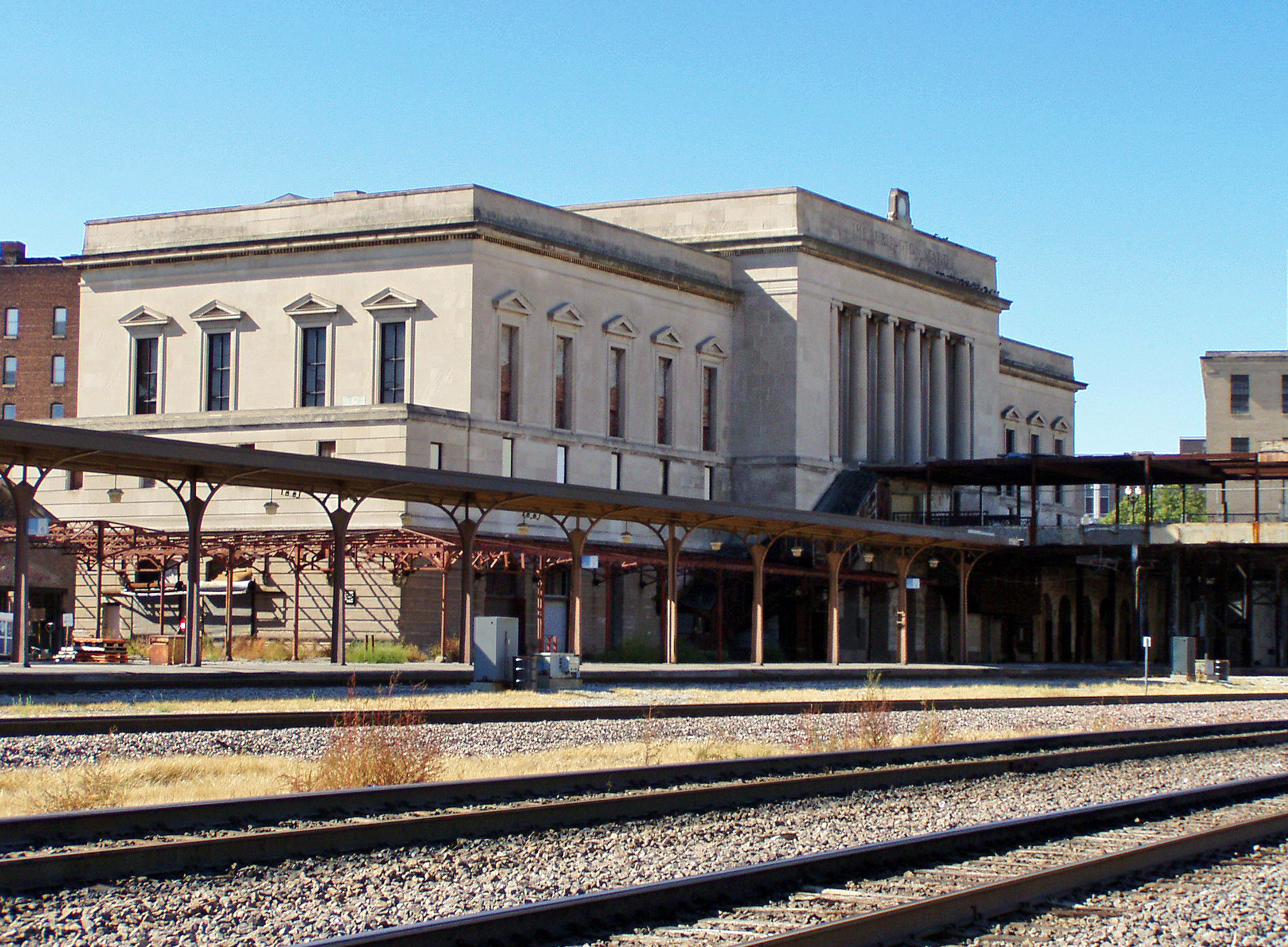
The north face of Omaha's Burlington Station

Remodeled again in 1954, the station saw a major parking plaza erected with lights and canopy, and a circular drive that enabled people to drop passengers at the station. During the late 1960s train travel was greatly reduced and several areas of the station fell into disrepair. Finally, in 1971, passenger service was turned over to Amtrak, which operated the Burlington Station until February 1, 1974, moving to a more spartan station about 220 feet (67 m) directly to the east in 1983 after a period of time with a temporary station. Also in 1974 the station was listed on the National Register of Historic Places as The Burlington Station.

Since its closing, the station saw futile attempts at reopening as business offices, and as a warehouse. In 1985, the interior was gutted by an architectural salvager who removed and sold every interior fitting. The four enormous chandeliers were taken down, one of which was broken and was sold in pieces. In 2004, two investors purchased the building. Renovations were planned to transform the building through adaptive re-use into private residences called "The Burlington". When the economy fell and a real estate crisis began in 2008, low pre-sales of condos stopped the project and since then the building continued to languish with an uncertain future.

=== KETV studio (2013-present) ===
On 5 June 2013, Hearst Television announced the purchase of Burlington Station to remodel it as the broadcast facility for Omaha's ABC affiliate, KETV (channel 7), providing the station a state-of-the-art broadcast and web media facility. The building was renovated over two years, with the station moving from their current building at 27th and Douglas in late October 2015. The building's renovation was designed by Leo A Daly Company. KETV aired their first broadcast from 7 Burlington Station at 5PM on Wednesday, October 28, 2015.

== See also ==
- Omaha Amtrak Station
- Omaha Union Station
- Richard Bock - Sculptor who designed pediments at the Station.
- Burlington Headquarters Building - Located several blocks from the station.
