= Historic Railroad District =

Historic district in Iowa, United States

- U.S. National Register of Historic Places
- U.S. Historic district
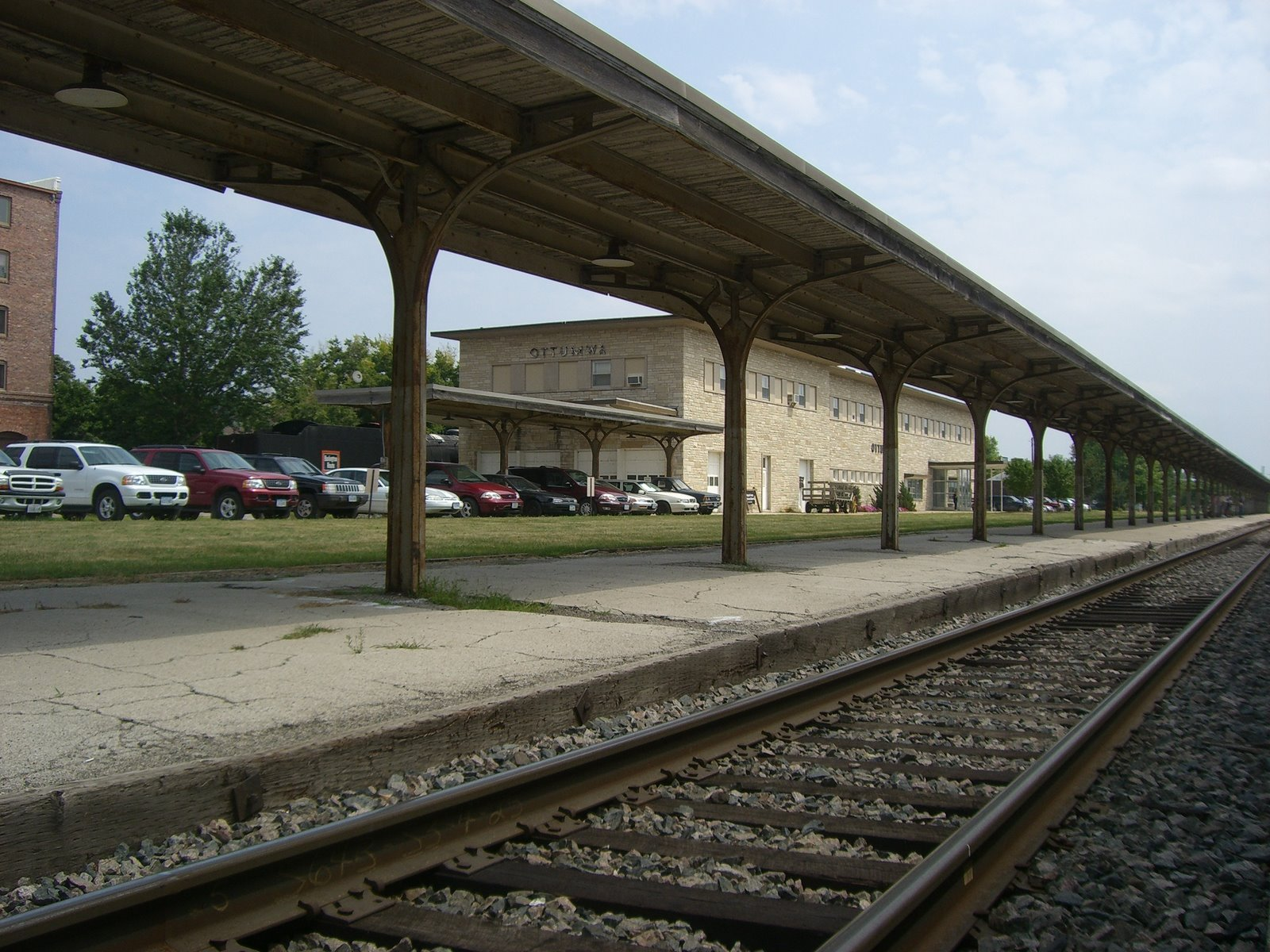
- The Burlington Northern/Santa Fe passenger canopies

- Location within Iowa Location within the United States
- Location: 1200 block of N. Fellows St. and 1204-1212 N. Elm St. Ottumwa, Iowa
- Coordinates: 41°1′37″N 92°23′49″W
- MPS: Post-World War II Development in Ottumwa, Ia 1944-1959 MPS
- NRHP reference No.: 11000723
- Added to NRHP: October 6, 2011

The Historic Railroad District is located in Ottumwa, Iowa, United States. The historic district includes four separate properties: the Burlington Veterans Clubhouse (1935), the Burlington Depot (1951), the Burlington Northern/Santa Fe passenger canopies (1951) and Ballingall Park (1951). It was listed on the National Register of Historic Places in 2011.
