= Oskaloosa station =

- Rock Island Passenger Depot
- U.S. National Register of Historic Places
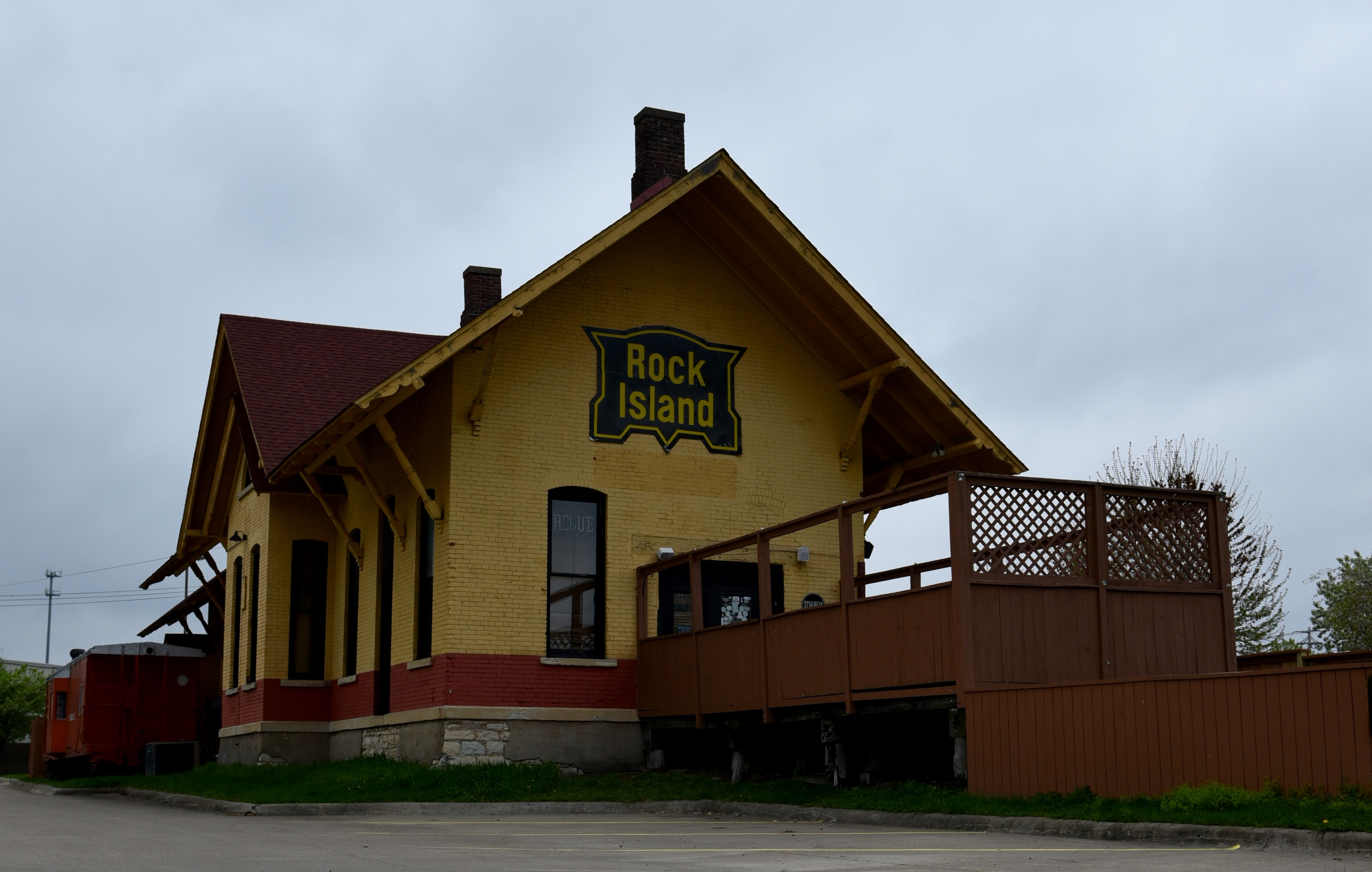

- Location within Iowa Location within the United States
- Location: Rock Island Ave. between 1st and 2nd Sts. Oskaloosa, Iowa
- Coordinates: 41°17′21″N 92°38′36″W
- Area: less than one acre
- Built: 1887-1888
- Architectural style: Stick/Eastlake
- NRHP reference No.: 89001780
- Added to NRHP: October 30, 1989

The Rock Island Passenger Depot is a historic building located in Oskaloosa, Iowa, United States. The Chicago, Rock Island & Pacific Railroad arrived in town in 1876, and they built a frame combination depot on the north side of the tracks. This depot replaced the original one in 1888 on the south side of the tracks, and it served ten passenger trains a day. A separate freight depot was built to the east. President Theodore Roosevelt stopped here when he came to dedicate the new Y.M.C.A. in 1903. The freight and passenger depots were combined into a single facility once again in 1930, utilizing the passenger depot. The depot was officially abandoned in 1973. It was listed on the National Register of Historic Places in 1989. The building now houses a pub.

The depot is a single-story brick structure in the Stick-Eastlake style. When used as a depot it had a men's waiting room on the west side and woman's room on the east. The ticket agent and a lunch counter separated them. There was also a room for baggage and restrooms facilities. It is not known who designed the building.

Preceding station	Chicago, Rock Island and Pacific Railroad	Following station
Evans toward Des Moines	Des Moines – Washington	Rose Hill toward Washington
Terminus	Oskaloosa – Keokuk	Beacon toward Keokuk
