= Burlington station (Iowa) =

Train station in Iowa

Burlington, IA
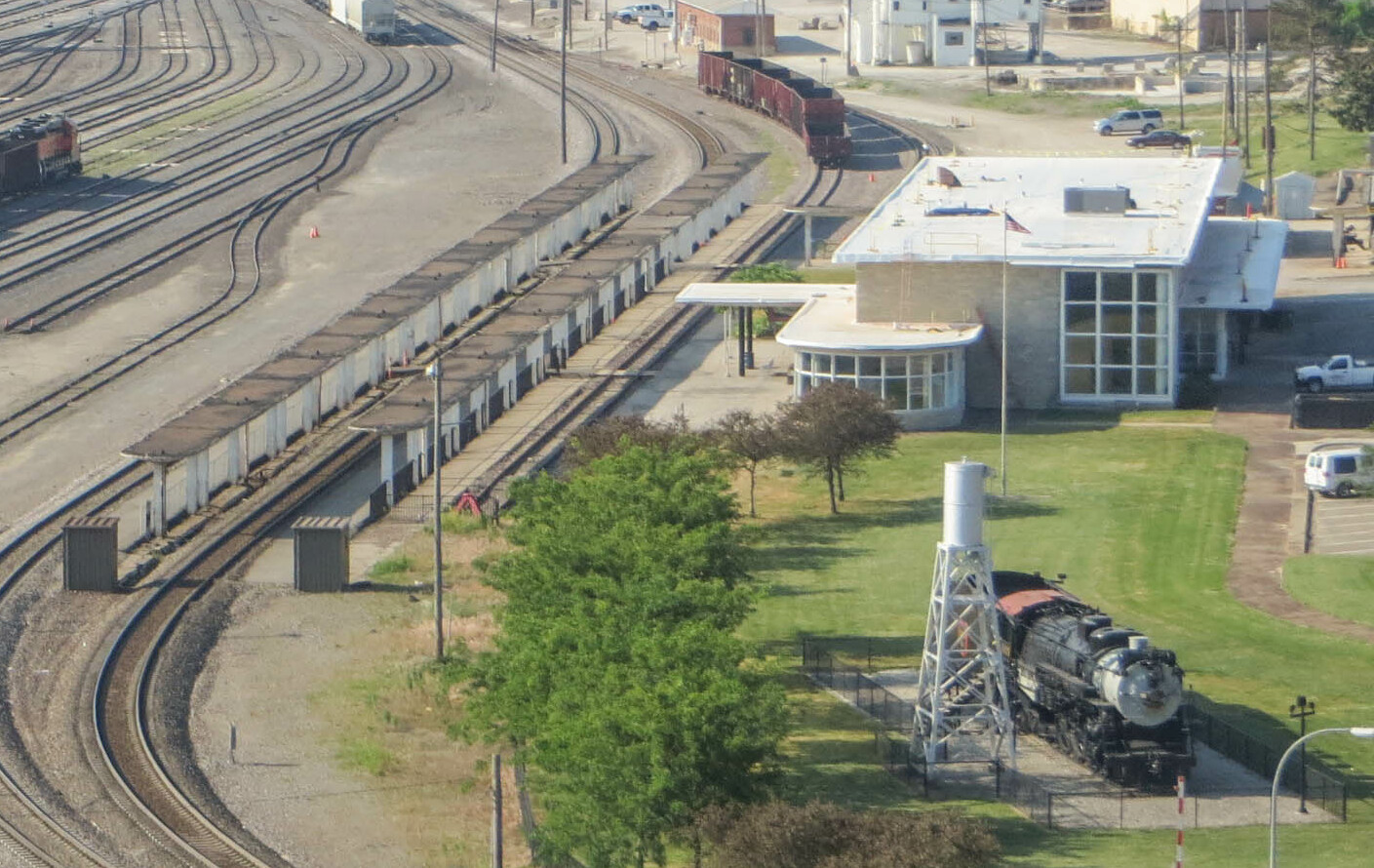
- Burlington station in June 2016

General information
- Location: 300 South Main Street; Burlington, Iowa; United States
- Owner: City of Burlington (station); BNSF Railway (platform and tracks)
- Line: BNSF Ottumwa Subdivision
- Platforms: 1 side platform, 1 island platform
- Tracks: 3
- Connections: Burlington Urban Service

Other information
- Station code: Amtrak: BRL

History
- Rebuilt: March 28, 1944

Passengers
- FY 2025: 6,845 (Amtrak)

Services
Preceding station	Amtrak	Following station
Mount Pleasant toward Emeryville	California Zephyr	Galesburg toward Chicago
Former services
Preceding station	Amtrak	Following station
Mount Pleasant toward Los Angeles	Desert Wind Discontinued in 1997	Galesburg toward Chicago
Mount Pleasant toward Seattle	Pioneer Discontinued in 1997	Galesburg toward Chicago
Mount Pleasant toward Oakland-16th Street	San Francisco Zephyr	Monmouth toward Chicago
Preceding station	Burlington Route	Following station
West Burlington toward Denver	Main Line	Gladstone toward Chicago
Mount Pleasant toward Oakland	California Zephyr	Galesburg toward Chicago
Terminus	Burlington – Quincy	Carman toward Quincy
Terminus	Burlington – St. Louis	Wever toward St. Louis
Preceding station	Chicago, Rock Island and Pacific Railroad	Following station
Sperry toward Minneapolis	Burlington, Cedar Rapids and Northern Railway	Terminus
- Chicago, Burlington and Quincy Station
- U.S. National Register of Historic Places
- Interactive map of Chicago, Burlington and Quincy Station
- Coordinates: 40°48′20″N 91°6′6″W
- Area: 2.9 acres (1.2 ha)
- Built: 1944
- Architect: Holibard & Root
- Architectural style: Moderne
- NRHP reference No.: 01001540
- Added to NRHP: February 4, 2002
Location

Burlington station is an Amtrak train station in Burlington, Iowa, United States. It is served by the California Zephyr, with one daily train in each direction. The station was built by the Chicago, Burlington and Quincy Railroad (CB&Q) in 1944, replacing the previous union station used by the CB&Q and the Chicago, Rock Island and Pacific Railroad. That station burned in January 1943.

Burlington station is served by the local transit operator, Burlington Urban Service. Via the local buses, connections are also possible at the West Burlington intercity bus stop, from which Burlington Trailways operates.
